= Solihull =

Town in West Midlands, England

Coordinates: 52.413°N 1.778°W

- Town
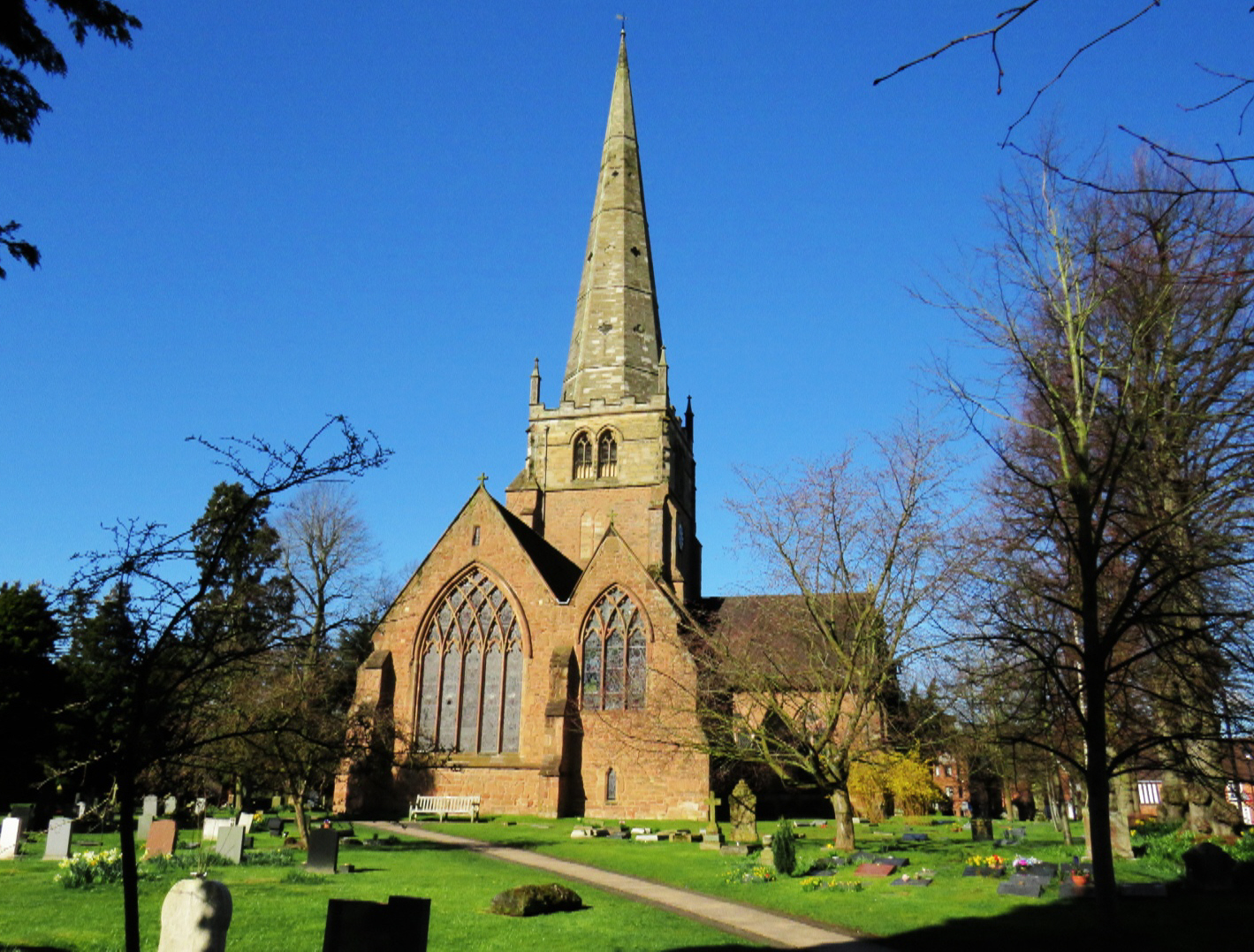
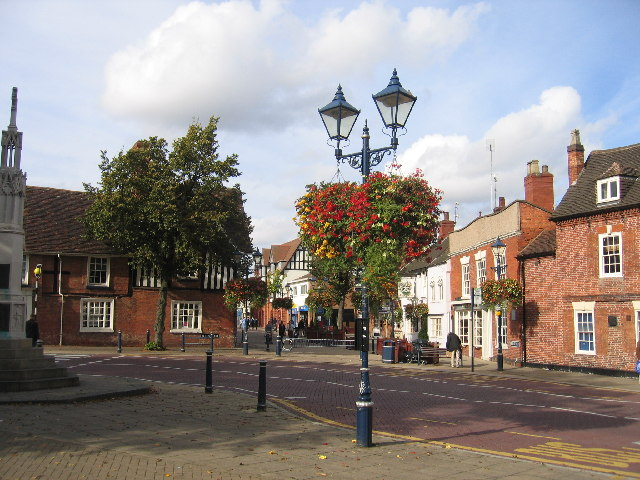
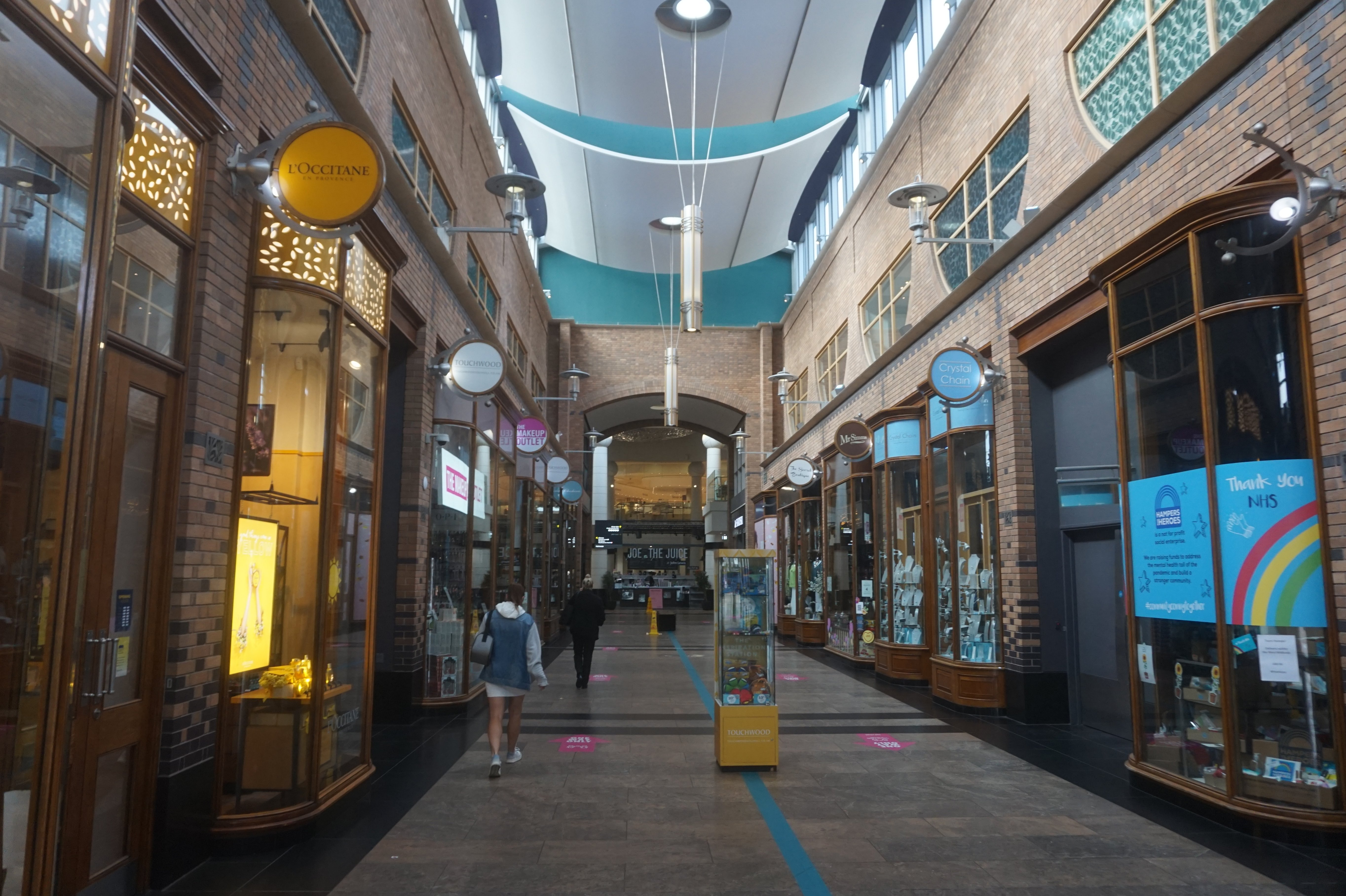
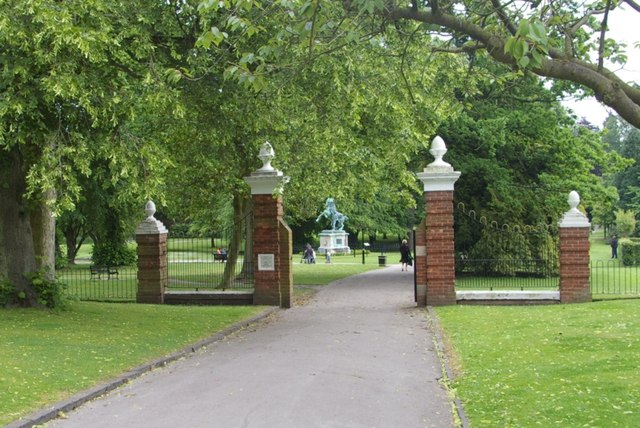
- St Alphege Church The Square Touchwood Centre Malvern Park

- Location within the West Midlands
- Population: 126,577 (2021 census)
- Demonym: Silhillian
- OS grid reference: SP1579
  - London: 110 mi (180 km) SE
- Metropolitan borough: Solihull
- Metropolitan county: West Midlands
- Region: West Midlands
- Country: England
- Sovereign state: United Kingdom
- Post town: Solihull
- Postcode district: B91, B92
- Dialling code: 0121
- Police: West Midlands
- Fire: West Midlands
- Ambulance: West Midlands
- UK Parliament: Solihull West and Shirley, Meriden and Solihull East
- Website: https://www.solihull.gov.uk/

Solihull (/ˈsɒlihʌl, ˈsoʊl-, ˌsoʊliˈhʌl/ SO(H)L-ee-hul, SOH-lee-HUL) is a market town in the Metropolitan Borough of Solihull in the West Midlands county, England. Solihull is situated on the River Blythe in the Forest of Arden area. The town had a population of 126,577 at the 2021 census, and the wider metropolitan borough had a population of 216,240. The town is located around 8 miles (13 km) southeast of Birmingham and 14 miles (23 km) west of Coventry.

Solihull itself is mostly urban; however, the larger borough is rural in character, with many outlying villages, and three quarters of the borough designated as green belt. The town and its borough was part of Warwickshire for most of its history. It has roots dating back to the 1st century BC, and was further formally established during the medieval era. Today the town is famed as, amongst other things, the birthplace of the Land Rover car marque (whose cars are still manufactured at the Solihull plant), home of Solihull Moors and the training facilities for the British Equestrian teams. It became part of the West Midlands metropolitan county in 1974.

== Toponym ==
Solihull's name is commonly thought to have derived from the position of its arden stone parish church, St Alphege, on a 'soily' hill. The church was built on a hill of stiff red marl, which turned to sticky mud in wet weather.

== History ==
=== Early history ===
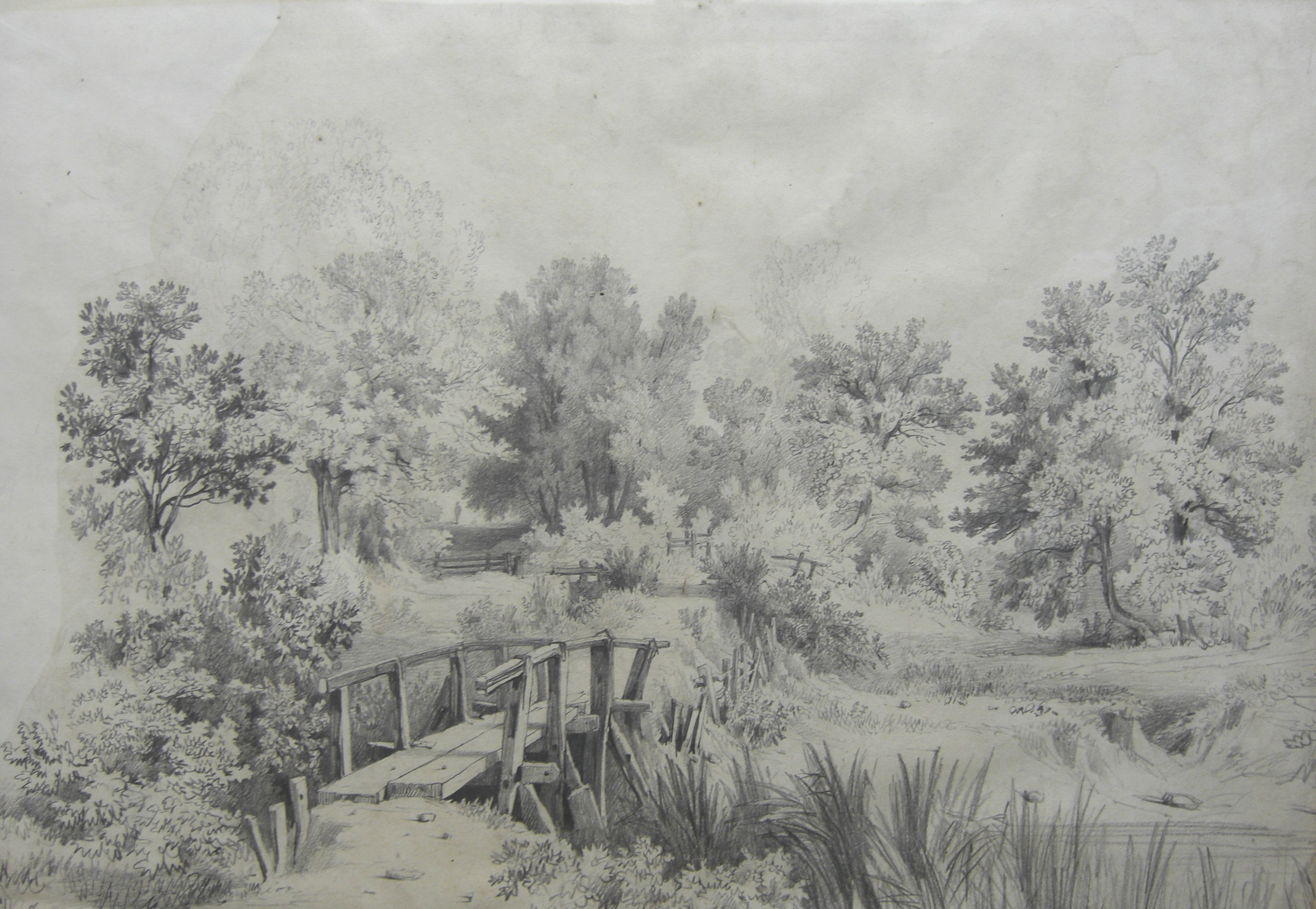
Wooden bridge over the Cole at Shirley, drawn in the 19th century by Samuel Rostill Lines

The land now forming Solihull was once covered in the ancient Forest of Arden.

The earliest known settlement in the area was at Berry Mound, Shirley, which was the site of an Iron Age Hill Fort, a fortified village protected by earth banks, dating back to the 1st century BC and which covered approximately 11 acres (4.5 ha). The name Shirley means either 'a bright clearing' or 'a border clearing' in the Forest of Arden.

During the later Iron Age the River Cole, which feeds the River Blythe, is believed to have been the border between the Corieltauvi and the Cornovii, with Solihull forming the junction of the two powerful Celtic Tribes.

Throughout the Roman occupation of Britain it was held that no Roman roads made it through the Forest of Arden because it was so dense. The nearest known major Roman settlements being at Grimstock Hill on the Solihull border, Metchley Fort (around 8.5 miles north west), and Alcester (around 15 miles south).

=== Anglo Saxon era ===
By the Anglo Saxon era, the forest of Arden was part of the Kingdom of Mercia. An assart settlement known as the manor of Ulverlei, meaning 'Wulfhere's clearing' was established, with its centre north east of the hillfort at Shirley. Wulfhere was the first Christian King of all Mercia. The settlement was a clearing in the dense woodland of the Forest of Arden, with the land farmed in common. The older settlement at Shirley was considered part of the new Manor of Ulverlei. This status as a clearing in the countryside is still reflected to this day in the town motto, "Urbs in rure" or "town in the country".

Local folklore holds that as part of his campaigns against the Viking invasion in the mid 9th century Alfred the Great fought a battle against the Danes at Berry Mound, Shirley.

After the absorption of Mercia into the rest of England, Ulverlei became the property of the Earls of Mercia. The first of these was Leofric, husband of Lady Godiva, heroine of the Warwickshire legend. The manor of Ulverlei later passed to Leofric's grandson, Edwin, Earl of Mercia who held it until his death in 1071. Leofric's great-nephew, Thorkell of Arden, would become progenitor of the locally prominent Arden family, one of the few Anglo Saxon families to retain their land holdings after the Norman Conquest, and eventually settling in their primary estate in Castle Bromwich, today in the Borough of Solihull.

=== Early medieval era ===
In 1086, it was recorded that the Manor of Ulverlei was now held by Cristina, great-granddaughter of Ethelred the Unready, daughter of Edward the Exile, and sister of the last Anglo Saxon King Edgar Aetheling. Shortly after 1086, Christina entered the nunnery of Romsey Abbey in Hampshire. Her lands were granted to the Norman Ralph de Limesy. The extent of the area historically considered the manor of Ulverlei is demarcated by an area called 'Worlds End', a historical naming practice indicating that people did not live beyond there.

It was between 1170 and 1180 that the de Limsey family founded the settlement of 'Solihull' as a "planted borough" or planned village to the south of Ulverli. It was called a borough simply because the de Limsey Lord of the Manor offered free burgage tenure where residents were free, rent-paying burgesses, rather than villeins owing service to the Lord of the Manor. By the time of Edward I, Ulverlie was sub-infeudated into the newly created Manor of Solihull, and became known as the 'Old Town', contracted to its present name, Olton to distinguish itself from the new town of Solihull.

The de Limsey family held the Manor of Solihull, until Ralph's great-granddaughter married Hugh de Odingsells, whose family were thought to be of Flemish origin.

The Odingsells were the Lords of the Manor of Ulverley, and later after its subinfeudation, Solihull, from the 12th century and are believed to have constructed a castle on the site now known as Hobs Moat (a possible corruption of Odingsells' Moat). The castle was occupied until around the 14th century. The Odingsells were relatives of the powerful Clinton Earls of Huntingdon of Maxstoke Castle (around 8 miles north east of Hobs Moat), whose relatives would also control nearby Coleshill Manor (around 6 miles north east of Hobs Moat), Kenilworth Castle (around 13 miles south east of Hobs Moat) and Baddesley Clinton (around 8 miles south of Hobs Moat).

The red sandstone parish church of St. Alphege dates from a similar period to Hobs Moat and is a large and handsome example of English Gothic church architecture, with a traditional spire 168 feet (51 metres) high, making it visible from a great distance. It is located at the head of High Street and is a grade I listed building. It was founded in about 1220 by Hugh de Oddingsell. A chantry chapel was also founded there by Sir William de Oddingsell in 1277 and the upper chapel in St Alphege was built for a chantry.

By 1242, the manor of Solihull was granted a royal charter to hold a weekly market and an annual fair "on the vigil, the feast and the morrow of St Alphege" (18-20 April). It was around this time that Solihull became a hub for its surrounding parishes.

The town of Solihull would later absorb the nearby settlement of Longdon. The first recorded reference to Longdon was in 1086 as 'Langedone', meaning the 'long hill'. The 'long hill' in question was the hill on what is now Solihull's Marsh Lane and Yew Tree Lane, leading from the River Blythe up onto Elmdon Heath. The Longdon Manor House was at its edge on Copt Heath. In 1161 the Manor of Longdon had been property of Ketelberne de Langdon, who founded Henwood Priory and gave his name to the settlement of Catherine-de-Barnes (a corruption of the name Ketelberne). The assimilation of Longdon into Solihull was so total that few references exist today indicating it was ever a separate place.

The Longdon area bordered onto the settlement of Hampton in Arden, appearing in the Domesday Survey of 1086 as 'Hantone'. Despite bordering Solihull, Hampton in Arden would not be incorporated into the borough of Solihull until later. From the middle of the 12th century Hampton in Arden was owned by the de Arden family, and also included the then hamlet of Knowle. Knowle would become a royal manor in 1285 when the de Arden family sold it to King Edward I and Queen Eleanor. In 1396, Walter Cook applied for a faculty to build a church in 'Knoll', so the villagers would no longer have to cross the treacherous waters of the river Blythe to get to church, and this was granted by Pope Boniface IX on 4 May 1396. By 1402 the church was consecrated and Knowle broke away from Hampton in Arden, later becoming part of the borough of Solihull.

Near Knowle lies the settlement of Temple Balsall, part of the borough of Solihull, that was founded by the Knights Templar, who farmed about 650 acres (2.6 km^{2}) of the estate in the 12th century, and established the church and the Balsall Preceptory.

=== Later medieval era ===
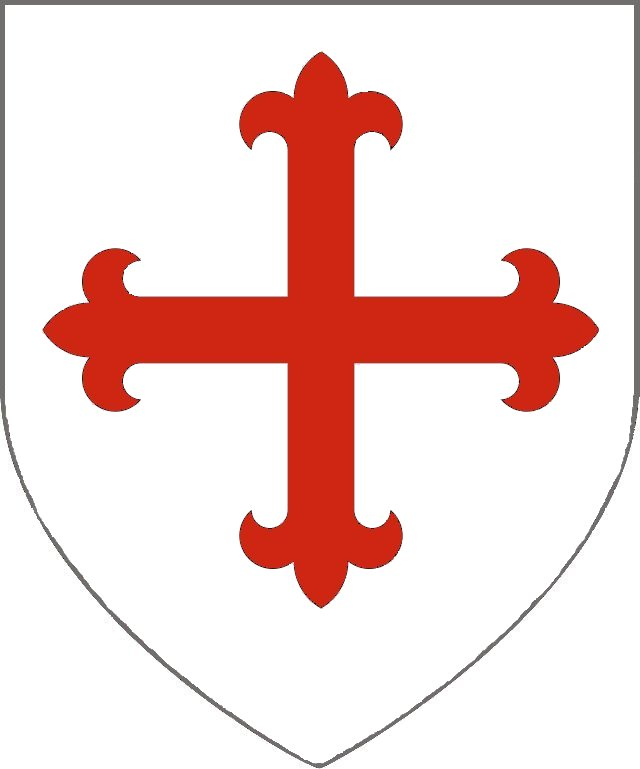
Rivals: The arms of Hugh Despenser, Chamberlain to the King and Lord of the Manor of Solihull (left) and William Trussell, King's Secretary of State and Lord of the Manor of Nuthurst (right).

By 1295, the manor of Solihull had passed from the Odingsells via heiress to the de Birmingham family, however they in turn quickly passed it into the Le Despencer family. The Despencers found themselves at odds with the Trussell family of nearby Nuthurst (now in the borough of Solihull) during the baronial revolt under Edward II. The warring between the two families ended when Sir William Trussell of Nuthurst led the invasion of England by Queen Isabella against Edward II, which installed Edward III on the throne. Hugh Despenser was executed and Sir William Trussell was made the King's Secretary of State for England under Edward III. The rivalry between the two families was intense, and at one point the grandson of Sir William Trussell, Sir John Trussell, abducted the widow of Hugh Despenser's grandson (also called Hugh Despenser), after he was killed in battle, and forced her to marry him in an ultimately futile attempt to take the manor of Solihull. The Despencers would briefly fall back into favour some years later when helping with the campaigns of Edward the Black Prince.

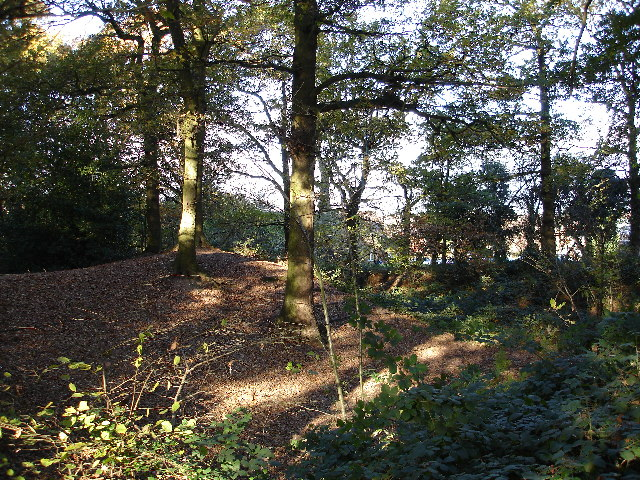
Hobs Moat Castle, Olton, Solihull

It is during this time in the 14th century that Hobs Moat Castle is believed to have fallen into ruin. Antiquary Sir William Dugdale would visit the site three centuries later in 1656, finding only "a large Moat" and was informed by the locals that the castle there had long since been removed. The Odingsells had built a new purpose-built manor house closer to the new town centre, called Silhill Hall, at some point in the 13th century. It is believed that through much of their ownership of the manor the Despencers would rent out Silhill Hall, or have their stewards reside there.

Within the Longdon area of Solihull, is an area known as Malvern, named for Simon de Malverne, believed to be of Malvern in Worcestershire, assassinated in 1317. A moated site opposite the end of Marsh Lane is believed to be the de Malvern former home.

By the 14th century, the town had become famed for its blacksmiths, and the Solihull High Street was known as le Smythestret. This was because of its location in the Forest of Arden, and the abundance of trees required to provide fuel for the fires. The town was also known for textiles. The end of Drury Lane was known as Teinters Green, believed to be an area where cloth was stretched on tenter hooks.

In the grounds of St Alphege church is a now grade II listed ruin dating from the 14th century. It is believed to have been a well house for a holy spring, and later possibly an oratory.

Historians have suggested that the Shakespeare family, ancestors of William Shakespeare (born a few miles south in Stratford-upon-Avon), were originally from Solihull's Balsall, with their names appearing in local registers between 1385 and 1457. Shakespeare's mother, Mary Arden, was from a cadet branch of the de Arden family of Castle Bromwich in the borough of Solihull. Shakespeare's son Hamnet Shakespeare's baptism on 23 March 1560 is recorded in the Register of Solihull.

In 1400, Thomas Despenser, 1st Earl of Gloucester died a traitor for his part in the Epiphany Rising, and so the Crown took custody of the manor because the heir, Richard le Despenser, was a minor.

=== Early modern era ===
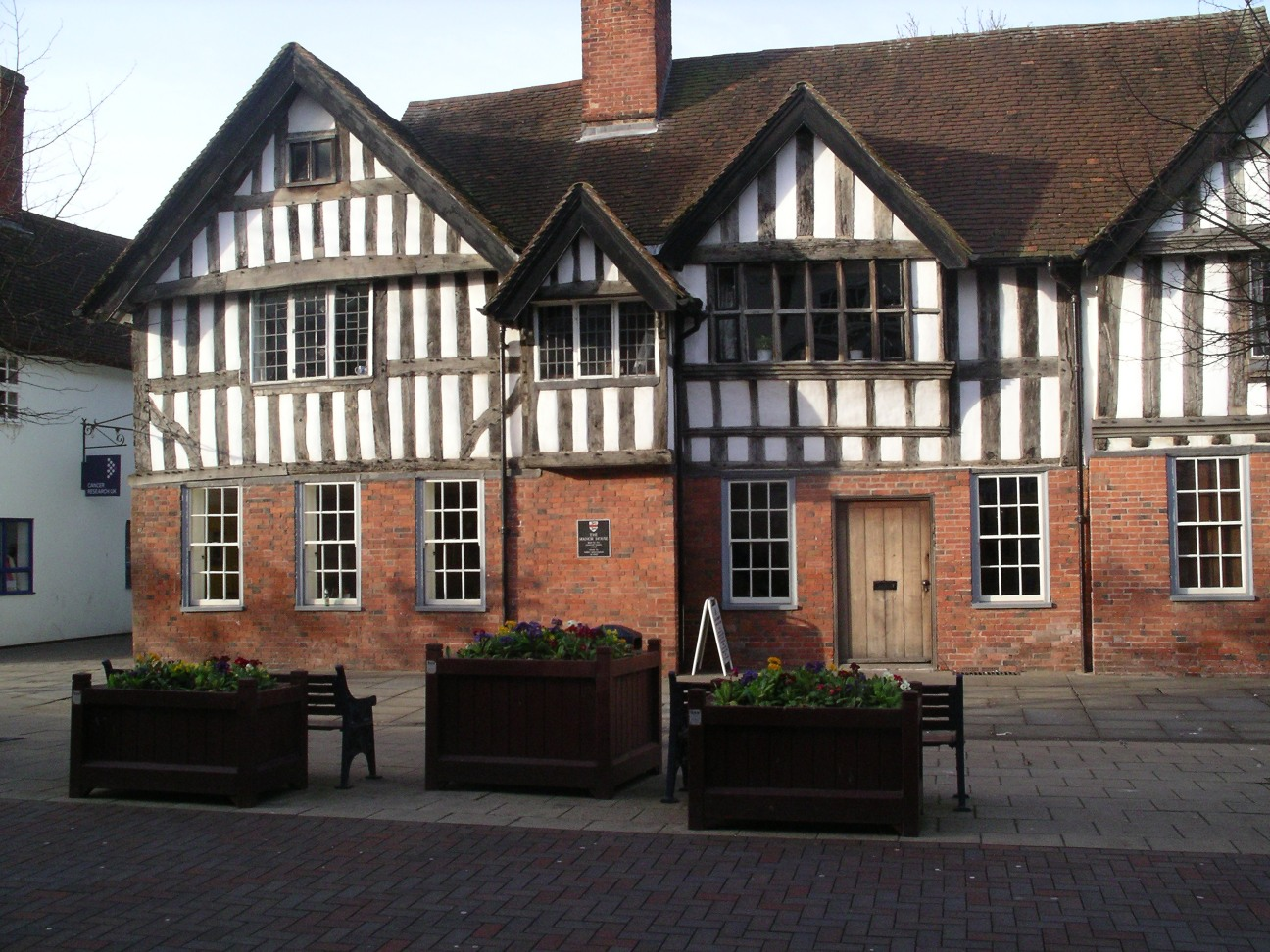
Lime Tree House, also erroneously known as "The Manor House", Solihull

The manor of Solihull remained property of the king for many years, and was passed through a number of custodians or lessees. In 1495 the Greswolde family of Solihull and nearby Kenilworth, while serving as the Kings custodians of the manor of Solihull, built the house on the Solihull High Street called Lime Tree House now erroneously known as the 'Manor House' (as no lord of the manor ever lived there – Silhill Hall was the manor house for Solihull).

The manor of Solihull was eventually granted to the Duke of Norfolk, who in turn passed it on in 1530 to the local Throckmorton family of Coughton Court. Solihull was owned by the Throckmortons during the Throckmorton Plot of 1583, and the planning of the 1605 Gunpowder Plot to blow up Parliament in which the Throckmortons were heavily involved. Their co-conspirators included the Catesby family of Lapworth (then part of the borough of Solihull), and the Digby family who were Lords of the Manor of Coleshill (much of which is part of the borough of Solihull today). They rented a house in London from Henry Ferrers of Baddesley Clinton (then in the borough of Solihull) to store the gunpowder. Sir Richard Walsh, owner of Walsh Hall in Meriden (part of the modern borough of Solihull) was the Sheriff of Worcestershire who eventually cornered and killed the gunpowder plotters. John Greswolde, brother of Robert Greswolde, of the wider Greswolde family of Solihull, was an attendant of Henry Garnet (a priest executed for his complicity in the Gunpowder Plot of 1605). It was said that when John was arrested and interrogated after the Gunpowder plot he was racked so badly at the Tower of London that it was rumoured he was dead.

The sub-manor of Longdon in Solihull meanwhile had passed to the Greswolde family, in the era of Elizabeth I, however it soon passed through a daughter to Thomas Dabridgecourt. In 1680, Henry Greswolde, then rector of Solihull, bought a large farm called Malvern Farm, in the Malvern part of Longdon Manor, to establish a new family seat, which would be called Malvern Hall.

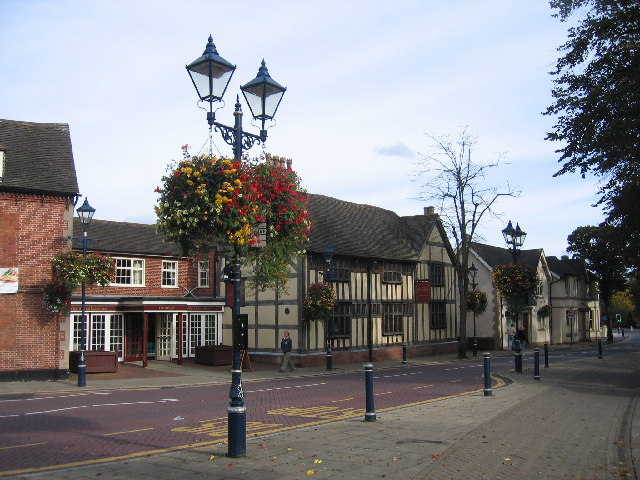
Historic Solihull town centre

In 1604 the Throckmorton family sold the Manor of Solihull to Edmund Hawes. The Hawes family were already prominent local landowners, having owned the Hillfields area of Solihull since 1311, when Thomas Hawes, a lawyer, purchased the land. William & Ursula Hawes had constructed Hillfield Hall in 1576, a grand Tudor hall with battlements and a long gallery. The hall oversaw five farms, including Hillfields and Shelly farm. William Hawes lived there until his death in 1611. Shelly had been a thriving hamlet during the 13th and 14th centuries, and included Monkspath, but there was little mention of the area by the 17th century. Hillfield Hall remains residential to this day, while the 16th-century Grade II listed Shelly farmhouse is an upmarket bar and restaurant.

The historic Solihull School was also founded in 1560 (although not on its present site). On the right along High Street from St Alphege Church porch is one of the town's oldest landmarks, the George, a hotel which dates from the 16th century.

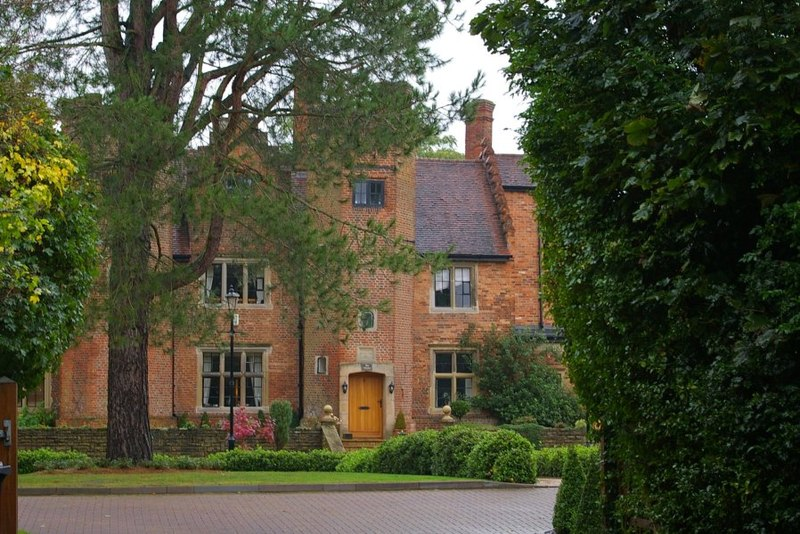
Hillfield Hall

Solihull appears to have survived the English Civil War of 1642–1651 relatively unscathed, even though many important close engagements and battles were fought nearby including the Battle of Edgehill to the south and the Battle of Camp Hill to the north. The very first skirmish between the Roundheads and Cavaliers took place just north of Solihull in the fields to the south of the nearby settlement of Curdworth in Warwickshire, called the Battle of Curdworth Bridge. Recent archaeological excavations unearthed evidence that a battle may have been fought at Coleshill Manor near the Solihull border. It is reported that Prince Rupert, commander of the Royalist forces, was on his way to meet King Charles in Solihull when he was skirmished by Parliamentary forces in the Battle of Kings Norton.

Before its eventual sale to the Greswoldes as part of the manor of Longdon, the Malvern area of Solihull had been the property of Parliamentarian commander Robert Greville. The Greville family remained important to the area, with Fulke Greville, 5th Baron Brooke being erroneously recorded as the Lord of the Manor of Longdon in 1682. A branch of the Greville family would make donations for schools in Knowle in the early 1700s.

=== Modern era ===
In the modern era, Solihull became quieter, with textile working and iron working still prominent in the town. The manor of Solihull continued to pass through a number of other holders including the Archer family of Umberslade Hall in Nuthurst. Eventually in 1850 it passed to Robert Short an officer in the East India Company, who left it to his son in law, John Couchman. The Couchmans remain the lords of the manor of Solihull to the present day.

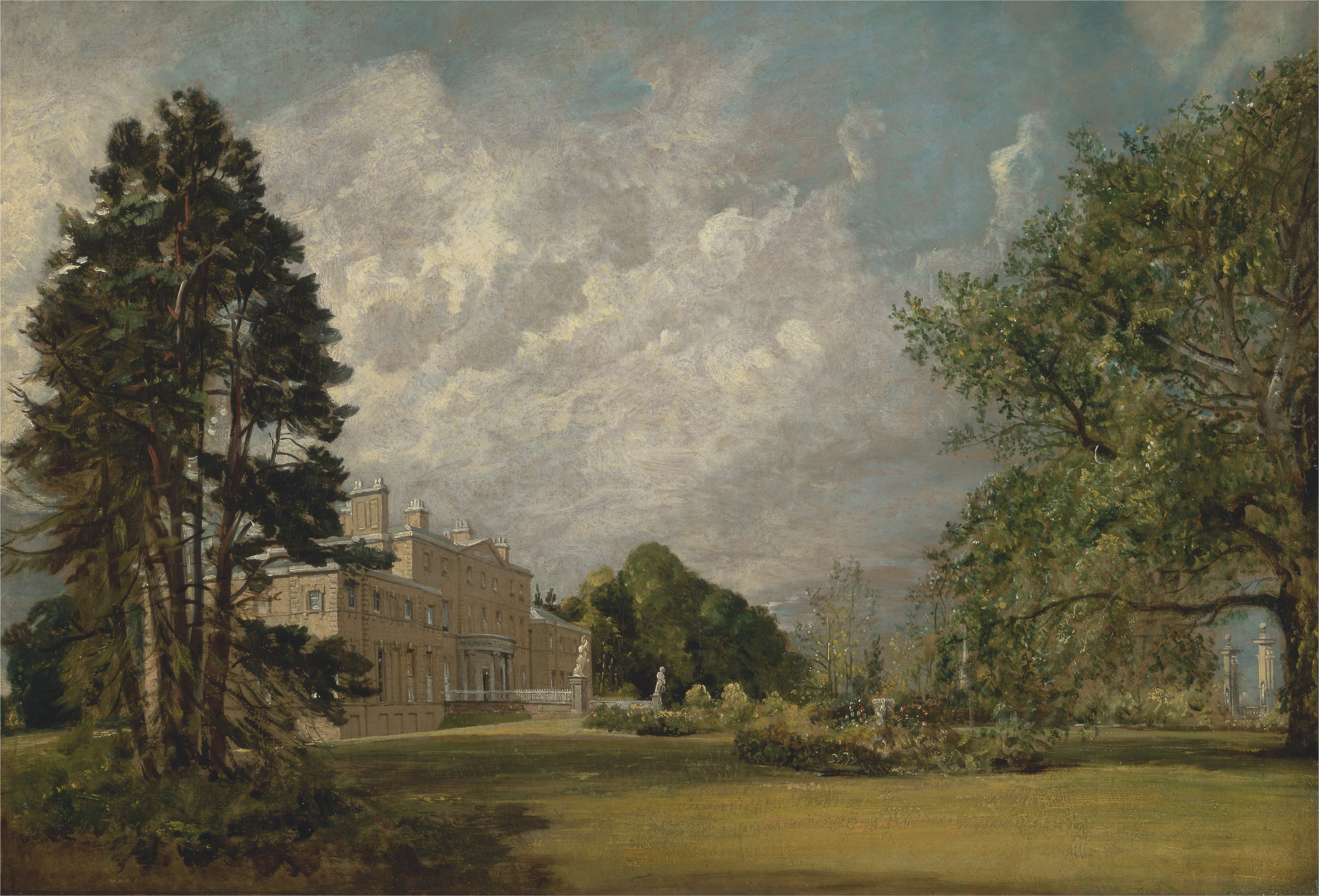
Malvern Hall by John Constable, 1821

By the 1700s, work was underway on Malvern Hall, with Humphrey Greswolde overseeing, it would be completed in the first half of the century. The hall featured a gatehouse onto the Warwick Road designed by Sir John Soane, architect of the Bank of England. In 1809 the hall would be painted by John Constable, for his patron, Henry Greswolde Lewis. The Greswoldes would later sell the house to Solihull council who converted the estate into Malvern Park. The hall is today part of Solihull School.

Also constructed in 1712, was Touchwood Hall at the end of Drury Lane on Teinters Green. The hall would serve as the home of the Holbeche family, former lords of the manor at Widney Manor and a prominent local family. The hall would later be held by the Madeley and Martineau families. The hall was demolished in 1963 but lends its name to Solihull's famous shopping centre.

During this time poets William Shenstone and Richard Jago attended Solihull School, where today, two houses are named after them.

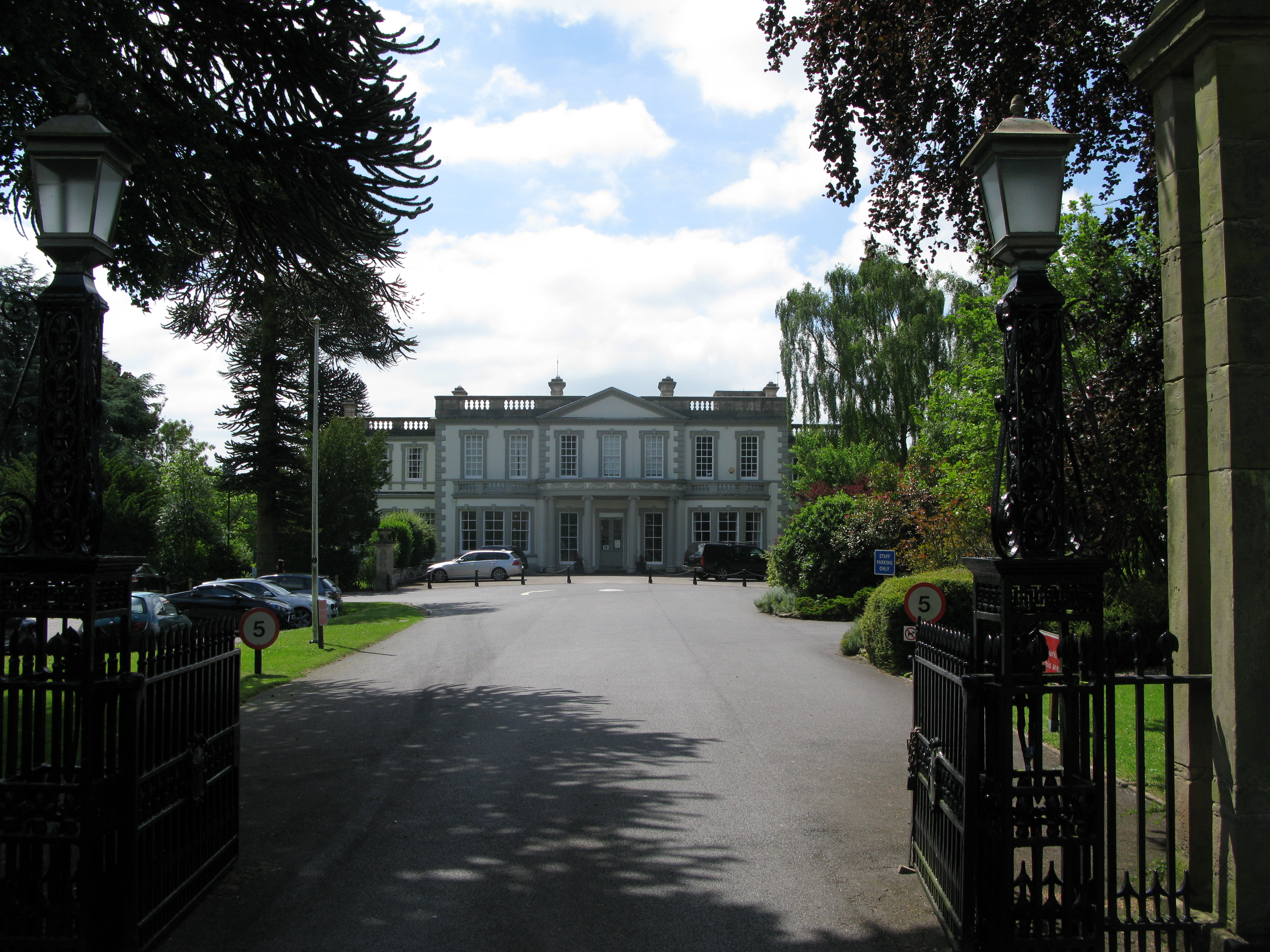
Solihull Malvern Hall

In 1775, Monkspath Hall was constructed. It captured the nation's media attention two centuries later when it was illegally demolished, sparking a court case which demanded it be put back exactly as it was.

In 1785, the Earl of Aylesford founded, and became patron of, the Woodmen of Arden. This is a prestigious society of toxophilites who meet to shoot longbows at their ground in the Forest of Arden in Meriden, in the borough of Solihull. The Woodmen target shoot at only one distance, 100 yards, and score in the Archers' disfavour. Archery had always been an important sport in Solihull. On the doorway of the church of St Alphage are incisions which are arrow sharpening marks from the 1360s when men were required to practice archery on a Sunday to ensure a ready supply of archers. The long marks have been made by Broadheads, the round by Bodkins – types of arrowheads used with the long bows of the time. The society is strictly limited to a membership of 80, with this rule only having been bent once, when in 1835 Prime Minister Sir Robert Peel, Lord of the Manor of Hampton in Arden, was added.

From 1838 to 1839, the local Catholic church, St Augustine of England Church was built in Solihull. It was designed by Augustus Pugin and paid for by the Pippet family of Solihull, with stained-glass windows made by the notable Birmingham manufacturer Hardman & Co.. In the late 19th century, further work was done on the church to the designs of Charles Francis Hansom.

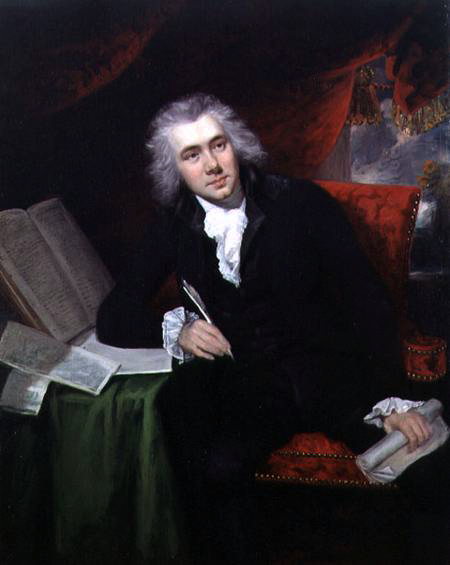
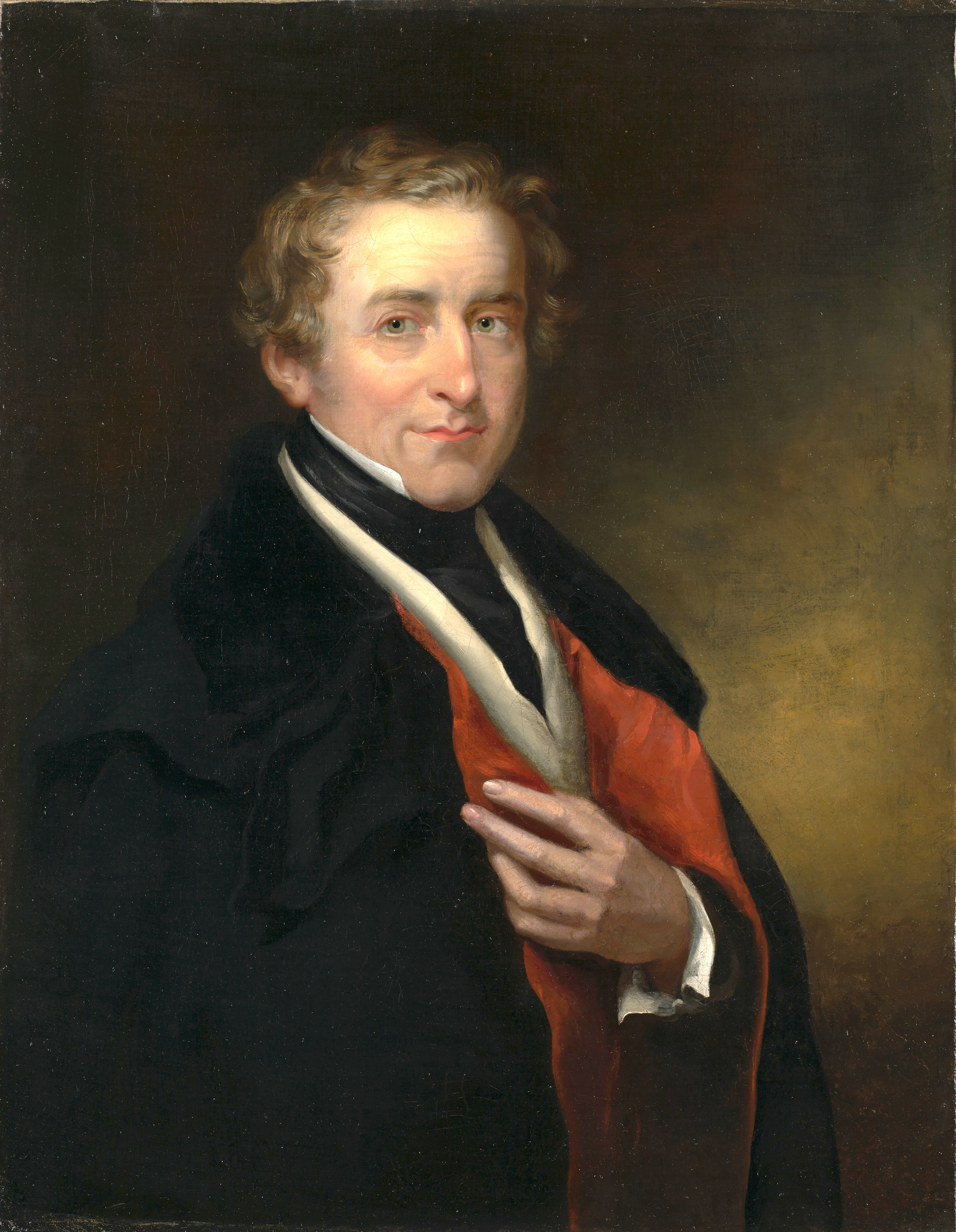
During the 19th Century the area was home to the country residences of abolitionist William Wilberforce (left) and Prime Minister Sir Robert Peel (right).

In the early 1800s, Isaac William Lillingston sold the Manor of Hampton in Arden to former prime minister, and founder of the modern police force, Sir Robert Peel. Peel and his son Sir Frederick Peel modernised and made improvements to Hampton in Arden, including the construction of a new manor house, (which is today the Michelin starred Peel's Restaurant).

It was also during the early 1800s that abolitionist William Wilberforce moved to the Elmdon area of Solihull following his marriage to Barbara Spooner, of the Spooner banking family who were the owners of Elmdon hall. A road – Wilberforce Way – is named for him north of Solihull town centre.

The manor of Longdon came to famous poet Lord Byron in 1815 by his marriage with Anne, daughter of Sir Ralph Milbanke Noel, and on her death in 1860 passed to her grandson the Earl of Lovelace. Two roads in Solihull are named after the family, Lady Byron Lane and Lovelace Avenue.

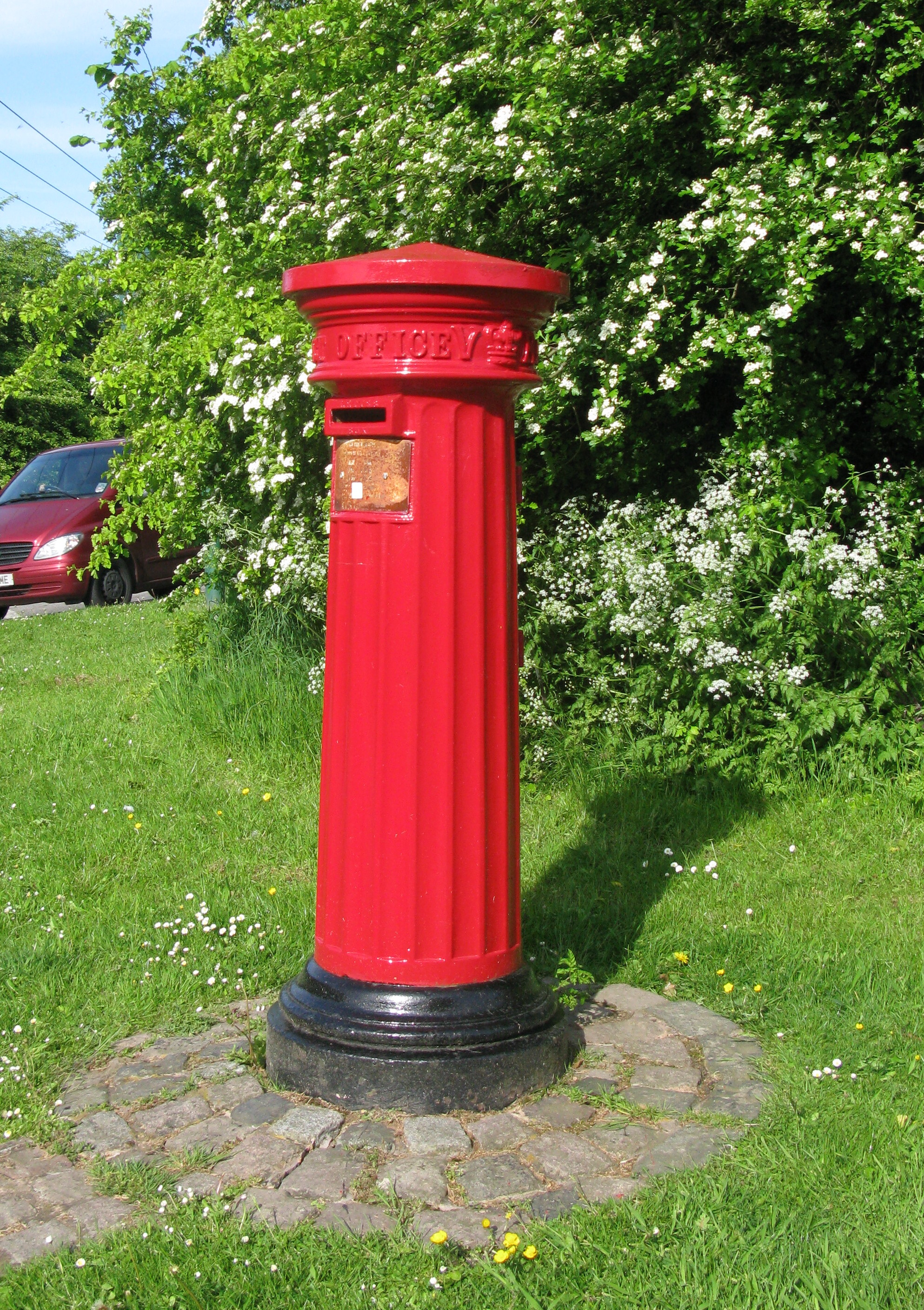
Dog Kennel Lane Post Box

Longdon Hall, with its remaining manorial rights, was later bought by a solicitor, J. B. Clarke of Birmingham in 1899 and soon afterwards sold to Alfred Lovekin, a silversmith. Lovekin also leased land near Solihull town centre from the Chattock family of Castle Bromwich, on which he built the Jacobean style Tudor Grange Hall. After Lovekin's death, Tudor Grange Hall was sold to Sir Alfred Bird, 1st Baronet, a chemist and politician, who would later leave the land for creation of a Tudor Grange grammar school and Tudor Grange Park. Longdon hall was eventually sold to a nearby golf course.

In 1868, George Muntz of nearby Umberslade, a campaigner for suffrage and friend of Thomas Attwood, would become the owner of the manor of Widney Manor. He would also later buy land in Bentley Heath and develop the Solihull area of Dorridge.

In the 1870s, the Hobday family would construct Monkspath Priory. The property would later serve Solihull as the Regency Club, a gentlemen's club and banqueting complex, before becoming a hotel in the late 20th century.

In 1870, metallurgist and inventor James Fern Webster moved to Whitlocks End on the outskirts of Solihull. While here, he discovered the process for making the extraction of aluminium sufficiently cost effective for the metal to be used in the manufacture of everyday objects. Before this, aluminium was considered a precious metal, with bars of aluminium exhibited alongside the French crown jewels in the Paris Exhibition of 1855. In 1878, Webster was producing 100 pounds of pure Aluminium every week at his Solihull Lodge factory.

In 1898, the Fowlers Cheese company – the oldest cheese manufacturer in England, founded 1670 – moved to its current site in Earlswood.

In the 1890s, famed pen manufacturer Joseph Gillott constructed New Berry Hall outside Catherine de Barnes. The architect of the hall was J. A. Chatwin who designed the Victoria Tower in the Houses of Parliament. Around this time Chatwin also designed School House at Solihull School.

Towards the end of this era telephone and postal services came to the town.

It was said the post office in Castle Bromwich, later part of the borough of Solihull, was one of the first locations to have a telephone installed outside of London. The purported reason for this is that in 1876 prime minister Benjamin Disraeli was visiting, supposedly to court Lady Bradford at Castle Bromwich Hall, and needed to be able to contact the government in London.

During the Victorian era a rare fluted pillar box was installed on Dog Kennel lane. Today it is grade II listed. The post box is designed to look like a Doric column.

=== 20th century ===
Unlike major cities to the north, the Industrial Revolution largely passed Solihull by, along with much of the rest of rural Warwickshire and, until the 20th century, Solihull remained a small market town. Local population growth was due to a number of factors, perhaps most significantly, the release of large tracts of land for housing development, attracting inward migration of new residents from across the United Kingdom.

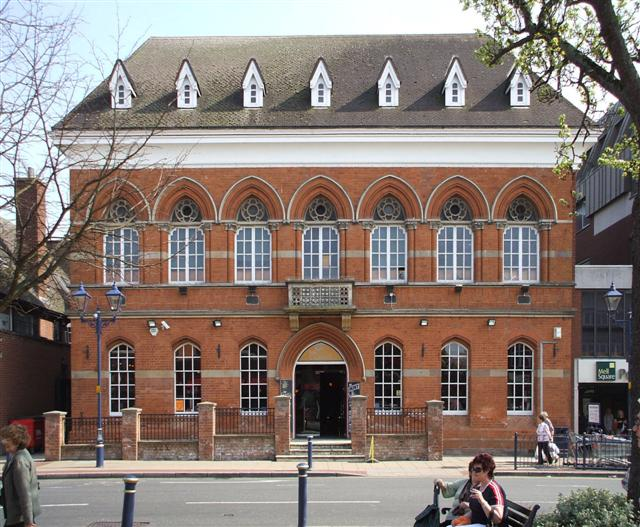
The Old Council House

In 1894, Solihull (including the parishes of Shirley, Baddesley Clinton, Barston, Lapworth, Balsall, Bushwood, Elmdon, Knowle, Nuthurst, Packwood and Tanworth-in-Arden) was made into the Solihull Rural District in the county of Warwickshire. In 1932, the rural district was abolished, with the built-up area forming the new Solihull Urban District Council while other parishes transferred to neighbouring rural districts.

Solihull School continued to grow during that period. Arthur Tolkien, father of J. R. R. Tolkien (the author of The Lord of the Rings series of books) was a pupil there during the 1860s. J. R. R. Tolkien mentioned Solihull and Solihull School in some of his letters. J. R. R. Tolkien's son Michael went on to teach at Solihull School in the 1950s. During the early 20th century, the poet W. H. Auden grew up in Solihull, on Homer Road. In 1909, Cathleen Cartland founded one of the country's first non-denominational co-educational preparatory schools - Ruckleigh School - in Solihull, many decades before others followed.

In common with most parts of the UK, Solihull and its borough was affected by the First World War. In 1914, the Army Remount Service, responsible for the nation's war horses (specifically collecting horses and dispatching them to combat areas) was headquartered in what is now the Wilson Arms in Knowle. The town and borough also provided a number of Auxiliary Hospitals. The village of Hockley Heath was bombed by a lost Zeppelin, L 62.

In 1936, two Solihull farms were bought for the construction of a shadow factory to prepare for war. The purpose of the shadow factories were to be as secret as possible, often located in rural areas, to prevent enemy bombing. After the war in 1948, this factory became the Solihull plant, home of the Rover car company.

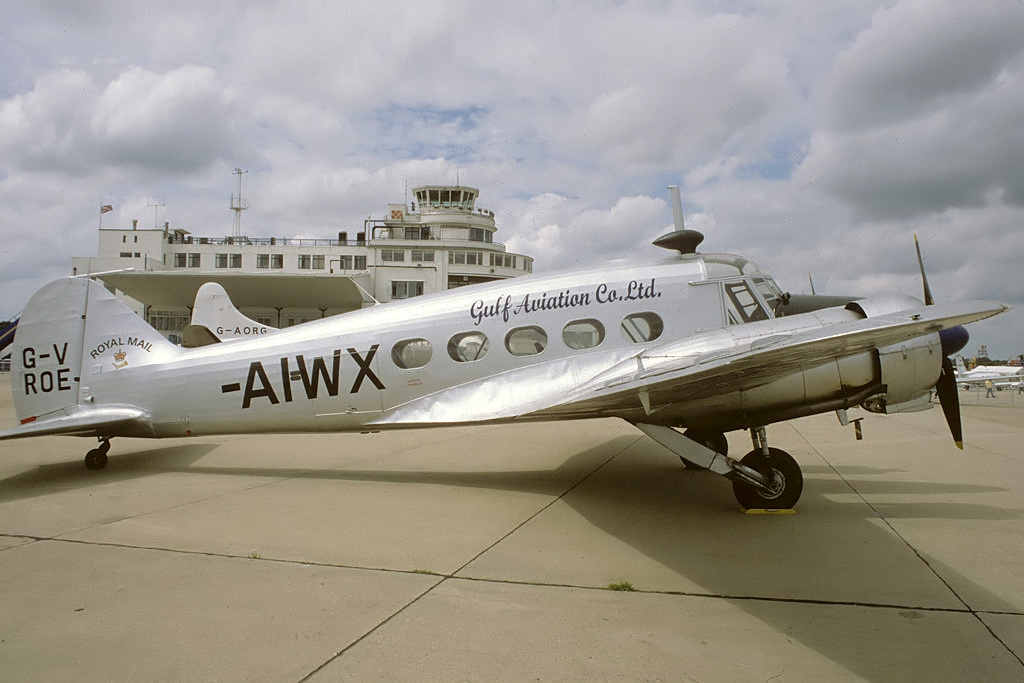
Avro 652A Anson T21 at the Elmdon Terminal, during the celebration of the 60th anniversary of the airport, 1999

On 8 July 1939, prime minister Neville Chamberlain and the Duchess of Kent opened "Elmdon Airport" in Solihull. The Elmdon Terminal, which incorporated the airport's air traffic control tower, is famous for having been designed by Norman and Dawbarn in the Art Deco style. Shortly after its opening, the airport was requisitioned for use in World War II, becoming RAF Elmdon. On 8 July 1946, the aerodrome was reopened to civilian operations, although it remained under government control. In 1960, control of the airport was handed to Birmingham City Council, and it was renamed "Birmingham International Airport". At that time, despite being England's second city, Birmingham was without an airport, and Elmdon Airport in Solihull was the closest. Reflecting the fact that Birmingham Airport was in Solihull and not Birmingham, Birmingham International railway station was provided to transport passengers over the 8 miles (13 km) journey to Birmingham. The airport and station are connected via Air-Rail Link. Amongst some Solihull residents, the airport is still affectionately known as Elmdon Airport.

By the time World War II began, Solihull had become a reception area for evacuated children from Coventry and the East End of London. Some barrage balloons, smokescreen generators and searchlights were erected around Solihull in an effort to confuse any enemy bomber aircraft flying over head on their way to critical major industrial areas. A military convalescent hospital was opened in Tudor Grange House, and a British Restaurant was opened up on Mill Lane. The town adopted the ship HMS Vivacious in 1942. In preparation for the D-Day landings, an American Army headquarters was established on Blossomfield Road. The town also had a Home Guard Battalion.

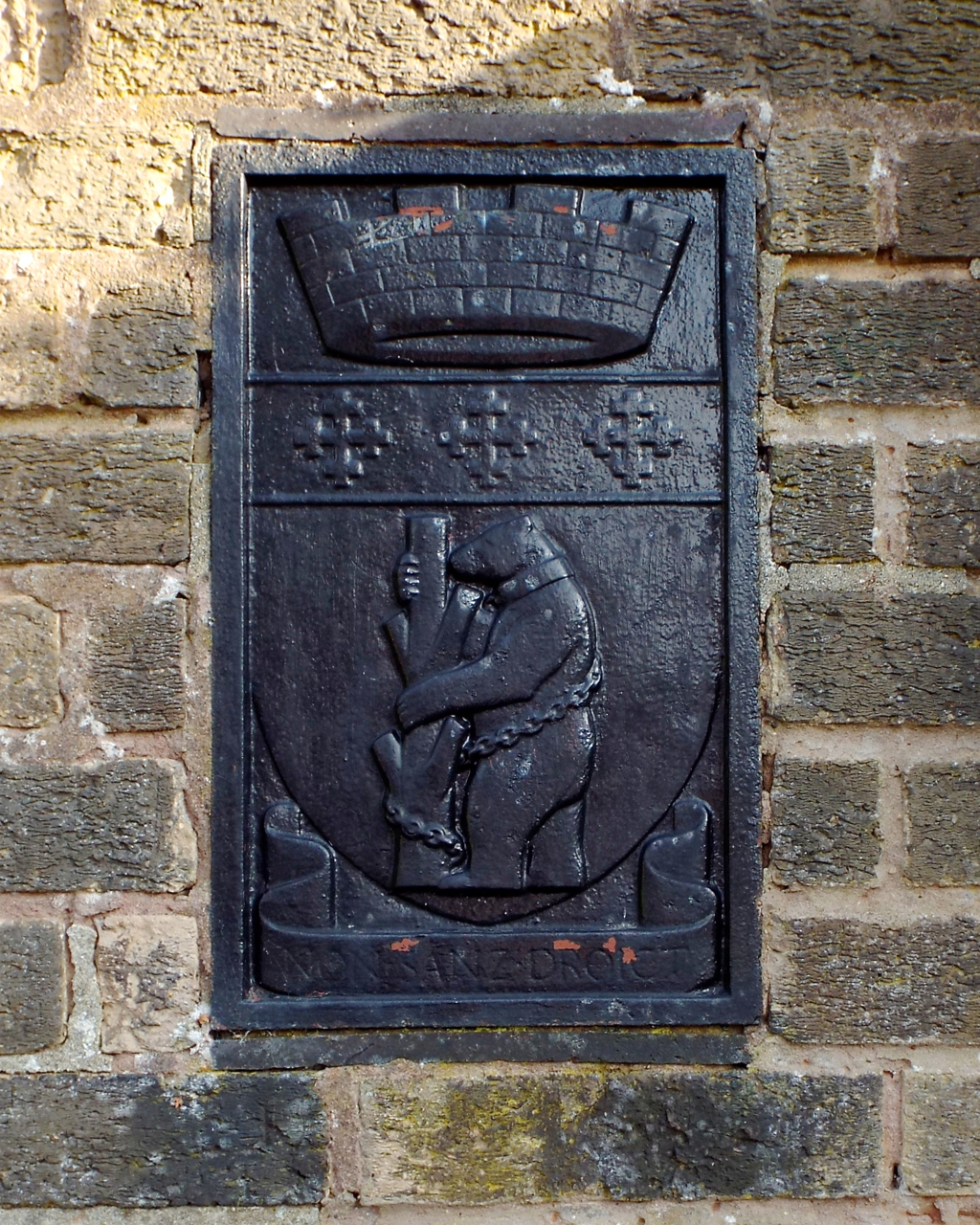
Warwickshire Coat of Arms at Ulverley School, showing Solihull's history as part of Warwickshire

In 1954, Queen Elizabeth II granted a royal charter of incorporation, making Solihull a municipal borough and, ten years later, it was given the status of county borough. Reorganisation of boundaries and council responsibilities in 1974 created the Metropolitan Borough of Solihull, by the merger of the Solihull County Borough and most of the Meriden Rural District, which forms the main rural part of the borough and county. It included Balsall Common, Barston, Berkswell, Bickenhill, Castle Bromwich, Chelmsley Wood, Elmdon, Fordbridge, Hampton in Arden, Hockley Heath, Kingshurst, Knowle, Marston Green, Meriden, Olton, Smiths Wood, Solihull, Shirley and Temple Balsall. A coat of arms was granted to the borough, with a Black Griffin taken from the arms of the Earls of Aylesford of Meriden, a Silver Fleur-de-lys comes from the Digby family associated with Coleshill and Fordbridge, and a Black Greyhound taken from the arms of the Greswolds, of Solihull town.

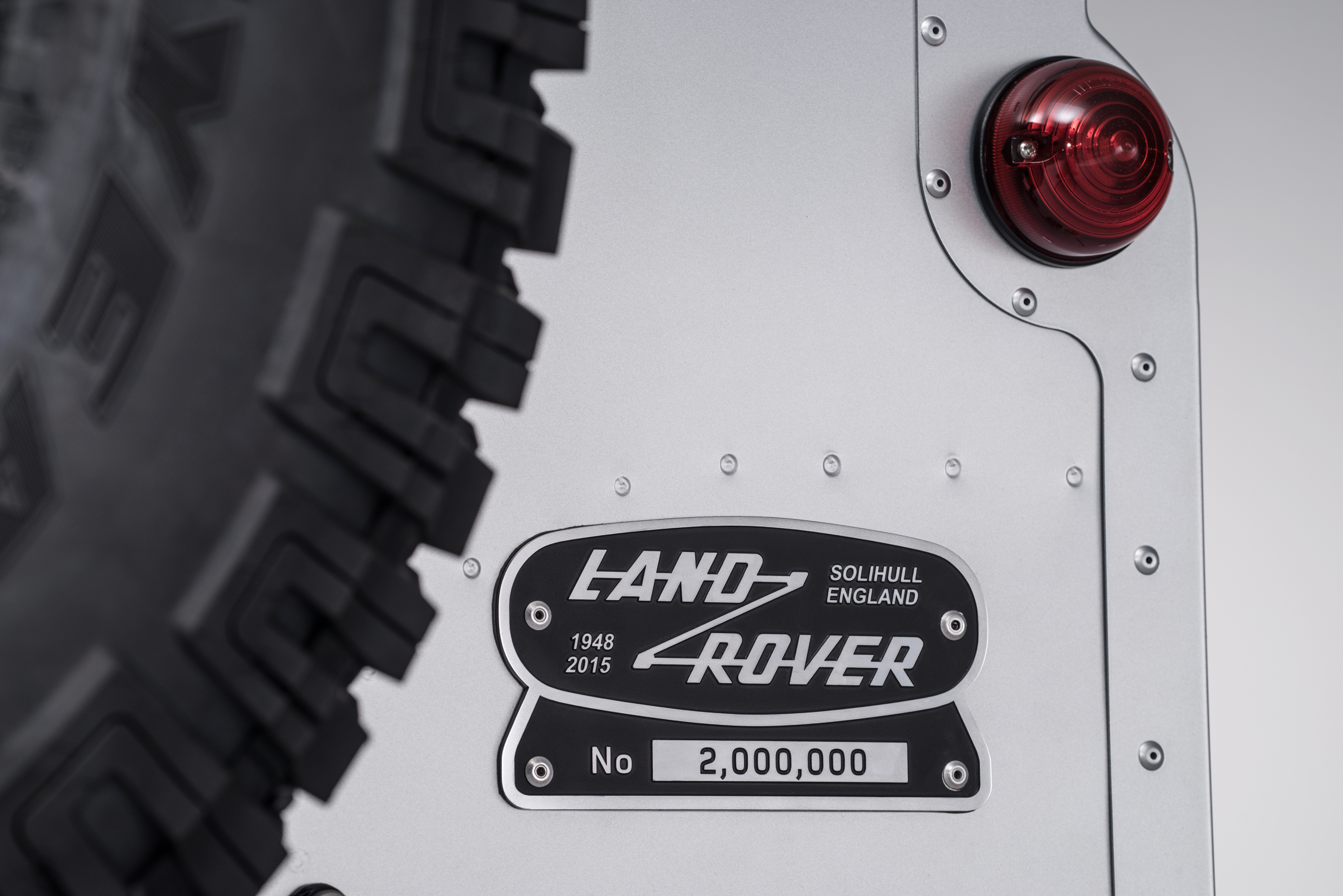
The Land Rover logo exhibits a "Solihull, England" mark

Until the early 1960s, the main high street remained much as it was in the late 19th century, with several streets of Victorian terraced houses linking High Street with Warwick Road. The construction of the central shopping area, named Mell Square, after W. Maurice Mell, the town clerk who planned the work, involved the demolition of properties in Mill Lane and Drury Lane, some of which were several hundred years old, together with the large Victorian Congregational church that had stood on the corner of Union Street and Warwick Road.

In 1966, Silhill Hall, the 13th century manor house in Solihull, was illegally demolished by the owner, Malcolm Ross, who unsuccessfully attempted to claim that a violent storm had made the structure unsafe. The site of the property is now used for housing, remembered only by the name of Silhill Hall Road.

In 1986, the Solihull borough effectively became a unitary authority, following the abolition of the county council. The borough is administered from a building on Church Hill in Solihull town centre.

On 23 November 1981, an F0/T1 tornado touched down in nearby Shirley. The tornado affected the Solihull Lodge neighbourhood, causing minor damage to Windmill Road.

=== Present day ===
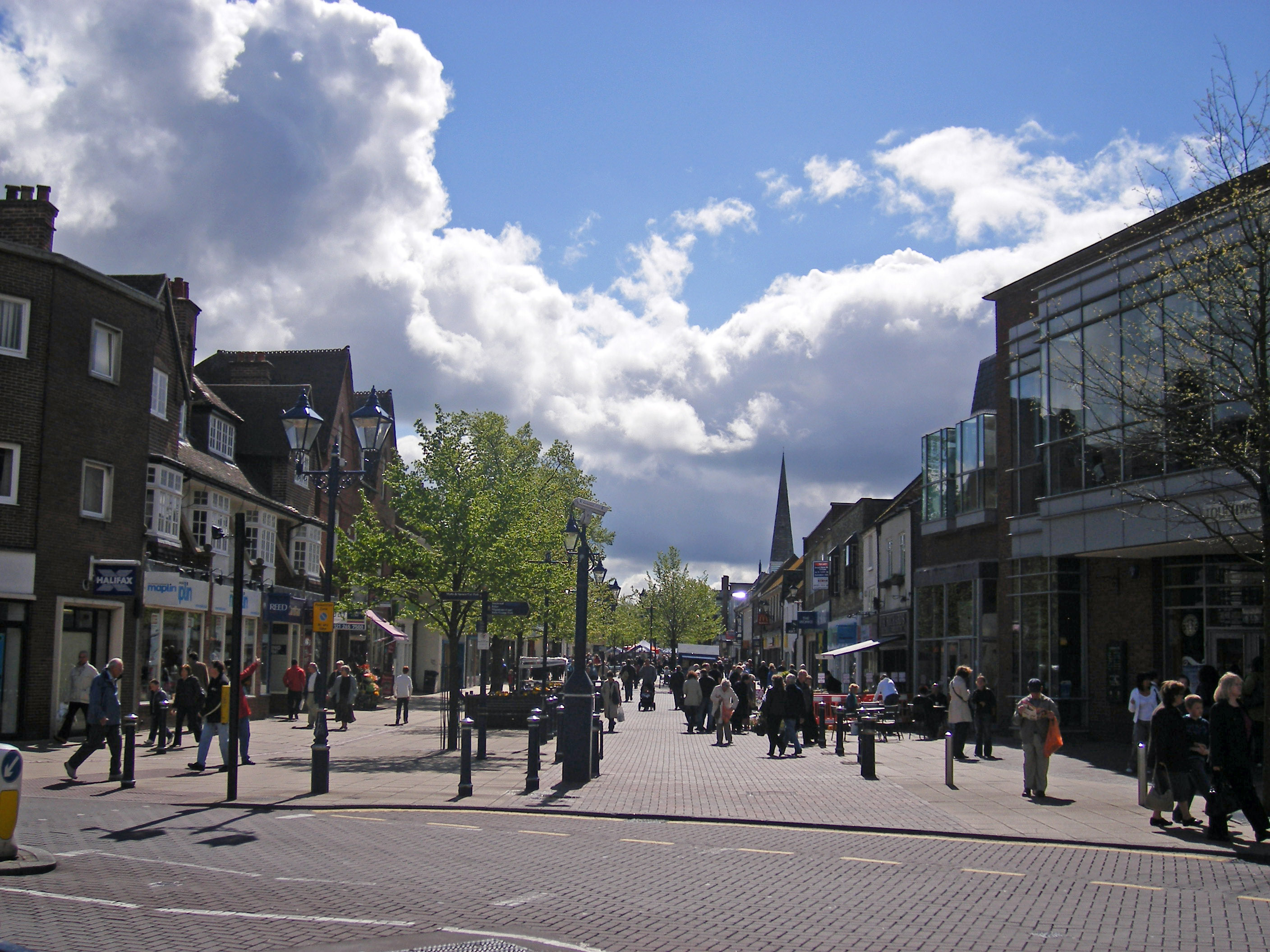
A look up High Street in Solihull

Despite its proximity to cities like Birmingham to the northwest, Coventry to the east, Worcester to the southwest and the built-up of conurbations around nearby Warwick, Stratford-upon-Avon, Sutton Coldfield, and Royal Leamington Spa, Solihull maintains a distinct identity and is bordered by greenbelt countryside to the south and east.

Solihull itself remains administered by Solihull Metropolitan Borough Council, effectively a unitary authority providing the majority of local government services. Regional administrative functions such as policing, fire and public transport are organised through the West Midlands administrative division and combined authority.

== Geography ==
Solihull is located in the historic Forest of Arden and on the banks of the River Blythe 127 m (416 ft) above sea level. The town, and most of the borough is within the West Midlands Green Belt.

The town is 8 miles (13 km) southeast of Birmingham, 14 miles (21 km) west of Coventry, 19 miles (31 km) northwest of Warwick and 110 miles (180 km) northwest of London.

The village of Meriden in the Borough of Solihull was historically regarded as the centre of England and marked the dividing line between England's north and south. A listed stone monument commemorating Meriden's status as 'Centre of England' sits on the village green. However, this was discovered to be inaccurate in the 1920s, when the centre of England was in fact calculated to be in Leicestershire.

== Governance ==
=== Local government ===
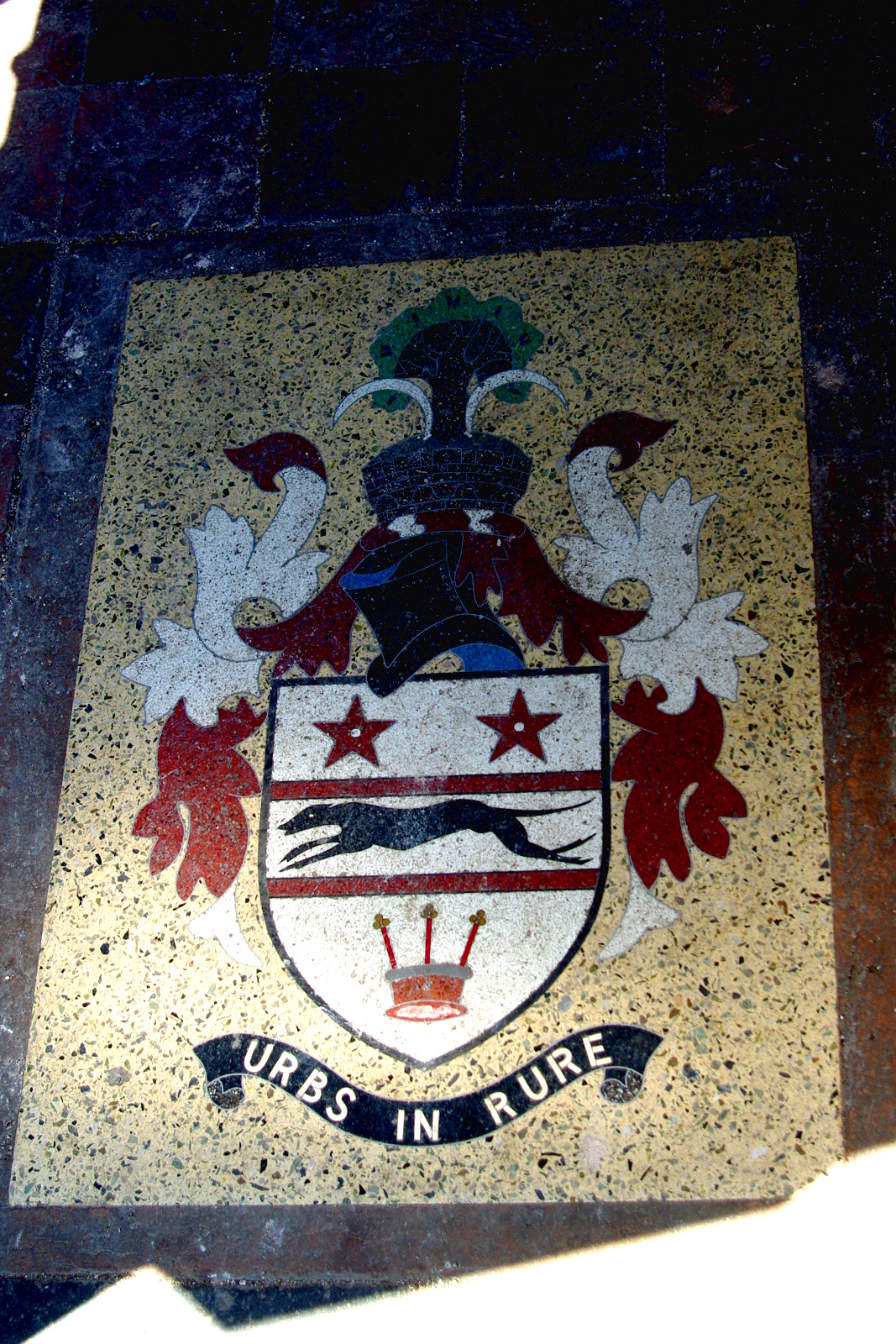
Coat of arms of the former county borough of Solihull commemorating prominent manorial lords and stewards of the town: Argent within two barrulets (for Throckmorton) between in chief as many pierced mullets (for Oddingsells) and in base a Saxon crown (for Princess Cristina) all Gules, a greyhound courant Sable (for Greswold).

Due to its growth, Solihull was promoted from an urban district to a municipal borough, the honour being bestowed by Princess Margaret, who waved from the balcony of the Old Council House in March 1954.

Queen Elizabeth II opened the new civic hall in the town in May 1962. The town became a county borough in 1964. In 1974, the Solihull county borough was merged with Meriden Rural District to form the Metropolitan Borough of Solihull. This also includes the districts known as Shirley, Knowle, Dorridge, Balsall Common, Castle Bromwich and Chelmsley Wood.

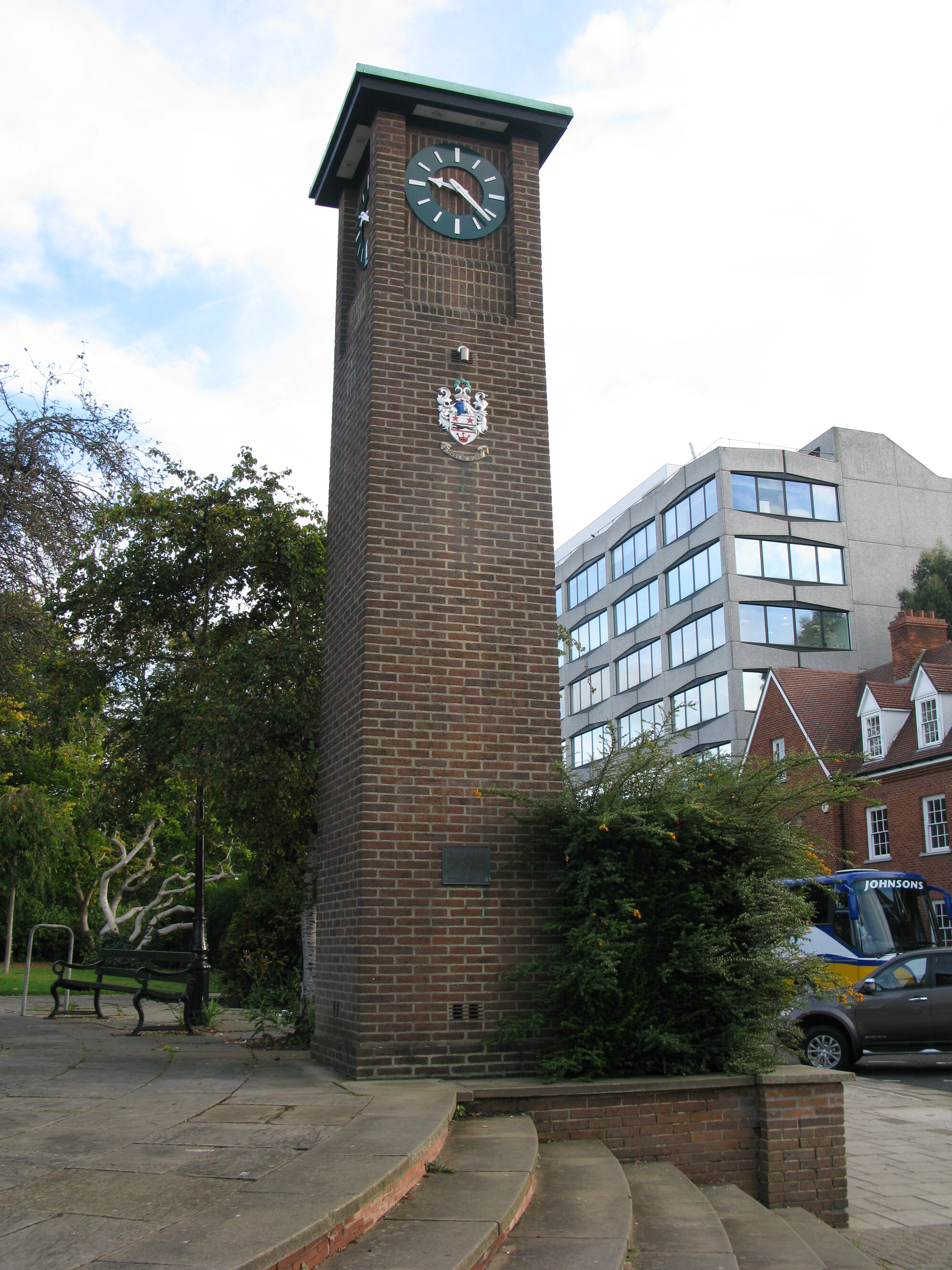
Solihull clocktower, erected to mark the elevation of Solihull to a county borough in 1964

There are now 17 wards in Solihull; Olton, Knowle, Dorridge, Silhill, Blythe, Meriden, Elmdon, Lyndon, Smith's Wood, Chelmsley Wood, Hockley Heath, St. Alphege, Shirley West, Shirley East, Shirley South, Kingshurst & Fordbridge, Castle Bromwich and Bickenhill. Each ward is represented by three councillors at Solihull Metropolitan Borough Council, making a total of 51 councillors. The mayor is elected by the council and is currently (2022) Ken Meeson of the Conservative Party.

There are parish councils serving villages across the wider borough.

=== Regional and national government ===
Regionally, Solihull comes under the West Midlands Combined Authority, and therefore also takes part in elections for the Mayor of the West Midlands and the West Midlands Police and Crime Commissioner.

The member of parliament for the Solihull West and Shirley constituency is Conservative Dr Neil Shastri-Hurst, who won his seat in 2024 after the constituency was created in 2023. The seat is one of three parliamentary seats within the Borough of Solihull, the others being Meriden and Solihull East constituency, named for the village of Meriden within the Meriden Gap and the third is the Birmingham Hodge Hill and Solihull North constituency.

=== Traditions ===
Traditionally the mayor of Solihull is driven in a Land Rover – usually a Range Rover – with the licence plate 'Sol 1', reflecting the towns connection to the Land Rover vehicle manufacturer.

Although the town and borough of Solihull are in the West Midlands metropolitan county, Solihull is in the historic county of Warwickshire. This means the town can fly the flag of Warwickshire and celebrate "Warwickshire Day", when an official date is agreed upon. Some local support has been recorded to return the borough entirely to Warwickshire, such as when Bath was returned to Somerset after the abolition of the county of Avon.

== Education ==
=== Higher education ===
Solihull has no university, but there are seven universities within 16 mi (26 km) of the town in the surrounding cities. However, Solihull College offers several foundation degree and full degree courses, particularly in technical subject areas such as computer sciences and engineering. These courses are offered through the college's partner, the University of Warwick.

=== Further education ===
There is also a sixth form college located on the outskirts of the town centre. This is known as Solihull Sixth Form College.

=== Independent schools ===
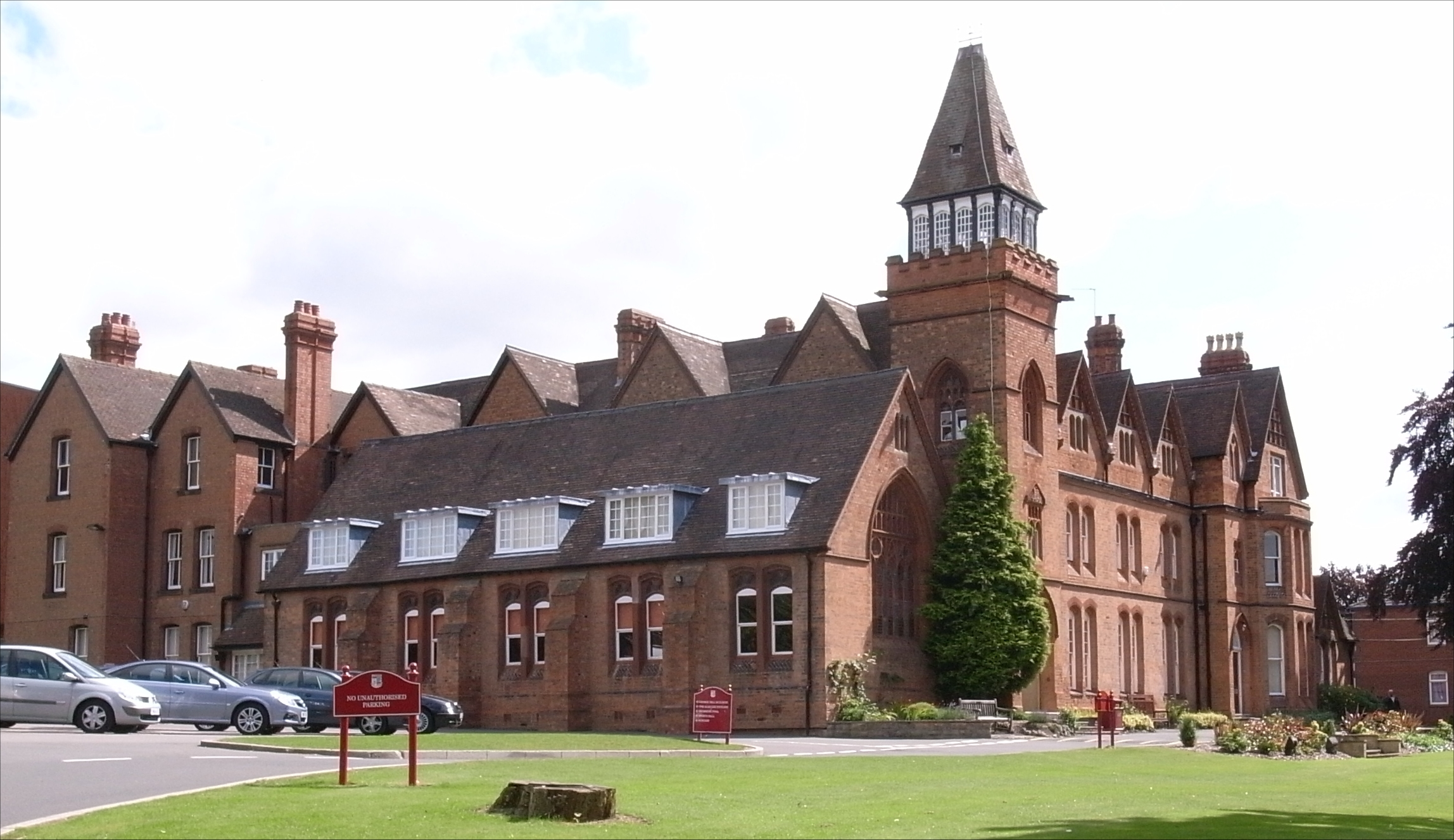
Solihull School

Solihull School is an independent school and is located on Warwick Road near the centre of the town. It was founded in 1560 and celebrated its 450th anniversary in 2010. It merged with independent girls school St Martins School in 2020.

Ruckleigh School was an independent preparatory school founded in 1909 by Cathleen Cartland and was notable for being a nondenominational co-educational school many decades before any others followed. Ruckleigh was permanently closed on July 8, 2026, at the end of the school term, due to 'cost-of-living pressures'. Another co-education preparatory school called Eversfield Preparatory School, founded in 1931 by Cyril Denney, is also located in the town.

=== State-funded schools ===
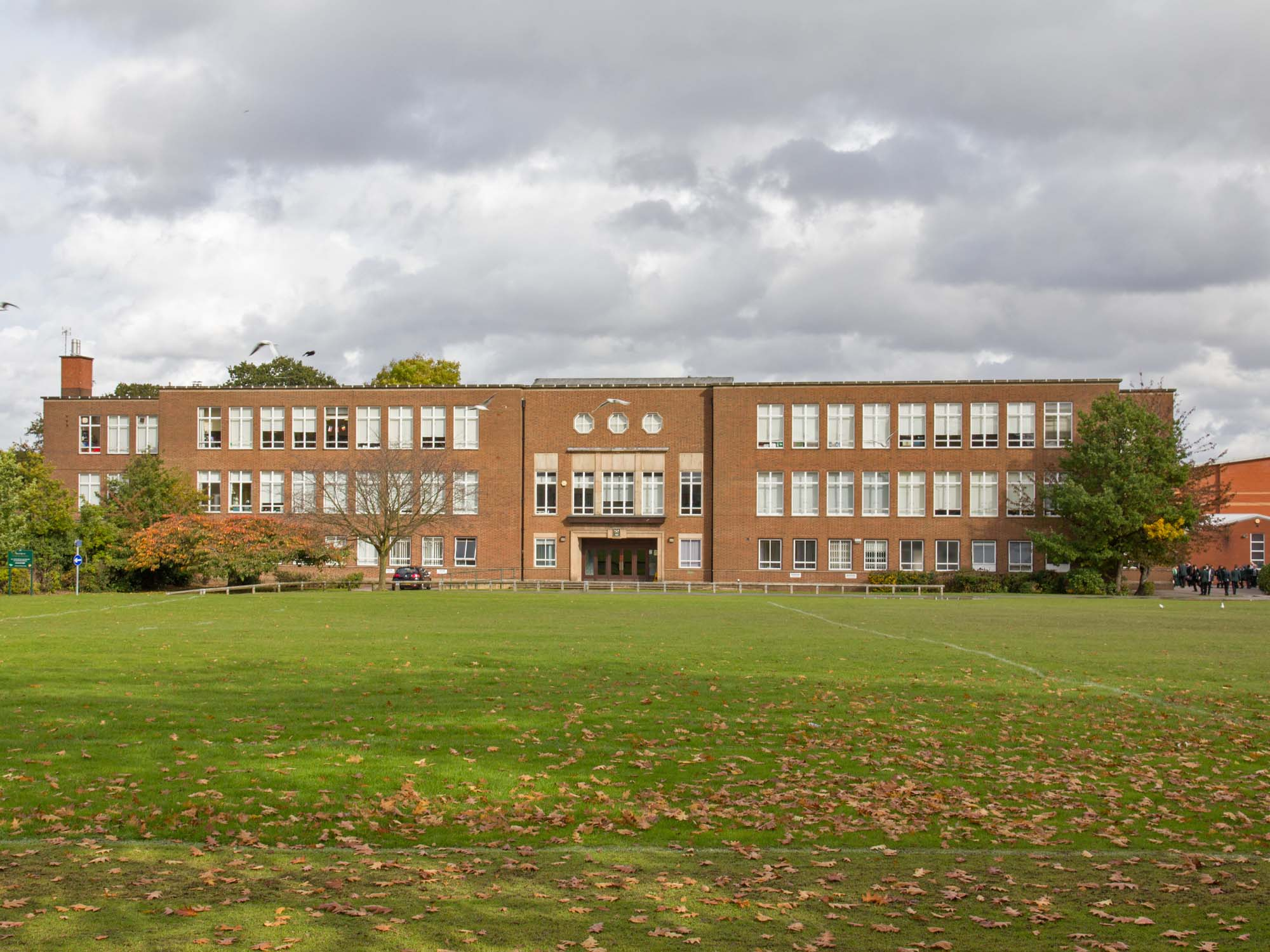
Tudor Grange Academy

The town centre is also well served by some high performing state schools. Tudor Grange house, a now grade II listed property, was completed in Solihull in 1887 for Alfred Lovekin, a silversmith, who later sold the estate to Sir Alfred Bird, the owner of Bird's Custard then produced at the Birmingham Custard Factory. The Bird family bequeathed the house and estate to the people of Solihull for the construction of a 'Tudor Grange' grammar school around the turn of the century. After Tudor Grange grammar school had been established on this site, other parcels of the estate were passed on by the school for other neighbouring schools, colleges and parkland. Tudor Grange Academy and Solihull School continue to enjoy a friendly sporting rivalry centred around rugby union. Solihull's state schools, Tudor Grange Academy and Arden Academy, regularly feature in good school guides, such as "the Tatler guide to the best state secondary schools".

Solihull had a 'Wave 1' proposal of the Building Schools for the Future investment programme approved. They were awarded over £80 million to transform six schools in the north of the borough in December 2004. As a result of the funding, there will be six new schools constructed within seven years. The school curriculum will be redesigned as well as a further £6 million investment in managed ICT services. The six schools to be rebuilt are Park Hall Academy, Smith's Wood Academy, Archbishop Grimshaw, Lanchester Special School, Forest Oak School and Merstone school. Forest Oak and Merstone have been already rebuilt on one site. Lanchester, Park Hall and Smith's Wood have been built by BAM PPP, under 'private finance initiative'. Archbishop Grimshaw has been built by BAM PPP under a traditional contract.

== Transport ==
=== Road ===
A number of main roads pass through Solihull including the A41 Birmingham to Warwick road and the A34 Birmingham to Stratford road: the A34 becomes the commercial centre of Shirley, making for a busy town-centre feel along the main road.

The M42 and the M40 both pass through the outskirts of the borough of Solihull, providing very rapid links to Oxford and London in the South East, and to the rest of the motorway network surrounding the West Midlands region. The M42 opens up to the M5, providing links to Cheltenham, the West Country and South West England.

=== Rail ===
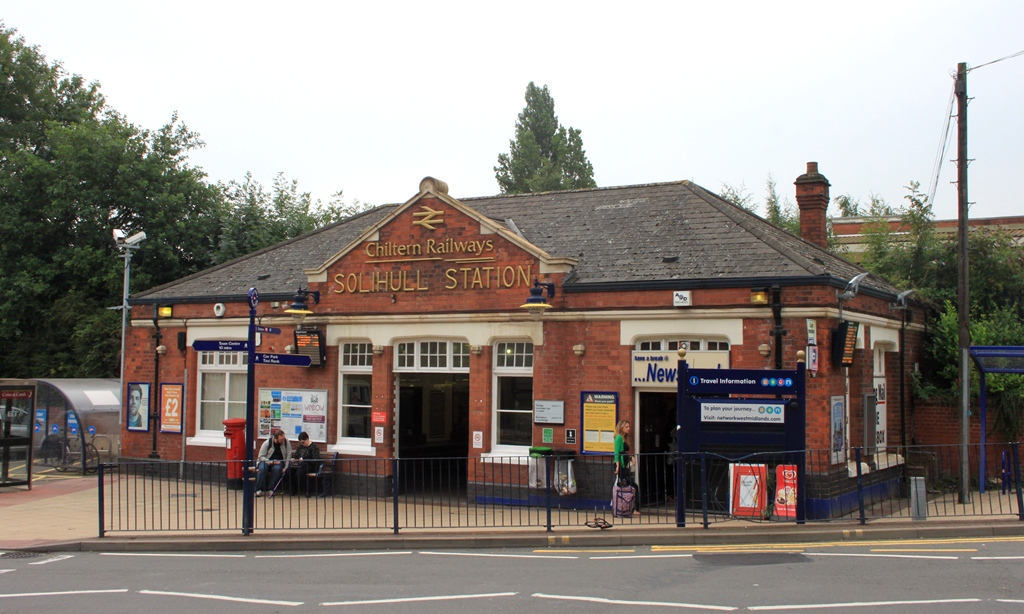
Solihull station

Solihull railway station is on the former Great Western Railway line to London Paddington although trains now run along the Chiltern Main Line terminating at London Marylebone.

Other railway links are provided on the West Coast Main Line, as Birmingham International railway station lies within the borough's boundaries and offers frequent express connections to London. Express train services through Solihull are now run by Chiltern Railways and local services by West Midlands Railway. Cross Country trains pass through the station but no longer stop here.

Since 2023 the luxury train Midland Pullman – an HST set operated by Locomotive Services Ltd repainted in replica Blue Pullman livery – runs tours from Solihull along the Settle to Carlisle railway.

Solihull will be served by a HS2 interchange station, putting London just 38 minutes away by train.

=== Bus ===
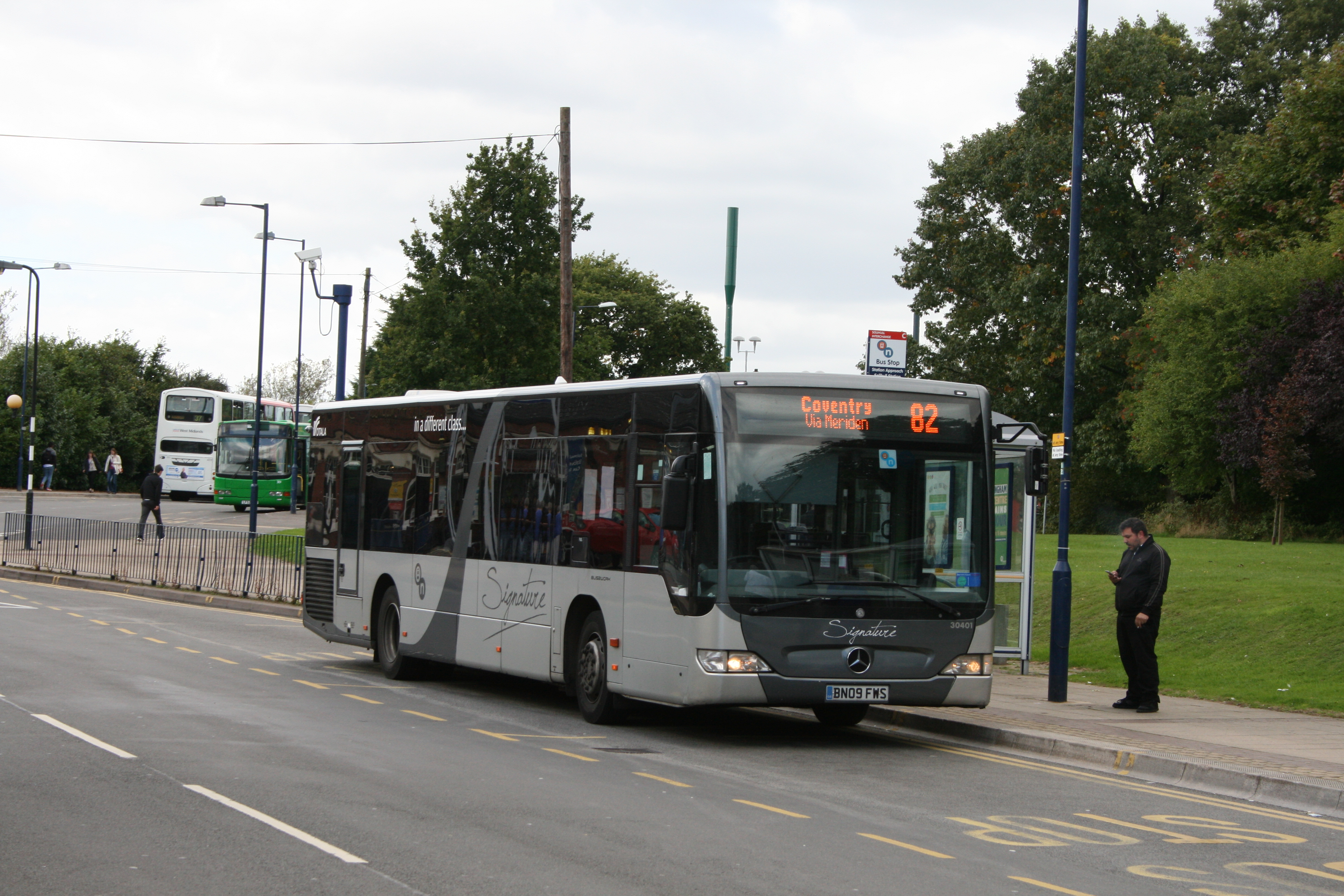
A Mercedes-Benz Citaro bus in Signature livery in Solihull

Local bus services are provided largely by National Express West Midlands from their Yardley Wood and Acocks Green depots in south and southeast Birmingham respectively. Other services are provided by Landflight who operate a number of local services, and Stagecoach operating Stratford to Solihull and Solihull and Coventry.

In preparation for the 2022 Commonwealth Games held across the West Midlands and Warwickshire, Transport for West Midlands constructed a new bus rapid transit network of tram style buses. The network, known as Sprint, uses dedicated lanes and zero-emission tram style buses which provide off-board ticketing, multiple-door boarding, wheelchair and pushchair access, free Wi-Fi, and air conditioning as well as on-board audio visual announcements and travel information. The network connects Solihull town centre, Birmingham Airport, the National Exhibition Centre and future HS2 interchange (all in Solihull) with Birmingham city centre, and other parts of the region, such as the Royal Town of Sutton Coldfield. Any green space lost as part of Sprint's proposals will be replaced according to the local highway authority tree replacement policy. Work commenced on the network in March 2021.

=== Canal ===
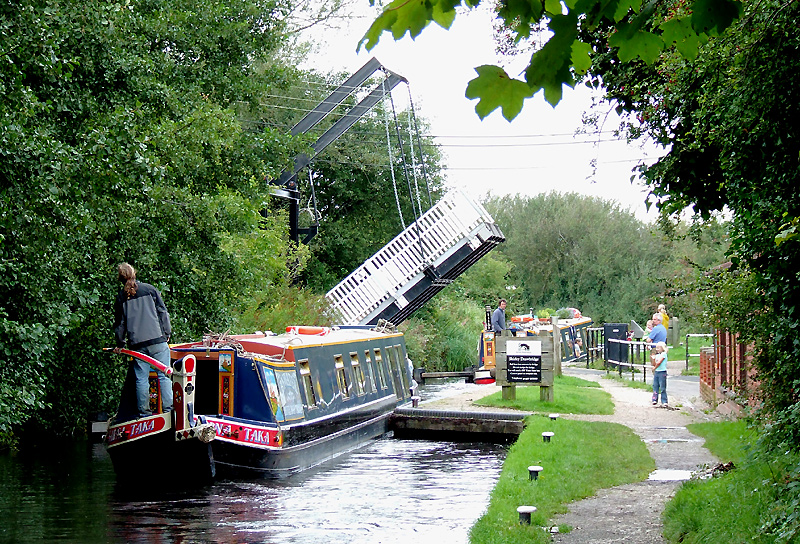
A Narrowboat on the Canal in Shirley

The Grand Union Canal passes across Solihull, coming within 1 mi (1.6 km) of the town centre and linking the town to the River Thames in London. There are a flight of five locks at Knowle added in the 1930s which are wide enough to allow narrowboats to navigate together, side by side.

The Stratford-upon-Avon Canal passes through Hockley Heath in the Borough of Solihull. Hockley Wharf (now a pub) served the rest of the surrounding Solihull area and beyond. Non-perishable goods were unloaded there, including timber, lime, coke, coal, cement, bricks and salt. The last commercial load was brought into the wharf on Christmas Eve, 1929.

=== Bicycle ===
Bicycling in Solihull is popular, and as of March 2021 it was announced that Solihull would benefit from a cycle hire scheme, where residents and visitors would be able to hire bikes from an app on their phone. Three free to use cycle repair stations are being installed across the borough, and new cycle lanes added.

=== Trams ===
In 2024, work will commence on an extension to the Transport for West Midlands West Midlands Metro tram network down to Solihull. The extension will link up to Birmingham Airport, the National Exhibition Centre and future HS2 interchange with the wider network, before continuing on through the region, going as far south as the University of Warwick.

=== Air ===
Birmingham Airport is located in the Elmdon part of Solihull and was known as Elmdon Airport until control passed from the government to Birmingham City Council in the 1960s, as Birmingham itself was without an airport. Elmdon Airport was 8 miles from Birmingham, but still closer than any other contender. The airport is connected to the NEC and Birmingham International Station via the Air-Rail Link people mover.

== Demographics ==
At the 2021 census, there were 107,728 residents in the built-up area of Solihull, up from 104,905 in the 2011 census, and 100,369 at the 2001 census.

In terms of ethnicity in 2021:

- 76.4% of Solihull residents were White
- 17% were Asian
- 1.5% were Black
- 2.8% were Mixed.
- 1.6% were from another ethnic group.

In terms of religion, 52.4% of Solihull residents identified as Christian, 29.6% said they had no religion, 8.6% were Muslim, 4.9% were Hindu, 3.6% were Sikh, 0.3% were Buddhists, 0.2% were Jewish, and 0.4% were from another religion.

=== Hong Kong community ===
By 2025, the community had about 4,500-5,000 people with Hong Kong origins. The 2020 Hong Kong national security law was a factor that pushed them out of Hong Kong. By 2025, Solihull had Hong Kong-style food establishments.

== Economy ==
=== Retail ===
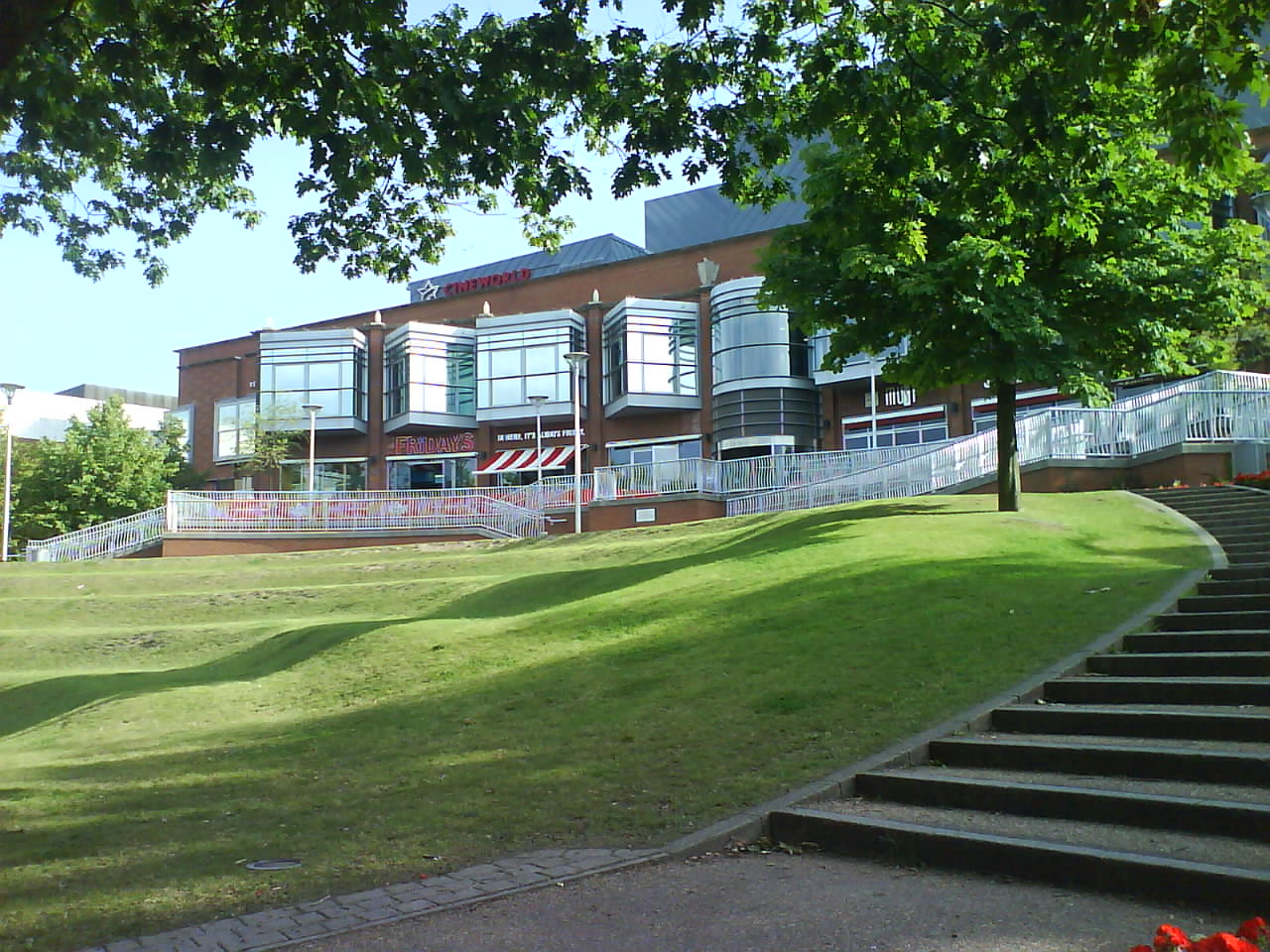
Touchwood, Solihull

Solihull offers a variety of shopping facilities. In recent years, the town has undergone much development, and its High Street has been pedestrianised since 1994. On 2 July 2002, a large new shopping centre, Touchwood, was opened by Queen Elizabeth II. The Crown Estate has an equity interest in the shopping centre. In 2014, the town was listed as one of the top five destinations for shopping in the UK. In addition to the Touchwood shopping centre, it also has an open-air 1960s-style shopping centre called Mell Square which was constructed following the demolition of several terraces of Victorian houses and the original Solihull Congregational Church. When Mell Square was first opened, it was known for its large block of fountains, which were switched off and removed in the late 80s. In recent years, some residents have called for the fountains to be returned. Luxury vehicle sales also make up some of the Solihull economy, with a dealership for Rolls-Royce, and other luxury car marques, present in the town.

=== Industry ===
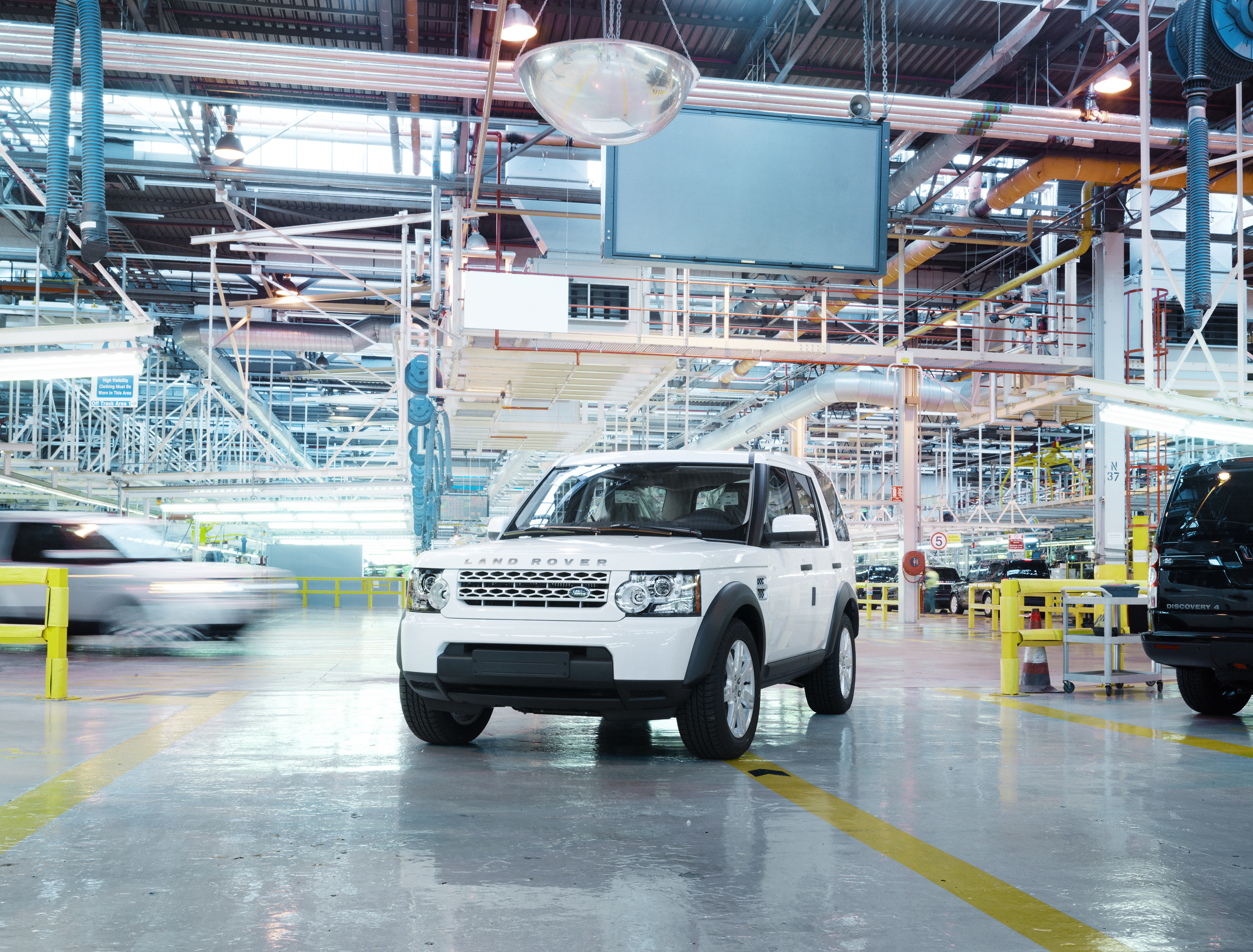
The Land Rover Solihull plant

Solihull is the home of the four-wheel-drive car manufacturer Land Rover. Its main production plant, Solihull plant, is situated east of the Lode Heath district, along with a range of other major companies. Engineering and professional services firm Arup have a large presence in Solihull. Fitness apparel manufacturer Gymshark has been based in Solihull since 2012 and women's fashion and lingerie brand Lounge moved their headquarters to Solihull in 2021.

The Solihull village of Meriden was the famous home of the Triumph motorbike factory from 1942 to 1983. In January 2021 motorcycle company Norton announced they would be investing in a technologically advanced production site and headquarters in Solihull. The Lucas company, which supplied lighting and electric components to the motorcycle and aerospace industries was also headquartered in Solihull for many years, with a research facility in Shirley, now a housing development called Lucas Green.

=== Food and beverage ===
Food and drink production and hospitality also make up part of the local Solihull economy. Earlswood in the Solihull borough is home to Fowlers, established since 1670, it is the oldest cheese-making business in England. The company still makes all its cheese by hand. In Catherine de Barnes is the Silhill Brewery. The former home of retail bakers Three Cooks was based in Solihull, and after it was brought out of administration in 2006, the new company Cooks the Bakery retains its HQ in Solihull. The pub company Enterprise Inns is also headquartered in Solihull. The Grenade Protein Bar company, valued at £200m in 2021, is based in Solihull, having been started by a couple from Solihull in 2010.

There are a number of restaurants and eateries in Solihull, including the Michelin starred Peel's Restaurant.

=== Service sector ===
Financial services make up some of the Solihull economy. Personal loan provider Paragon, and retail and commercial bank Secure Trust Bank are both based in Solihull.

The National Exhibition Centre is within the borough of Solihull, which hosts a number of national trade shows, such as The Horse of the Year Show and The Crufts International Dog Show. The Blythe Valley Business Park is also both within the borough of Solihull. Both have excellent links to Birmingham Airport and the M42, M40 and M6 motorways.

=== Third sector and charity ===
A number of regional and national charities are based in, or have offices in, Solihull. Royal Star and Garter Homes a charity founded in 1916 to provide care for ex-Service people and their partners who live with disability or dementia, operates one of its three state of the art care homes in Solihull.

== Culture ==
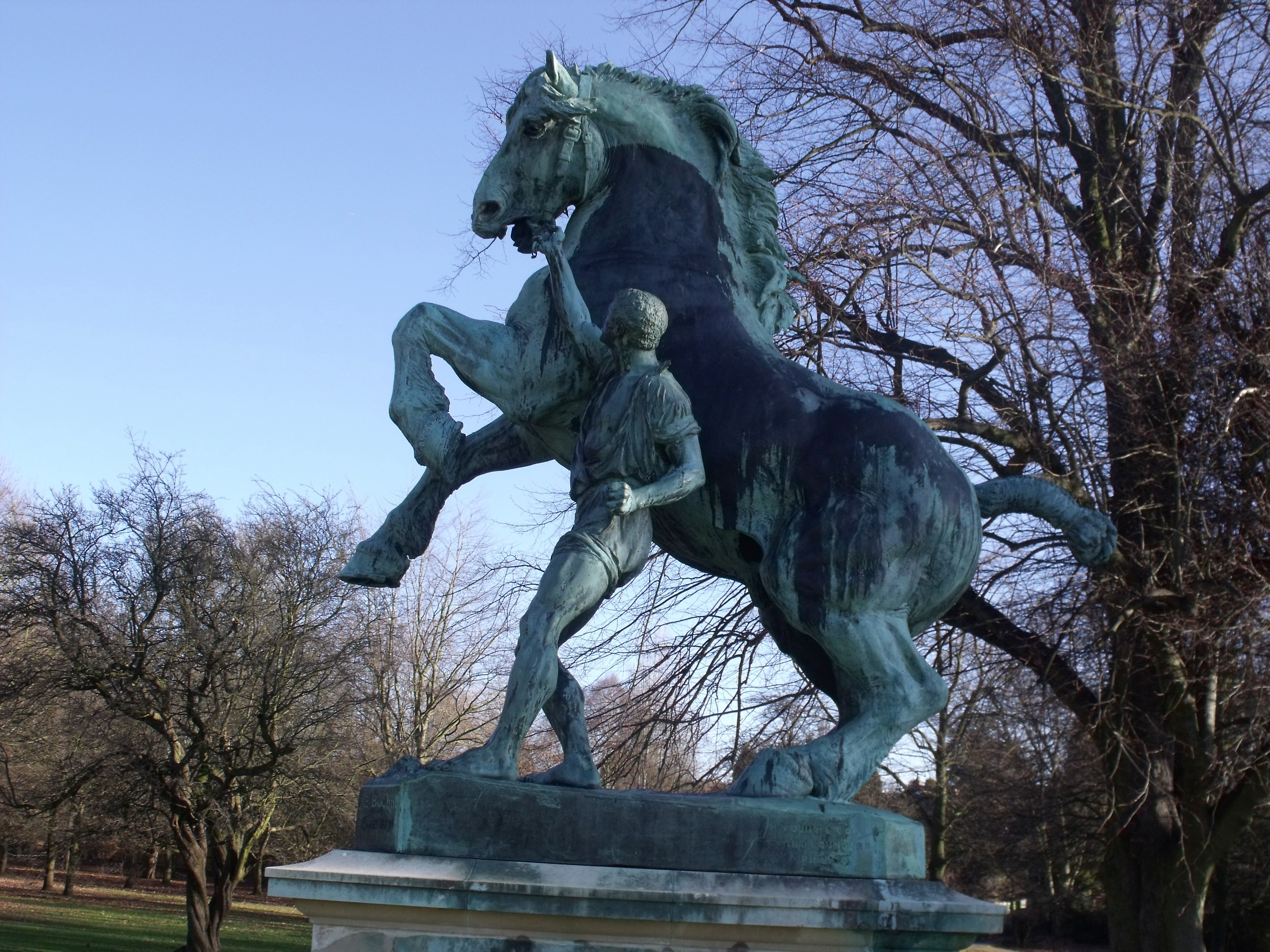
Statue of a Horse and Tamer in Malvern Park, Solihull, by artist Sir Joseph Edgar Boehm. Donated to the town by Captain Oliver Bird, High Sheriff of Warwickshire.

=== Screen and stage ===
Solihull is home to the Core Theatre, part of the Solihull Arts Complex. The centre of Solihull has a Cineworld cinema. There is another Cineworld cinema with an IMAX screen in the Resorts World shopping centre in the borough.

=== Music and dance ===
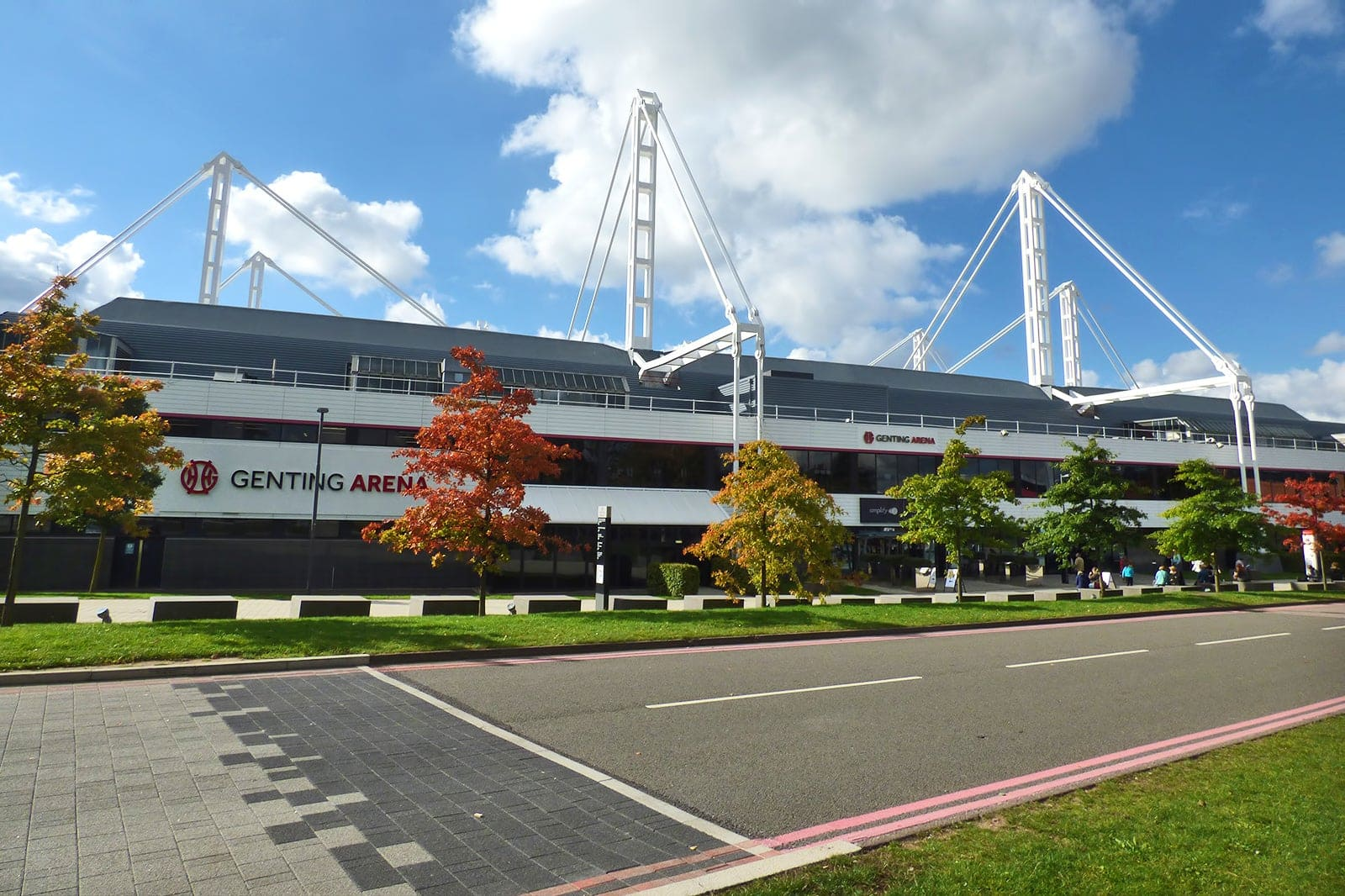
BP Pulse Live under old branding

In Solihull is the bp pulse LIVE (formerly LG Arena, Genting Arena, and Resorts World Arena), a multipurpose indoor arena with a capacity of 15,685 opened in 1980 with a concert by Queen. A number of internationally renowned acts have performed there in recent years, including Lady Gaga and Adele. In 2019, Resorts World Arena, as it was known at the time had the fifth highest ticket sales of an arena venue in the United Kingdom.

Solihull has a symphony orchestra founded in 1990.

The town has a professional ballet school, which teaches according to the International Dance Teachers Association syllabus.

The town has a troop of mixed border Morris dancers called Silhill Morris.

=== Art and museums ===
Solihull is home to a large number of public sculptures and art works. There are also a number of museums, galleries and historic properties open to the public.

The Solihull Arts Complex includes the Courtyard Gallery and Art Space, an exhibition space and gallery. The town also has a number of private art galleries.

Reflecting the town's British motorcycle heritage, as home to the Triumph Motorcycle company for many years, Solihull also has the National Motorcycle Museum. The museum was founded in 1984 and is affiliated to the British Motorcycle Charitable Trust. The museum has become the largest collection of British motorcycles in the world, with over 250,000 visitors a year.

Berry Mound is the site of an Iron Age hill fort dating back to the 1st century BC in Shirley, Solihull, on the Worcestershire border.

Hobs Moat in Olton, Solihull, is the site of the ruined 12th-century castle of the Lords of the Manor of Solihull. Today it is a scheduled ancient monument and local nature reserve. The ruin itself is now below ground level, but the moated earthworks remain above the ground level.

Baddesley Clinton is a 13th-century grade I listed moated manor house in the village of Baddesley Clinton on the border of the borough of Solihull managed by the National Trust.

Packwood House is a grade I listed Tudor manor house on the outskirts of the borough of Solihull managed by the National Trust. It was home to the Featherston family, who would later marry into the Dilke family of nearby Maxstoke Castle. They also provided the first usher at Solihull School, where a house is named Featherston. The yew tree topiary garden of Packwood House is also famous in its own right, and is supposed to symbolise the Sermon on the Mount. Packwood church, known as St Giles, was the location of the marriage of the parents of Samuel Johnson, author of the first dictionary. Samuel's mother, Sara Ford, was from Packwood and St Giles was her parish church.

Berkswell Mill is a historic windmill in the borough of Solihull which is occasionally open to the public.

There is a historic miniature steam railway founded in 1936 in Illshaw Heath in the borough of Solihull.

== Media ==
The town is covered by the local television news programmes, BBC Midlands Today and ITV News Central.

Local radio stations are:

- BBC Radio WM
- Heart West Midlands
- Smooth West Midlands
- Greatest Hits Radio Birmingham & The West Midlands
- Capital Midlands
- Hits Radio Birmingham
- Solihull Radio, a community based station which broadcast from the town.

The Solihull Observer is the town's local newspaper which publishes Thursdays.

== Communal facilities ==
=== Parks and local nature reserves ===
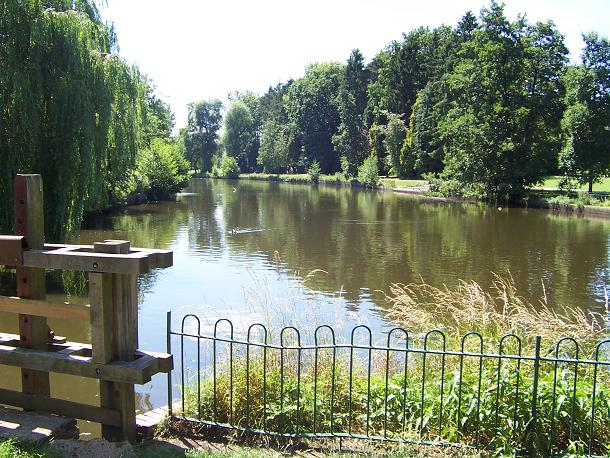
The Lake, Brueton Park, Solihull

Solihull has a number of parks and local nature reserves, including the UK's first dedicated hedgehog conservation area.

The nearest parks to the town centre are Malvern and Brueton Parks. They are interlinked and cover a total area of about 130 acres (0.53 km^{2}). Brueton Park used to be part of the grounds of Malvern Hall, which dates back to about 1690. Tudor Grange Park is also close to the town centre. The River Blythe, a headwater tributary of the River Trent, passes through parts of Solihull including Malvern and Tudor Grange Parks. Hillfield Park is on the outskirts of the town centre.

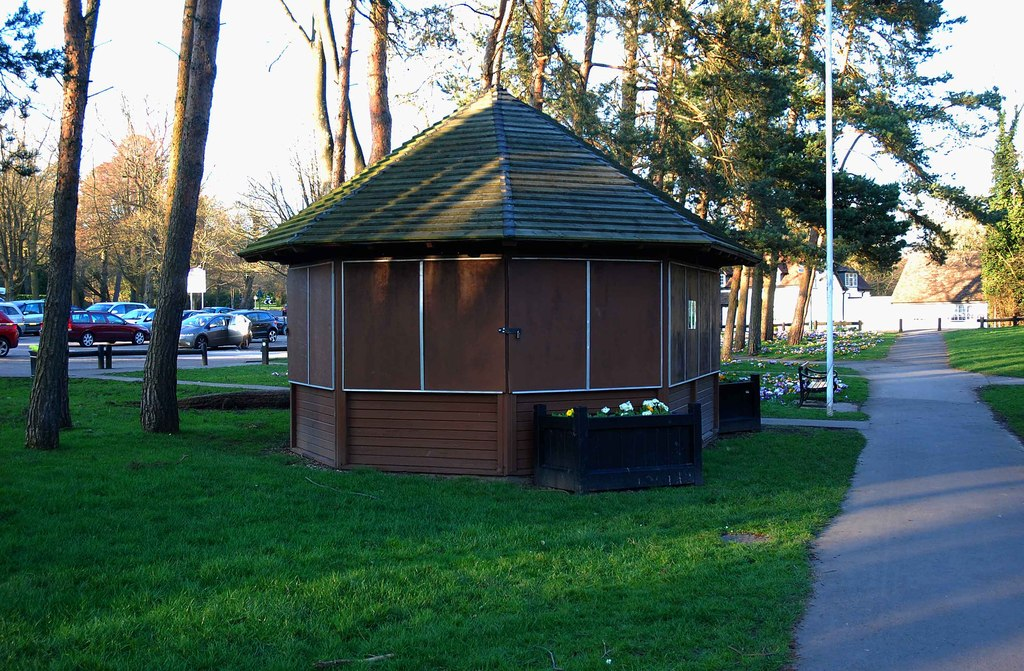
Kiosk, Malvern Park, Solihull

Other parks across the borough include Elmdon Park, Cole Bank Park, Knowle Park, Langley Hall Park and Shirley Park. Nature reserves across the borough include:

- Alcott Wood in Moorend Avenue, Chelmsley Wood; 5.7 hectares (14 acres) of semi natural ancient woodland, designated in 2002.
- Babbs Mill in Fordbridge Road, Kingshurst; 24 hectares (59 acres) of mixed grassland, lake and woodland habitats, designated in 2000.
- Bills Wood, in Bill's Lane, Shirley; 7 hectares (17 acres) of semi natural ancient woodland, designated in 1991.
- Dorridge Wood, in Arden Road, Dorridge; 7.5 hectares (19 acres) of semi natural woodland, designated in 2000.
- Elmdon Park, at Elmdon Manor, Solihull; 4.6 hectares (11 acres) of former walled garden, managed by Warwickshire Wildlife Trust, designated in 1995.
- Harry's Wood, between Naseby Road and St Helen's Road, also known as Coldlands Wood; 9.9 hectares (24 acres) of dense woodland, designated in 2020.
- Jobs Close in Longdon Road, Knowle; 3.5 hectares (8.6 acres) of grassland and woodland with pond, designated in 2004.
- Palmers Rough, in Jacey Road, Shirley; 6.5 hectares (16 acres) of semi natural woodland, designated in 2000.
- Malvern & Brueton Park in Old Warwick Road, Solihull; 30 hectares (74 acres) of mixed grassland, woodland and marsh, designated in 2002.
- Millisons Wood, in Albert Road, Meriden; 11 hectares (27 acres) of semi natural ancient woodland, designated in 1993.
- Smith's Wood in Windward Way, Smiths Wood; 4.5 hectares (11 acres) of semi natural ancient woodland, designated in 2004.
- Yorks Wood, in Fordbridge Road, Kingshurst; 10 hectares (25 acres) of semi natural ancient woodland, designated in 1991.

== Leisure and tourism ==
Solihull's leisure sector has seen growth in recent years, with an average tourism spend in the region per person of £4,081 in 2018.

=== Leisure and Sports facilities ===
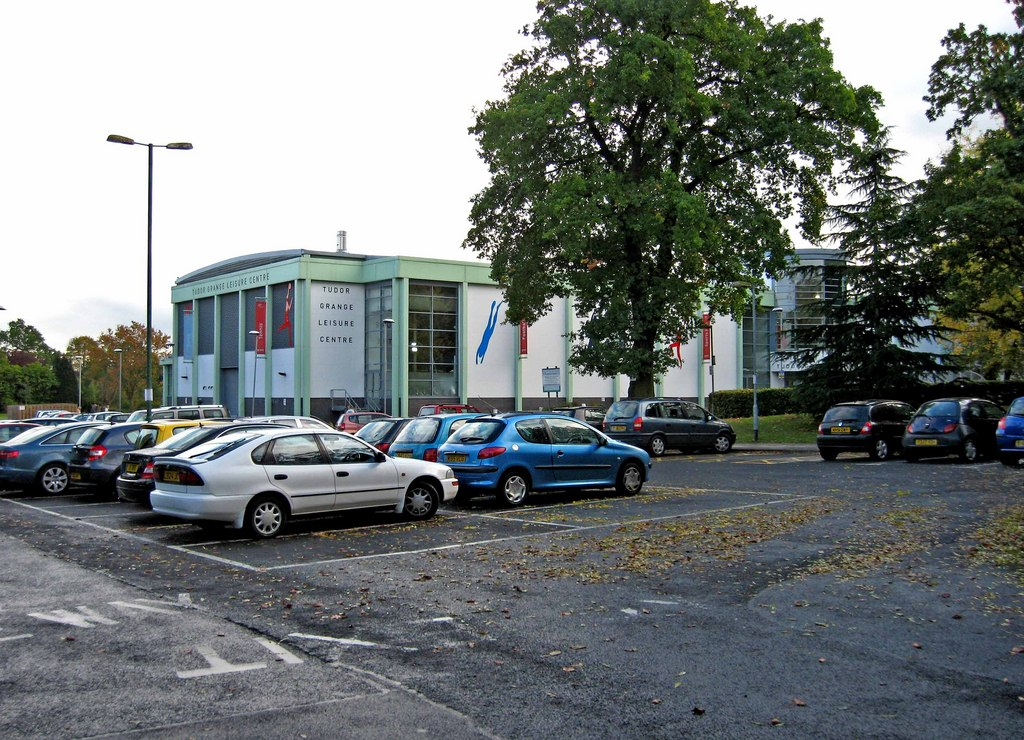
Tudor Grange Leisure Centre

Solihull has numerous leisure facilities. On the edge of Tudor Grange Park there is a sport centre and public swimming pool called Tudor Grange Leisure Centre. This pool replaced the old Tudor Grange Sports Centre, which was demolished in 2007, to make way for the brand new leisure centre (a combination of the old Norman Green Athletics Centre and Tudor Grange Sports Centre). This in turn had replaced the outdoor swimming pool – Malvern Park Lido – that had served Solihull from 1954 till its closure in 1982.

Adjacent to the leisure centre is the Norman Green Athletics Track. The track here was originally opened in 1959 was built of clay and required the rerouting of the Alder Brook stream in Tudor Grange Park, but was upgraded to a full synthetic track in 1985. The upgraded track was named for Councillor Norman Green, Solihull's Deputy Mayor in the late 1970s and in charge of the Appeal fund for the synthetic track. The track is used by the Solihull and Small Heath Athletics Club.

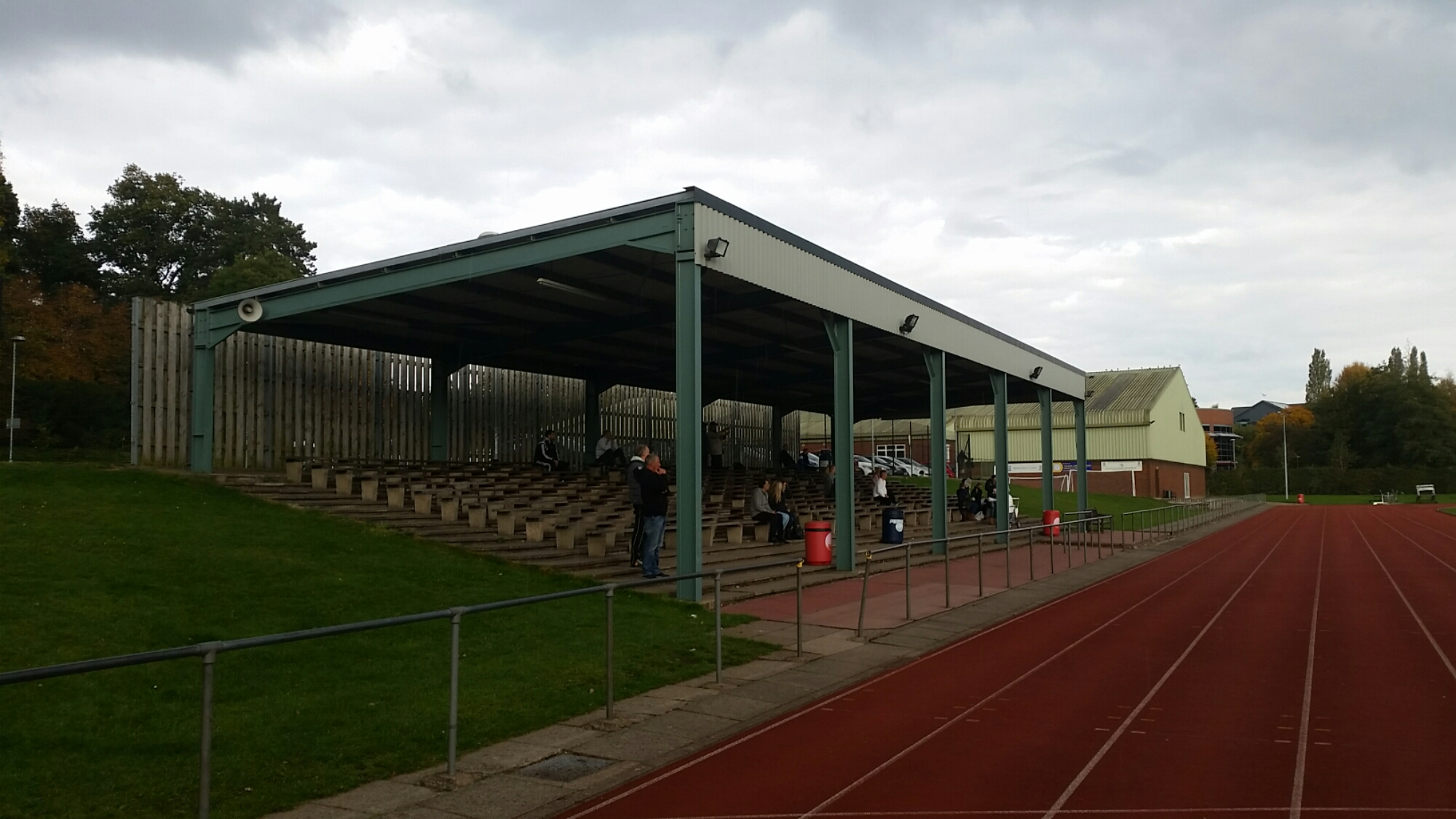
Norman Green Athletics Track

At the centre of the Norman Green Athletics Track is the Norman Green Sports Stadium, an association football pitch used by local amateur association football clubs.

Tudor Grange park also has an 18 hole pitch and putt.

There is also an outdoor wooden skateboarding and in-line skating facility in Tudor Grange Park.

=== Entertainment and activity facilities ===
On the outskirts of Solihull is the Bear Grylls Adventure Park, run by Merlin Entertainments and named after British adventurer Bear Grylls. The centre offers rock climbing, indoor skydiving, a zip line from a Chinook helicopter, Europe's tallest high ropes, an assault course and a chance to dive with sharks. The adventure park closed in December 2024.

At the Solihull Land Rover plant is the Land Rover Experience which features a "14 miles of varied terrain on the legendary Jungle Track, Land Track and Adventure Zone" and driving experiences can be booked.

In woodland on Cut-Throat-Lane in Hockley Heath is the largest paintball centre in the Midlands.

=== Clubs and societies ===
The borough is well served by numerous youth groups, both from the statutory and voluntary sector. There are several Scout groups including Knowle Sea Scout Group which is based in the south of Solihull and is sponsored by the Royal Navy providing a wide programme of activities for young people from all over Solihull aged from 6 to 18. The recently refurbished ice rink on Hobs Moat Road is home to Solihull's ice hockey teams, the Solihull Barons, Solihull Vikings, a junior ice hockey team, the Mohawks ice racing club, as well as ice dance and figure skating clubs. Above the ice rink was a Riley's snooker club before the company entered administration in 2020 as a result of the COVID-19 pandemic.

A number of service organisations and other clubs operate in Solihull including a Rotary Club, Round Table, Lions Club, a Royal British Legion, and a Women's Institute founded over 90 years ago. There is a Freemasonic temple in Knowle hosting a number of lodges.

The Lunar Society of Birmingham, a local learned society re-founded by Dame Rachel Waterhouse, is headquartered in Shirley, Solihull.

=== Events ===
Every year since the early 1930s (apart from gaps during world wars, and in 2020 due to COVID-19), Solihull Carnival has taken place. This is now fixed to the first weekend after the June half-term and takes place in Tudor Grange Park, organised by Shirley Round Table.

Tudor Grange Park is also the venue for the annual free firework display held on the Saturday closest to 5 November, organised by Solihull Round Table. The event attracts about 15,000 people to the park.

In recent years, the town has held Solihull Summer Festival which also takes place in Tudor Grange Park, the festival completed its 7th year in 2023 and is now looking to be a regular addition to the town's summer calendar.

Every year, the town plays host to the Crufts international dog show and Horse of the Year Show (HOYS) at its National Exhibition Centre.

The council hosts a popular farmers market every first Friday of the month on the High Street to cater to the increased demand for organic and locally grown food.

The town hosts an annual CAMRA beer festival.

Every year, a large unofficial St George's Day Parade takes place, meeting in Solihull, traveling down through neighbouring Henley-in-Arden and into Stratford-upon-Avon.

== Sport ==
=== Association football ===
The largest football club in the town is Solihull Moors, who play at Damson Park, 2 miles (3.2 km) from the town centre. The club was established in 2007 following the merger of Solihull Borough and Moor Green and currently play in the National League after being promoted from the National League North at the end of the 2015–16 season.

After the demolition of the Old Wembley Stadium a bid was made for a new multi-purpose English National Stadium to be built in the north of the borough of Solihull as a new home for English football. The bid was ultimately unsuccessful.

=== Rugby football ===
Birmingham & Solihull R.F.C., known as "the Bees", compete in Midlands 4 West (South) league as of 2020–21. The club had a brief period in the RFU Championship (the second tier of English Rugby) in 2010. The club played at a ground in the Solihull town centre at Sharmans Cross Road until August 2010 when they were relegated from the Championship. Following a brief spell at Solihull Moors' Damson Park ground, the club now play at Portway. Other amateur clubs play in the borough at various levels.

Former England Captain and World Cup winner Martin Johnson is from Solihull.

Former Premiership side Wasps who entered administration and were relegated in 2022 will share Damson Park with Solihull Moors for their return to competitive rugby in the RFU Championship in 2023.

=== Cricket ===
There are several local level cricket clubs across Solihull, including Hampton and Solihull Cricket Club and Solihull Municipal Cricket Club, both of whom compete in the Warwickshire Cricket League and Arden Sunday Cricket League. The Scorers, on Streetsbrook Road is the home of Moseley Cricket Club, who played their first recorded match on the ground in 1956. As ECB National Club Cricket Championship winners of 1980, Moseley have achieved numerous championship titles over the years in the Birmingham and District Premier League.

=== Other sports ===
Solihull Riding Club is the longest established riding club in the UK. It has one of the largest indoor riding arenas in the country and a premier competition centre. Solihull is also home to multiple riding schools within its borough, such as Cottage Farm Stables in Illshaw Heath.

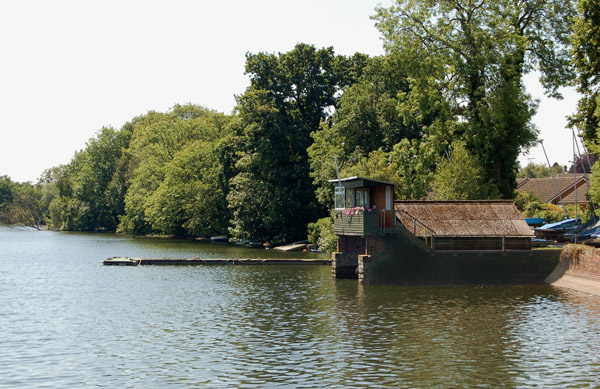
Olton Mere Sailing Club

Solihull borough is home to two sailing clubs. The Earlswood Lakes Sailing Club founded in 1960 meet at Windmill Lake amongst the Earlswood Lakes. The Olton Mere Sailing Club founded in 1926 meet at Olton Reservoir.

Tennis is a popular sport in Solihull with courts available to the public in Malvern Park. The Solihull Arden Racquets Club is a thriving racquets and fitness club in Solihull. Former UK tennis number one Jeremy Bates grew up in Solihull and attended Tudor Grange school.

Solihull has a number of golf clubs and facilities, including Shirley Golf Club, Olton Golf Club, Copt Heath Golf Club, Robin Hood Golf Club, West Midlands Golf Club, Widney Manor Golf Club, Tidbury Green Golf Club, the Arden Course at the Forest of Arden Marriott Hotel & Country Club, an 18-hole pitch and putt at Tudor Grange Park, and a driving range at Four Ashes. Arden Golf Club, Solihull, (now defunct) was founded in 1891. The course was still appearing on maps into the 1930s.

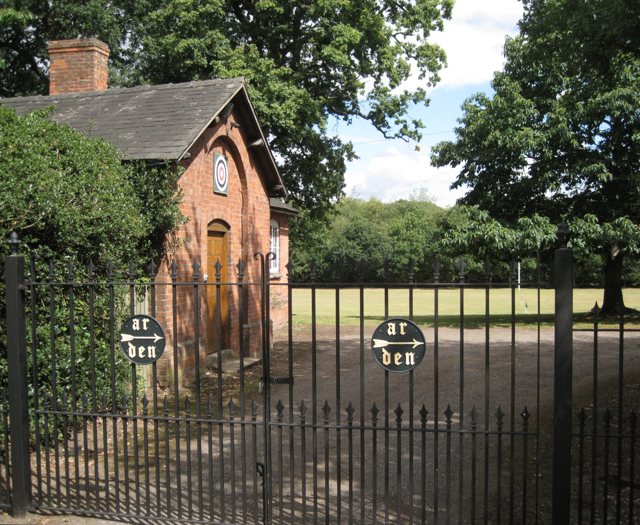
The Gates to Forest Hall, home of the Woodmen of Arden

Archery has always been a prominent sport in Solihull. The Meriden Archery Club, founded in 1936, meet within the grounds of the Packington Estate and practice target archery. The Forest of Arden Bowmen practice field archery in grounds nearby. Meriden is also home to the Woodmen of the Forest of Arden founded 1785, a society of archers who shoot a unique and historic type of clout archery with longbows.

Solihull is also home to Solihull Cycling Club which was founded in 1929. The club has produced National Champions, Olympic Medallists and Tour de France riders Meriden is home to the National Cyclists Memorial, dedicated to the cyclists who died in the First World War. National cycling organisations commemorate these deaths with an annual mid-May service on the green.

Solihull Swimming Club is based at Tudor Grange Leisure Centre. First established in 1963, the club now boasts over 600 members and also runs water polo teams.

Solihull Barons are the local ice hockey team and play their home games at the Solihull Ice Rink. Solihull also has a number of field hockey clubs, namely Old Silhillians Hockey Club, Olton & West Warwickshire Hockey Club and Solihull Blossomfield Hockey Club.

Gaelic games are played by Warwickshire GAA who play their home matches in Páirc na hÉireann in Solihull.

The town has an indoor bowling area and club.

== Twin towns ==
Solihull is twinned with Changzhou in China, Cholet in France and Main-Taunus-Kreis in Germany.

== Notable people ==
This list includes notable persons who were born or have lived in Solihull and its borough.

See Category:People from Solihull

- Cecil Aldin (b.1870), illustrator and artist, educated in Solihull
- W. H. Auden (b. 1907), Anglo-American poet, lived on Homer Road in Solihull
- Jeremy Bates (b. 1962), former UK tennis number 1, born in Solihull
- Sir David Baulcombe (b. 1952), Professor of Botany at the University of Cambridge, born in Solihull
- Mark Billingham (b. 1961), novelist, actor and screenwriter, born in Solihull
- Sir Alfred Bird, 1st Baronet of Solihull in the County of Warwick (b. 1849), chairman of Bird's Custard, lived in Solihull
- Elizabeth Bower (b. 1976), actress, Doctors, brought up in Solihull
- Karren Brady (b. 1969), vice-chairman of West Ham United, lived in Copt Heath, Solihull
- Jeremy Brett (b. 1933), British actor, famed for playing Sherlock Holmes and Freddy Eynsford-Hill in My Fair Lady, born in Berkswell, Solihull
- David Briggs (b.1962), English organist and composer, educated in Solihull
- Michael Buerk (b. 1946), BBC News reader, born and brought up in Solihull, attending Solihull School
- Mike Bullen, (b.1960), screenwriter, brought up and educated in Solihull
- Lorely Burt, Baroness Burt of Solihull (b. 1954), British politician, lived in Solihull
- John A. Butt (b. 1960), conductor, scholar, keyboardist and Gardiner Chair at the University of Glasgow, brought up in Solihull
- Daniel Caines (b. 1979), athlete, born in Solihull
- Karen Carney (b. 1987), Birmingham, England and Great Britain women's footballer, born in Solihull
- Stephanie Cole (b. 1941), actress, born in Solihull
- Dominic Coleman (b. 1970), actor, born in Solihull
- Alan Cox (b. 1968), a Linux kernel engineer, born in Solihull
- Matthew Croucher (b. 1983), Royal Marine George Cross holder, born in Solihull
- Jon "Fox" Davies (b. 1988), Professional rugby player for the Scarlets, Wales and the British and Irish Lions, born in Solihull
- Gary Delaney (b. 1973), comedian, born in Solihull
- Gwendoline Delbos-Corfield (b. 1977), French politician, born in Solihull
- Nick Drake (b. 1948), musician/poet, brought up in Tanworth-in-Arden, in Solihull
- Christopher Edmunds, composer, lived at 19, Blythe Way Solihull, 1950s–1970s.
- Dan Evans (b. 1990), top ranked British tennis player from October 2019 onwards, lived in Solihull
- Susan Fletcher (b. 1979), novelist. Winner of Whitbread Prize (now Costa Book Award) and Betty Trask Award, brought up in Solihull
- Craig Gardner (b. 1986), Birmingham City midfielder, born in Solihull
- Shane Geraghty (b. 1986), England rugby union player, attended St Alphege Junior School, Solihull
- Joseph Gillott (b. 1799), founder of Joseph Gillott Pens, lived in Solihull
- Tommy Godwin (b. 1920), cyclist, twice Olympic medallist in 1948 and President of Solihull Cycling Club
- Don Gould and Gerry Freeman, members of the Applejacks, born in Solihull
- Mark Goldbridge (b. 1979), English YouTuber and radio presenter
- Jack Grealish (b. 1995), professional footballer, plays for Manchester City and the England national team, brought up in Solihull
- Will Grigg (b. 1991), English-born Northern Irish professional footballer, attended Solihull School
- Amii Grove (b. 1985), glamour model, born in Solihull
- Richard Hammond (b. 1969), television presenter (Top Gear, The Grand Tour etc.), born in Solihull and attended Solihull School
- John Hampson (b.1901), novelist, lived in Dorridge, Solihull
- Air Vice Marshal Peter John Harding (b. 1940), senior RAF officer and Defence Services Secretary, educated in Solihull
- Richard Harrison, scientist, born in Solihull
- Dave Hill (b. 1946), Slade's guitarist, lived in Solihull
- Rupert Hill (b. 1978), Jamie Baldwin in Coronation Street, born and brought up in Solihull
- Edith Holden (b. 1871), British artist, taught in Solihull
- Suzanne Innes-Stubb (b. 1970), British-Finnish attorney, the wife of Finnish President Alexander Stubb, and First Lady of Finland; born in Solihull
- Tony Iommi (b. 1948), lead guitarist of Black Sabbath, lives in Solihull
- Richard Jago (b. 1715), poet and landscape gardener, educated in Solihull
- David Jennens (b. 1929), Olympic and Cambridge University rower, born in Solihull
- Martin Johnson (b. 1970), England rugby union player and captain, born in Shirley, Solihull
- Felicity Kendal (b. 1946), actress and TV star, born in Olton, Solihull
- Nigel Kennedy (b. 1956), violinist, brought up in Solihull
- Justin King (b. 1961), former CEO of J Sainsbury plc, educated in Solihull
- Zat Knight (b. 1980), professional footballer, mainly with Fulham, Aston Villa and Bolton Wanderers, born in Solihull
- Stewart Lee (b. 1968), stand-up comedian, attended Solihull School
- Russell Leetch (b. 1982), bass guitarist for Editors, educated in Solihull
- Lady Leshurr (b.1987), British rapper, singer, songwriter and producer, born in Kingshurst in Solihull
- George Lloyd, 1st Baron Lloyd (b.1879), former Leader of the House of Lords and Secretary of State for the Colonies, born in Olton in Solihull
- Caroline Redman Lusher (b. 1974), singer/songwriter, founder and director of Rock Choir, educated in Solihull
- Don Maclean (b. 1944), 1970s host of Crackerjack, comedian, broadcaster and personality, lived in Solihull
- Clare Maguire (b. 1988), singer-songwriter, born in Solihull
- Nigel Mansell (b.1953), former British racing driver and Formula 1 Champion, attended Solihull College
- Tony Martin (b. 1957), singer, songwriter, lead singer of Black Sabbath, lived in Solihull
- Simon Mayo (b. 1958), broadcaster, attended Solihull School
- James McFadden (b. 1983), Birmingham City midfielder/striker, lived in Solihull
- Tom McKay (b. 1979), actor, born in Solihull
- Carol McNicoll (b. 1943), designer and potter, brought up in Solihull
- Robert Mutchell (b. 1974), former footballer, born in Solihull
- Lizo Mzimba (b.1968), journalist and television presenter, born and educated in Solihull
- Ritchie Neville (b. 1979), member of the band Five, educated in Solihull
- Jonathan Nott (b. 1962), conductor, born in Solihull
- Callum O'Hare (b. 1998), footballer, born in Solihull
- Sir Frederick Peel, 3rd Baronet Peel of Drayton Manor and Bury (b. 1823), politician, lived in Solihull
- Sir Robert Peel, 2nd Baronet Peel of Drayton Manor and Bury (b. 1788) former British Prime Minister, founded modern English police force, Lord of the Manor in Hampton-in-Arden in Solihull
- Genesis P-Orridge (Neil Megson) (b.1950), musician, poet, performance artist, and occultist, studied at Solihull School
- Graham Potter (b. 1975), former professional footballer and current Sweden National Team head coach was born in Solihull
- Margaret Preece, opera singer, born in Solihull
- Jim Proudfoot (b. 1972), TalkSport football commentator, educated in Solihull
- Will Radburn (b. 1991), rugby union footballer
- Laurence Rees (b. 1957), historian and documentary filmmaker, attended Solihull School
- Mandy Rice-Davies (b. 1944), famed for her role in the Profumo affair, attended Sharmans Cross Junior School in Solihull
- Guy Russell (b.1967), footballer and football club manager, brought up in and around Solihull
- William Shenstone (b. 1714), poet, educated in Solihull
- Marc Silk (b. 1972), voice actor, born in Solihull
- Robert Short (b.1783), East India Company officer, lived and educated in Solihull
- Malcolm Stent (b. 1945), playwright and entertainer, lived in Solihull
- Pamela Helen Stephen (b. 1964), British mezzo-soprano, born in Solihull
- Andy Street (b. 1963), first and former Mayor of the West Midlands, lived in Beechwood Park Road as a child
- Nikki Sudden (b.1956), singer songwriter, educated in Solihull
- Nigel John Taylor (b. 1960), bass guitarist in new wave band Duran Duran, born in Solihull
- David Thomas (b.1959), former Surrey County Cricket Club player, born in Solihull
- Andy Townsend (b. 1963), broadcaster and TV pundit, and former Aston Villa, Chelsea and Ireland footballer, lives in Solihull
- Johnnie Walker (b.1945), broadcaster, radio host and DJ, educated in Solihull
- Stephen Walters (b. 1973), actor, lives in Solihull
- Sally Walton (b. 1981), GB Women's Hockey player and 2012 Summer Olympics bronze medalist, lived in Solihull
- William Wilberforce (b. 1759), Abolitionist, lived in Elmdon in Solihull
- John Wyndham (b. 1903), science fiction author born in Dorridge in Solihull
- Dorian Yates (b. 1962), IFBB professional bodybuilder and 6 x Mr Olympia born in Solihull

== In popular culture ==
William Camden visited Solihull in 1558 and said of it in his work Britannia: "I saw Solyhill; but in it, setting aside the church, there is nothing worth sight".

In David Turner's 1962 play Semi-Detached, Solihull is parodied as Dowlihull, a fictional town where the protagonist aspires to live.

In the British political TV series Yes Minister, in the S1E07 1980 episode "Jobs For The Boys" a public-private partnership project is called the "Solihull Project".

In Episode 2, Season 2 of the British comedy The Thin Blue Line, Detective Inspector Derek Grim (David Haig) suggests a Martian seeking asylum in the UK marry "a sweet girl from Solihull".

In Episode 6, Season 15 of the British motoring show Top Gear, presenters Jeremy Clarkson, James May and Richard Hammond travel to Solihull, the birthplace of Richard Hammond, where they test the "waterproof-ness" of their classic British sports cars in a carwash.

Episode 3, Series 2 of comedy series The Kevin Bishop Show features a sketch about a British remake of the award winning US television series Lost, in which a coach of well spoken people crash onto a traffic island in Solihull town centre.

The steam engine used as the Hogwarts Express in the Harry Potter film franchise was the GWR 4900 Class 5972 Olton Hall, named for the now demolished Olton Hall estate in Olton, Solihull.

In the S6E05 episode of television series Peaky Blinders, the main character Tommy Shelby meets aristocrat Diana Mitford, who is staying at a hotel in Solihull, to secure funding from The Guinness Trust – managed by her ex-husband.

== See also ==
- List of public art in Solihull
- List of towns in England
- History of Warwickshire
