= Kings Norton Junction =

Kings Norton Canal Junction

Coordinates: 52°24′44″N 1°55′22″W

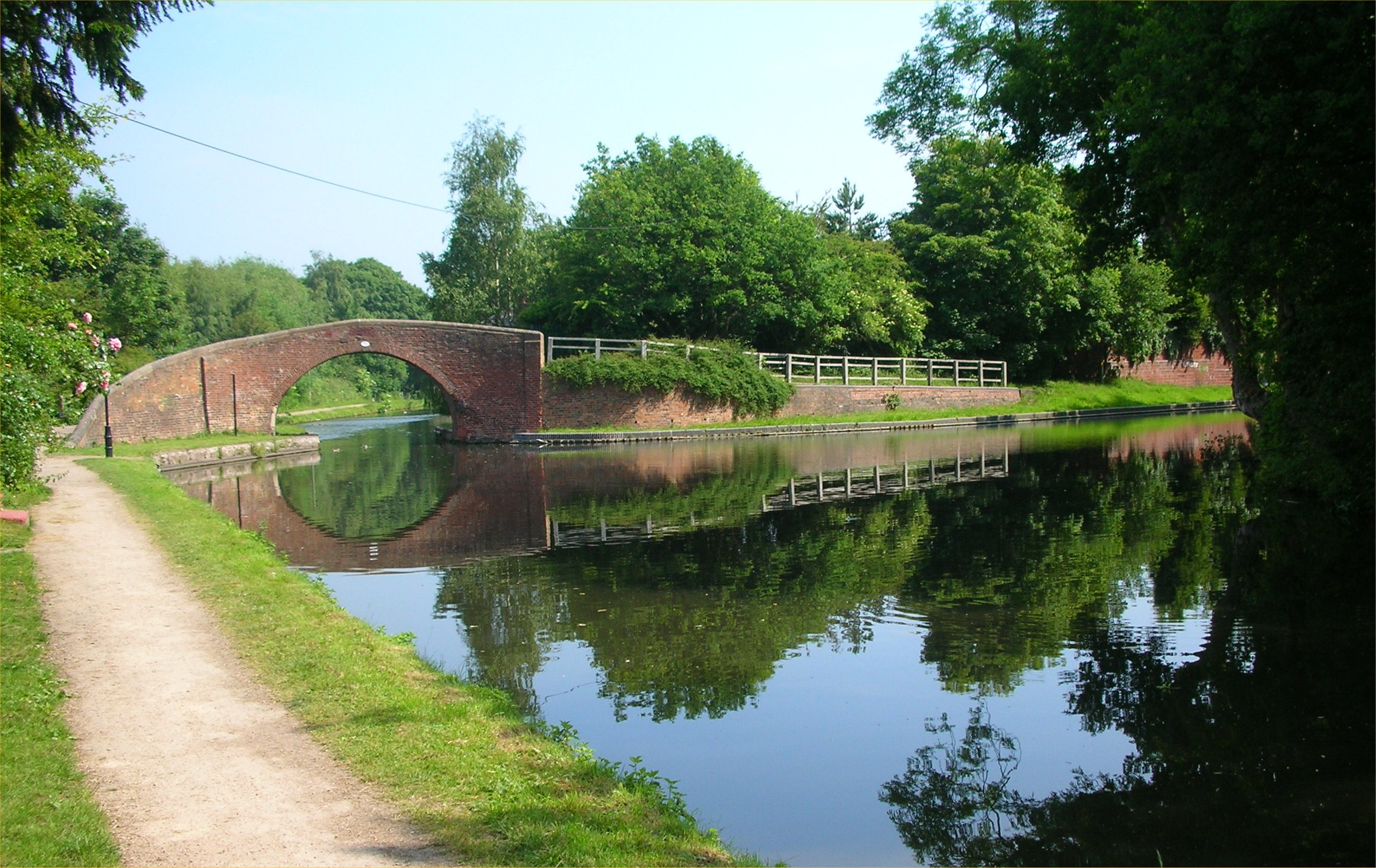
- The roving bridge crosses the Worcester and Birmingham Canal, while the Stratford-upon-Avon Canal starts at the top right.
- Interactive map of Kings Norton Junction

Specifications
- Status: Open
- Navigation authority: British Waterways

History
- Date completed: 1807

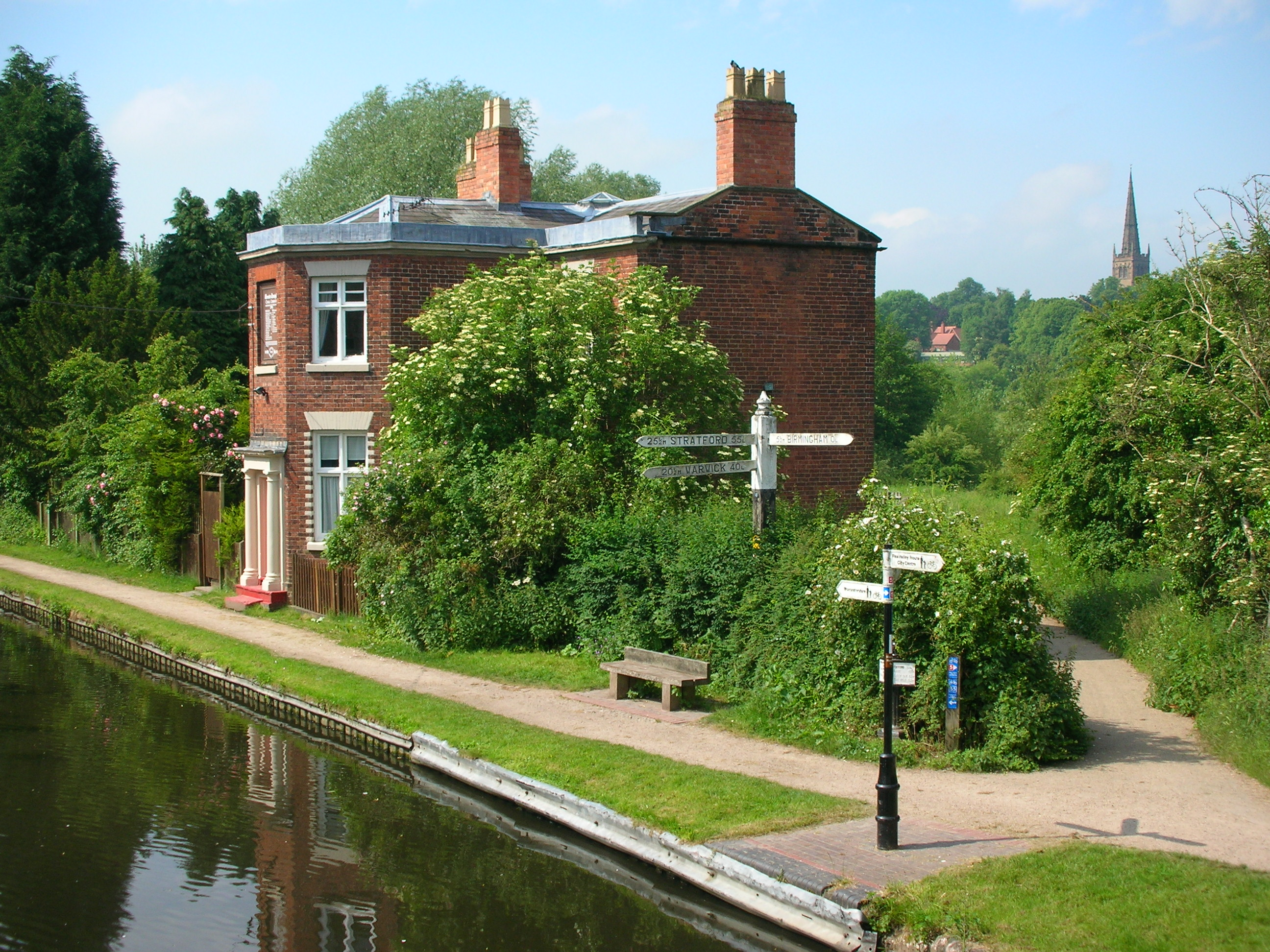
Kings Norton Junction toll house on the Worcester and Birmingham Canal

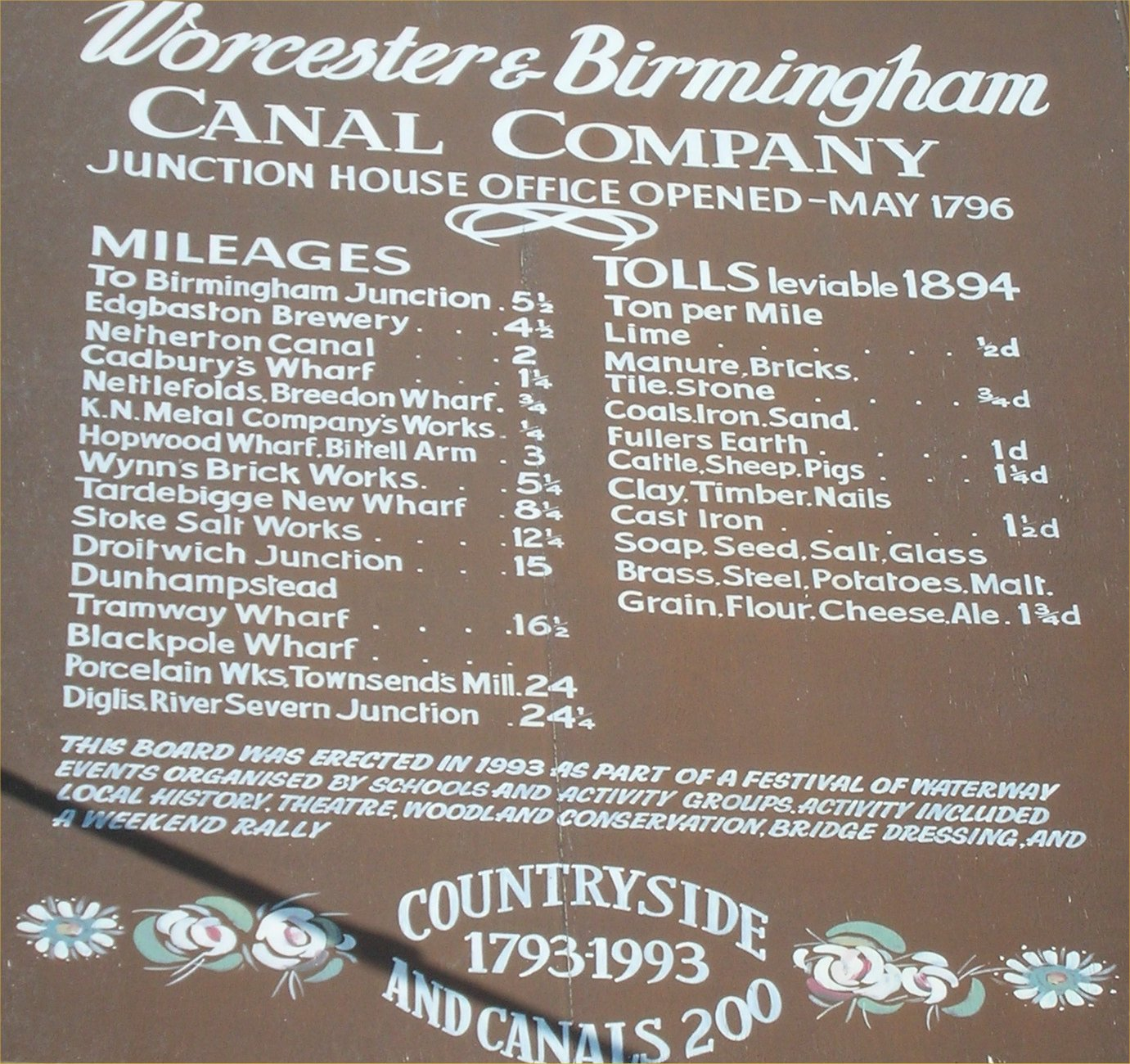
Modern reproduction of the scale of toll fees, displayed on the wall of the toll house

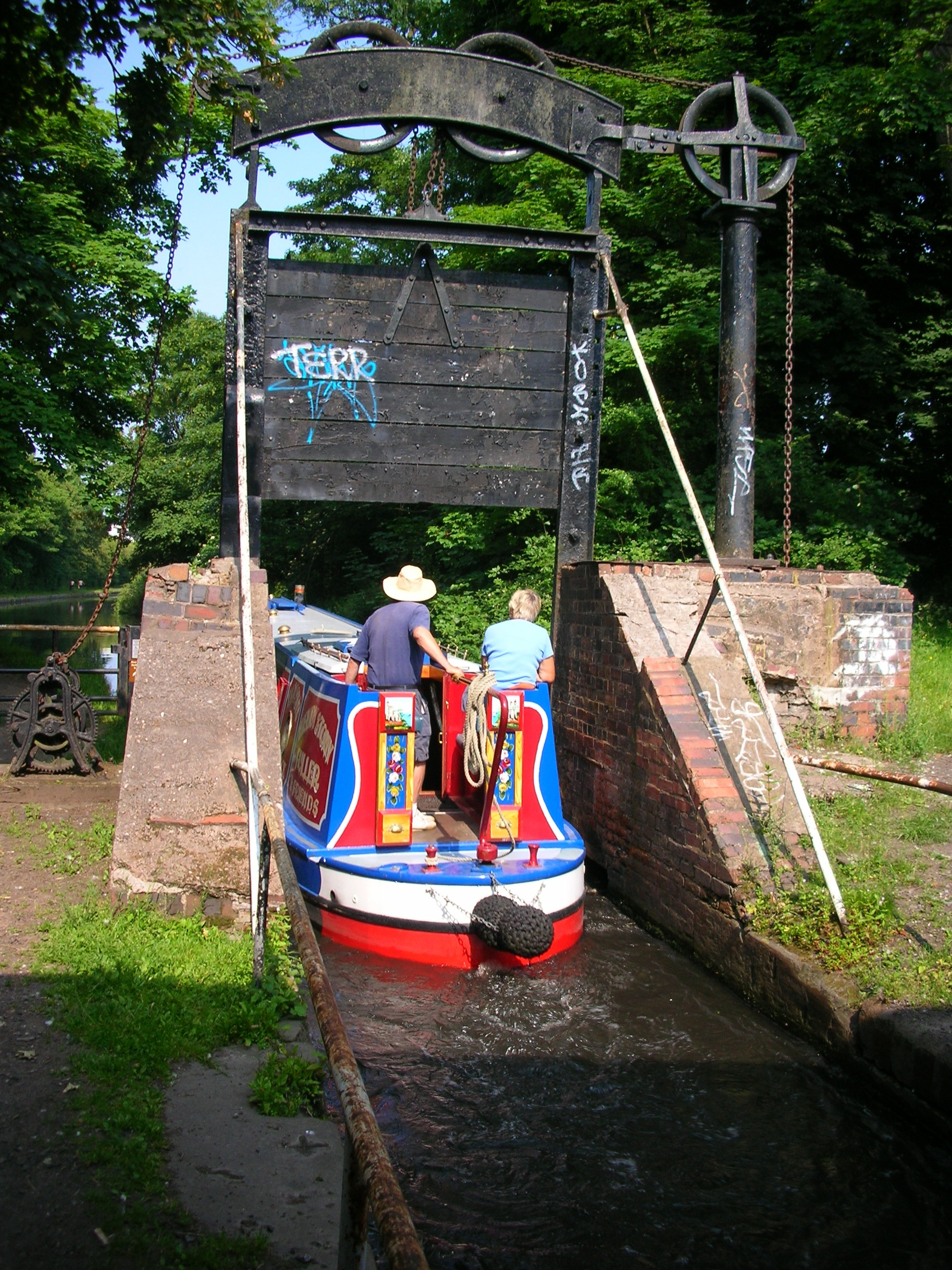
Lifford Lane guillotine stop lock, 200 m. along the Stratford Canal

Kings Norton Junction (grid reference SP052794) is the name of the canal junction where the Stratford-upon-Avon Canal terminates and meets the Worcester and Birmingham Canal at Kings Norton, Birmingham, England.

== History ==
The Worcester and Birmingham Canal was authorised by the Worcester and Birmingham Canal Act 1791 (31 Geo. 3. c. 59), after overcoming opposition by the Staffordshire and Worcestershire Canal and the Birmingham Canal Company. The first saw the new route as direct competition, while the second would not allow a junction between the two canals. The canal was built southwards from Birmingham, where there was a 7-foot (2.1 m) gap between the canal and the Birmingham system. Shortly after passing through King's Norton, a ridge of hills was pierced by the 2,726-yard (2,493 m) Wast Hill Tunnel. Construction of it began in 1794, and by 1807, boats could reach Tardebigge. There was then a period of no activity, but the canal was finally completed to Diglis Basin and the River Severn in 1815. An agreement enabled a stop lock to be built to connect the canal to the Birmingham Canals in the same year.

The Stratford-upon-Avon Canal was authorised in 1793, to ensure that the prosperity being generated by new canal routes would not bypass Stratford. Construction began at Kings Norton Junction, less than 3 miles (4.8 km) from Selly Oak Junction, where the Worcester and Birmingham met with the Dudley Canal No. 2 line which passed through the Lapal Tunnel. This route would give easy access to the Dudley coalfields. After the first three years, progress was slow due to a lack of capital, and it was not until the canal reached Kingswood Junction at Lapworth in 1803, where there was a link to the Warwick and Birmingham Canal (later part of the Grand Union Canal), that large volumes of traffic used the canal and Kings Norton Junction. The final section from Lapworth to Stratford was built between 1812 and 1815.

Although the southern section of the Stratford-upon-Avon Canal was closed, the northern section did not officially do so, although there was little traffic after 1939, and Lifford Bridge, shortly after the stop lock, could no longer be swung after 1942, when the Great Western Railway repaired it in a way which prevented its movement. It was the scene of one of the first campaigns by the fledgling Inland Waterways Association, when Tom Rolt announced in 1947 that he intended to navigate through the junction and along the canal. The Railway company had to jack the bridge up, to allow his boat to pass, and the event was widely reported in newspapers, gaining useful publicity.

== Location ==
High on the wall of the Worcester and Birmingham toll house is a 1993 reproduction of the scale of toll fees in 1793. Fees varied from ½d per ton per mile for lime, to 1 ^{3}/_{4}d for food or finished products.

The water of the two canal companies was kept apart by the nearby Lifford Lane guillotine stop lock, consisting of two wooden gates which moved vertically in iron frames. Now that both canals are managed by British Waterways, both gates are kept open, and have been since nationalisation of the canals in 1948. The structure is grade II* listed, as the raked cast iron frames, columns and counterweights are original.

At the junction is a grade II listed house, built in 1802 of red brick, with doric column decoration around the central doorway. It is somewhat larger than most lock-keepers cottages. The junction bridge, which has a broad elliptical arch and carries the towpath over the Worcester and Birmingham Canal to reach the Stratford-upon-Avon Canal, is located just to the north of the junction, and is also listed.

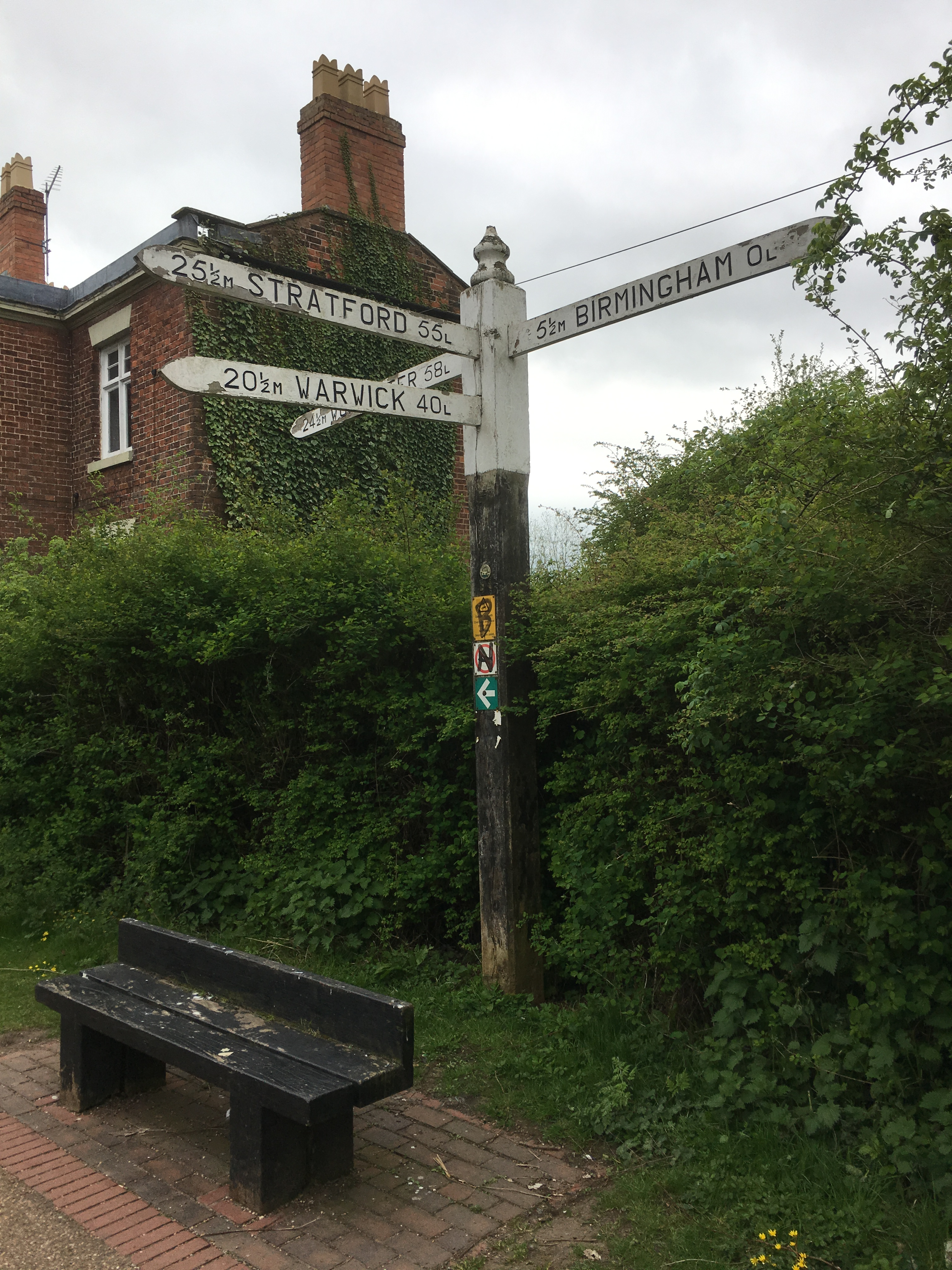
Kings Norton Junction finger post

From the junction, the Worcester and Birmingham Canal to the north is level to the junction with the Birmingham Canal Navigations at Worcester Bar Junction, 5.5 miles (8.9 km) away. To the south, it remains level for 8.6 miles (13.8 km) as it passes through Wast Hill, Shortwood and Tardebigge tunnels, until it arrives at the top lock of the thirty that form the Tardebigge flight. The Stratford-upon-Avon Canal initially heads towards the east, before turning to the south-east, and is level for 10.8 miles (17.4 km), after which 19 locks drop the canal down to Kingswood Junction and the Grand Union Canal.

== See also ==
- Canals of the United Kingdom
- History of the British canal system

== Bibliography ==
- Cumberlidge, Jane (2009). Inland Waterways of Great Britain (8th Ed.). Imray Laurie Norie and Wilson. ISBN 978-1-84623-010-3.
- Nicholson (2006). Nicholson Guide Vol 2 - Severn, Avon & Birmingham. Harper Collins. ISBN 0-00-721110-4.
- Pearson, Michael (1989). Canal Companion: Birmingham Canal Navigations. J. M. Pearson & Associates. ISBN 0-907864-49-X.
- Squires, Roger (2008). Britain's restored canals. Landmark Publishing. ISBN 978-1-84306-331-5.
- Ware, Michael E (1989). Britain's Lost Waterways. Moorland Publishing. ISBN 0-86190-327-7.
