= Lapworth =

Village and civil parish in Warwickshire, England

Coordinates: 52.338°N 1.762°W

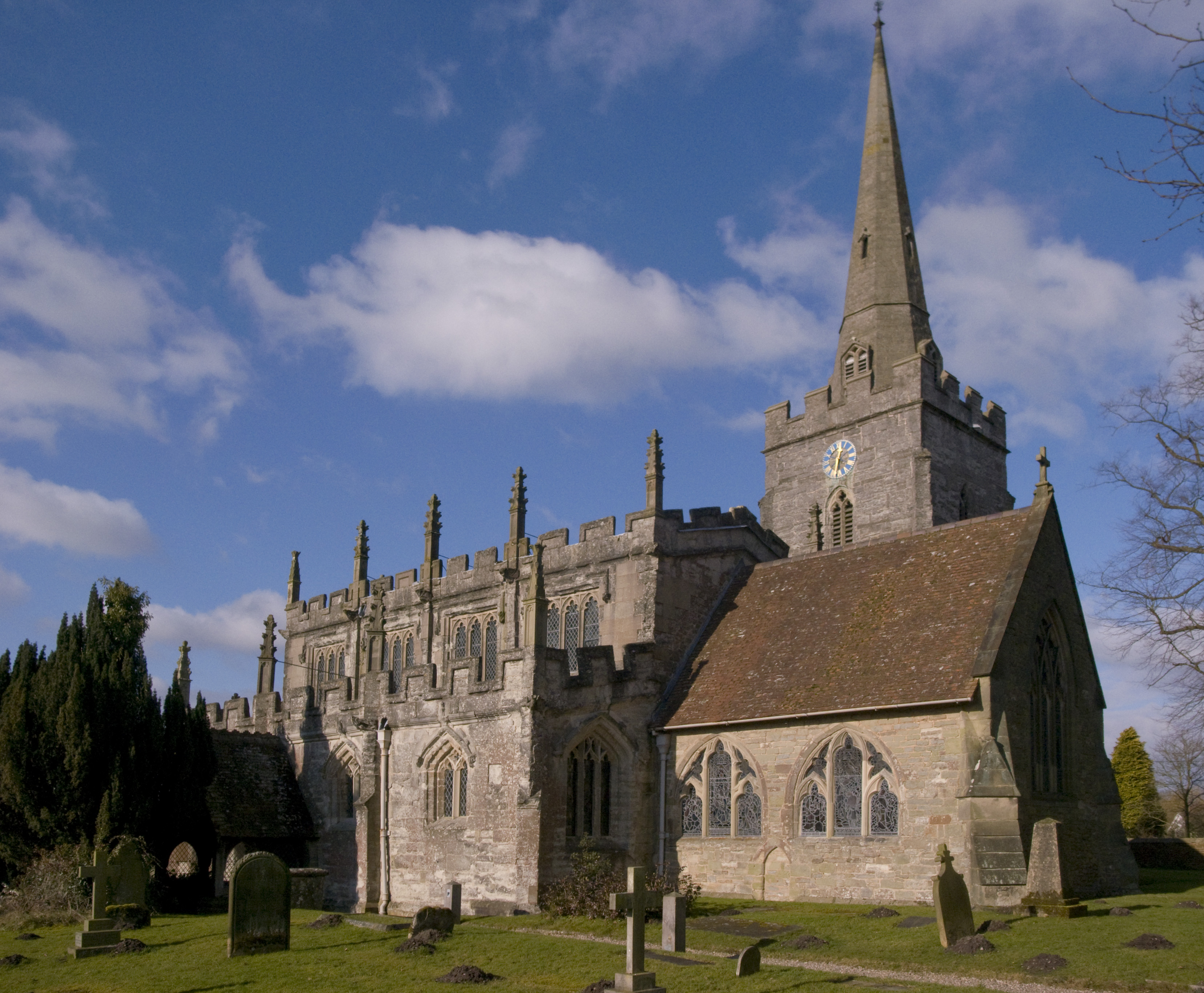
Lapworth church

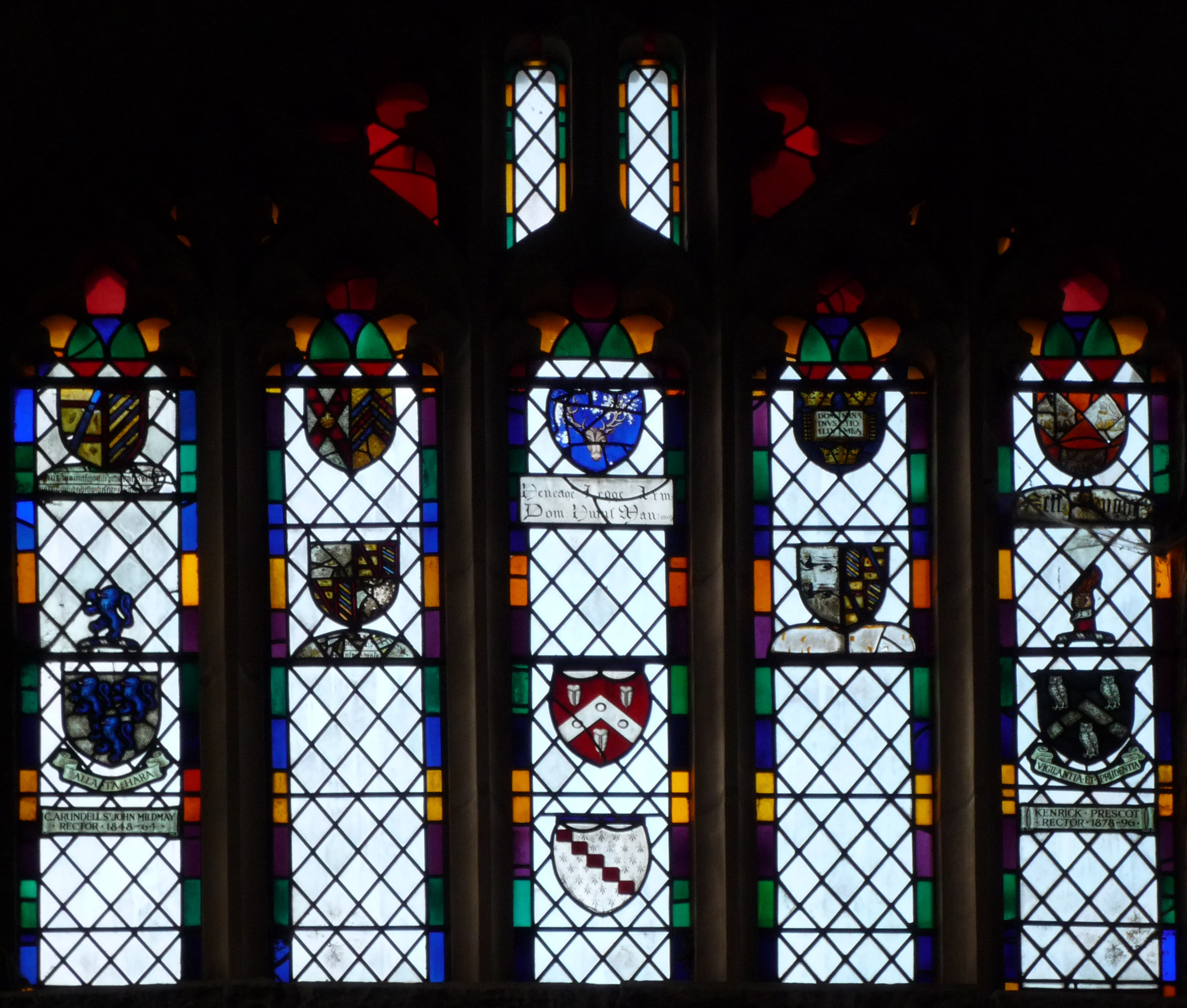
The armorial west window of the church

Lapworth is a village and civil parish in Warwickshire, England, which had a population of 1,916 at the 2021 census. It lies seven miles (11 km) south of Solihull and ten miles (16 km) northwest of Warwick, and incorporates the hamlet of Kingswood. Lapworth boasts a historic church, the Church of St Mary the Virgin, a chapel. Two National Trust sites are nearby: Baddesley Clinton, a medieval moated manor house and garden located in the village of Baddesley Clinton; and Packwood House, a Tudor manor house and yew garden with over 100 trees in Packwood.

The church is a building largely of the 13th and 14th centuries. It includes several unusual features: the steeple is connected by a passage to the north aisle and is built sheer with a projecting stair; the clerestory has square-headed windows; and there is a two-storey annex at the west end. In the church the Portland memorial to Florence Bradshaw was the work of Eric Gill and was installed in 1928. It is a Virgin and Child carved in low relief. The village is a popular area for cuisine, with three pubs: the Boot, the Navigation and the Punch Bowl.

The manor house of Sir John de Bishopsdon, built in 1313, was probably at Lapworth Hall, by 1572 known as Ireland's Farm, and from 1674 to the mid-19th century the home of the Mander family of Wolverhampton. The manor passed into the Catesby family on the marriage of Philippa, daughter of William de Bishopsdon, to Sir William Catesby in the 15th century. William was the great-grandfather of Robert Catesby, conspirator of the Gunpowder Plot in 1605, whose family were settled at Bushwood Hall, their chief Warwickshire seat, in the neighbouring parish of Bushwood. Catesby Lane in Lapworth is named after the family.

At Kingswood Junction, the Grand Union Canal joins the Stratford-upon-Avon Canal, which has a major flight of locks.

The furniture designer and maker Hugh Birkett worked from the late 1940s until 1966 in the garage at his parents' home in Lapworth. Examples of his work can be seen at Cheltenham Museum.

== Demographics ==
Census population of Lapworth parish
Census	Population	Female	Male	Households	Source
2001	1,737	877	860	732	
2011	1,828	909	919	784	
2021	1,916	963	953	815	

== Transport ==
Lapworth railway station is on the Chiltern line from London Marylebone to Moor Street. Originally called Kingswood, the station name was changed to Lapworth to avoid confusion with Kingswood railway station in Surrey. Junction 16 of the M40 motorway has only northbound entry and southbound exit to prevent traffic diverting through Hockley Heath as a shortcut to and from nearby junction 4 of the M42. The village is effectively a commuter village for professionals employed in Birmingham and Coventry, most of whom today drive to their places of work.

== Notable people ==
- Robert Edmiston, Baron Edmiston of Lapworth
- Robert Catesby, Gunpowder Plot conspirator
- Jonathan Darlington, conductor and music director of the Duisburg Philharmonic and Vancouver Opera
- Bob Davis a.k.a. Jasper Carrott
- Tony Iommi, guitarist and founding member of Black Sabbath, currently resides near the village
