= Kingswood Junction =

Canal junction in England, UK

Coordinates: 52.3352°N 1.7275°W

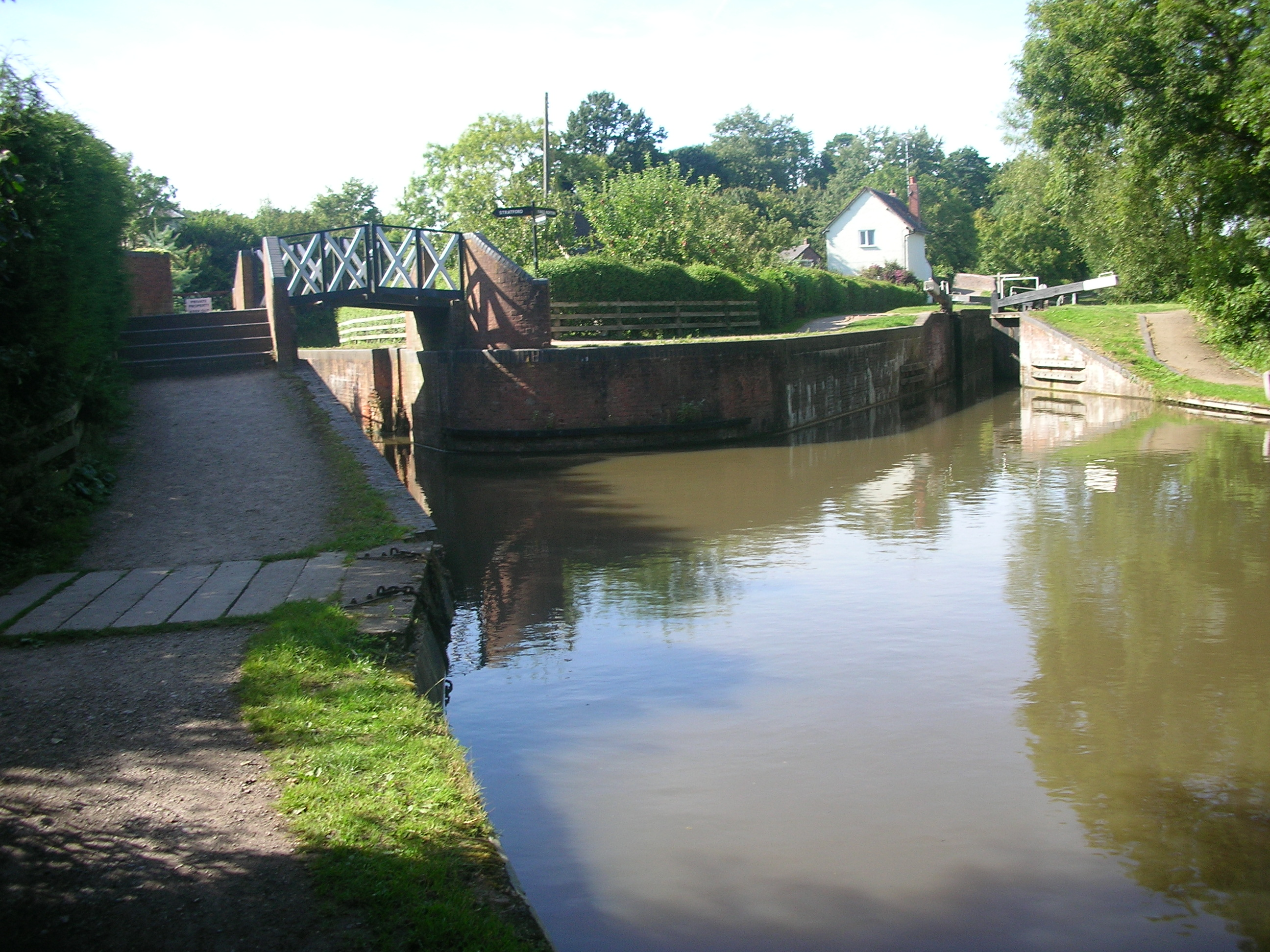
- Lock 20 (right), leading from the connecting arm to the Northern Stratford. To the left is the lockless arm leading to the bottom of lock 21.

Specifications
- Status: Open
- Navigation authority: British Waterways

History
- Date completed: 1803

Kingswood Junction (grid reference SP185709) is a canal junction where the Stratford-upon-Avon Canal meets the Grand Union Canal at Kingswood, Warwickshire, England.

== History ==
The Grand Union Canal was a late addition to the British canal system, being formed in 1929 by the amalgamation of a number of canal companies. This included the Warwick and Birmingham Canal, which was authorised in 1793 by an act of Parliament, in the same year that the Grand Junction Canal from Braunston to Brentford was authorised. The Warwick and Napton Canal, authorised in 1794, provided a link from the southern end of the canal to the Oxford Canal at Napton Junction, from which it was a short distance to Braunston and the route to London. The two Warwick canals opened officially on 19 December 1799, but were probably unfinished, as no trade occurred until the following March.

The Stratford-upon-Avon Canal was also authorised in 1793, as businessmen in the town wanted to ensure that the prosperity brought by the canals did not pass them by. The canal was to run from Kings Norton Junction, on the Worcester and Birmingham Canal, to Stratford, passing through Kingswood. The first part of the northern section to Hockley Heath was opened in 1796, but then the scheme foundered. It was not until 1800, when another act of Parliament was obtained, that further progress was made, and the canal opened as far at Kingswood, and the junction with the Warwick and Birmingham Canal in 1803. There was then another delay, with construction of the southern route below Kingswood not starting until 1812. The canal finally reached Stratford in 1815.

Although the junction was never officially closed, it was effectively closed in the 1940s. Parts of the southern section of the Stratford-upon-Avon Canal were dry, while there was little traffic on the northern section after 1939, which allowed the Great Western Railway to repair the Lifford swing bridge near Kings Norton Junction in 1942 in such a way that it could not be opened. The route from Kings Norton to Kingswood junctions was the scene of one of the first campaigns by the fledgling Inland Waterways Association, when Tom Rolt announced in 1947 that he intended to navigate along the canal. The railway company had to jack the bridge up, to allow his boat to pass, and the event was widely reported in newspapers, gaining useful publicity. The route from the junction to Stratford was reopened in 1964 by Queen Elizabeth The Queen Mother, having been taken over and restored by the National Trust.

== Location ==
The junction consists of a 250-metre linking arm with two branches at the (western) Stratford Canal end and a simple junction with the Grand Union at the eastern end. One of the branches descends through a lock to the connecting arm. The other branch is taken from the Stratford canal below another lock.

The Stratford Canal (the Northern Stratford Canal) heads, via a flight of locks, towards the Worcester and Birmingham Canal at Kings Norton Junction. South of Kingswood Junction the Southern Stratford Canal descends through locks to the River Avon at Stratford-upon-Avon. The Grand Union leads north to Knowle Locks, and then Birmingham, and leads south to Hatton Locks and Warwick.

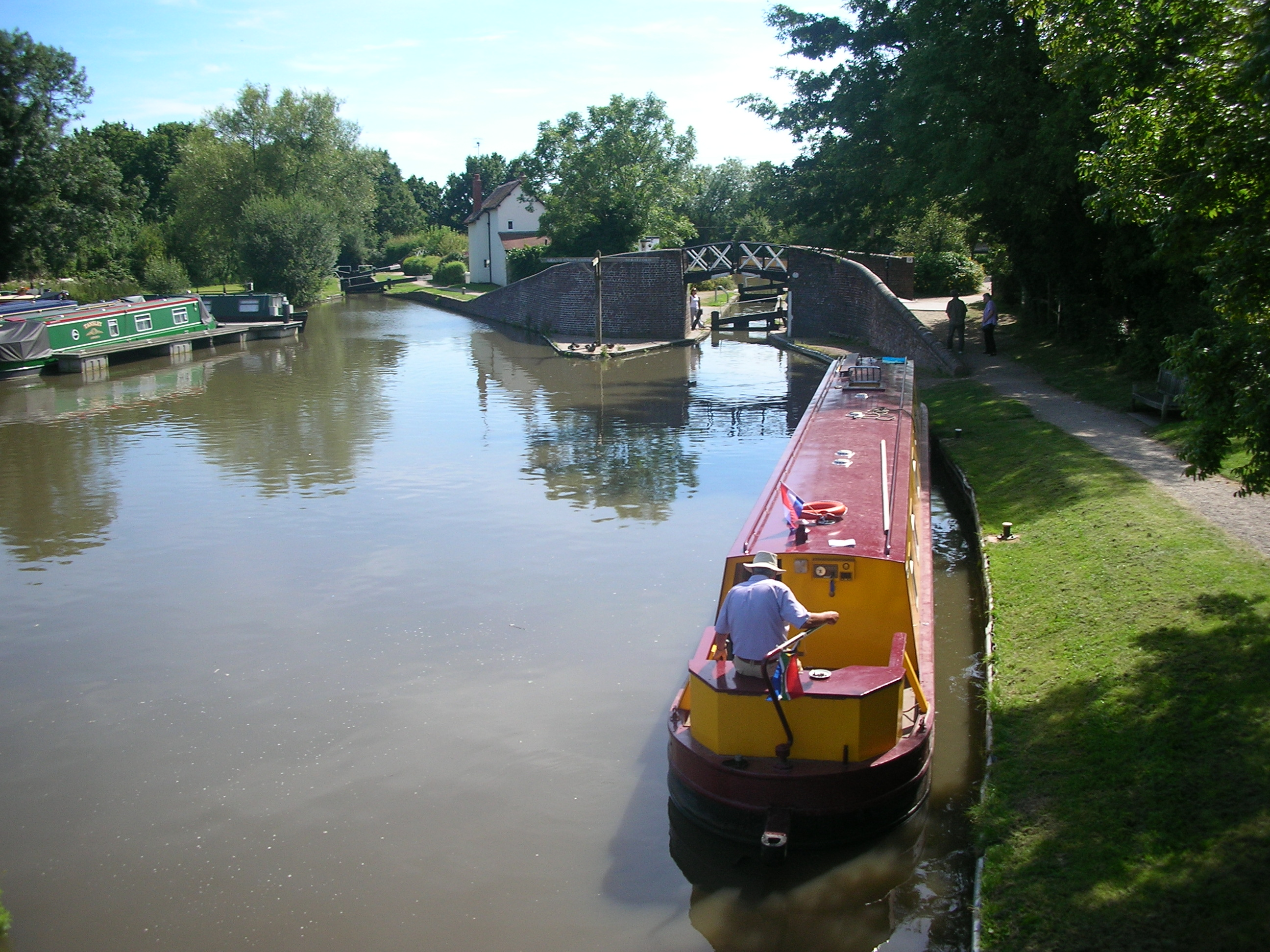
Lock 20 (left), leading to the Grand Union connecting arm. Lock 21 (right), leading to Stratford

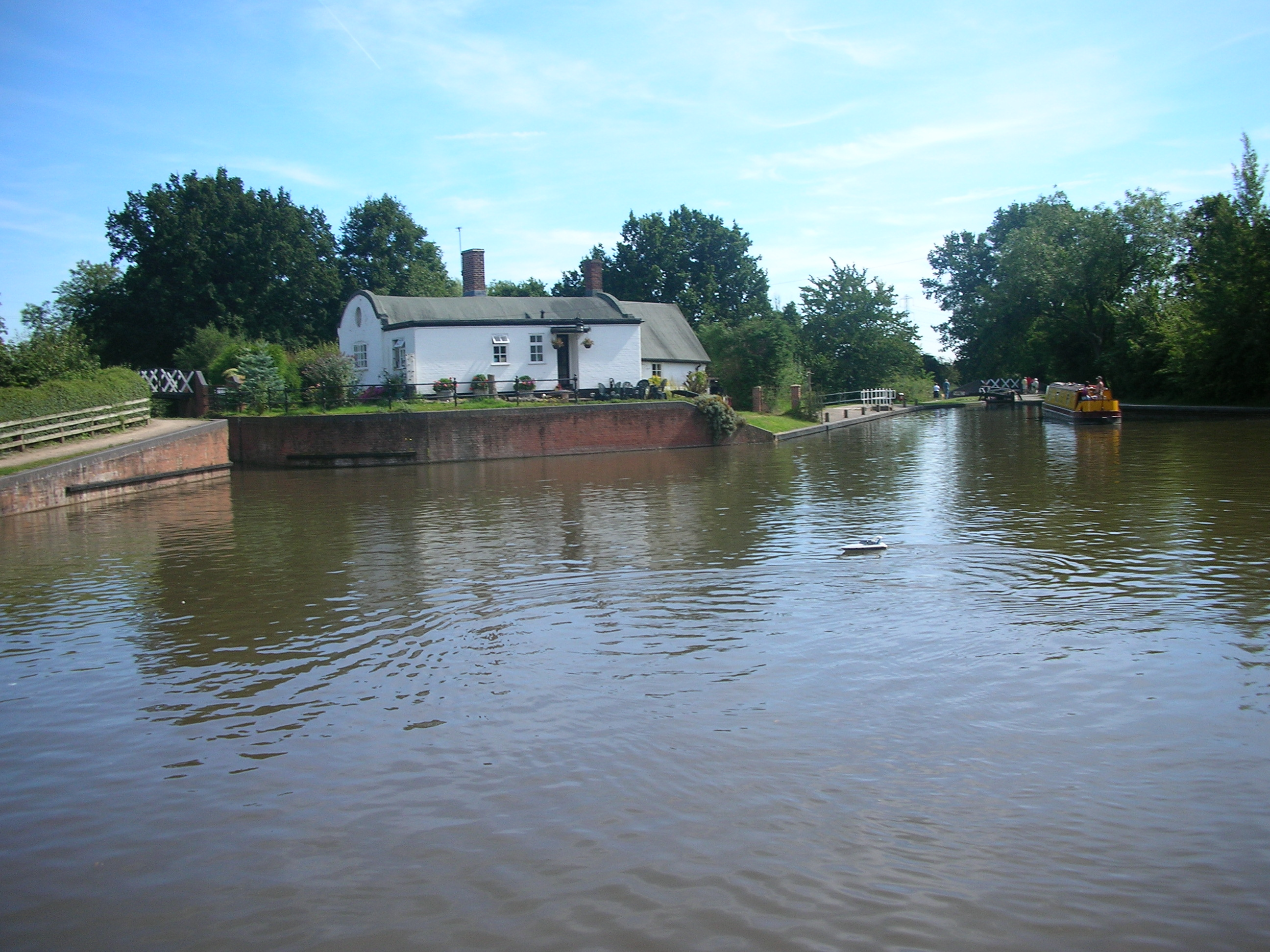
A round-roofed cottage, typical of the Southern Stratford, on the corner of the lockless arm near Lock 22.

== See also ==
- Canals of the United Kingdom
- History of the British canal system

== Bibliography ==
- Cumberlidge, Jane (2009). Inland Waterways of Great Britain (8th Ed.). Imray Laurie Norie and Wilson. ISBN 978-1-84623-010-3.
- Hadfield, Charles (1970). The Canals of the East Midlands. David and Charles. ISBN 0-7153-4871-X.
- Nicholson (2003). Nicholson Guide Vol 3: Birmingham and the Heart of England. Harper Collins. ISBN 0-00-713666-8.
- Pearson, Michael (1989). Canal Companion - Birmingham Canal Navigations. J. M. Pearson & Associates. ISBN 0-907864-49-X.
- Squires, Roger (2008). Britain's restored canals. Landmark Publishing. ISBN 978-1-84306-331-5.
- Ware, Michael E (1989). Britain's Lost Waterways. Moorland Publishing. ISBN 0-86190-327-7.
