= Guillotine lock =

Type of canal lock

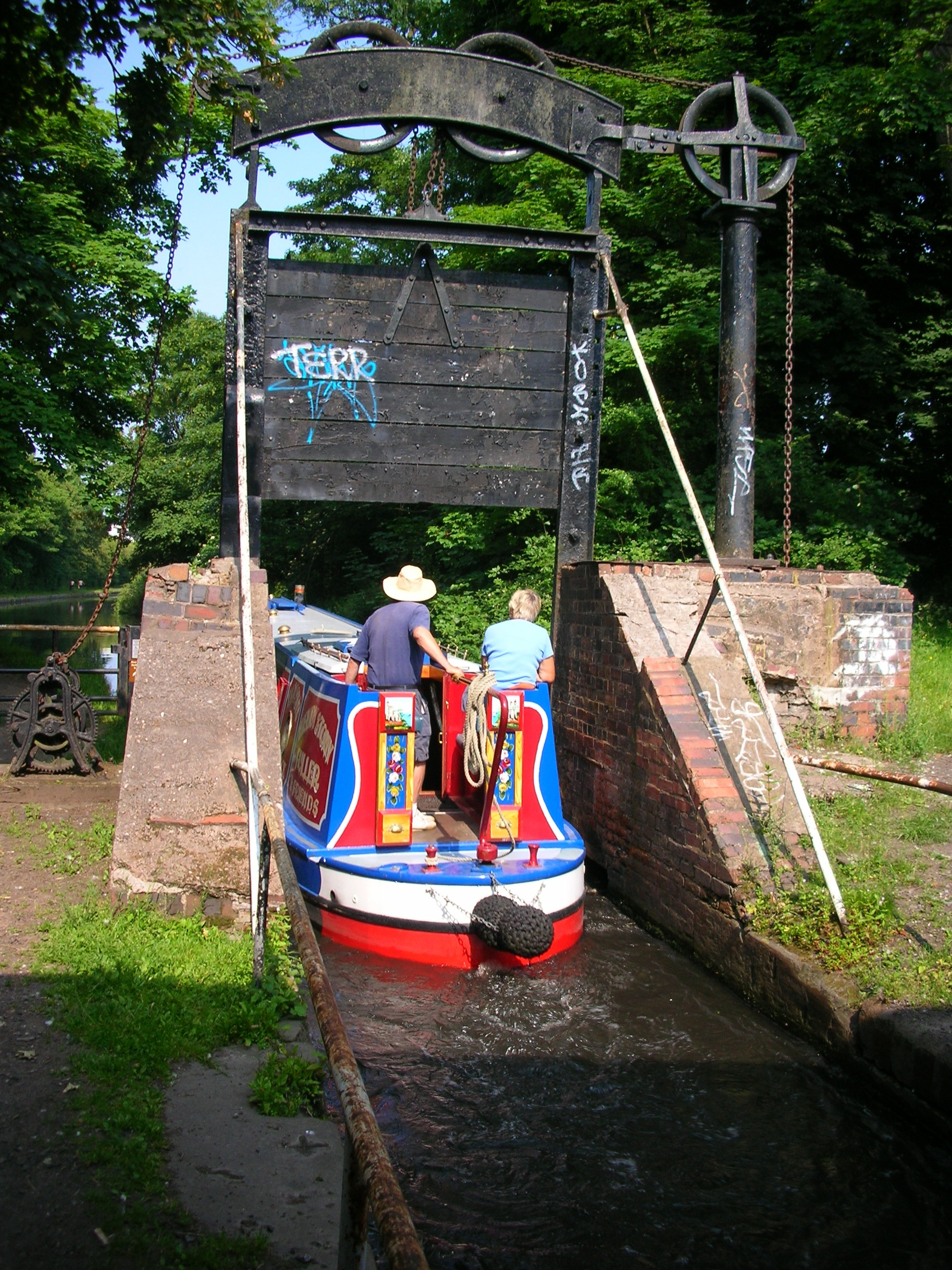
Lifford Lane guillotine stop lock on the Stratford-upon-Avon Canal, 200 metres from Kings Norton Junction, Birmingham. These gates are made of wooden boards and date from 1814.

A guillotine lock is a type of canal lock. The lock itself operates on the same principle as any normal pound lock, but is unusual in that each gate is a single piece, usually of steel, that slides vertically upwards when opened to allow a boat to traverse underneath. The resemblance to the French guillotine is obvious.

Guillotine locks are relatively uncommon, but many are found on the waterways of East Anglia. The advantages over the more traditional design are that the lock occupies less space, does not require room to swing open, and is quicker to fabricate and install. It also acts as a tidal lock, able to hold back water whichever side is higher, and can function as a stop lock (for example, Lifford Lane stop lock near Kings Norton Junction). It is mechanically more complex, however, requiring the use of a gantry and overhead lifting gear.

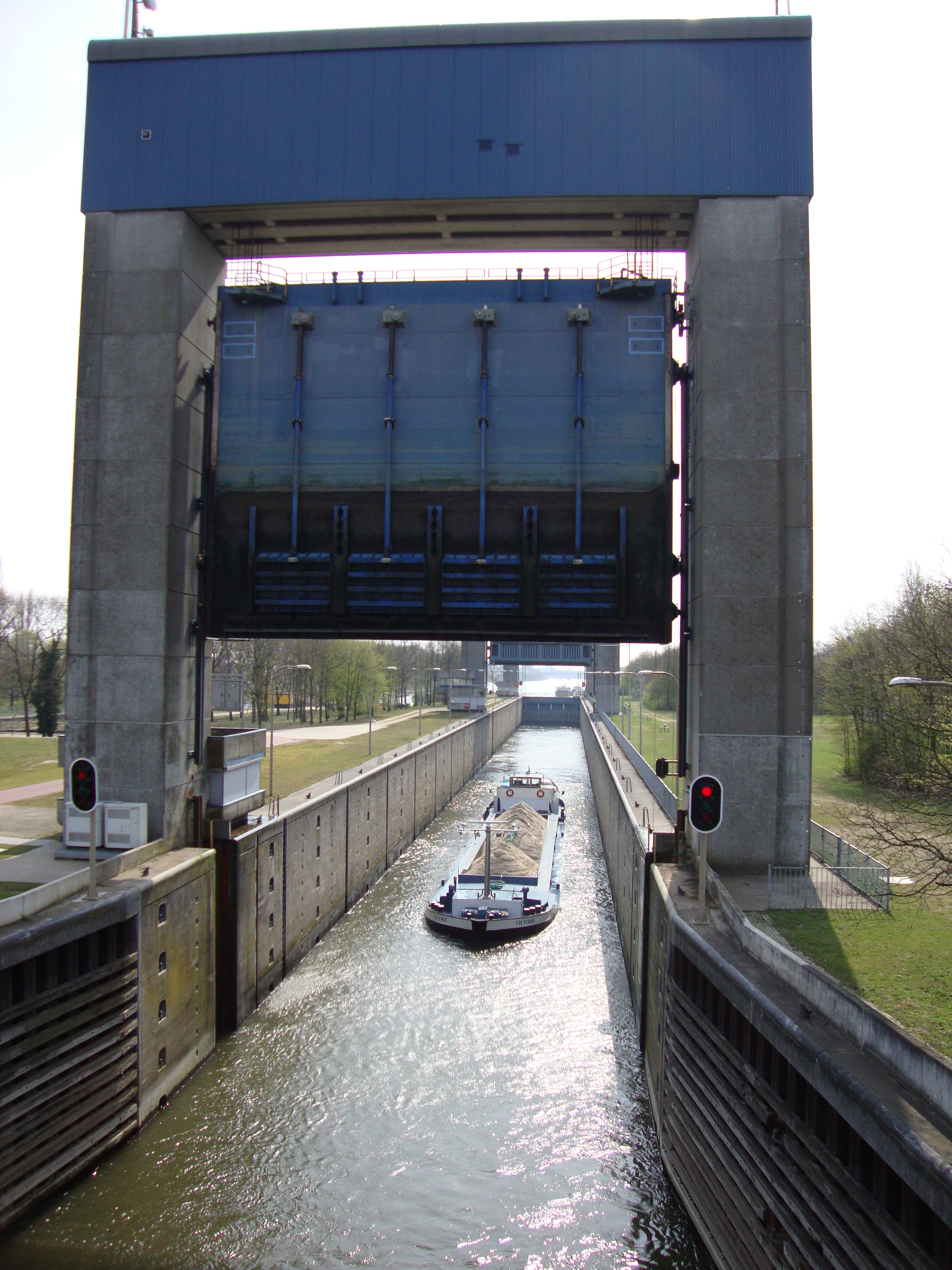
Weurt locks on the Maas-Waal Canal, Nijmegen, the Netherlands. This lock was built around 1975, augmenting an older lock with sliding gates just visible on the left.

A significantly larger one can be found at the northern terminus of the Maas-Waal Canal, between Nijmegen and Weurt in the Netherlands. It demonstrates their use when the water level on the outside, the river Waal in this case, may be both higher or lower than the canal level. Here, the water level on the river varies from about 3 metres (9.8 ft) below to about 5 metres (16 ft) above canal level. The four paddles for equalising the water level are clearly visible, but guillotine gates without paddles exist too. In those, the entire gate is lifted a little bit to allow water in or out of the chamber.

The Weurt lock has an additional gate near the centre of the chamber. When only a few short boats want to go through the lock, they can use one half the chamber, saving water. Furthermore, when one of the gates is taken out of service for maintenance, the lock can still function at reduced capacity. When open, guillotine gates are completely out of the water, so they can be painted without removing them or draining the lock.

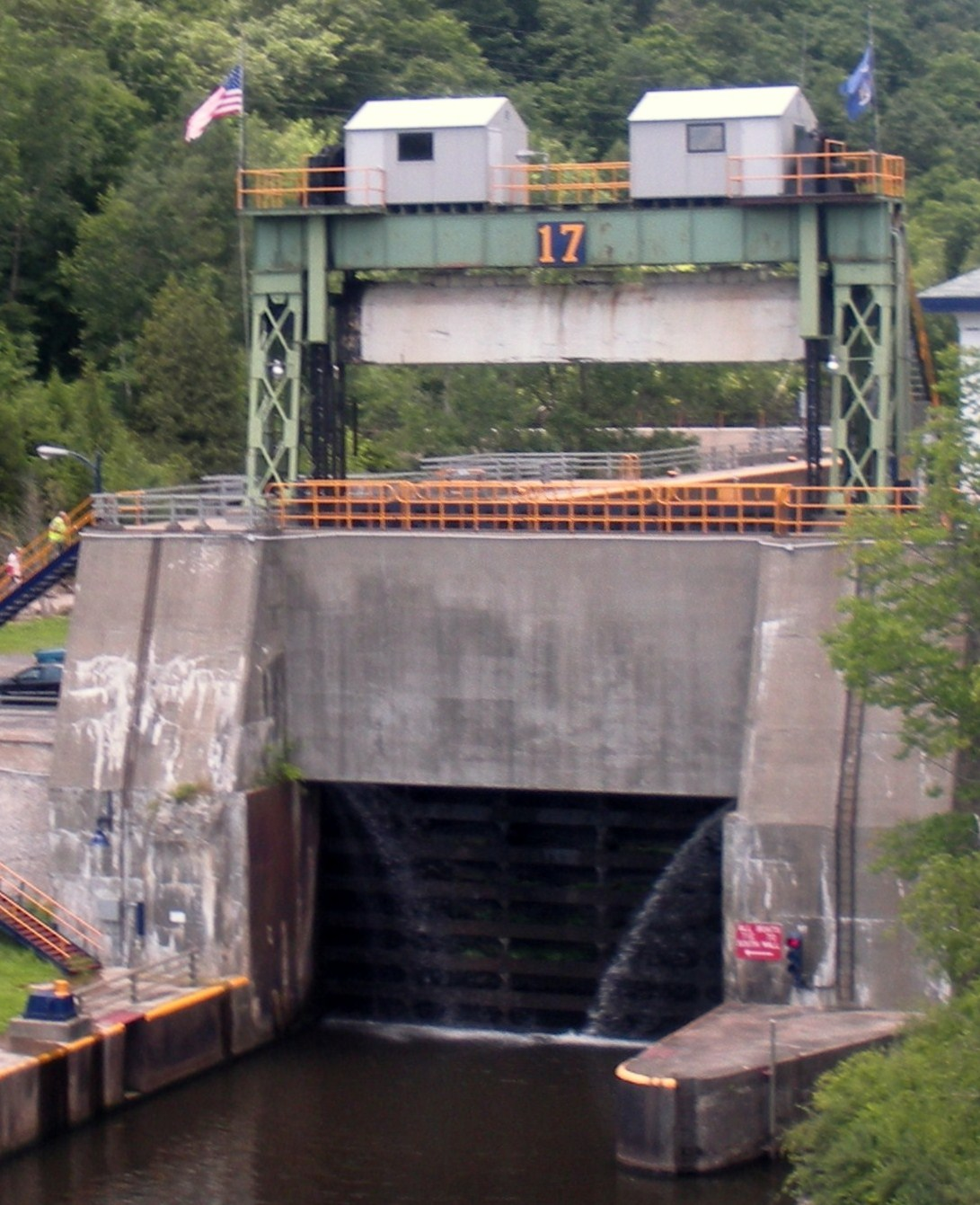
Lock 17 in Little Falls on the Erie Canal

== See also ==
- Canals of the United Kingdom
- History of the British canal system
