= Roses and Castles =

Art style associated with British canals

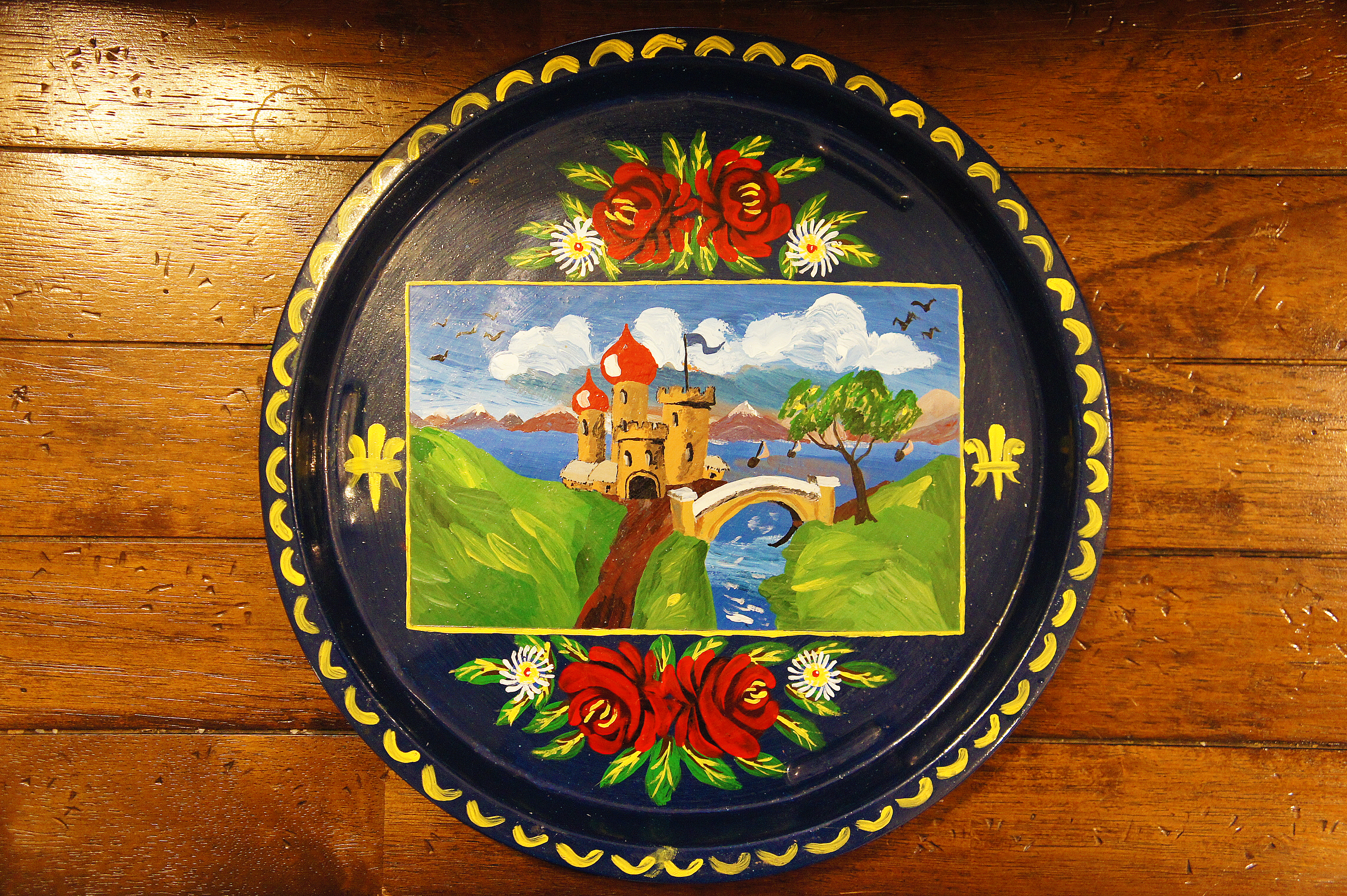
- Tray painted in the traditional Roses and Castles style
- Years active: c. 1858–present
- Location: United Kingdom
- Influences: Folk art, Romani art

Roses and Castles is a style of art used to decorate narrowboats and their fittings. As well as depicting roses and/or castles, the designs often include other flowers and landscapes.

== History ==
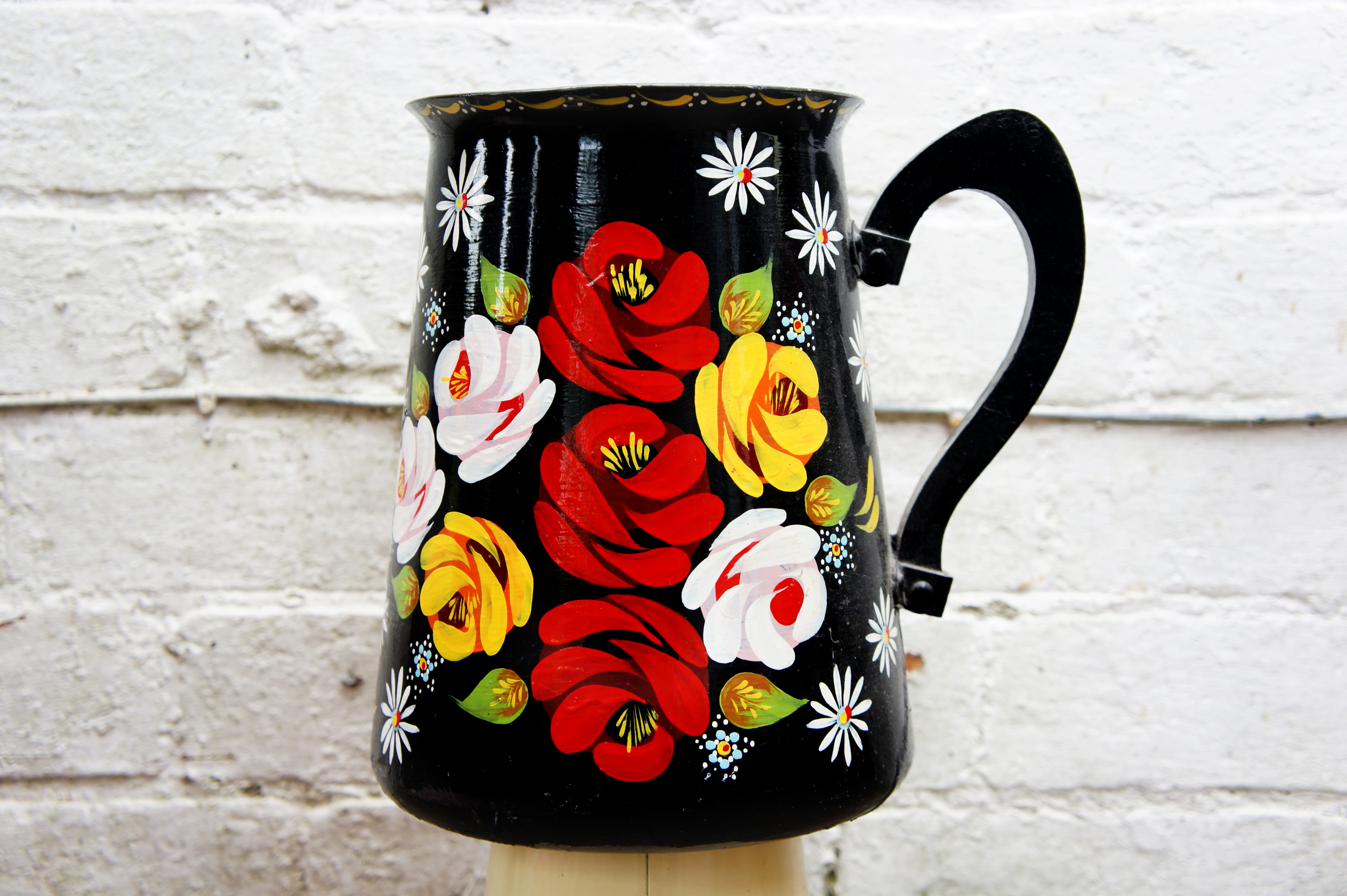
Floral designs may predate those incorporating castles by almost 30 years

=== Origins ===
The style of Roses and Castles likely developed in the 1850s, approaching the decline of the British canal system and at a time when rail was proving a more popular method of transporting goods. A false origin of the style suggests that it originates from the Llangollen Canal in the early 20th century, where a lengthsman grew an abundance of roses and had a picturesque view of Chirk Castle from his garden. In reality, the movement had been well established since 1858. A number of theories to the origin of the design exist. Similarities have been drawn between the style and that used on vardos by Romani people; it is possible that some Romanis took up employment as boatmen and brought their designs with them onto the waterways. In this instance, the suggested influence of castles on the artwork comes from castles in the Carpathian Mountains. Another explanation is that the style originated with a dog-rose design painted by one boatman (or his family) and grew from there; alternatively, it has been noted that the garland of roses design bears resemblance to decorations applied to Sheraton furniture at the turn of the 19th century. It is probable that the design originated from the Birmingham and Black Country area. The use of roses predated the addition of castles; the earliest recorded use of castles in narrowboat decoration is from 1873.

=== Application ===
Many boatmen (and their families) spent significant time on narrowboats and barges, and the artwork became a source of pride as well as individuality. One theory suggests that the amount of time families spent on the canals meant they were undereducated and became ostracised from society, and so the artwork became their "proud statement of separateness, self esteem, and a traditional way of doing things". The art would be applied at the expense of the boatman rather than the boatowning company, who would have ensured the boat was dressed in company livery. Items typically painted in the roses and castles style include internal furniture and fittings, as well as the boat's headlamp and water cans. In The Inland Waterways of England, L. T. C. Rolt described how boatmen would gladly decorate any part of their vessel in "fabulous castle scenes with garlands of roses", and compared the painted boats to "the decorated poop of an Elizabethan galleon".

An early description of the style referred to it as "the great teaboard school of art", a pejorative comparison to cheap tin trays popular at that time. John Hollingshead described the style in Household Words as "fanciful composition landscapes [and] several gaudy wreaths of flowers".

== Design ==
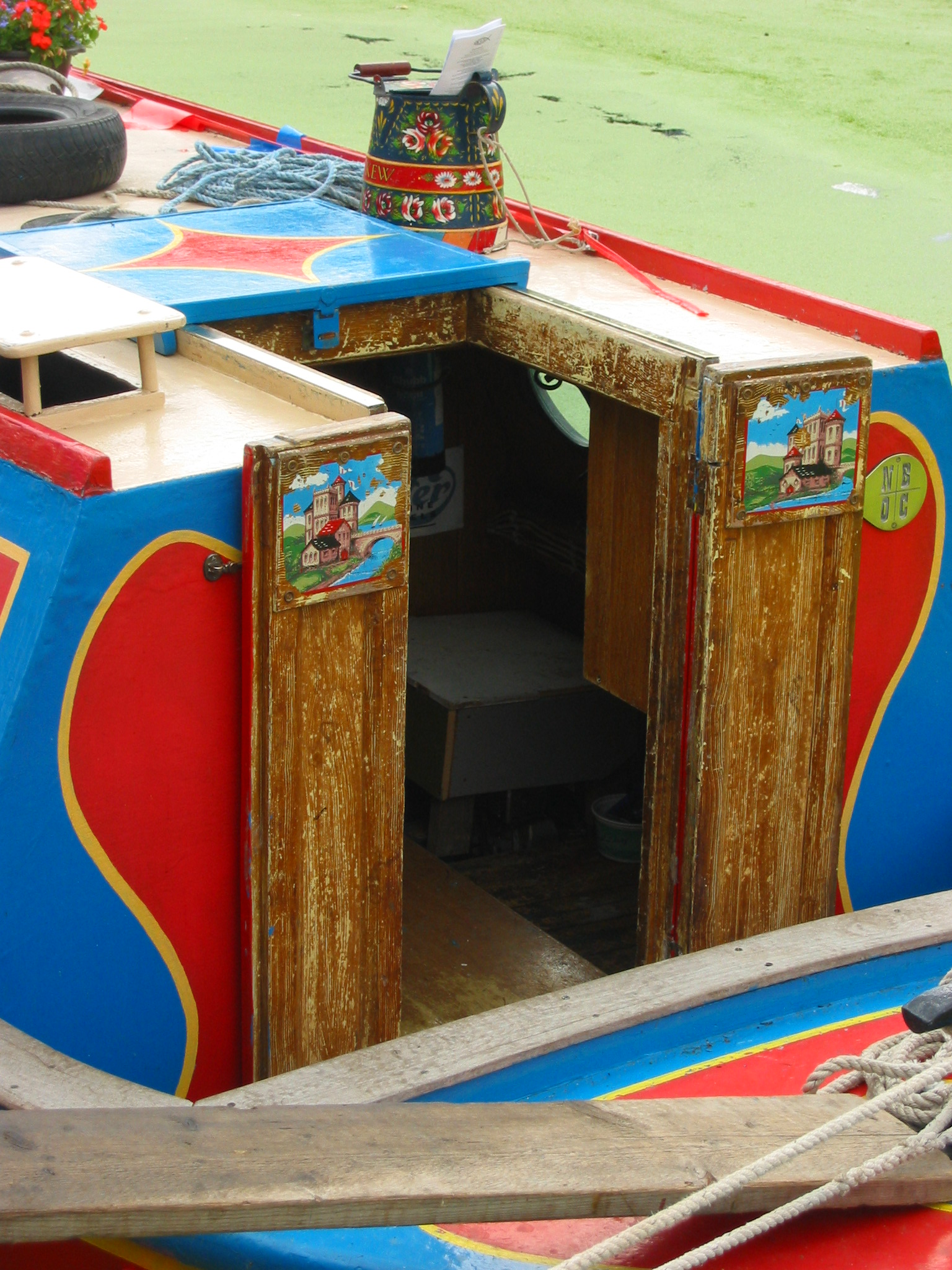
The insides of the stern doors are adorned with castles, and the Buckby Can on the roof is decorated with roses

Links have been drawn between roses and castles and German, Dutch and Asian folk art, as well as a striking resemblance of Romani Gypsy caravans. Robert Aickman described the design as being "brighter and gayer of anything else of the kind now to be found in England", and recognised that it served to advertise waterways. Boat painting was often undertaken by dock and wharf workers, and the styles of particular dockyards—such as those at Polesworth and Braunston—were uniquely identifiable.
