= Kingswood, Warwickshire =

Coordinates: 52.341°N 1.725°W

Kingswood
- Location within Warwickshire
- Area: 1.095 km^{2} (0.423 sq mi)
- Population: 1,152 (2020 estimate)
  - Density: 1,052/km^{2} (2,720/sq mi)
- Civil parish: Lapworth
- District: Warwick
- Shire county: Warwickshire
- Region: West Midlands
- Country: England
- Sovereign state: United Kingdom

Kingswood is an area in the civil parishes of Lapworth and Rowington in Warwick District, Warwickshire, England. It forms the main residential area of the parish of Lapworth, and includes about 18 properties in the parish of Rowington. The population of Lapworth parish was 1,828 in the 2011 Census. The population of Kingswood has been estimated as 1,152 in 2020. Kingswood is situated on the Grand Union Canal and the Stratford-upon-Avon Canal. The two canals meet at Kingswood Junction.

Kingswood also has a railway station called Lapworth railway station. It was originally called Kingswood, but the station name was changed to Lapworth to avoid confusion with Kingswood station in Surrey. Kingswood lies 5 miles north-west of Henley-in-Arden. In 1879-1872 Kingswood was described in the Imperial Gazetteer of England and Wales as a hamlet in the parishes of Lapworth and Rowington and had a unitarian chapel and property valued at £1,027.
