= History of the British canal system =

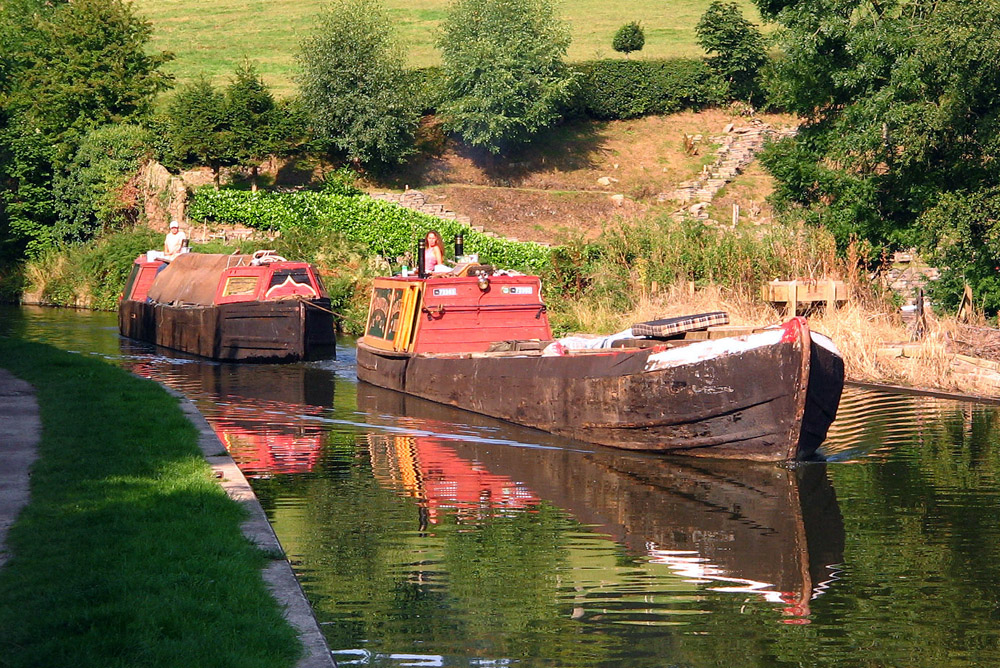
Traditional working canal boats

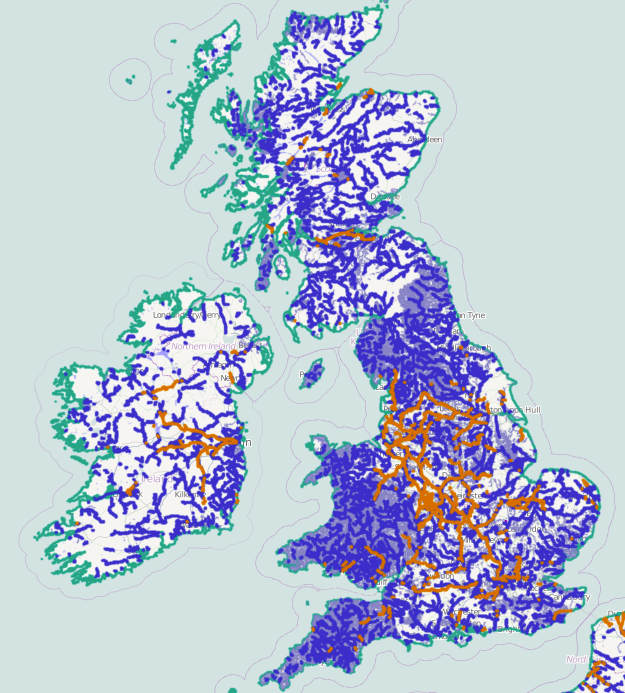
In Great Britain nearly 4,000 miles (6,400 km) of canals (shown in brown) were built

The canal network of the United Kingdom played a vital role in the Industrial Revolution. The UK was the first country to develop a nationwide canal network which, at its peak, expanded to nearly 4,000 miles (6,400 kilometres) in length. The canals allowed raw materials to be transported to a place of manufacture, and finished goods to be transported to consumers, more quickly and cheaply than by a land based route. The canal network was extensive and included feats of civil engineering such as the Anderton Boat Lift, the Manchester Ship Canal, the Worsley Navigable Levels and the Pontcysyllte Aqueduct.

In the post-medieval period, some rivers were canalised for boat traffic. The Exeter Ship Canal was completed in 1567. The Sankey Canal was the first British canal of the Industrial Revolution, opening in 1757. The Bridgewater Canal followed in 1761 and proved to be highly profitable. The majority of the network was built in the "Golden Age" of canals, between the 1770s and the 1830s. From 1840, the canals began to decline, because the growing railway network was a more efficient means of transporting goods. From the beginning of the 20th century, the road network became progressively more important; canals became uneconomic and were abandoned. In 1948, much of the network was nationalised. Since then, canals have been increasingly used for recreation and tourism.

Different types of boats used the canals: the most common was the traditional narrowboat. At the outset the boats were towed by horses, but later they were driven by diesel engines. Some closed canals have been restored, and canal museums have opened.

== History ==
=== Pre-Industrial Revolution transport systems ===
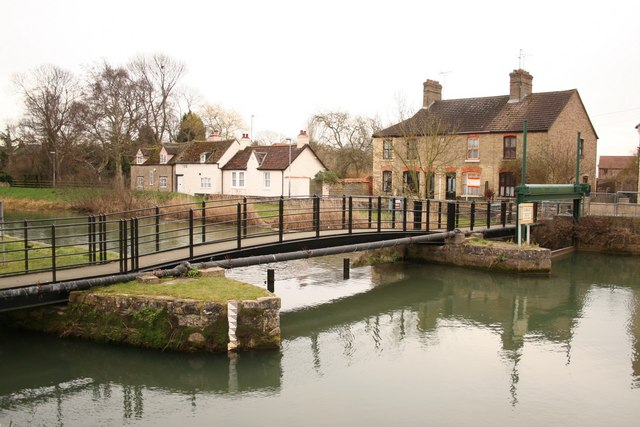
The Stamford Canal opened circa 1670

Prior to the Industrial Revolution, some natural waterways were "canalised" or improved for boat traffic in the 16th century. The first act of Parliament was obtained by the City of Canterbury in 1515, Deepening River at Canterbury Act 1514 (6 Hen. 8. c. 17), to extend navigation on the River Stour in Kent, followed by the River Exe, with the River Exe Act 1539 (31 Hen. 8. c. 4), which led to the construction in 1566 of a new channel, the Exeter Canal. Simple flash locks were provided to regulate the flow of water and allow loaded boats to pass through shallow waters by admitting a rush of water, but these were not purpose-built canals as we understand them today.

The transport system that existed before the canals were built consisted of coastal shipping and horses and carts struggling along mostly unsurfaced mud roads (although there were some surfaced turnpike roads). There was also a small amount of traffic carried along navigable rivers. In the 17th century, as early industry started to expand, this transport situation was highly unsatisfactory. The restrictions of coastal shipping and river transport were obvious, and horses and carts could only carry one or two tons of cargo at a time. The poor state of most of the roads meant that they could often become unusable after heavy rain. Because of the small loads that could be carried, supplies of essential commodities such as coal and iron ore were limited, and this kept prices high and restricted economic growth. One horse-drawn canal barge could carry about thirty tonnes at a time, faster than road transport and at half the cost.

Some 29 river navigation improvements took place in the 16th and 17th centuries. In 1605, the government of King James I established the Oxford-Burcot Commission, which began to improve the system of locks and weirs on the River Thames, which were opened between Oxford and Abingdon by 1635. In 1635 Sir Richard Weston was appointed to develop the River Wey Navigation, making Guildford accessible by 1653. In 1670 the Stamford Canal opened, indistinguishable from 18th century examples with a dedicated cut and double-door locks. In 1699 legislation was passed to permit the Aire and Calder Navigation which was opened 1703, and the Trent Navigation which was built by George Hayne and opened in 1712. Subsequently, the Kennet built by John Hore opened in 1723, the Mersey and Irwell opened in 1725, and the Bristol Avon in 1727. John Smeaton was the engineer of the Calder and Hebble which opened in 1758, and a series of eight pound locks was built to replace flash locks on the River Thames between Maidenhead and Reading, beginning in 1772. The net effect of these was to bring most of England, with the notable exceptions of Birmingham and Staffordshire, within 15 miles (24 km) of a waterway.

By the early 18th century, river navigations such as the Aire and Calder Navigation were becoming quite sophisticated, with pound locks and longer and longer "cuts" (some with intermediate locks) to avoid circuitous or difficult stretches of rivers. Eventually, the experience of building long multi-level cuts with their own locks gave rise to the idea of building a "pure" canal, a waterway designed on the basis of where goods needed to go, not where a river happened to be.

=== The Industrial Revolution ===
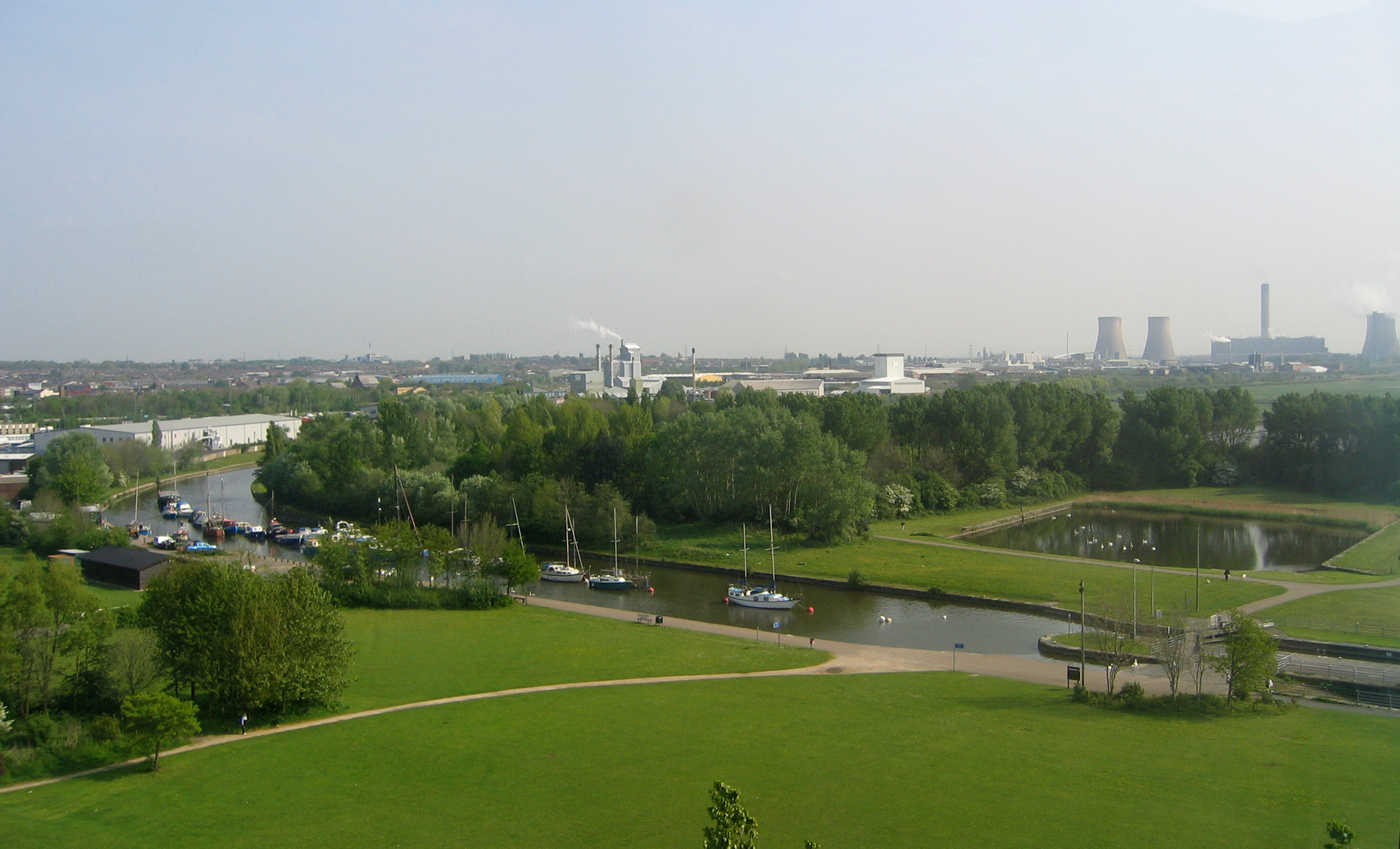
The Sankey Canal as viewed from Spike Island in Widnes

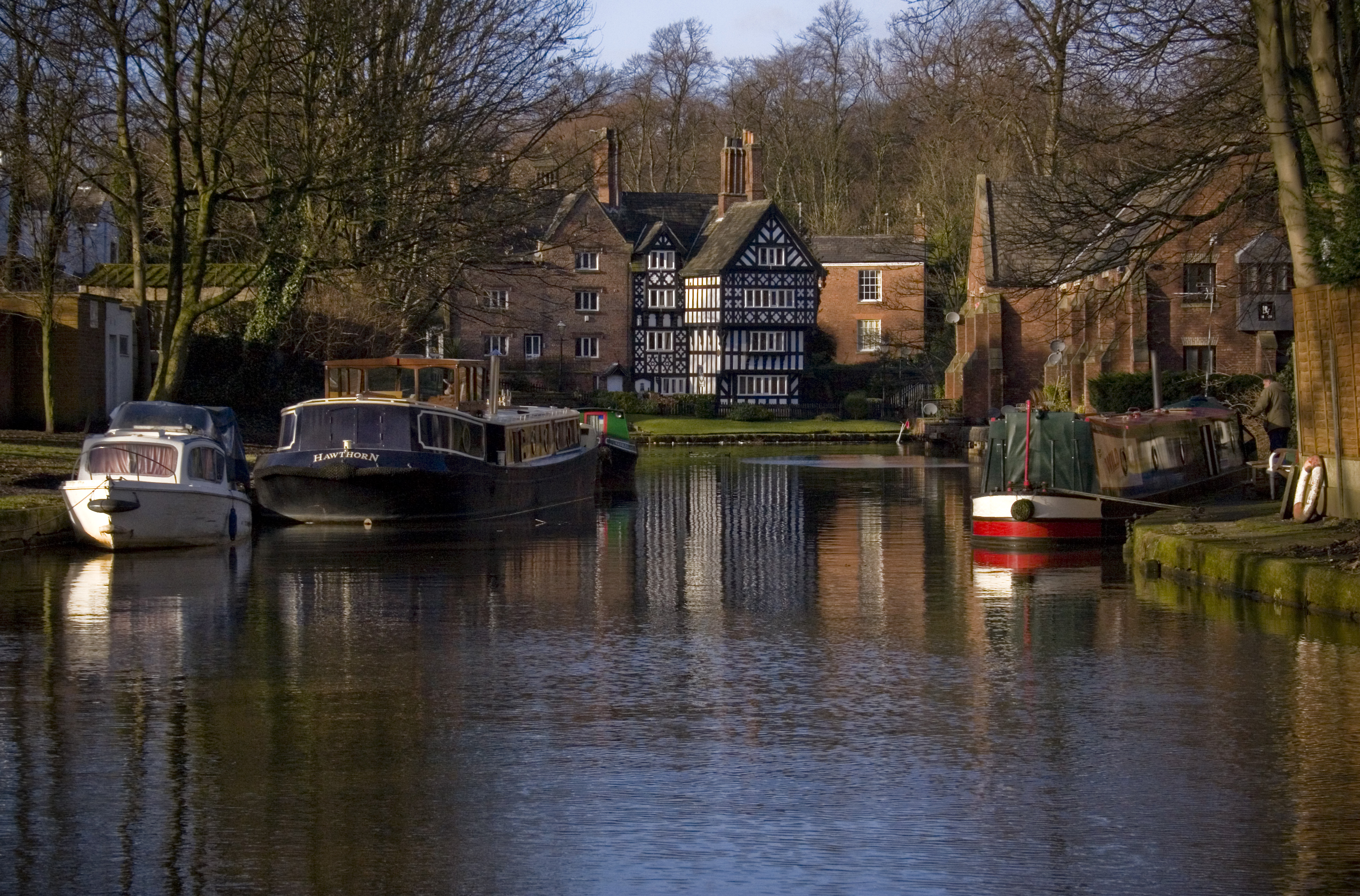
The Bridgewater Canal

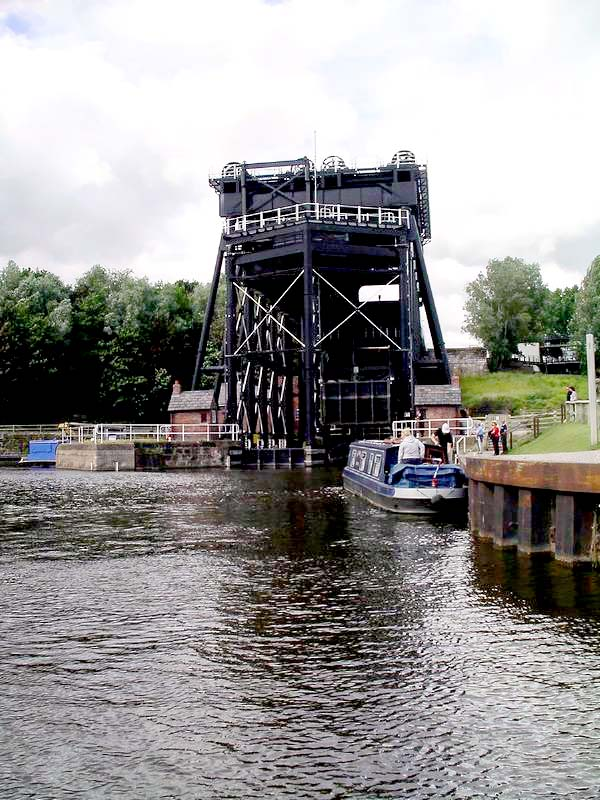
The Anderton Boat Lift

The UK was the first country to develop a nationwide canal network. The canals caused a great change in the economy of Britain. They supported the industries that allowed the country to become the world's first industrial power and supported the economic powerhouse that was the British Empire in the Victorian Era. The canals were built because they offered the most economic and reliable way to transport goods and commodities in large quantities. The navigable water network grew rapidly at first and became an almost completely connected transport network. In addition to the building of new canals, older canals were improved. They were given new embankments, tunnels, aqueducts and cuttings. However, there was often fierce opposition to the building.

The Sankey Canal was the first British canal of the Industrial Revolution, opening in 1757. It connected St Helens with Spike Island in Widnes. The canal fuelled the growth of the chemical industry in Widnes, which subsequently became the centre of the industry in England. In the mid-18th century the 3rd Duke of Bridgewater built the Bridgewater Canal. Its purpose was to transport coal from his mines to the industrialising city of Manchester. He commissioned the engineer James Brindley to build the canal; the design included an aqueduct carrying the canal over the River Irwell. The aqueduct was an engineering wonder which attracted tourists. Its construction was funded entirely by the Duke. It opened in 1761 and was the longest canal constructed in Britain to that date. Canal boats could carry thirty tons at a time; one horse could tow more than ten times the amount of cargo that was possible with a cart. The Bridgewater Canal reduced the price of coal in Manchester by nearly two-thirds within a year of its opening. The canal was a huge financial success and repaid the cost of its construction within just a few years.

The 19th century saw some major new canals such as the Caledonian Canal and the Manchester Ship Canal. The new canals proved highly successful. The boats on the canals were horse-drawn with a towpath alongside the canal for the horse to walk along. This horse-drawn system proved to be highly economical and became standard across the British canal network. Commercial horse-drawn canal boats could be seen on the UK's canals until as late as the 1950s, although by then diesel powered boats, often towing a second unpowered boat, had become standard. During the latter part of the 19th century the boat decoration of Roses and Castles began to appear. In this period, whole families lived aboard the boats.

=== The Golden Age ===
The period between the 1770s and the 1830s is often referred to as the "Golden Age" of British canals. During this period of canal mania, huge sums were invested in canal building. The canal system expanded to nearly 4,000 miles (6,400 kilometres) in length.

At the start of this age, canals were built by groups of private individuals with an interest in improving communications. In Staffordshire the potter Josiah Wedgwood saw an opportunity to bring bulky cargoes of clay to his factory doors, and to minimise breakages of his fragile finished goods as they travelled to market. Within just a few years an embryonic national canal network came into being.

Acts of Parliament were necessary to authorise construction. Canal proposals were put forward by financial investors interested in profiting from dividends, as well as industrial businesses that wanted to move their raw materials and finished goods. There was often out-and-out financial speculation. Speculators would try to buy shares in a newly floated company to sell them on for a profit, regardless of whether the canal was ever profitable, or even built. Rival canal companies were formed, and competition was rampant. For many years, a dispute about tolls meant that goods travelling through Birmingham had to be moved from boats in one canal to boats in the other. On the majority of British canals, the canal-owning companies did not own or run a fleet of boats, since the acts of Parliament setting them up usually prohibited this, in order to prevent monopolies developing. Instead, they charged private operators tolls to use the canal. These tolls were regulated by the acts. From the tolls the owners would try, with varying degrees of success, to maintain the canal, pay back initial loans and pay dividends to their shareholders.

=== Railway competition and decline ===
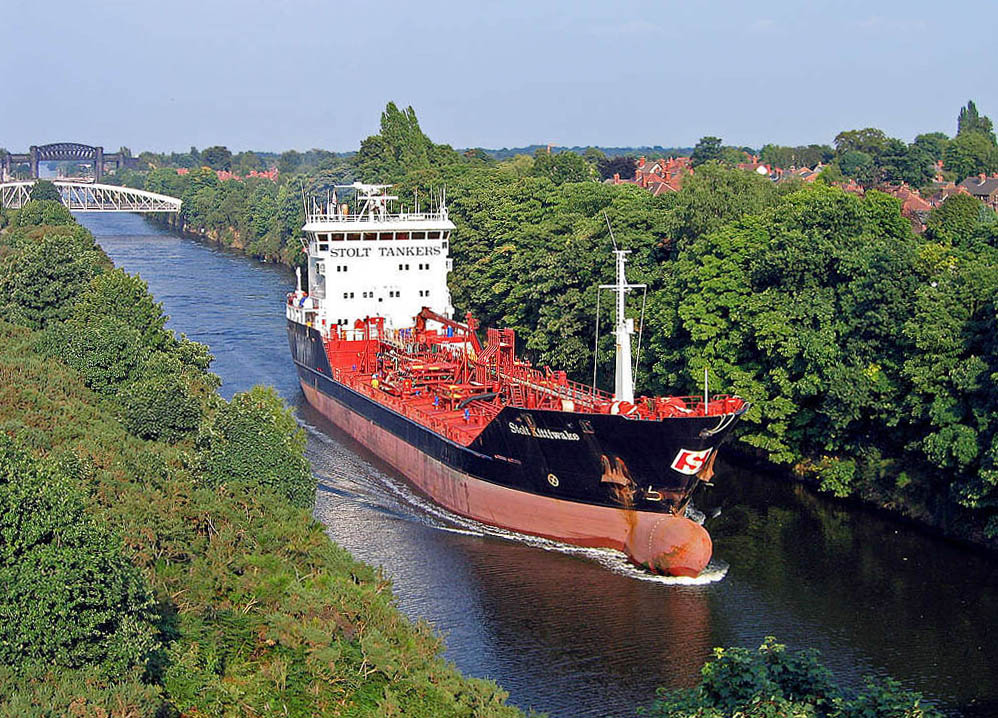
The Manchester Ship Canal

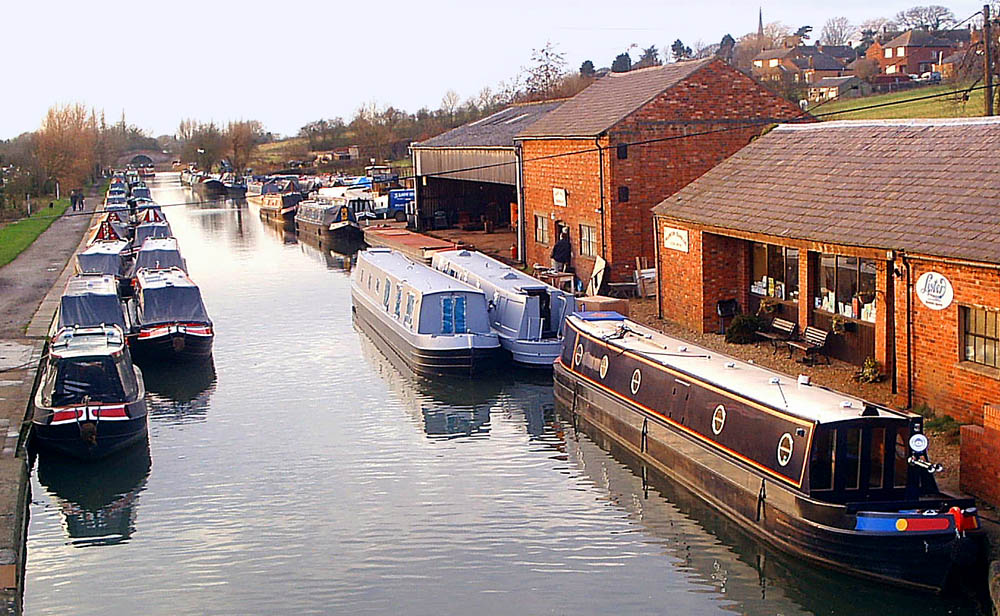
The Grand Union Canal

From about 1840, the railway network gained greater importance. With the transition from short-distance horse-drawn tramways to increasingly practical, powerful steam locomotives, trains could not only carry more than the canals, but could transport people and goods far more quickly than the walking pace of the canal boats. Most of the investment that had previously gone into canal building was diverted into railway building. By the second half of the 19th century, many canals were owned by railway companies or competing with them, and many were in decline, with decreases in mile-ton charges to try to remain competitive. After this, the less successful canals (particularly narrow-locked canals, whose boats could only carry about thirty tons) failed quickly. Faced with decline, there were at least two attempts by canal owners to convert their canal to a railway. This was vigorously opposed by competing rail interests, and so failed to gain the necessary acts of Parliament.

Canal companies could not compete against the speed of the new railways, and in order to survive, they had to slash their prices. This put an end to the huge profits that canal companies had enjoyed before the coming of the railways, and also had an effect on the boatmen who faced a drop in wages. Flyboat working (see § Boats below) virtually ceased, as it could not compete with the railways on speed and the boatmen found they could only afford to keep their families by taking them with them on the boats. This became standard practice across the canal system, often with families with several children living in tiny boat cabins, creating a considerable community of boat people. Though this community ostensibly had much in common with Gypsies, both communities strongly resisted any such comparison, and surviving boat people feel deeply insulted if described as "water gypsies".

By the 1850s the railway system had become well established, and the amount of cargo carried on the canals had fallen by nearly two-thirds, lost mostly to railway competition. In many cases struggling canal companies were bought out by railway companies. Sometimes this was a tactical move by railway companies to gain ground in their competitors' territory, but sometimes canal companies were bought out either to close them down and remove competition, or to build a railway on the line of the canal. A notable example of this is the Croydon Canal. Some larger canal companies survived independently and continued to make profits. The canals survived through the 19th century largely by occupying the niches in the transport market that the railways had missed, or by supplying local markets such as the coal-hungry factories and mills of the big cities.

During the 19th century the canal systems of many European countries such as France, Germany and the Netherlands were modernised and widened to take much larger boats. This did not happen on a large scale in the UK, mainly because of the power of the railway companies, who owned most of the canals and saw no reason to invest in a competing form of transport. The only significant exception to this was the modernisation carried out on the Grand Union Canal in the 1930s. Thus, almost uniquely in Europe, many of the UK's canals remain as they have been since the 18th and 19th centuries: mostly operated with narrowboats. An exception to this stagnation was the Manchester Ship Canal, newly built in the 1890s using the existing River Irwell and River Mersey, to take ocean-going ships into the centre of Manchester via its neighbour Salford.

=== Road competition and nationalisation ===
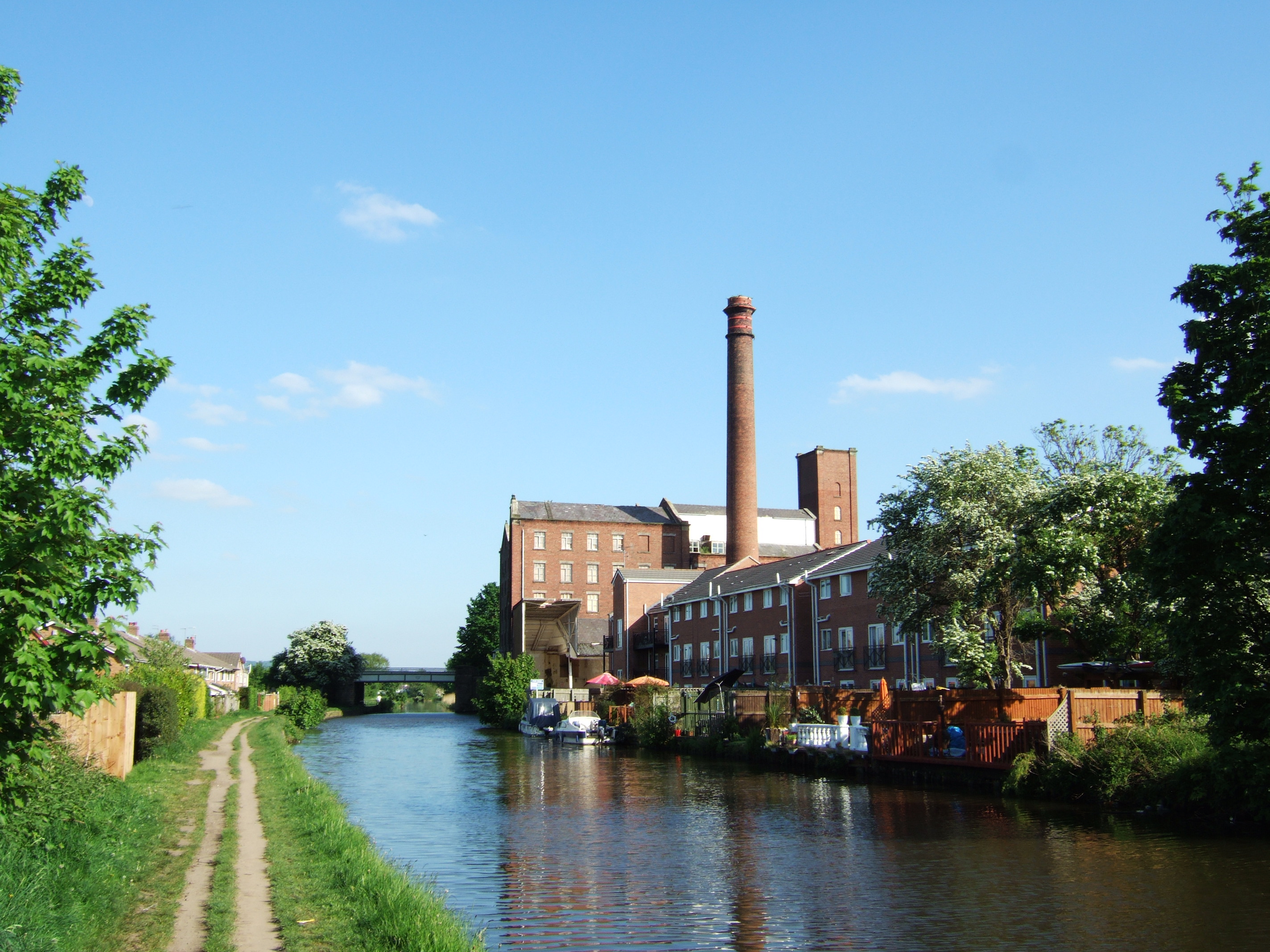
The Leeds and Liverpool Canal linked the two cities

The 20th century brought competition from road haulage, and the network declined further. In the 1920s and 1930s many canals in rural areas were abandoned due to falling traffic. The main network saw brief surges in use during World War I and World War II. Most of the canal system and inland waterways were nationalised in 1948 and came under the control of the British Transport Commission, whose subsidiary, the Docks and Inland Waterways Executive, managed them into the 1950s. A report in 1955 by the British Transport Commission placed the canals into three categories according to their economic prospects: waterways to be developed, waterways to be retained, and waterways having insufficient commercial prospects to justify their retention for navigation.

During the 1950s and 1960s freight transport on the canals declined rapidly in the face of mass road transport. Coal was still being delivered to waterside factories that had no other convenient access. But many factories that had formerly used coal either switched to using other fuels, often because of the Clean Air Act 1956, or closed completely.

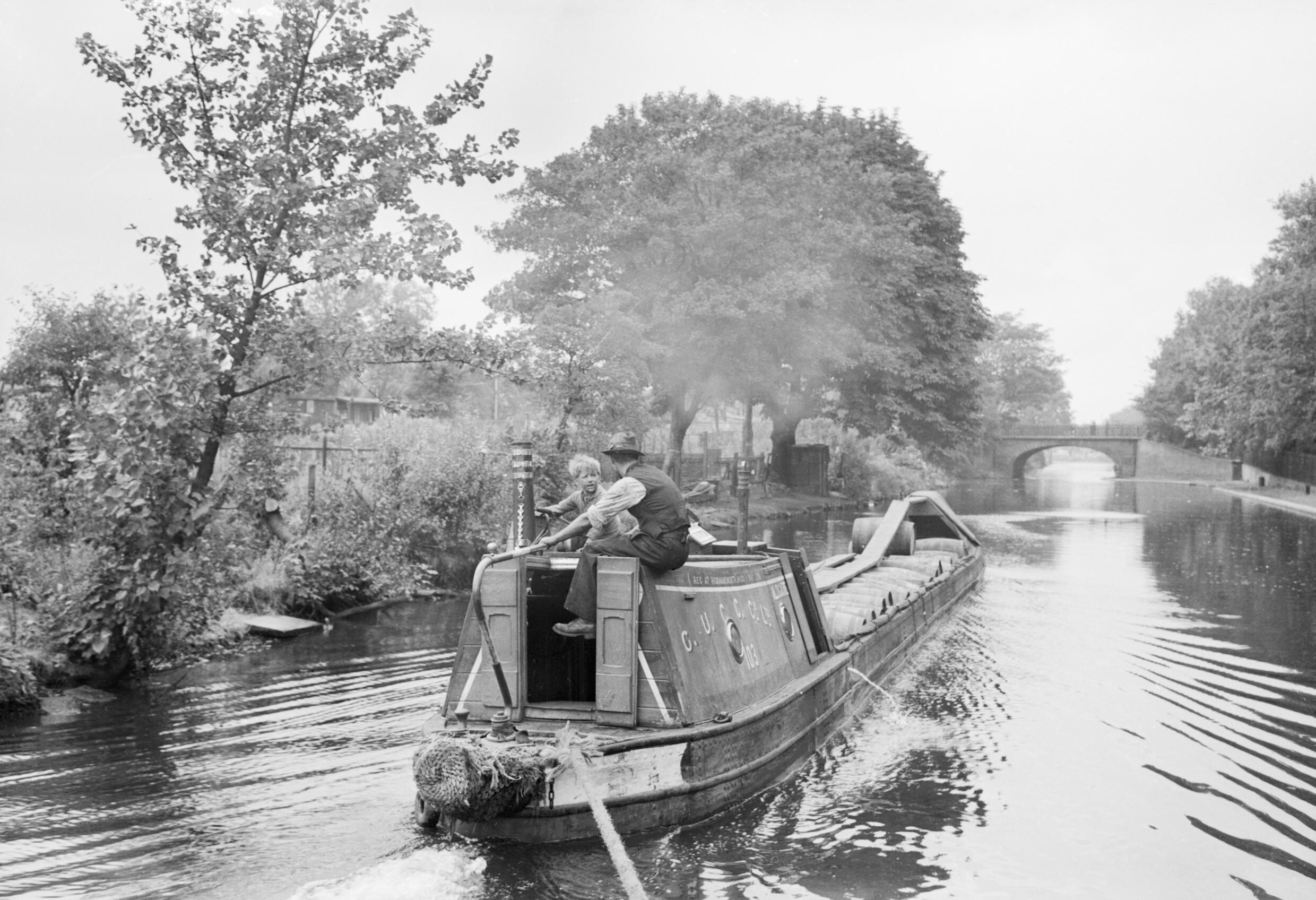
Regent's Canal in 1944

This period was the most destructive for former waterways. The rise in road transport, and enthusiasm for development of new urban trunk roads and motorways, led to many routes being built over, such as parts of the Stroudwater Navigation for the M5, A38, A419, and Dr. Newton's Way. Separately, old canal beds were used as landfill sites, destroyed by flood relief work on nearby rivers, or simply built over during the post-war housing boom.

Under the Transport Act 1962, the surviving canals were transferred in 1963 to the British Waterways Board (BWB), which later became British Waterways. In the same year the BWB decided to formally cease most of its narrowboat operations and transfer them to a private operator called Willow Wren Canal Transport Services. By then the canal network had shrunk to 2,000 miles (3,200 km), half the size it was at its peak in the early 19th century. However, the basic network was still intact; many of the closures were of duplicate routes or branches. By the mid-1960s only a token traffic was left.

The Transport Act 1968 required the British Waterways Board to keep commercial waterways fit for commercial use, and cruising waterways fit for cruising. However, these obligations were subject to the caveat of being by the most economical means. There was no requirement to keep them in a navigable condition; they were to be treated in the most economic way possible, which could mean abandonment. British Waterways could also change the classification of an existing waterway. All or part of the canals could be transferred to local authorities; this allowed roads to be built over them, mitigating the need to build expensive bridges and aqueducts. The last regular long distance narrowboat commercial contract, transporting coal from Atherstone to the Kearley and Tonge jam factory at Southall in west London, ended in 1971. Lime juice continued to be carried between Brentford and Boxmoor until 1981. Substantial tonnages of aggregates were carried by narrowboat on the Grand Union Canal until 1996.

=== Growth of the leisure industry ===
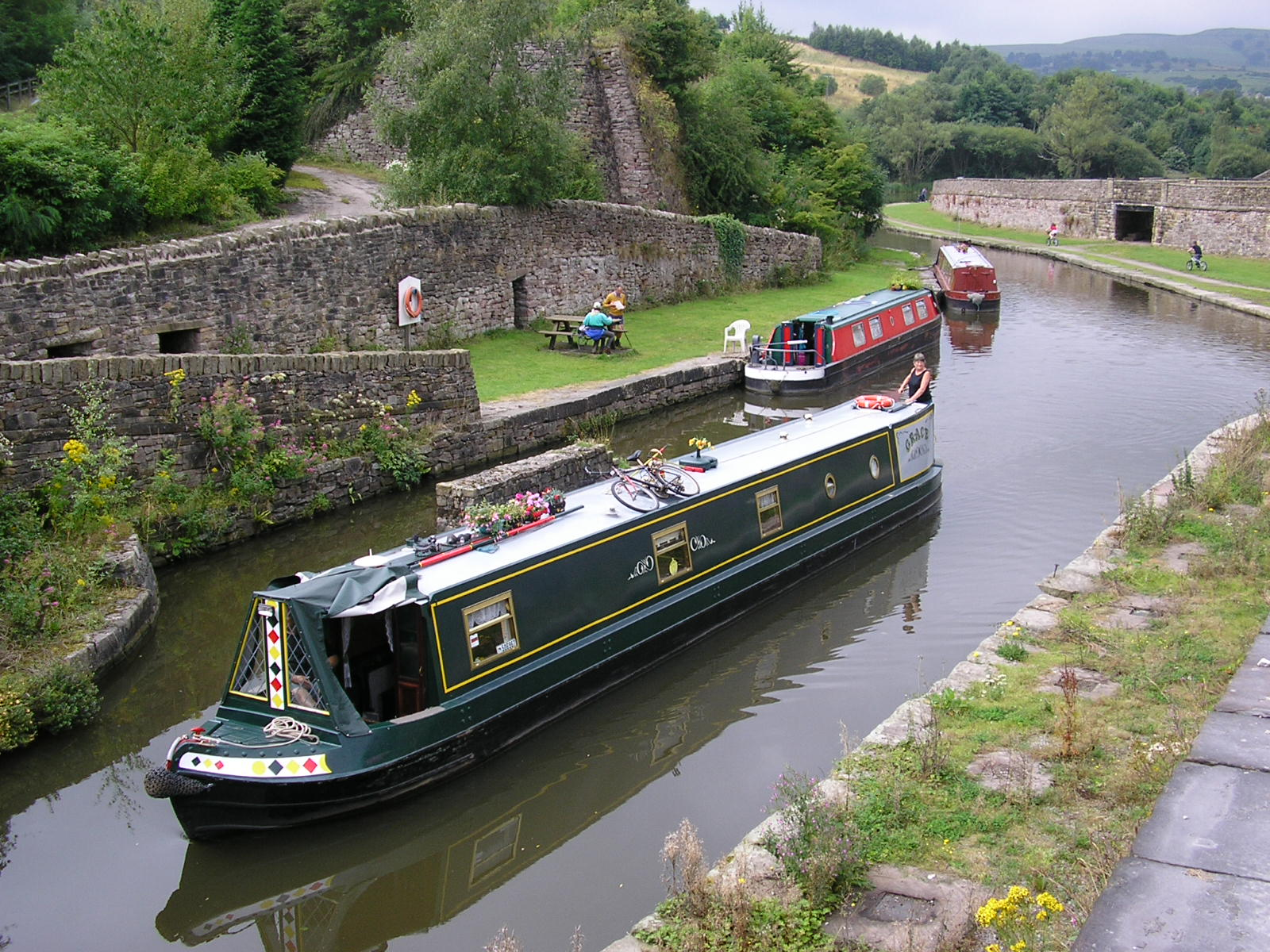
A modern narrowboat being used for recreation

The establishment in 1946 of a group called the Inland Waterways Association by L. T. C. Rolt and Robert Aickman helped revive interest in the UK's canals to the point where they are a major leisure destination. In the 1960s the infant canal leisure industry was only just sufficient to prevent the closure of the remaining canals, but then the pressure to maintain canals for leisure purposes increased. Although out of commercial or leisure use, many canals survived because they formed part of local water supply and drainage networks. From the 1970s, increasing numbers of closed canals were restored by enthusiast volunteers.

The Canal and River Trust maintains a list of the sites it believes are the most important; it is called the Seven Wonders of the Waterways. The list includes:

- Standedge Tunnel, the longest, deepest, and highest canal tunnel in the United Kingdom.
- The Caen Hill Flight lock flight, one of the longest continuous lock flights in the country.
- Barton Swing Aqueduct, the world's only swinging aqueduct, on the Bridgewater canal.
- The Anderton Boat Lift, the world's first commercially successful boat lift and until the opening of the Falkirk Wheel the only boat lift in the United Kingdom.
- Bingley Five Rise Locks, a staircase lock that is the steepest in the country.
- Burnley Embankment, an innovative solution to a canal crossing a wide valley.
- The Pontcysyllte Aqueduct, the longest and highest aqueduct in the United Kingdom.

=== Role in the slave trade ===
During the Atlantic Slave Trade, some canals were also used to carry cotton, tobacco and sugar produced by slaves. Moses Benson, a Liverpool slaver, invested in the Lancaster Canal, which subsequently had a dramatic effect on the economy of Preston.

Other slavers like Lowbridge Bright sat on the board of Thames and Severn Canal Company. George Hyde Dyke was a shareholder in the Peak Forest Canal Company. William Carey owned shares in the Grand Junction Canal.

== Construction, features and maintenance ==
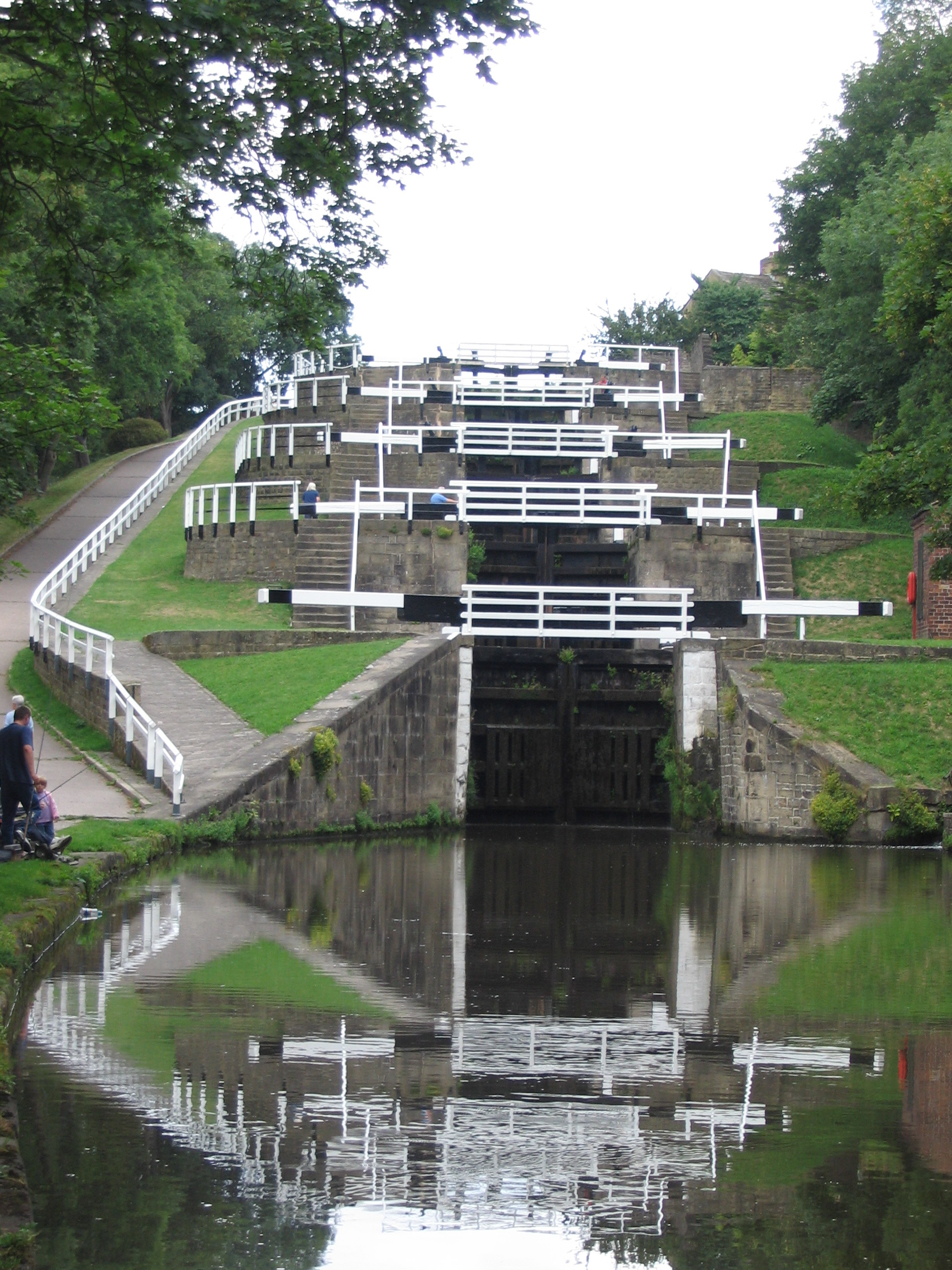
Bingley Five Rise Locks, a set of staircase locks

Locks are the most common means of raising or lowering a boat from one water level to another. The distinguishing feature of a lock is a fixed chamber whose water-level can be changed. For reasons of economy and the constraints of 18th-century engineering technology, the early canals were built to a narrow width. The standard for the dimensions of narrow canal locks was set by Brindley with his first canal locks, those on the Trent and Mersey Canal in 1776. These locks were 72 feet 7 inches (22.12 m) long by 7 feet 6 inches (2.29 m) wide. The narrow width was perhaps chosen because he could only build Harecastle Tunnel to accommodate 7 feet (2.1 m) wide boats. His next locks were wider. He built locks 72 feet 7 inches (22.12 m) long by 15 feet (4.6 m) wide when he extended the Bridgewater Canal to Runcorn, where the canal's only locks lowered boats to the River Mersey. The narrow locks on the Trent and Mersey limited the width (beam) of the boats (which came to be called narrowboats), and thus limited the quantity of the cargo they could carry to around thirty tonnes. This meant that in later years the canal network was economically uncompetitive for freight transport, and by the mid 20th century it was no longer possible to work a thirty-tonne load economically.

Where a large height difference has to be overcome, locks are built close together in a flight such as at Caen Hill Locks. Where the gradient is very steep, a set of staircase locks are sometimes used, like Bingley Five Rise Locks. At the other extreme stop locks have little or no change in level but were built to conserve water where one canal joined another. An interesting example is King's Norton Stop Lock which was built with guillotine gates.

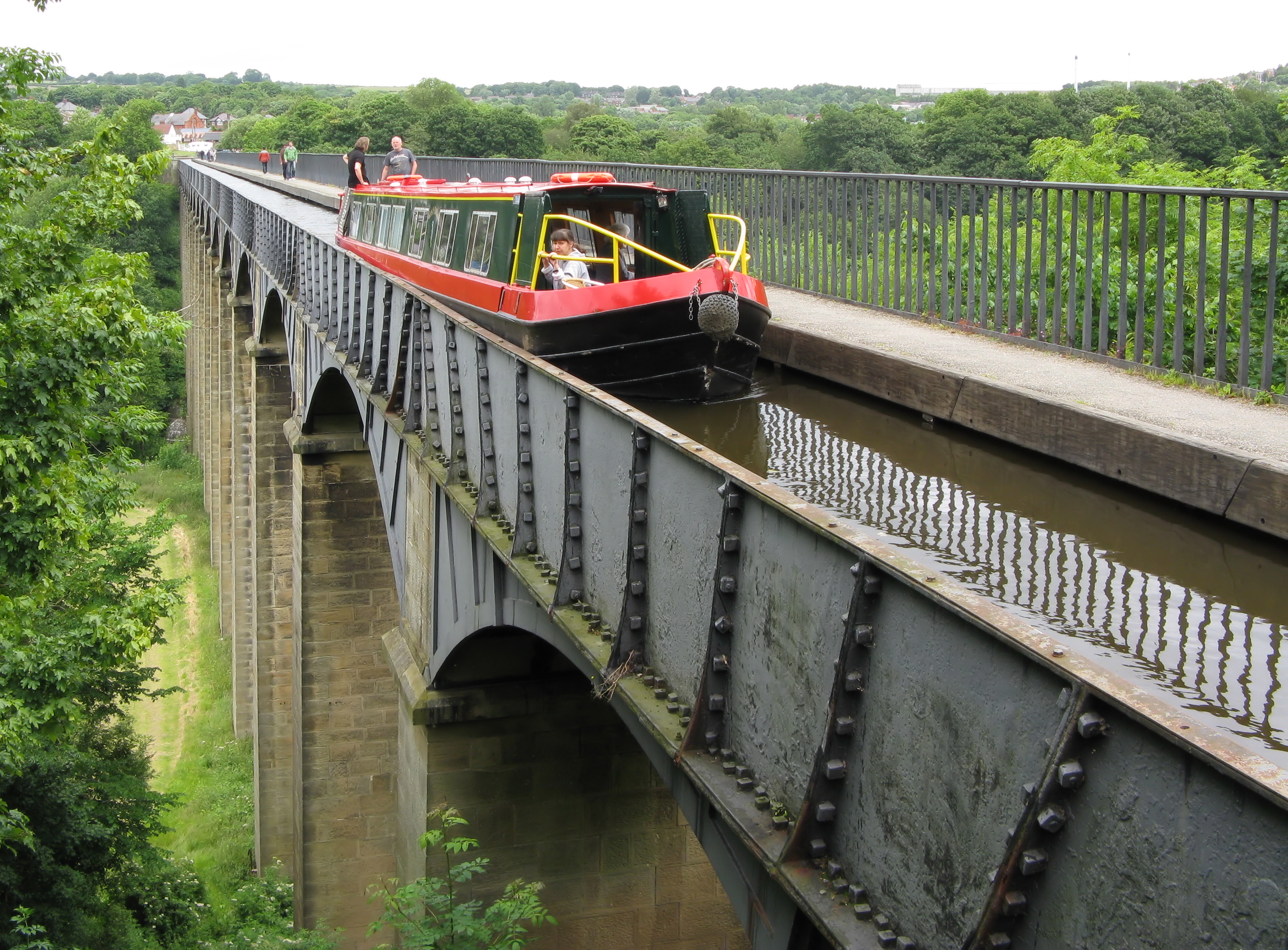
A canal boat traverses the Pontcysyllte Aqueduct in Wales

Canal aqueducts are structures that carry a canal across a valley, road, railway, or another canal. Dundas Aqueduct is built of stone in a classical style. Pontcysyllte Aqueduct is an iron trough on tall stone piers. Barton Swing Aqueduct opens to let ships pass underneath on the Manchester Ship Canal. Three Bridges, London is a clever arrangement allowing the routes of the Grand Junction Canal, a road, and a railway line to cross each other.

Boat lifts are mechanical elevators that raise a canal boat vertically in one motion, rather than being raised by a series of locks. Examples are the Anderton Boat Lift, Falkirk Wheel and Combe Hay Caisson Lock.

Inclined planes raise a canal boat up a hill on a track, powered by a pulley mechanism. Examples are the Hay Inclined Plane, Foxton Inclined Plane and Worsley Underground Incline.

Tunnels take canal boats horizontally through a rock formation. In winter, special icebreaker boats with reinforced hulls would be used to break the ice.

The engineers who designed and built the canals included: Henry Berry, James Brindley, James Dadford, John Dadford, Thomas Dadford, Thomas Dadford Jr., William Jessop, James Green, Sir Edward Leader Williams, Thomas Telford and John Rennie the Elder.

== Boats ==
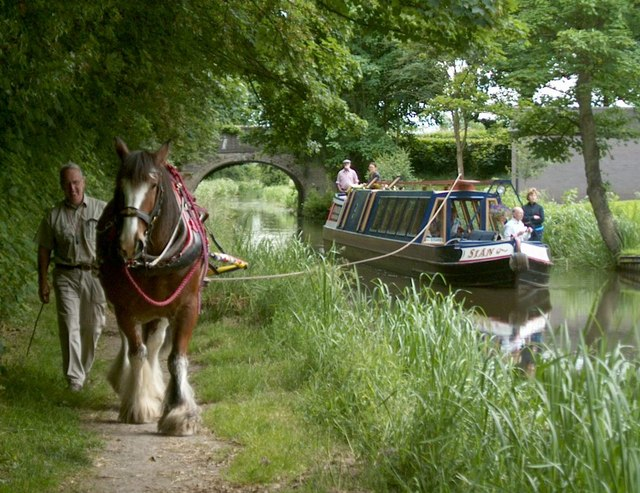
Originally canal boats were horse drawn

The boats used on canals were usually derived from local coasting or river craft, but on the narrow canals the 7-foot-wide (2.1 m) narrowboat was the standard. Their 72-foot (22 m) length came from the boats used on the Mersey estuary, with their width of 7 feet (2.1 m) chosen as half that of existing boats. Packet boats carried packages up to 112 pounds (51 kg) in weight as well as passengers at relatively high speed day and night. To compete with railways, the flyboat was introduced, cargo-carrying boats working day and night. These boats were crewed by three men, who operated a watch system whereby two men worked while the other slept. Horses were changed regularly. When steam boats were introduced in the late nineteenth century, crews were enlarged to four. The boats were owned and operated by individual carriers, or by carrying companies who would pay the captain a wage depending on the distance travelled, and the amount of cargo.

Many different varieties of boats were used on the canals. They included cabin cruisers, fly-boats, Humber Keels, Mersey Flats, narrowboats, trows, sloops and tub boats.

== Restoration ==
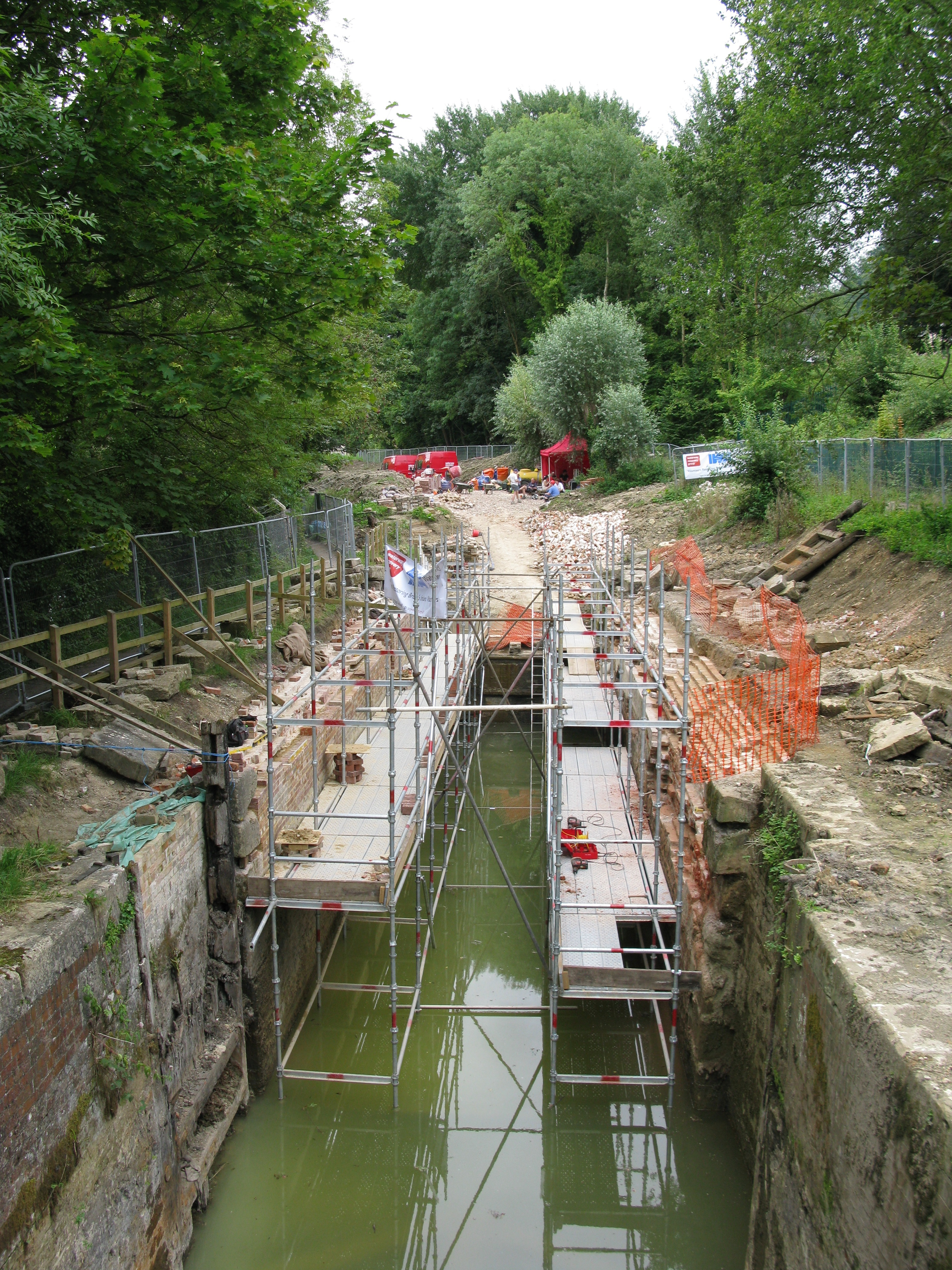
The Thames and Severn Canal during restoration work

Waterway restoration organisations have returned many hundreds of miles of abandoned and remainder canals to use, and work is still ongoing to save many more. Many restoration projects have been led by local canal societies or trusts, who were initially formed to fight the closure of a remainder waterway or to save an abandoned canal from further decay. They now work with local authorities and landowners to protect historic routes or proposed future diversions from being built over, develop restoration plans, and secure funding. The physical work is sometimes done by contractors, sometimes by volunteers. In 1970 the Waterway Recovery Group was formed to co-ordinate volunteer efforts on canals and river navigations throughout the United Kingdom.

British Waterways began to see the economic and social potential of canalside development, and moved from hostility towards restoration, through neutrality, towards a supportive stance. While British Waterways was broadly supportive of restoration, its official policy was that it would not take on the support of newly restored navigations unless they came with a sufficient dowry to pay for their ongoing upkeep. In effect, this meant either reclassifying the Remainder Waterway as a Cruising Waterway or entering into an agreement for another body to maintain the waterway. Today the great majority of canals in England and Wales are managed by the Canal & River Trust which, unlike its predecessor British Waterways, tries to have a more positive view of canal restoration and in some cases actively supports ongoing restoration projects such as the restoration projects on the Manchester Bolton & Bury Canal and the Grantham Canal.

There has also been a movement to redevelop canals in inner city areas, such as Birmingham, Manchester, Salford and Sheffield, which have both numerous waterways and urban blight. In these cities, waterways redevelopment provides a focus for successful commercial/residential developments such as Gas Street Basin in Birmingham, Castlefield Basin and Salford Quays in Manchester, Victoria Quays in Sheffield. However, these developments are sometimes controversial. In 2005 environmentalists complained that housing developments on London's waterways threatened the vitality of the canal system.

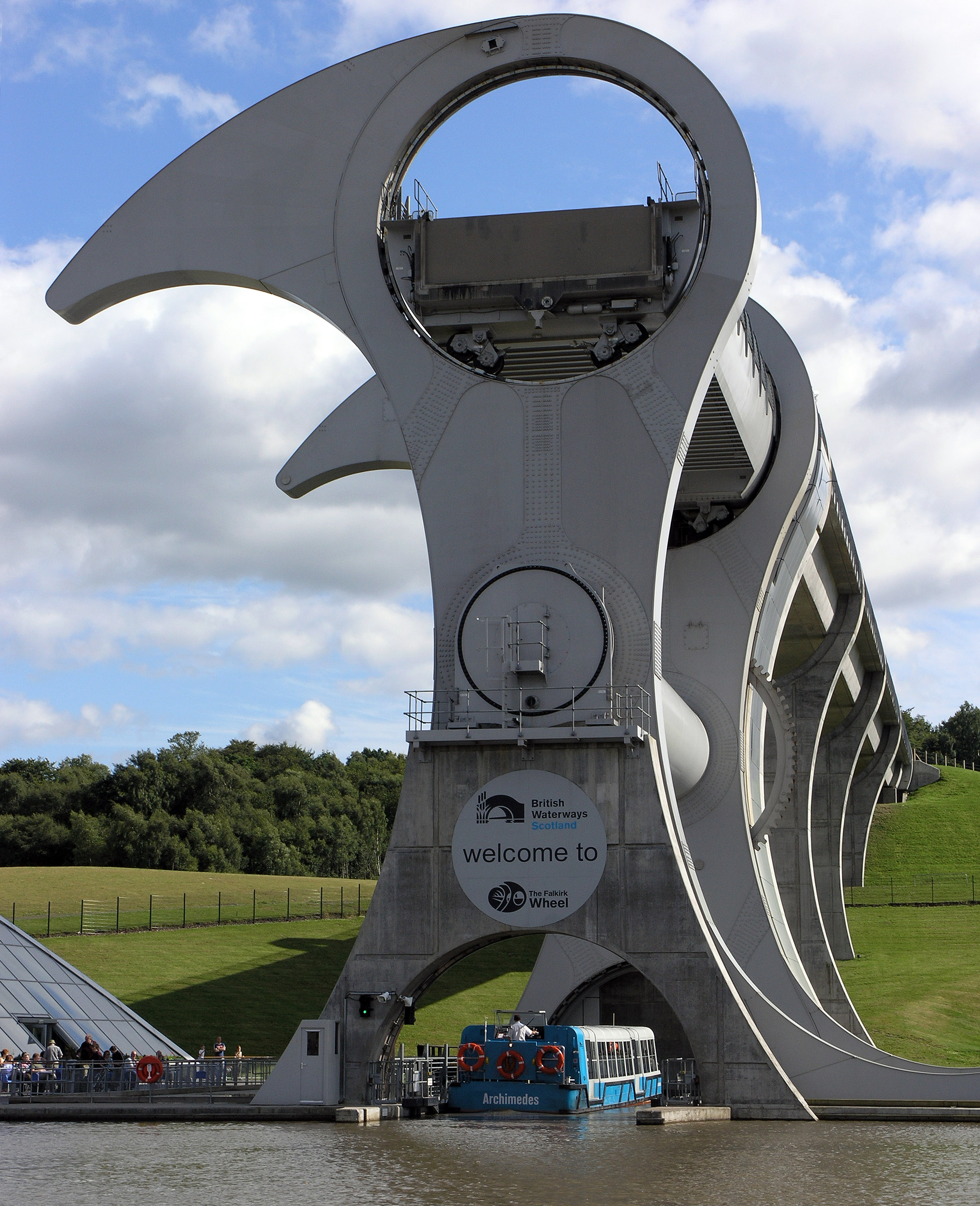
The Falkirk Wheel

Restoration projects by volunteer-led groups continue. There is now a substantial network of interconnecting, fully navigable canals across the country. In places, serious plans are in progress by the Environment Agency and the Canal & River Trust, for building new canals to expand the network, link isolated sections, and create new leisure opportunities for navigating "canal rings", for example the Fens Waterways Link and the Bedford and Milton Keynes Waterway. The Rochdale Canal, the Huddersfield Narrow Canal and the Droitwich Canals have all been restored to navigation since 2000.

== Geographic locations ==
The bulk of the canal system was built in the industrial Midlands and the north of England, where navigable rivers most needed extending and connecting, and heavy cargoes of manufactured goods, raw materials or coal most needed carrying. The great manufacturing cities of Manchester and Birmingham were major economic drivers. Most of the traffic on the canal network was internal. However, the network linked with coastal port cities such as London, Liverpool, and Bristol, where cargo could be exchanged with seagoing ships for import and export. In the 19th century, Manchester's merchants became dissatisfied with the poor service and high charges offered by the Liverpool docks, and the near-monopoly of the railways. They decided to bypass the Liverpool monopoly on coastal trade by converting a section of the Irwell into the Manchester Ship Canal, which opened in 1894, turning Manchester into an inland port in its own right.

The industrial revolution saw Yorkshire towns and cities such as Leeds, Sheffield and Bradford develop large textile and coal mining industries, which required an efficient transport system. As early as the late 17th century, the Aire and Calder and Calder and Hebble navigations had been canalised, allowing navigation from Leeds to the Humber Estuary, whereas the River Don Navigation connected Sheffield to the Humber. Later in the 18th century, the Leeds and Liverpool Canal was constructed, creating an east–west link, giving access to the port at Liverpool allowing export of finished goods.

London has a port, and as early as 1790 this was linked to the national network via the River Thames and the Oxford Canal. A more direct route between London and the national canal network, the Grand Junction Canal, opened in 1805. Relatively few canals were built in London itself.

South West England had several east–west cross-country canals, which connected the River Thames to the River Severn and the River Avon, allowing the cities of Bristol and Bath to be connected to London. These were the Thames and Severn Canal which linked to the Stroudwater Navigation, the Kennet and Avon Canal and the Wilts and Berks Canal, which linked to these three rivers.

Within Scotland, the Forth and Clyde Canal and the Union Canal connected the major cities in the industrial Central Belt; they also provide a short cut for boats to cross between the west and the east without a sea voyage. The Caledonian Canal provided a similar function in the Highlands of Scotland.

== Canal museums ==
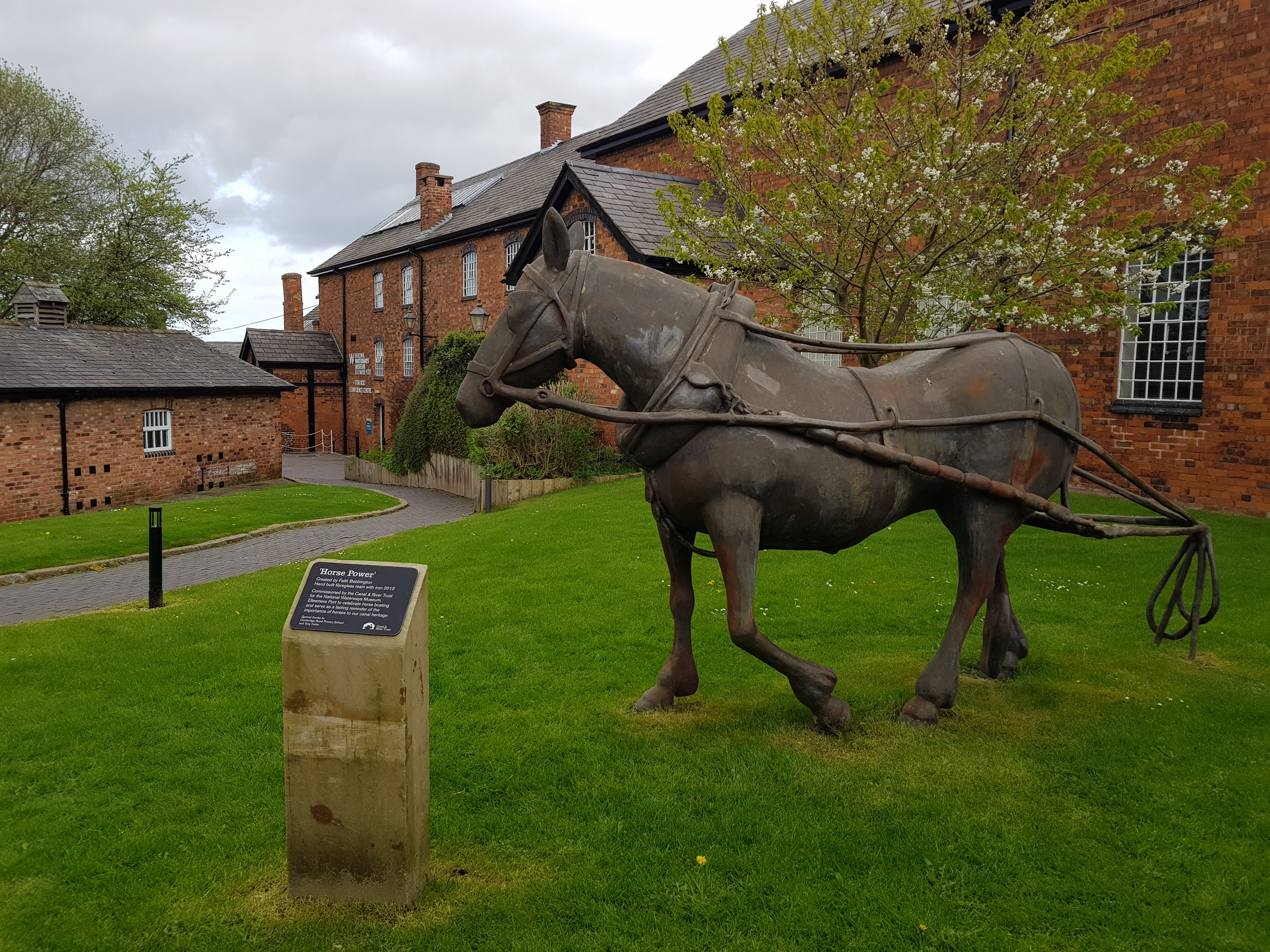
Horse Power exhibit at the National Waterways Museum

- National Waterways Museum, Ellesmere Port, Cheshire
- Foxton Canal Museum, Harborough, Leicestershire
- Galton Valley Canal Heritage Centre, Smethwick, West Midlands
- Gloucester Waterways Museum, Gloucestershire
- Kennet & Avon Canal Museum, Devizes, Wiltshire
- Linlithgow Canal Centre, Scotland
- Llangollen Canal Museum, North Wales
- London Canal Museum, Kings Cross, London
- Portland Basin Museum, Manchester
- Stoke Bruerne Canal Museum, Northamptonshire
- Tapton Lock Visitor Centre, Chesterfield
- Yorkshire Waterways Museum, Goole, East Yorkshire

== Canal archives ==
The Canals Collection at the Cadbury Research Library (University of Birmingham) contains archive materials relating to Midlands canals in the late eighteenth and early nineteenth centuries.

== See also ==
- Canals of the United Kingdom
- List of canals in Ireland
- Timeline of transportation technology
- List of canal tunnels in the United Kingdom
- List of canal aqueducts in the United Kingdom
- List of canal locks in the United Kingdom
- Roses and Castles

== Bibliography ==
- Broadbridge, S. R. (1974). The Birmingham Canal Navigations. Volume 1: 1768-1846. Newton Abbot: David & Charles. ISBN 0-7153-6381-6.
- Burton, Anthony (1995). The Great Days of the Canals. London: Tiger Books International. ISBN 1-85501-695-8.
- Burton, Anthony (1983). The Waterways of Britain: A Guide to the Canals and Rivers of England, Scotland and Wales. London: Willow Books, William Collins and Sons & Co Ltd. ISBN 0-00-218047-2.
- Deane, Phyllis (1965). The First Industrial Revolution. Cambridge University Press.
- Hadfield, Charles (1966). The Canals of the West Midlands. Newton Abbot: David & Charles. ISBN 0-7153-4660-1.
- Hadfield, Charles (1981). The Canal Age (Second ed.). David & Charles. ISBN 0-7153-8079-6.
- Palmer (chairman), Robert (1955). "Canals and Inland Waterways, Report of the Board of Survey". British Transport Commission.
- "Reader's Digest Library of Modern Knowledge". Reader's Digest. London. 1978.
- Rolt, L. T. C. (1944). Narrow Boat. London: Eyre Methuen. ISBN 0-413-22000-1.
- Rolt, L. T. C. (1950). The Inland waterways of England. London: George Allen and Unwin Ltd. ISBN 0-04-386003-6.
- Roger Squires (2008). Britain's restored canals. Landmark Publishing. ISBN 978-1-84306-331-5.
