= List of areas in the Metropolitan Borough of Solihull =

This is a list of areas in the Metropolitan Borough of Solihull, West Midlands, England.

- Balsall Common
- Barston
- Bentley Heath
- Berkswell
- Bickenhill
- Blossomfield
- Castle Bromwich
- Catherine-de-Barnes
- Chelmsley Wood
- Cheswick Green
- Coleshill Heath
- Copt Heath
- Cornets End
- Dickens Heath
- Dorridge
- Eastcote
- Elmdon
- Elmdon Heath
- Fen End
- Fordbridge
- Hampton-in-Arden
- Haslucks Green
- Hillfield
- Hobs Moat
- Hockley Heath
- Kineton Green
- Kingshurst
- Knowle
- Longdon
- Marston Green
- Meer End
- Meriden
- Monkspath
- Olton
- Sharmans Cross
- Shirley
- Smith's Wood
- Solihull
- Solihull Lodge
- Tidbury Green
- Ulverley Green
- Whitlocks End
- World's End
