= Earlswood (disambiguation) =

Earlswood a suburb of Redhill in Surrey, England.

Earlswood may also refer to:

- Earlswood, Monmouthshire, a settlement in Wales
- Earlswood, Warwickshire, a village in both Warwickshire and the West Midlands, England

== See also ==
- Earlswood Lakes
- Royal Earlswood Hospital
