= Wood End, North Warwickshire =

There are two places in North Warwickshire called Wood End

== Places ==
- Wood End, Atherstone - Near Kingsbury 52.58°N 01.64°W
- Wood End, Fillongley, - Near Fillongley 52.48°N 01.56°W

== See also ==
- Wood End (disambiguation)
