= Earlswood railway station =

Earlswood railway station may refer to:

- Earlswood railway station (Surrey), in Earlswood, Surrey, England
- Earlswood railway station (West Midlands), near Earlswood, West Midlands, England
