= Monkspath Hall =

- Interactive map of the Monkspath Hall area

General information
- Type: Country house
- Location: Monkspath, England
- Coordinates: 52.390408°N 1.801941°W
- Completed: Circa 1775
- Demolished: 1 December 1980

Technical details
- Floor count: 2

Design and construction
- Designations: Grade II listed

Monkspath Hall was a two-storey Georgian country house in Monkspath, historically in Tanworth-in-Arden, Warwickshire (since 1974 part of Solihull, in the West Midlands), England. It was built circa 1775, in red brick, and demolished illegally in 1980.

== History ==
In the 1870s, the house was home to W. S. Colmore, Esq. During World War II, the house was occupied, and the estate farmed, by Jack Bickford, who was injured when he picked up an incendiary bomb nearby, which went off in his hands.

== Demolition ==
Although the house was Grade II listed, in theory protecting it from unauthorised alteration, it was demolished on the afternoon of 1 December 1980 – a Sunday – by a bulldozer driver, who was supposed to be demolishing outbuildings on the opposite side of the road.

The then leader of the local council described the act as "sheer, stupid negligence".

== Court cases ==
Following a 1981 Crown Court trial, the demolition company responsible, D. Doyle Contractors, was fined £2,000. The driver, who was a director of the firm and who had been warned beforehand by a local resident that the building was listed, was fined £1,500.

In a separate, civil case brought by Solihull Borough Council in 1985, a Birmingham High Court judge, Mr. Justice McNeill, ordered that the cost of rebuilding the hall - estimated then to be in the order of £200,000 - using as much material from the demolition as possible, be borne by the contractor. He also awarded costs against the defendants, who had admitted their negligence.

== Legacy ==
The demolition was referenced in the House of Commons by John Heddle, MP for Lichfield and Tamworth, during a July 1981 debate on the Local Government and Planning (Amendment) Bill, as an "act of wilful vandalism" for which he said "imprisonment and punitive fines are the only reasonable remedy." Heddle described the actual fines issued in relation to the case as "derisory".

The rebuilt hall was delisted in 1990, and has been divided into apartments.
