= Lake Station (disambiguation) =

Lake Station may refer to:

== Places ==
- Lake Station, Indiana, United States
- Lake Station, Michigan, United States

== Transportation ==
- Lake station (CTA), Chicago, Illinois
- Lake station (Los Angeles Metro), California
- Lake railway station, Isle of Wight, England
- The Lakes railway station, Warwickshire, England
