= Hockley Heath =

Village in Solihull, West Midlands, England

Coordinates: 52.3559°N 1.7774°W

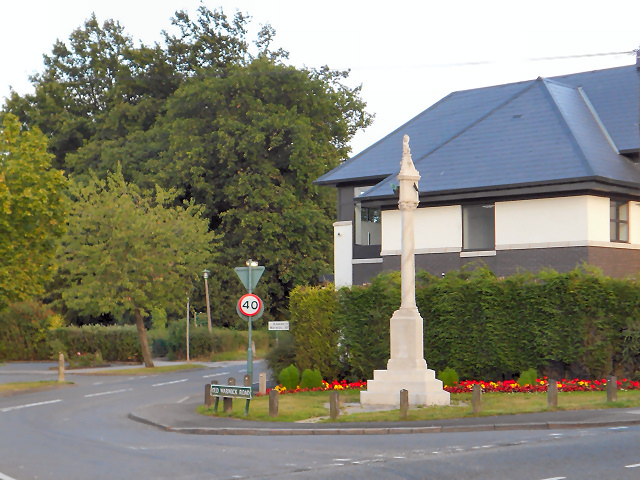
- The War memorial, Hockley Heath

- Location within the West Midlands
- Population: 2,038 (2011 Census)
  - London: 112 mi (180 km)
- Metropolitan borough: Solihull
- Metropolitan county: West Midlands
- Region: West Midlands
- Country: England
- Sovereign state: United Kingdom
- Post town: SOLIHULL
- Postcode district: B94
- Dialling code: 01564
- Police: West Midlands
- Fire: West Midlands
- Ambulance: West Midlands
- UK Parliament: Meriden
- Website: Parish Council

Hockley Heath is a village and civil parish within the Metropolitan Borough of Solihull, West Midlands, England. The village is to the south of the West Midlands conurbation, 12 miles (19 km) south-east of Birmingham 5.5 miles (8.9 km) from Solihull town centre and 13 miles (21 km) north of Stratford-upon-Avon. Hockley Heath is in the Arden area and borders Warwickshire and the District of Stratford-on-Avon to the south, with some parts of the village on either side of the border. It incorporates the hamlet of Nuthurst, and has a history dating back to the year 705 AD as a wood owned by Worcester Cathedral. The 2011 Census gives the population of Hockley Heath civil parish as 2,038. Today the village serves commuters to both London and Birmingham via local transport connections, and is the home of the Vintage Sports-Car Club.

== History ==
=== Nuthurst ===
The area known as Nuthurst derives its name from the Anglo Saxon Hnuthyrste, meaning Nut Wood, a woodland that covered what is now Nuthurst, along with the hamlet of Illshaw Heath, within the larger Forest of Arden.

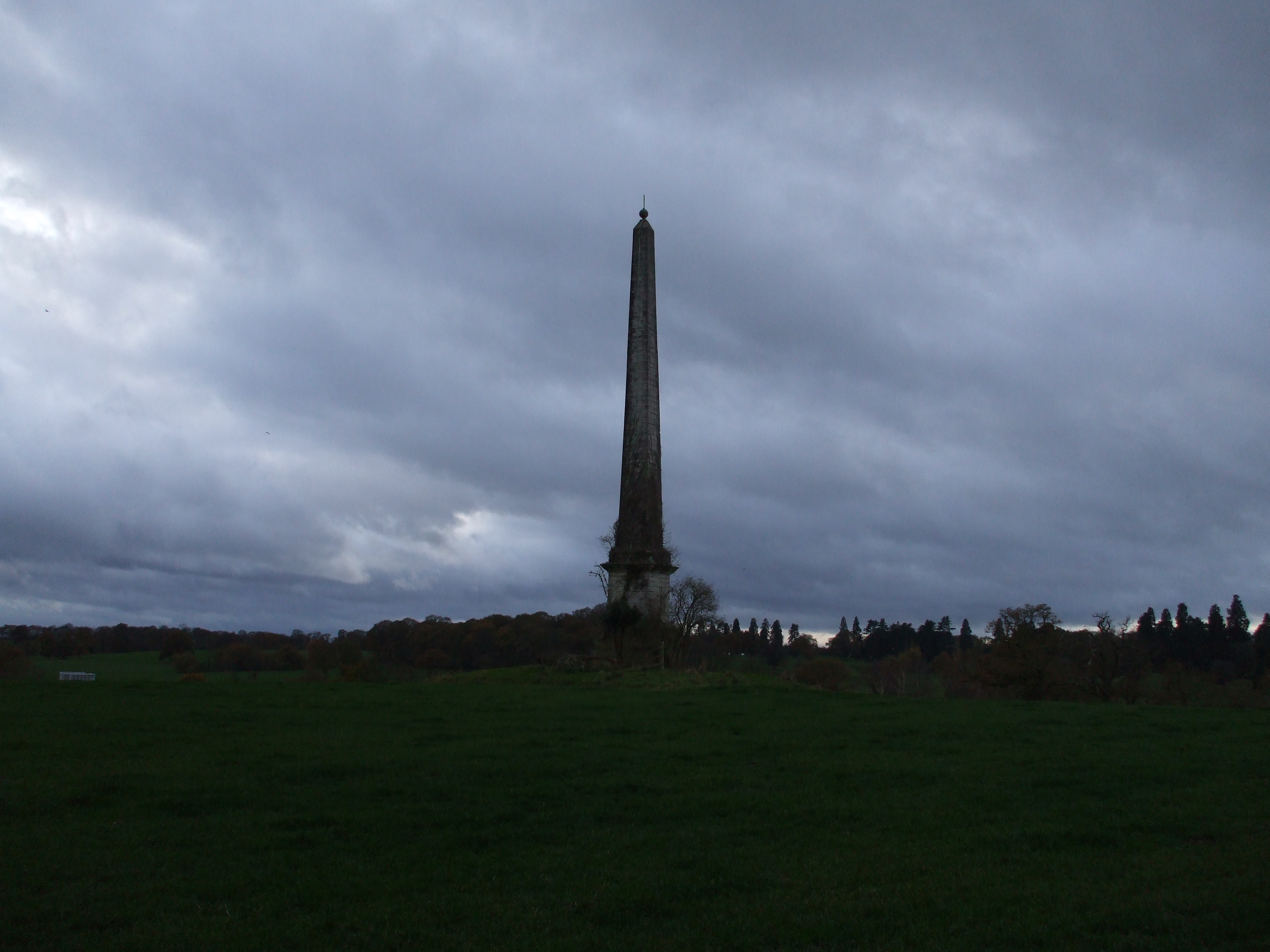
Lord Archer's Obelisk, Umberslade Park, Nuthurst

William Dugdale found no mention of a settlement before the reign of Henry III (1216–72) but it has been identified with the woodland 'aet Hnuthyrste' given with Shottery to Worcester Cathedral by Offa of Mercia c. 705. In 872 Werfryd, Bishop of Worcester, granted to Eanwulf, the Kings thane, land at Hnuthyrst for four lives, with reversion to the monastery of Stratford.

After the Norman Conquest the name usually appeared as Notehurst, but gradually reverted to its present and original spelling. It was part of Hampton-in-Arden, and 1/5 knight's fee in Nuthurst was held of Niel de Mowbray c. 1230 and of Roger de Mowbray in 1242. The overlordship descended in this family, being held by Roger de Mowbray at his death in 1297, and by John Mowbray, Duke of Norfolk, in 1432.

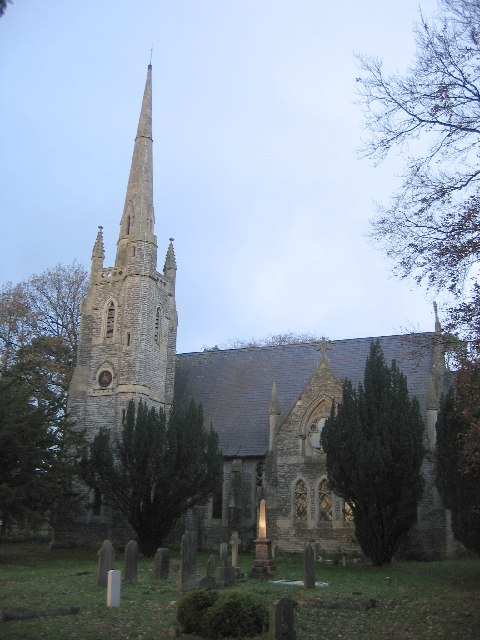
Umberslade Baptist Church, Nuthurst

The church at Nuthurst - at the time a curate chapel of Hampton in Arden - dates from at least 1216 and was dedicated to St Peter. A painting from 1820 shows the church in ruins and the only thing that remains of the church now is the graveyard and a ruined mortuary chapel dating from the 1800s. The church likely fell out of use because of the construction of the church of St Thomas in Hockley Heath, which was closer to the main road of the hamlet.

After the Mowbrays the manor passed to the Montforts, Hastings and then to the Trussells. It was Sir William Trussell, of Nuthurst who informed Edward II of his disposition in favour of his son. During the conflict against Edward II, Sir William Trussell found himself fighting the Despencer family, who were amongst their other titles, lords of the manor of nearby Solihull.

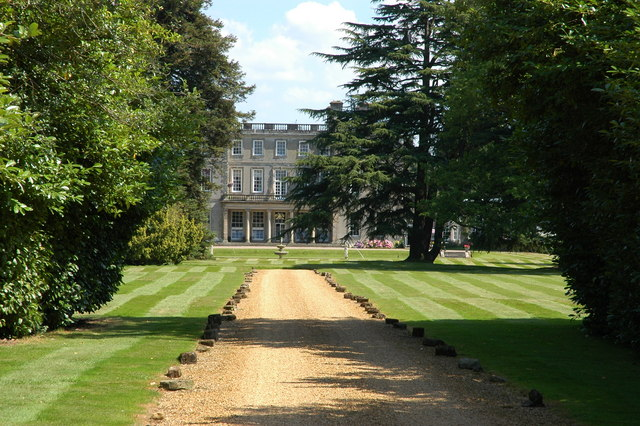
Umberslade Hall, Nuthurst

By the 18th century the manor had passed to the Archers of Umberslade Hall and the hamlet was briefly reoriented around its Umberslade area. The Umberslade estate sits on the border of Nuthurst and Tanworth in Arden and had been built for the Archer family in 1680. Lord Archer raised a 70 feet (21 m) limestone block obelisk on the estate in 1749. The reason for this is unclear, possibly to celebrate his elevation to the peerage or just, as was the fashion during that period, as a folly. However, according to local folklore it is said to mark the passing of a favoured horse, which is buried beneath it.

When local industrialist and politician, Mr G. F. Muntz became resident in Umberslade Hall he instigated the building of Umberslade Baptist church in Nuthurst and the adjoining Baptist school in 1876. The Baptist Church and Obelisk are now separated from Umberslade Hall by the M40 motorway to London, which controversially cuts through the Halls former grounds and the avenue of giant sequoiadendron which once marked the path between the two.

A country house called Nuthurst Grange was built in the settlement in 1882, once serving as home to Walter Higgs. It is now a luxury hotel and wedding venue.

The hamlet lies to the south of Hockley Heath, and borders Lapworth to the South East, and Tanworth-in-Arden to the southwest.

=== Hockley Heath ===
Hockley Heath first appeared in the 13th century. Originally the area north of Nuthurst was known as "Hocca's Hill" possibly named after a local Anglo Saxon chieftain or landowner. There are a number of other places across historic county Warwickshire with 'Hockley' in the name, including Hockley in the Jewellery Quarter, so it is possible that Hocca was an important landowner of the area. By 1280, Hockley Heath was known as "Huckeloweheath". By 1542, the single word was split and the village had become "Hokeley Heath". Due to its growth Hockley Heath eventually absorbed the settlement of Nuthurst at the south of the village.

By 1361 the Aylesbury family had settled in the area and constructed a large house called Aylesbury hall. The family were descended from the Aylesbury who represented Warwickshire in the parliament of Edward III.

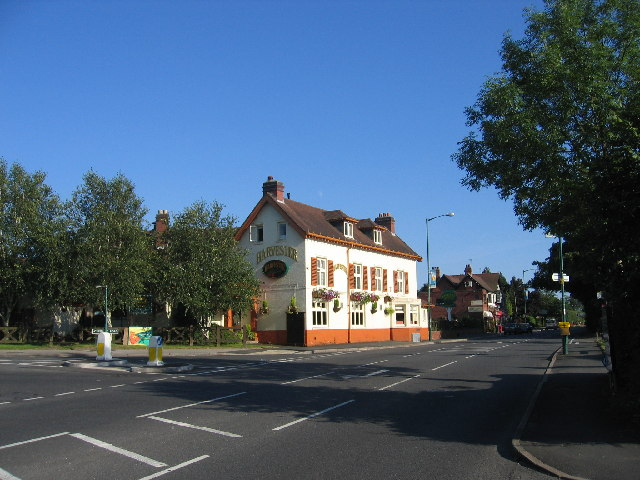
Hockley Heath - The Nags Head circa 2005

Hockley Heath was originally part of the ecclesiastic parish of Tanworth-in-Arden. The village owes its first stage of independent development to the roads that cross through it, specifically the Stratford Road and Old Warwick Road, which allowed for the transportation of post through from London to Birmingham and beyond. Because of its position on the road between Oxford and Solihull with road links out towards Warwick and Worcester, Hockley Heath became a central distribution point for postal deliveries over a wide area. Because of this the village became a staging post on the old mail coach road from London to Birmingham. A large property called Hockley House was turned over to become a high end coaching inn, with another coaching inn opposite called the Nags Head, where post horses were kept. Queen Victoria stayed at Hockley House in 1837 prior to taking the throne, possibly on her way to visit nearby Packwood House. Hockley House was demolished in 1968 and housing now sits on the site. The Nags Head is still in operation as a restaurant.

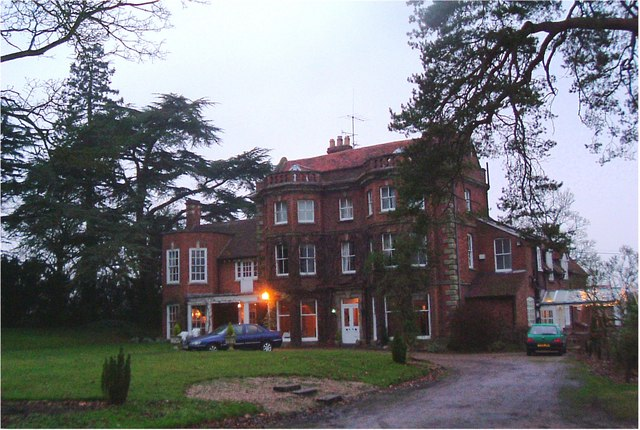
Aylesbury House Hotel

By the 1760s the Aylesbury family would own Box Trees farm in the north of the village, which now gives its name to the Box Trees area between the village and the Blythe Valley Park area. By the mid 1800s further construction had been undertaken on Aylesbury Hall, rechristened Aylesbury House and remaining home to the Aylesbury family. It later became a hotel. The Aylesbury family were also prominent in neighboring Packwood, and many artefacts of the family are now in Packwood House and St Giles Church Packwood. In 2016 Aylesbury house suffered a devastating fire which destroyed much of the interior following a suspected arson attack. The property had recently been sold to a housing developer, who converted the shell of the property into luxury apartments, and built several additional properties in the surrounding grounds.

As the canal network came to replace coach and horse transport, the Stratford-upon-Avon Canal was dug through the village in 1798 and a wharf built known as Hockley Port. The wharf supplied the surrounding area with commodities such as coal, stone, lime, bricks, salt and timber. Today the wharf is a public house. By 1850 the importance of canals died down as they were replaced by rail transport. The last commercial load was brought into the wharf on Christmas Eve, 1929. Hockley Heath did not receive a station and so residents had to use the nearby Dorridge railway station, Lapworth railway station, The Lakes railway station in Earlswood, or Whitlocks End railway station.

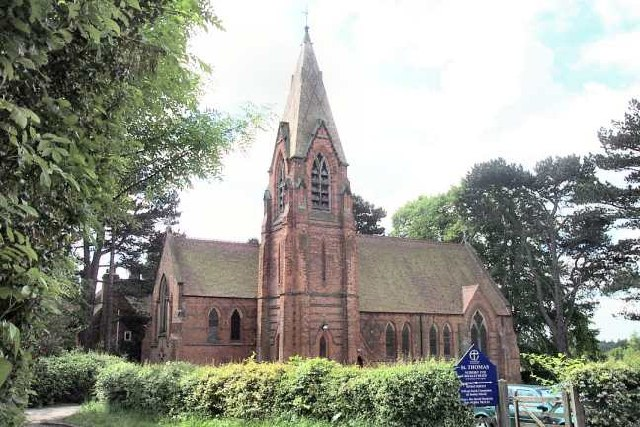
St. Thomas, Nuthurst-cum-Hockley-Heath Church

Until 1837, Hockley Heath had neither a church nor school. To remedy this, Umberslade resident and Whig MP for Warwick, Edward Bolton King, gave land for the building of a chapel on Orchard road and a school. The school building still stands on the end of School Road and is now used as an offices for John Shepherds estate agents. The Church of St Thomas was built in 1879.

In the 1850s the village bakery 'Wedges' would open, remaining in the same family until 2013.

Local industrialist and politician, Mr G. F. Muntz instigated the building of the village institute in 1892, later renamed King George VI Memorial Hall.

In 1913, the old school was closed and a new council school was built for 120 pupils from the old school and now closed Baptist school. The school is now Hockley Heath Primary Academy.

The village was attacked during the First World War when Zeppelin L 62 bombed the village during an attempted raid on Birmingham but heavy anti-aircraft fire prevented the airship from getting near the city centre.

The sporting life of the village increased in the 1920s with the acquisition of land for recreation. This was due to the enterprise and generosity of Mr Harry Mould of Hockley House and grants from Warwickshire and National Playing Fields Associations, Carnegie trustees and by money raising events. Several hundred pounds was raised by Mr Mould, who acquired a Rhode car, value £235, and took it around the country inviting people to subscribe one shilling to the Recreation Ground Fund. The car was raffled at a concert held at the institute on 3 November 1923

During the Second World War, the village had an air station called RAF Hockley Heath. The station opened in 1941 and closed in 1948. The airfield was situated on the Stratford Road opposite Box Trees farm. The former RAF site is currently used for farming.

In 1978, the Memorial Hall was modernized.

Due to its rural location, until at least 1998 the village had its own policeman who resided in the Police House near to the Nags Head. The house had a small office for the police officer to use as a base.

In the north of the village Box Trees farm is now an Arts and Craft Centre.

Today the village is an affluent commuter village for those working in Solihull town centre, Stratford Upon Avon, and other surrounding larger towns and cities. The village still has four public houses/restaurants, a parade of shops, a petrol station, a village hall, recreation ground, a luxury hotel, a number of footpaths, and a Rolls-Royce and McLaren showroom. There is a cycle route to the nearby Blythe Valley Business Park. The village has the hamlet of Nuthurst in the south, and borders Dorridge and Packwood to the North East, and Illshaw Heath and Earlswood to the North West.

== Governance ==
Until 1 April 2009, as well as Hockley Heath village, the parish included Cheswick Green, Dickens Heath, Tidbury Green, Salter Street, and Whitlock's End. According to the 2001 census, the parish had a population of 6,771. However following a community governance review, on 31 March 2009 the former Hockley Heath Parish Council was abolished and on 1 April 2009 four new parish councils were created: Hockley Heath (including Nuthurst), Cheswick Green, Dickens Heath (including Whitlock's End) and Tidbury Green. The new parishes follow the old ward boundaries for the Hockley Heath Parish and each parish now has a parish council.

Hockley Heath is part of the Dorridge and Hockley Heath ward of Solihull Metropolitan Borough Council and is represented by Mayor Ian Courts and Councillors Andrew Mackiewicz and Ken Meeson all of the Conservative party. Nationally, it is part of the constituency of Meriden whose Member of Parliament since 2019 is Saqib Bhatti of the Conservative party. Prior to Brexit in 2020, it was included in the West Midlands electoral region of the European Parliament.

Most of Hockley Heath is on a salient of the West Midands County and therefore is covered by the West Midlands Combined Authority, a strategic authority with powers over transport, economic development and regeneration. Residents can vote in elections for the Mayor of the West Midlands and the West Midlands Police and Crime Commissioner.

== Notable landmarks ==
The ruined Mortuary Chapel of the now demolished St Peter's Church in Nuthurst, and its graveyard, lies on land next to the M40 motorway.

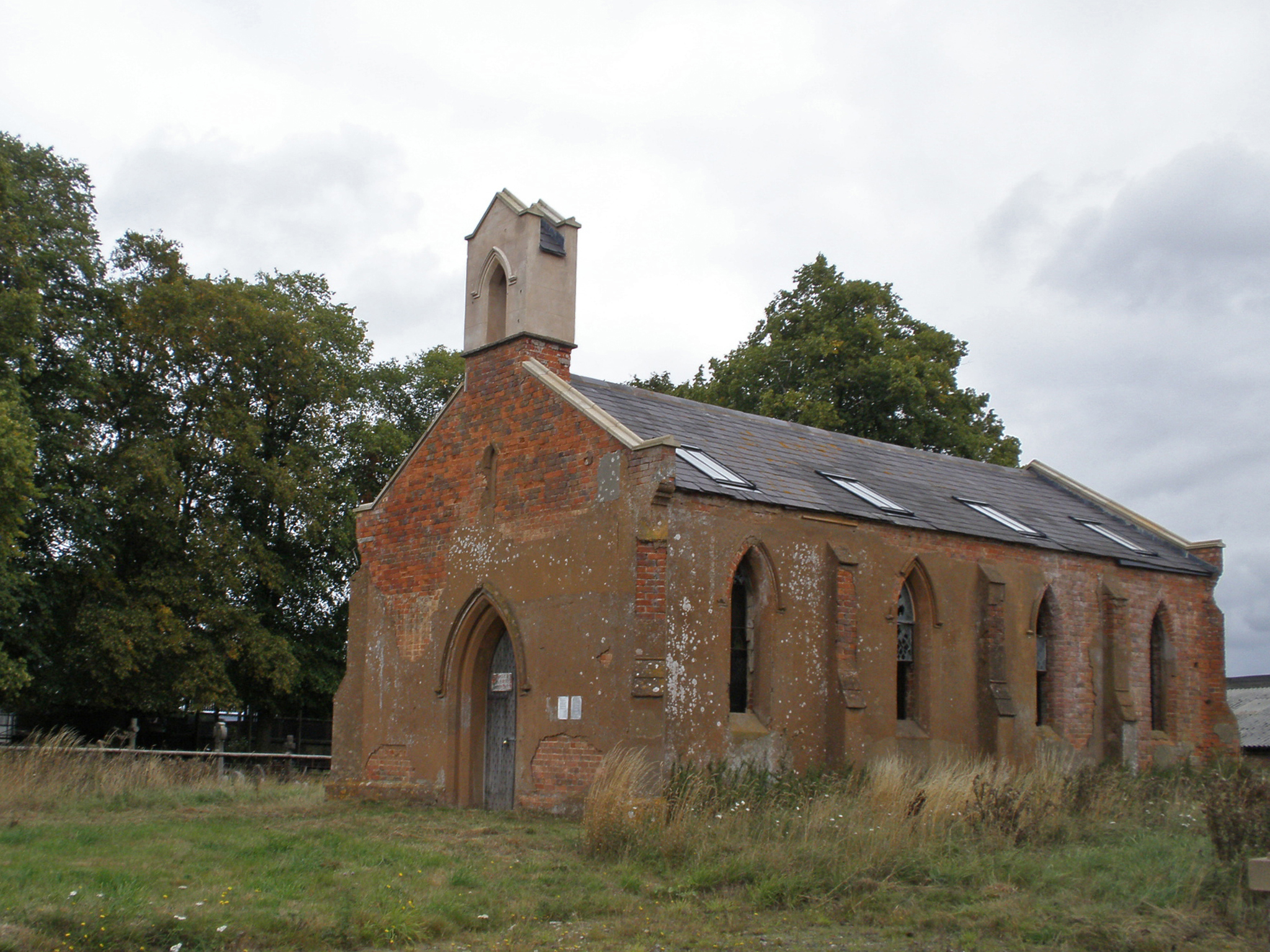
The ruins of the Mortuary Chapel at St Peter's Nuthurst

Nuthurst also has a second, now redundant church called Umberslade Baptist Church. The church was commissioned by George Frederick Muntz junior, the son of George Muntz, the industrialist and MP for Birmingham. It was designed by the Birmingham architect George Ingall and building was completed in 1877 in Umberslade Park, the estate of Umberslade Hall, Muntz's country seat.

The ecclesiastical parish of Nuthurst cum Hockley Heath was formed in 1878 with the addition of the modern village of Hockley Heath from Tanworth. It lies for the most part between two roads from Henley-in-Arden to Birmingham which meet in the extreme north of the civil parish, where the church of St. Thomas, designed by John Cotton, a red-brick structure in the Early English style, was built in 1879 and consecrated on 30 June 1880, having cost £2,500. It was dedicated to St Thomas, as a compliment to Thomas Burman, of Warings Green, who, as the chief subscriber, laid the foundation stone in 1879.

Situated at the junction of the A3400 Stratford on Avon to Birmingham Road and the B4439, known as the Old Warwick Road is the War Memorial to those killed during the two World Wars.

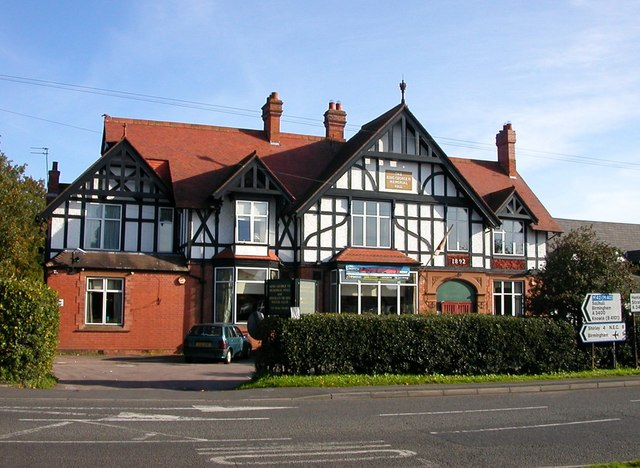
The Hockley Heath Village Hall

The village is served by a number of pubs and restaurants, notably the Wharf Tavern. It underwent an extensive refurbishment in December 2019. The majority of pubs and restaurants are situated on the Stratford road, and make up the Hockley Heath Mile, a Pub Crawl beginning at Hockley House (formerly the Oak) and ending at the Barn. The core of the Barn is an older listed building, which has been subject to claims of 'haunting', with newer additions built around it, many added after a fire in 1998.

There is a road called Cut Throat Lane out towards Earlswood, which despite local rumors involving an 18th century highway man, is likely a corruption of "Cut Through Lane".

The Hockley Heath Recreation Ground is situated on the Old Warwick Road. It has a children's play area, a multi-use games area and 2 full-size football pitches. One of these pitches was formerly a cricket pitch, while tennis courts were adjoined by the bowls club, however when the council ceased to maintain them they were taken down, and the village cricket team left the village. In 2014 a new BMX track was built, funded by the village fete committee. The recreation ground is used for major village events such as the village fete, Bonfire Night and Proms in the Park. There is also a Pavilion which is used by local community groups such as the church, beavers, cubs, scouts, an under 3s club and local football teams. The venue is managed by the Parish Clerk.

There are a number of listed buildings in and around Hockley Heath and Nuthurst, including Box Trees farmhouse.

== Transport links ==
The village is situated on the main A3400 Birmingham to Stratford Road, 2.5 miles (4.0 km) south of junction 4 of the M42 motorway affording links to London and other major cities, whilst 2 miles (3.2 km) south of the village there is a junction off the southbound carriageway of the M40 motorway.

The village is on the route of bus services X20 which runs between Solihull and Stratford-upon-Avon. Additionally service A7/A8 links the village to Solihull via Dorridge. Dorridge Station is the nearest railway station to the village at 2 miles (3.2 km) away with local connections to Solihull, Birmingham and Warwick and main line connections to London Marylebone on Chiltern Railways.

Nearby villages include Earlswood, Lapworth, Kingswood, Baddesley Clinton, Tanworth-in-Arden and the large village of Dorridge.

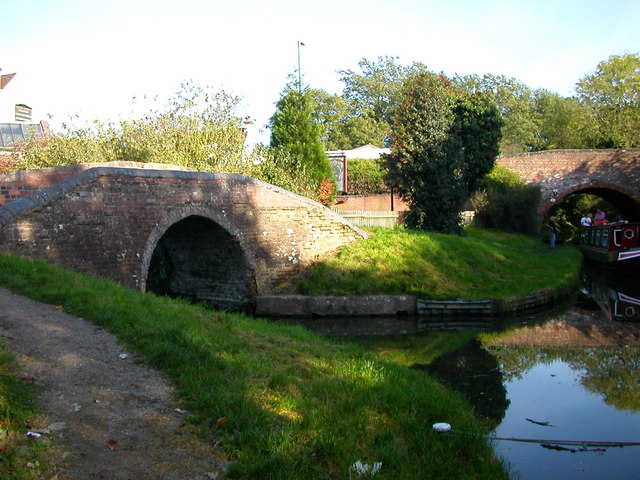
Bridges at the former wharf in Hockley Heath

The Stratford-upon-Avon Canal runs through the village and Hockley Heath Wharf, situated to the rear of The Wharf Public house, meant it became one the Arden villages which later became a convenient stopping off point for users of the canal. The canal, which runs from Kings Norton, was navigable as far as Hockley Heath by 1798, the remaining link to Stratford being opened by 1816. Hockley Wharf served the surrounding area and non-perishable goods were unloaded there, including timber, lime, coke, coal, cement, bricks and salt. The last commercial load was brought into the wharf on Christmas Eve, 1929.

The village was formed as a horse changing point on the 25-mile journey between Birmingham and Stratford-upon-Avon. A public house once called "The Nag's Head" still stands next to the place where the stables are thought to have once stood.

== Education ==
Hockley Heath Primary Academy is situated on School Road, Hockley Heath, Solihull, West Midlands, B94 6RA

School	Compulsory education stage	School website	Ofsted details
Hockley Heath Primary School	Primary	http://www.hockley-heath.solihull.sch.uk/	Ofsted details for unique reference number 104064

In 2020, The Real Schools Guide ranked Hockley Heath Primary Academy as the 9th best primary school in Solihull.

Local secondary schools include Tudor Grange Academy Solihull, Arden Academy, Henley-in-Arden School and St. Peter's Catholic School.

== Sport ==
The village has a local youth football club named Hockley Heath Football Club. The club was founded in September 2011 and as of 2020 has teams across eight age groups from under 6 to under 13. The teams play matches at the Hockley Heath Recreation ground. The club badge contains the notable local landmark, the War Memorial.

There is an adults Sunday league football team called Hockley Heath Dynamos. Racing Blythe Football club also play their matches at the recreation ground. The Hockley Heath Bowling club play their matches at the bowling green on the recreation ground.

There is also a Hockley Heath Cricket Club established in 1888.
