= Wood End =

Wood End may refer to:

== United Kingdom ==
- Wood End, Bedfordshire - Bedfordshire 52.11°N 00.54°W TL0004
- Wood End, Berkshire - Berkshire 51.42°N 00.67°W SU9270
- Wood End, Buckinghamshire - Buckinghamshire 51.96°N 00.85°W SP7930
- Wood End, Oldham - Greater Manchester 53.57°N 02.10°W SD9309
- Wood End, Tameside - Greater Manchester 53.51°N 02.04°W SD9702
- Wood End, Herefordshire - Herefordshire 52.06°N 02.54°W SO6341
- Wood End, Hertfordshire - Hertfordshire 51.90°N 00.08°W TL3225
- Wood End (ward), Hillingdon, Greater London
- Wood End, Hillingdon - Greater London
- Wood End, Hayes - Greater London
- Wood End, Hampshire
- Wood End, Atherstone - Warwickshire 52.58°N 01.64°W SP2498
- Wood End, Fillongley - Warwickshire 52.48°N 01.56°W SP2988
- Wood End, Stratford-on-Avon - Warwickshire 52.33°N 01.84°W SP1071
- Wood End, Coventry - West Midlands 52.44°N 01.46°W SP3682, a district of Coventry
- Wood End, Wolverhampton - West Midlands 52.60°N 02.09°W SJ9401

== United States ==
- Wood End, Massachusetts - a former village of Provincetown, Massachusetts 42.021°N 70.194°W
- Wood End Light - A lighthouse, also in Provincetown 42.02123°N 70.19350°W

== Other uses ==
- Wood End Museum, in Scarborough, North Yorkshire

== See also ==
- Woodend (disambiguation)
