= Lounge (company) =

British underwear company

- Established: 2015
- Headquarters: Solihull
- Location: United Kingdom
- Owners: Melanie Marsden; Daniel Marsden
- Website: lounge.com

Lounge is a British underwear brand founded in 2015 by Daniel and Melanie Marsden. The company is headquartered in Solihull, England.

== History ==
The Marsdens started Lounge with £1,000. They ran a fishing tackle e-commerce business before founding Lounge. Their first product was a "triangle" underwear set. It was created by sourcing components individually and assembling them in small batches. The first 100 sets were cut at a family home and sewn in Bulgaria. The founders packed and shipped orders and promoted via Instagram.

Lounge amassed 3.4 million Instagram followers by 2023. The brand's posts used unretouched imagery and models of varied body types and skin tones. Although its products were manufactured in China, the company diversified its supply chain in 2020 and now manufactures its garments in Bangladesh, Cambodia and Vietnam. It ships its orders from Solihull.

The founders reported turnover of £55 million in 2021, up from £13.8 million the year before.

In 2021, Lounge moved their headquarters to the Blythe Valley Park.

By June 2023, sales reached £68.5 million, with compound annual growth of 70.45 per cent over three years.

The company remains privately owned with no external investment.

The founders also launched the Lounge Foundation.
