= Longdon, Solihull =

District in the West Midlands, England

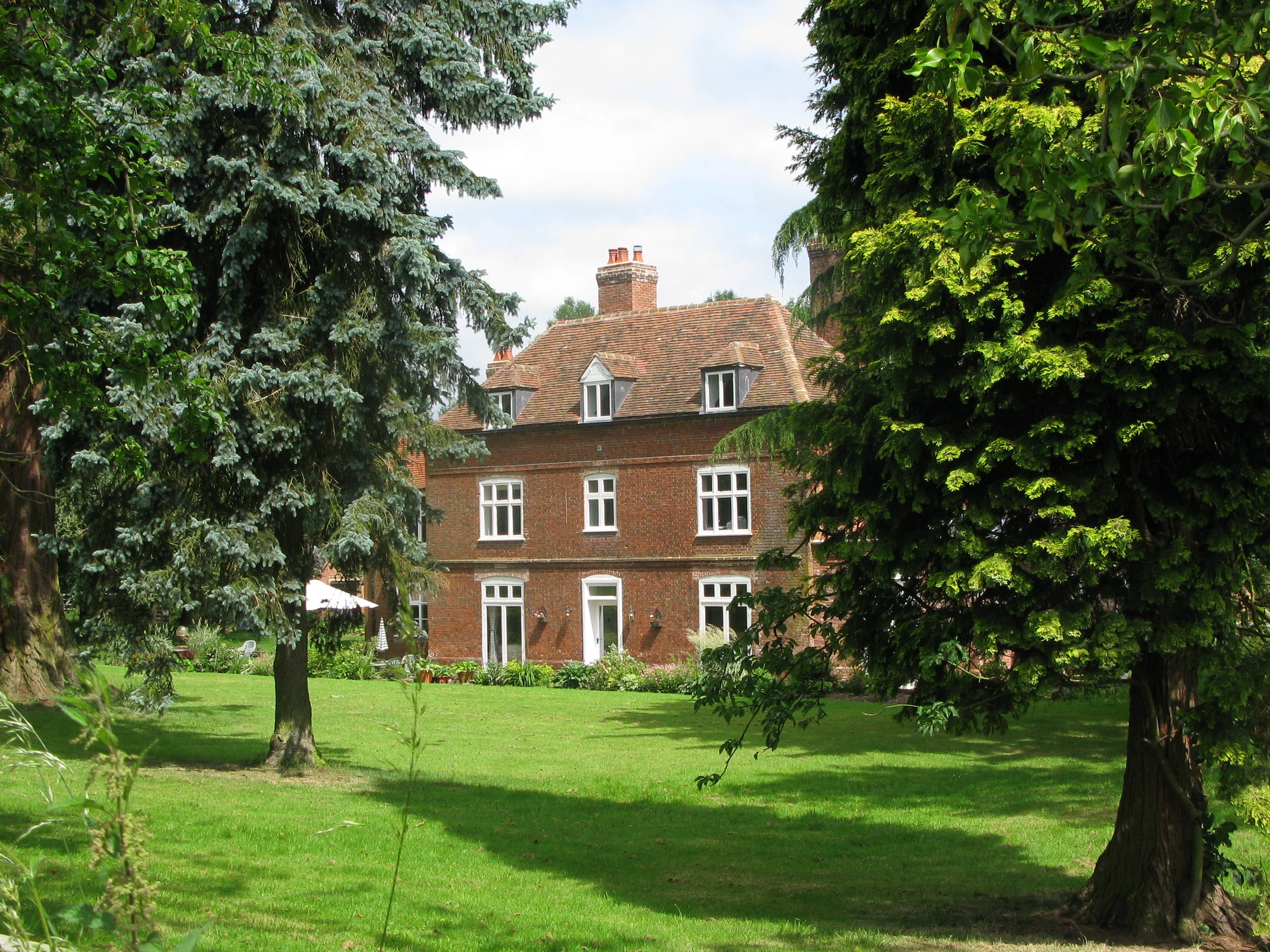
The new Longdon Hall

Longdon is a district of Solihull, in the West Midlands, England. Located in the east of the town, it was historically a distinct settlement that pre-dated the planted borough of Solihull, but is now mostly contiguous with Solihull town center.

== History ==
Longdon was once a clearing in the Forest of Arden with strips of land cleared and farmed in common. The first record of Longdon was as Langedone, meaning 'long hill' in 1086. The long hill is now Solihull's Marsh Lane and Yew Tree Lane, leading from the River Blythe up onto Elmdon Heath. The Manor's seat, Longdon Hall, was at its southern fringe on Copt Heath next to the settlement of Knowle. The manor bordered onto Knowle (then itself part of the Manor of Hampton in Arden), with Purnell's Brook (in Saxon times the Merebroc) acting as the boundary brook between the Knowle and Longdon manors, and later the parish boundary.

Alwin of Arden, nephew of Leofric, Earl of Mercia, had held the manor before the Norman Conquest and passed it to his son Thorkell of Arden. Thorkell passed it to his own son Siward de Arden. After Siward the manor passed to Ketelbern de Langdon.

Ketelbern founded Henwood Priory and gave his name to the settlement of Catherine-de-Barnes in Longdon (Catherine being a corruption of Ketlebern).

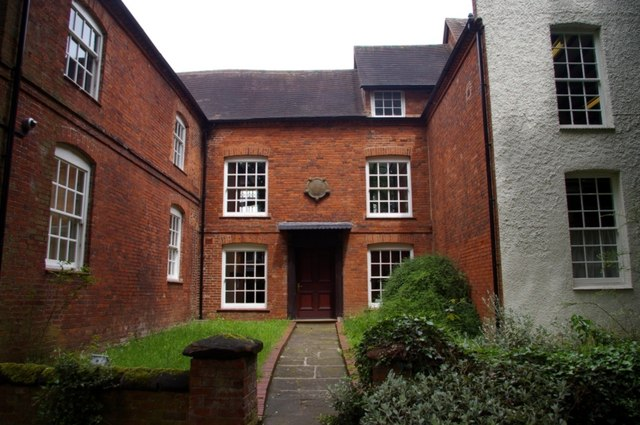
Malvern House - Former site of Solihull School

After the founding of Solihull as a planted borough between 1170 and 1180, the new settlement of Solihull began to subsume the settlement at Longdon.

At some stage the manor of Longdon came into the possession of Edward I.

Another settlement known as Copt Heath, which borders Knowle, is believed to take its name from Roger de la Coppe from 1247.

In the Western boundary of the manor was a farm called Malvern, belonging to Simon de Malverne, believed to be of Malvern in Worcestershire. It is recorded that Simon was assassinated in 1317. A moated site opposite the end of Marsh Lane is believed to be the de Malvern former home.

In 1371 Widney Manor was considered a sub manor of Longdon.

By the Elizabethan era the manor of Longdon had passed to the Greswolde family of Solihull, who had lived in Lime Tree House in Solihull (now erroneously known as the Manor House as no Lord of the manor ever lived there). John Greswolde's daughter Alice married Thomas Dabridgecourt and the manor passed with her to him.

The Malvern area of Longdon had been the property of Parliamentarian commander Robert Greville. The Greville family remained important to the area, with Fulke Greville, 5th Baron Brooke being erroneously recorded as the Lord of the manor of Longdon in 1682.

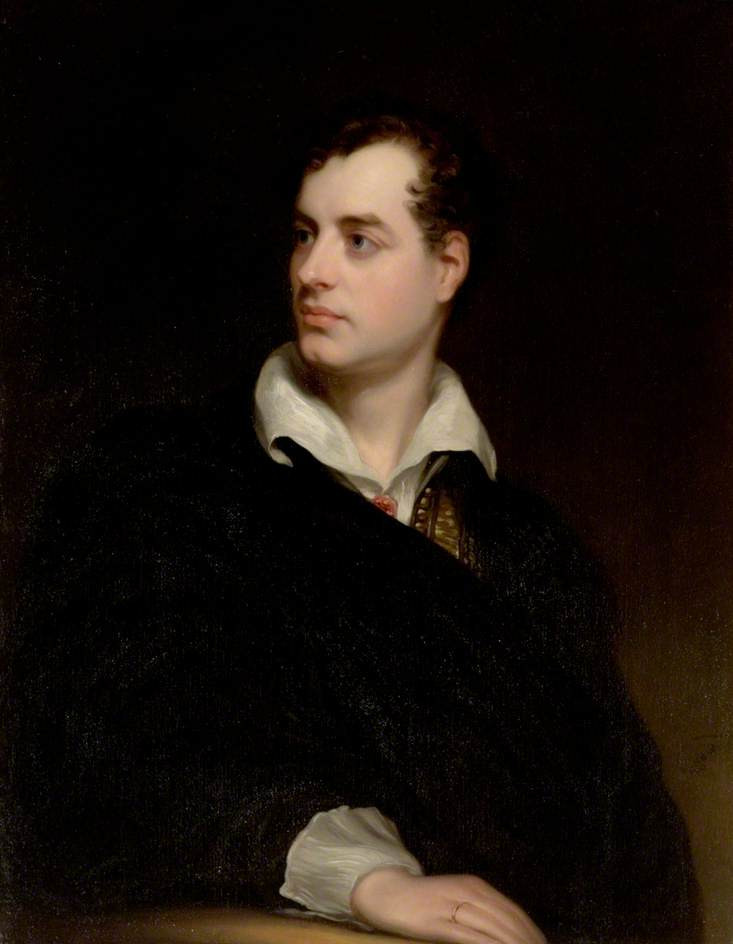
Portrait of Lord Byron by Thomas Phillips. Byron was Lord of the manor of Longdon via his marriage

The Greswolde's remained in Longdon after the loss of the manor. In 1680 the Rev. Henry Greswolde, then rector of Solihull, bought Malvern Farm, in Longdon Manor, to establish a new family seat, which would be called Malvern Hall.

Opposite Malvern Hall to the rear is another Grade II listed property called Malvern House dating from the mid 17th century. This building was once home to Solihull School until they moved to their present site in 1882, and it is today used as offices.

In the 17th century the old Longdon Hall was demolished and a new Longdon Hall constructed. By this point in history the integration of the settlement of Longdon into the larger settlement of Solihull was complete.

The manor of Longdon came to famous poet Lord Byron in 1815 by his marriage with Anne, daughter of Sir Ralph Milbanke Noel, and on her death in 1860 passed to her grandson the Earl of Lovelace. Two roads in Solihull are named after the family, Lady Byron Lane and Lovelace Avenue. Longdon Hall, with its remaining manorial rights, was later bought by a solicitor, Mr. J. B. Clarke of Birmingham in 1899 and soon afterwards sold to Mr. Alfred Lovekin, a silversmith.

In the 1980s ownership of Longdon Hall passed to the adjacent Golf Club, known as Copt Heath Golf Club. The Hall was later sold privately in 2011. It is Grade II listed.

== Geography ==
The Longdon area covers Malvern and Brueton Parks in Solihull town center, as well as the villages of Catherine-de-Barnes and the hamlet of Copt Heath.

== Transport ==
Longdon is split in half by the M42 motorway, and is served by junction 5. The Grand Union Canal passes through the Longdon area and is served by Copt Heath wharf.
