= Woodend =

Woodend may refer to:

== Australia ==
- Woodend, Victoria
  - Woodend railway station, Victoria
- Woodend, Queensland, a suburb in the City of Ipswich
- Woodend, New South Wales

== New Zealand ==
- Woodend, New Zealand

== United Kingdom ==
=== England ===
- Woodend, Egremont, Cumbria
- Woodend, Ulpha, Cumbria
- Woodend, Northamptonshire
- Woodend Gallery and Studios, Scarborough, North Yorkshire

=== Scotland ===
- Woodend, Aberdeen, a western suburb of Aberdeen, location of Woodend Hospital

== United States ==
- Woodend (Chevy Chase, Maryland)

== See also ==
- George Woodend (1917–1980), American baseball player
- Wood End (disambiguation)
