= Ladbrooke, Tanworth-in-Arden =

Historic estate in Warwickshire, England

Coordinates: 52°20′37″N 1°51′11″W

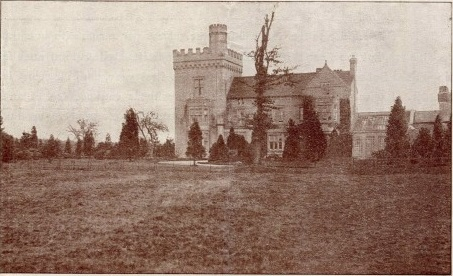
Ladbrooke Hall (or Ladbrooke Park) in 1908, then the residence of Oscar Bowen (1865-1916), viewed from south, surviving today as two dwellings known as Ladbrooke Hall East and West; the ancient moat, now surrounded by the golf course, is situated 320 metres to the east (right)

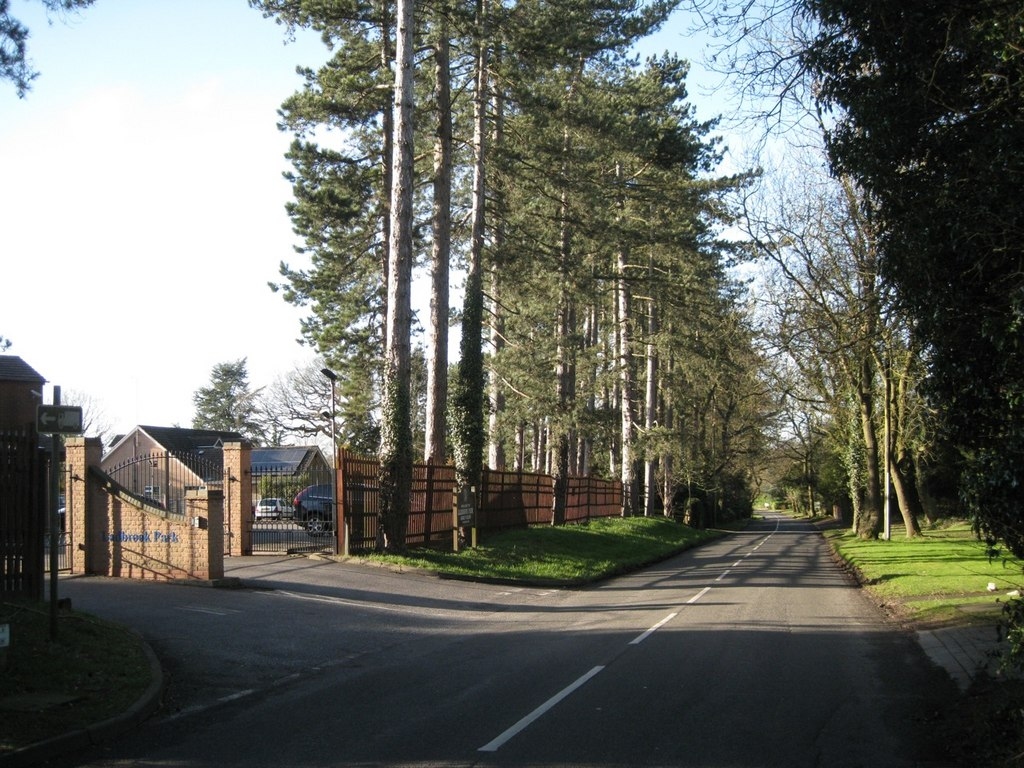
Entrance to Ladbrook Park Golf Club, the grounds of which cover the site of the medieval manor house of Ladbrooke and its moat

Ladbrooke is an historic estate in the parish of Tanworth-in-Arden, Warwickshire, England. The early history until the late 14th century is sparse and inextricably confused (even in the authoritative Victoria County History) with the manor and parish of Ladbroke near Southam in Warwickshire, 34 km to the south-east. The confusion arises not only because both places within the same county are spelled variously and identically in historic documents, but mainly because the mediaeval de Lodbroke family appear to have held estates in each place. The 1619 Heraldic Visitation of Warwickshire which gives the pedigree of the "de Lodbroke" family, states them as "Dominus de Lodbrooke" (lord of the manor of Lodbrooke) and makes no mention of Tanworth-in-Arden. The Victoria County History is however clear that the seat of the de Lodbroke family was Ladbroke near Southam and not Ladbrooke in the parish of Tanworth-in-Arden.

== History ==
The site of a mediaeval square moat survives at Ladbrooke in the parish of Tanworth-in-Arden, which suggests the presence of a high-status house, the occupying family of which is unclear. The moat site is situated 1.8 km north-west of St Mary Magdalene's Church, Tanworth-in-Arden, and although shown on the 2020 Ordnance Survey map, has been filled in so no visible trace survives. Much of the historic estate or deer park is today occupied by Ladbrook Park golf club, founded in 1908. However a manor house survives in a Victorian form, known as "Ladbrooke Hall", situated 320 metres to the west of the ancient moat, now converted into two dwellings known as Ladbrooke Hall East and West.

The earliest certain owner of Ladbrooke in the parish of Tanworth-in-Arden was Thomas de Beauchamp, 12th Earl of Warwick (1338-1401) of Warwick Castle, the major landowner in the county, who on his death in 1401 "was holding jointly with Margaret his wife the manor of Ladbrooks in Tanworth". On the downfall of the Earls of Warwick it escheated to the crown and in 1544 was acquired (as "Lodbrokes Park") by Sir George Throckmorton (c.1489-1552) of Coughton Court in Warwickshire (13 km to the south), when it comprised 288 acres. In 1571 the deer park was stated to be 2 miles in circuit, replenished with roes, furnished with a great number of timber trees, and hath also two springe woodes or coppices containing by estimacon about 40 acres.

The estate eventually passed to the ownership of the Archer family, seated at nearby Umberslade Hall in Warwickshire (3.8 km to the east) since the reign of King Henry II (1154-1189). On the death of Andrew Archer, 2nd Baron Archer (1736–1778) without male issue, but leaving four daughters and co-heiresses, Ladbrooke (together with Umberslade, Clay Hall and Codbarrow) became the inheritance of his eldest daughter Sarah Archer (1762–1838), wife successively of Other Windsor, 5th Earl of Plymouth (1751-1799) and William Amherst, 1st Earl Amherst (1773-1857). In 1890 her descendant William Amherst, 3rd Earl Amherst (1836-1910), sold "Ladbrooke Park" to Mrs Bowen of Moss Side, who made it the residence of her son Oscar Bowen (1865-1916), born in Manchester and formerly of Haseley Hall, near Warwick. In 1886 he married Beatrice Mary Heald and lived as a "gentleman farmer" at Ladbrooke. He was Chairman of the short-lived North Warwickshire Railway Company established in 1894, which failed to raise sufficient capital to build a proposed line from Stratford-Upon-Avon to Birmingham (passing the east side of the Ladbrooke estate), and was taken over by the Great Western Railway. He established the surviving 138 acre golf club on his estate in 1908.

Oscar Bowen was a man fond of humour and recorded his occupation on the 1911 census as "playing golf and obeying the baby", which was deleted by the enumerator and replaced with "private means". Likewise he listed the occupation of his 14-year-old son Eric as "studying for something not settled", his 16-year-old daughter Gwendoline as "helping mother (sometimes)". In World War I he enlisted as a private with the 3rd Battalion Warwickshire Volunteer Regiment. In 1916 whilst on night duty guarding a munitions factory he caught a chill from which he died, and was buried with full military honours at Tanworth-in-Arden Church, and is recorded on the Tanworth-in-Arden war memorial.
