= Earlswood, Warwickshire =

Village in Warwickshire & W. Midlands, England

Coordinates: 52.364°N 1.835°W

Earlswood is a village split between the counties of Warwickshire and the West Midlands in England. Most of the village is located in the Tanworth-in-Arden civil parish of the Stratford-on-Avon District, Warwickshire, while the northern part is in the Tidbury Green parish in the Metropolitan Borough of Solihull. A hamlet called Warings Green lies to the south east of the village, with the northernmost point crossing into the parish of Cheswick Green in the borough of Solihull. The village is surrounded by farmland and forests and it gives its name to Earlswood Lakes (entirely within Warwickshire) as well as to Earlswood railway station (on the border with West Midlands), even though The Lakes railway station is located closer to the main part of the village.

== Amenities ==
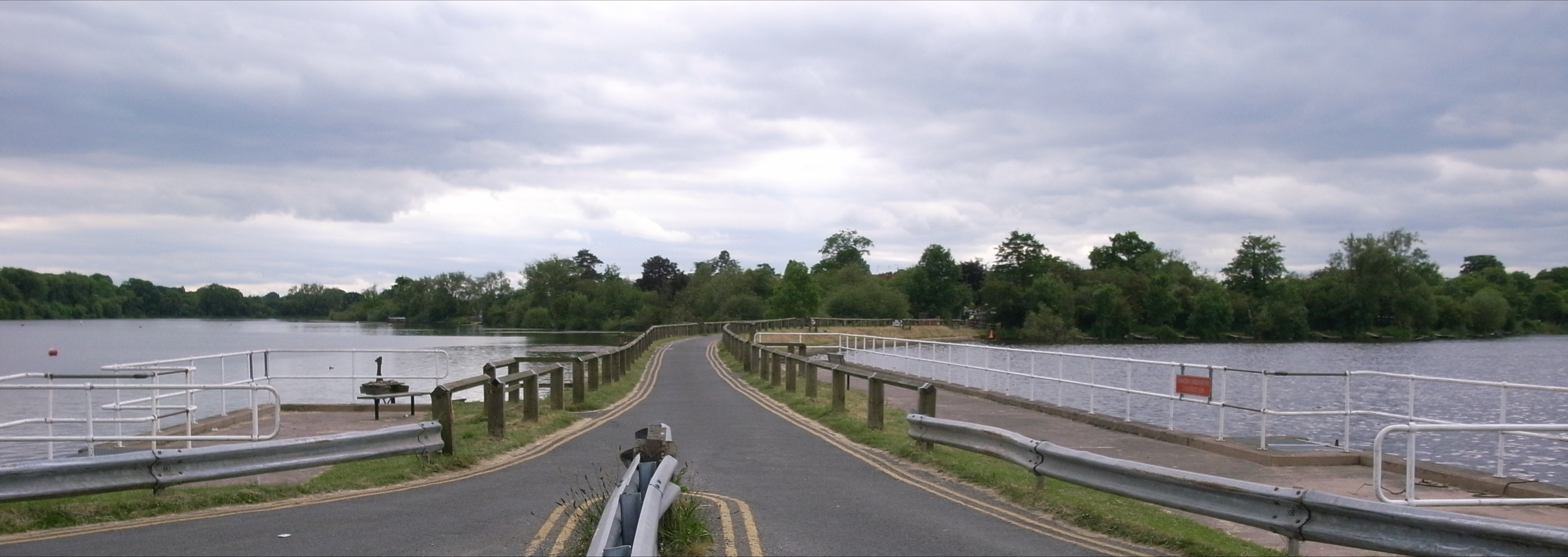
Earlswood Lakes

The Earlswood Lakes are close to the centre of the village. There are numerous footpaths for walking around the lakes and in the adjacent forest. It is possible to fish in some of the lakes and there is a sailing club. The village has a convenience store, village hall (also the home of the village museum), garage and petrol station. Earlswood is in the parish of St Patrick. The village is also home to Earlswood Town F.C.

== Transport ==
Earlswood has a range of transport links. The M42 motorway (Junctions 3 and 4 ) is a few minutes away and The Lakes railway station, in Malthouse Lane, has hourly services to Moor Street and Stratford-on-Avon. There is a limited bus service from the village to Solihull and Redditch, operated by Coventry Minibuses.

== Church ==
A brick church dedicated to St Patrick was built at Salter Street in 1840 and the area formed into a parish in 1843. A tower with five bells was added in 1860 by Thomas Burman in memory of his father; and in 1899 the body of the church was rebuilt. The living, now known as Earlswood, is a vicarage in the gift of the vicar of Tanworth. The church is grade II* listed, and the "reasons for designation" include "The fine High Victorian Gothic tower by G.T. Robinson (1860-1), forms a striking and unexpected accent in a wholly rural landscape". Apart from the tower, it has been described as "one of the finest Arts & Crafts period churches in the Midlands". The church is in the civil parish of Cheswick Green, in Solihull, as Salter Street forms the parish boundary and the church is on its east side, while the ecclesiastical parish of St Patrick covers "Cheswick Green, Dickens Heath, Monkspath, Blythe Valley, Illshaw Heath, and parts of Earlswood".
