= Blythe Valley Park =

District of Solihull, England

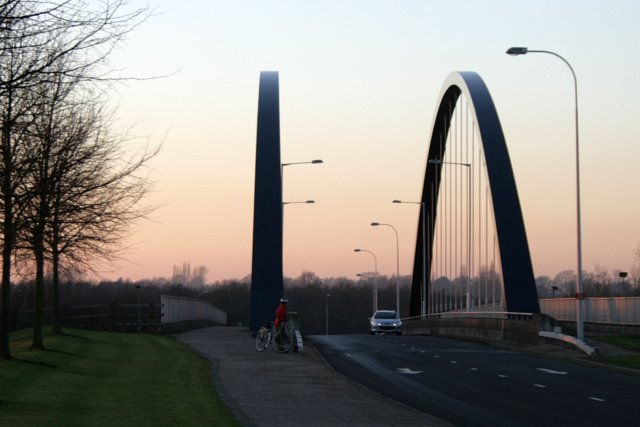
Blythe Valley Park Bridge

Blythe Valley Park is a district of the town of Solihull in the West Midlands conurbation. It is adjacent to Junction 4 of the M42 motorway, on the A34 Stratford Road between the Monkspath district of Solihull, and the villages of Hockley Heath and Illshaw Heath. The district comprises a business park, mini village and nature reserve.

== History ==
The area was agricultural land administered by Sydenhale Farm, (named after the locally prominent Sydenhale family of Tanworth in Arden) until the late 1990s. After the death of the last landowner in 1984, the land was purchased by Solihull Council in preparation for development. Prior to this the land had been part of Hockley Heath parish, itself historically part of the parish of Tanworth-in-Arden.

== Blythe Valley Business Park ==
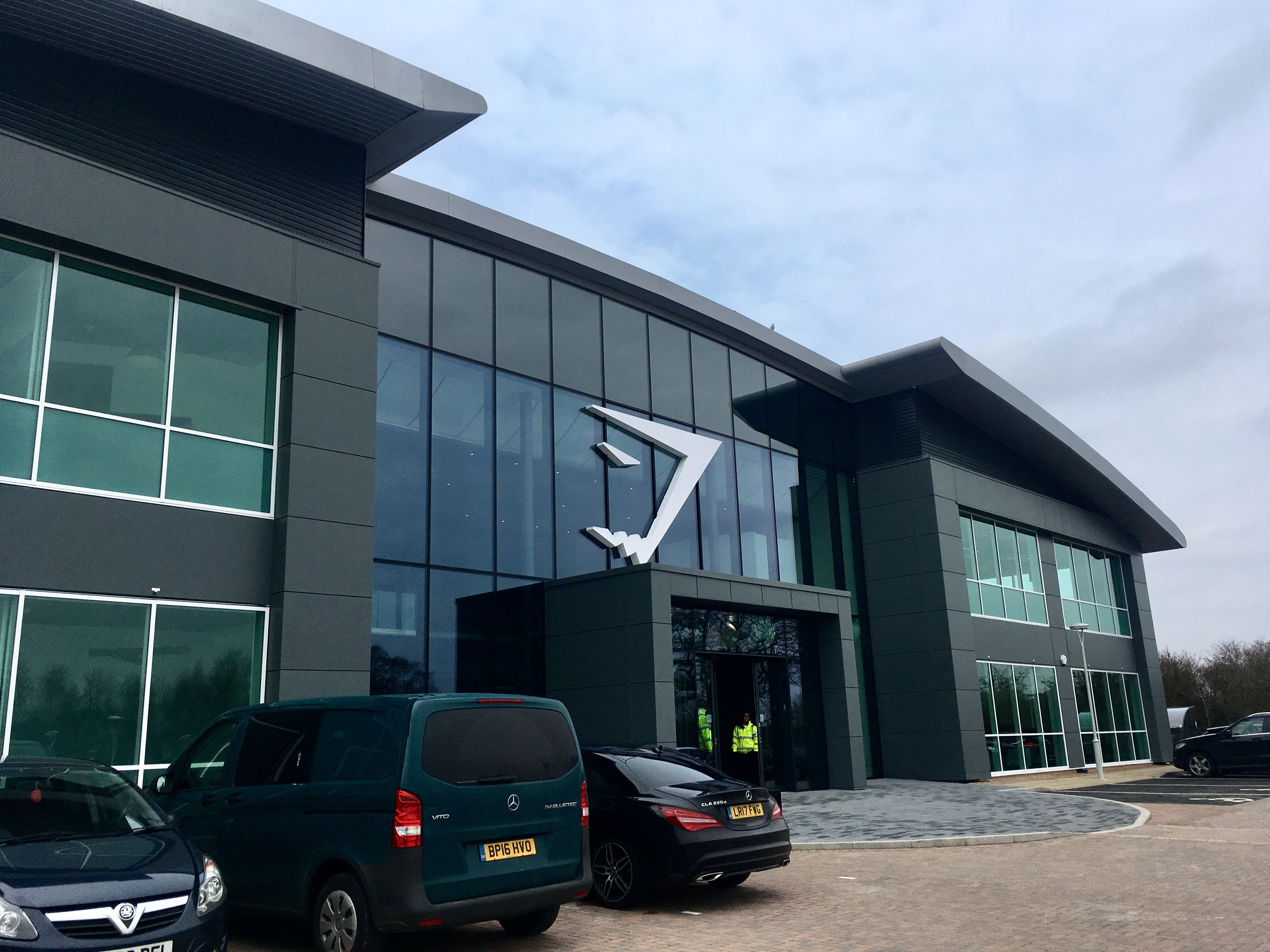
Gymshark's headquarters in Blythe Valley Business Park

The first phase of the project began in 1999 and is now completed. The project is composed of two principal elements; a public park along the valley of the River Blythe and a business park. Because of the location of the site and its proximity to the motorway network and Birmingham Airport it was deemed prime land for office development. The development consists of large office blocks set in parkland, enjoying public footpaths and water fountains. The most apparent element of the development is the Blythe Bridge over the M42, which stands out amongst the functionalist motorway architecture. Junction 4 of the M42 was remodelled and altered to allow for direct access from the motorway.

The land around the business park has also seen further commercial development. On the other side of the A34 road next to the Blythe Valley Business Park is its sister site, the Fore Business Park.

In 2014 proposals were submitted for an eco-friendly service station on land opposite Blythe Valley at junction 4 of the M42. The proposal was ultimately rejected due to concerns of congestion, and the recent approval for construction of around 1000 homes on Blythe Valley Park.

Blythe Valley Business Park has a number of global fashion brands headquartered in the business park, including Gymshark, a multinational athletic apparel retailer and Lounge (company), a multinational women's fashion retailer.

== Blythe Valley Park Village ==
In 2020 construction began on a new 'mini village', including approval for 750 new properties. The first 100 homes were completed in 2021 and benefit from an electric pool car for short journeys, electric car charging points and cycle storage for up to 40 bikes. The new neighborhood also has an independent coffee house and a nursery. The homes are surrounded by 122 acres of parkland, and were built adjacent to a Virgin Active health club and spa. The residents have excellent road connections to the nearby settlements of Illshaw Heath, Hockley Heath and Monkspath.

There are further plans to build a 'community hub', which will have a pre-school, convenience store, shops and an additional 48 apartments. There are also plans for an 80 bed elderly care home facility.

== Blythe Valley Park Nature Reserve ==
The business park lies adjacent to a large protected nature reserve.
