= Wood End, Stratford-on-Avon =

Village in Warwickshire, England

Coordinates: 52.342°N 1.845°W

Wood End
- Location within Warwickshire
- Civil parish: Tanworth-in-Arden
- District: Stratford-on-Avon
- Shire county: Warwickshire
- Region: West Midlands
- Country: England
- Sovereign state: United Kingdom
- Post town: Solihull
- Postcode district: B94
- Police: Warwickshire
- Fire: Warwickshire
- Ambulance: West Midlands
- UK Parliament: Straford-on-Avon

Wood End is a village in Warwickshire, England. It is about 1 mile north of Tanworth-in-Arden (where the population can be found), and has a railway station situated on the Birmingham Snow Hill to Stratford-upon-Avon on the North Warwickshire Line.

== Name ==
The official name of the village is Wood End. To avoid confusion with other Wood Ends' often referred to as "Wood End, Warwickshire", it is commonly referred to as Wood End, Stratford-upon-Avon to distinguish it from Wood End near Tamworth and Wood End near Fillongley.
