= Elmdon Heath =

Place in the Midlands region of England

Coordinates: 52°25′28″N 1°45′54″W

- Location within the West Midlands
- Language: English
- Metropolitan borough: Solihull
- Metropolitan county: West Midlands
- Region: West Midlands
- Country: England
- Sovereign state: United Kingdom
- Police: West Midlands
- Fire: West Midlands
- Ambulance: West Midlands

Elmdon Heath is an area of Solihull, West Midlands, England. It lies within the historic county of Warwickshire. It is located to the north of the town centre, at a distance of approximately one mile. It is primarily residential, though there are a few shops, a garage, a community centre, a secondary school, a primary school and a church centre.

== Geography ==
=== Buildings ===
The area is centred on the Damson Lane thoroughfare and the Greville Arms public house. In addition to this there is a further pub, The Flying Elephant (formerly The Red House), on Hermitage Road. Elmdon Heath is on the edge of the West Midlands conurbation and bordered by the Land Rover factory, Solihull town centre, the residential area of Damsonwood and open countryside. The housing was largely constructed between the 1930s and 1950s, though infill development continues apace. Much of the residential land was previously farmland until it was commandeered during World War Two. The former church of St. Francis of Assisi, which was located on Cornyx Lane, closed when the rector was relocated and no substitute was offered. It was vandalised repeatedly, ending in it burning down and has been demolished, the land under residential development.

=== Canal and former wharf ===
The Grand Union Canal runs through the area, and Elmdon Heath used to be the site of Solihull Wharf, which is now remembered only in the name of Wharf Lane. A large gasworks existed on Wharf Lane. This was demolished by British Gas and replaced with their national offices. When these were moved to nearby Blythe Valley Park the land became available for development; a very large new estate of high-density housing was constructed, which has more than doubled the population of the area. Local residents met this with mixed opinion, some believing it was a good use of the land and others thinking that the estate was an eyesore, the new 'bright orange' buildings standing out against the more traditional housing.

=== Transportation ===
The nearest railway stations are Solihull and Birmingham International at Birmingham Airport, at distances of 1.5 and 3 miles respectively. The area is served by the 966 bus, which connects Solihull to Birmingham Airport, Chelmsley Wood and Erdington, via Elmdon Heath. The S1 bus also connects Elmdon Heath to Damsonwood and Solihull. The M42 motorway is located about 2 miles away. Elmdon Heath is in the parish of Elmdon and the ward of St. Alphege, within the constituency of Solihull.
