= Tanworth-in-Arden =

Village in Warwickshire, England

Coordinates: 52.333°N 1.837°W

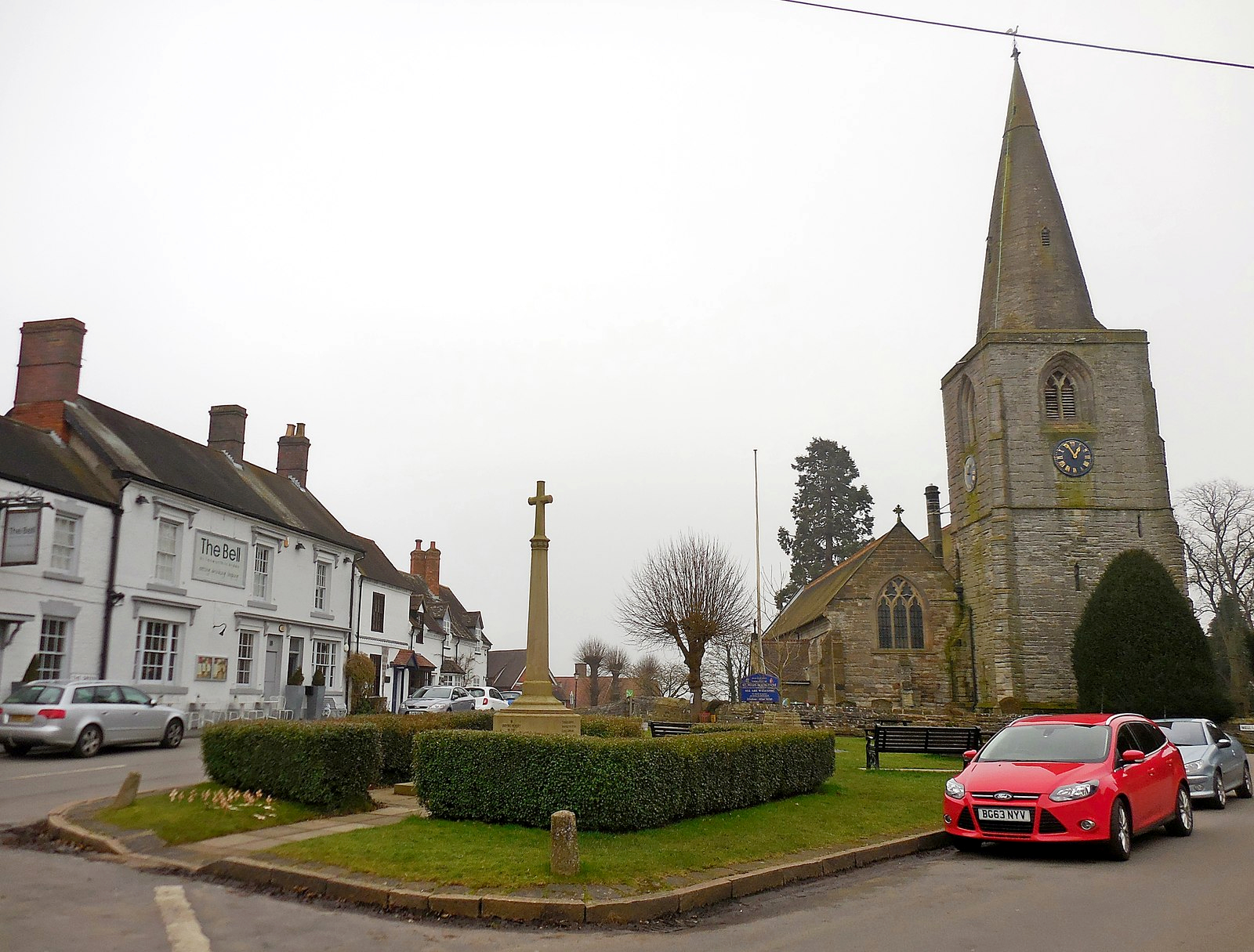
- Village centre

- Location within Warwickshire
- Population: 3,228 (parish 2021)
- Civil parish: Tanworth-in-Arden
- District: Stratford-on-Avon
- Shire county: Warwickshire
- Region: West Midlands
- Country: England
- Sovereign state: United Kingdom
- Post town: SOLIHULL
- Postcode district: B94
- Dialling code: 01789
- Police: Warwickshire
- Fire: Warwickshire
- Ambulance: West Midlands
- UK Parliament: Stratford-on-Avon

Tanworth-in-Arden (/ˈtænwərθ ɪn ˈɑːrdən/; often abbreviated to Tanworth) is a village and civil parish in the county of Warwickshire, England. It is 12.5 miles (20 km) south-southeast of Birmingham, 5.5 miles (9 km) north-east of Redditch and 8 miles (13 km) south-southwest of Solihull and is administered by Stratford-on-Avon District Council. Situated in the far west of the county and close to the Worcestershire border, the civil parish is larger than the village, and includes Tanworth-in-Arden itself plus the nearby settlements of Earlswood, Wood End, Forshaw Heath, Aspley Heath and Danzey Green. The population of the parish was 3,228 at the 2021 UK census.

== History ==
The village is of Anglo-Saxon origin, with the name derived from Tanewotha; meaning the thane's 'worth' or estate. In the 19th century, the suffix 'in-Arden' was added to the name, in order to avoid confusion with the town of Tamworth in Staffordshire, it refers to the Forest of Arden in which the village lay. The parish was at one time very extensive, covering land that now includes Hockley Heath, Earlswood and beyond. In the 14th century, the important families of the area were the Archers of Umberslade Hall, the de Sydenhale family of Ernolds Place and Sydenhall Farm in Illshaw Heath, and the de Fulwoods of Clay Hall.

Throughout most of its modern history Tanworth-in-Arden was part of the "union of Solihull". In 1878 Tanworth-in-Arden lost a sizeable piece of its parish territory when Hockley Heath broke off to form a new parish with the hamlet of Nuthurst (formerly of Hampton-in-Arden parish).

In 1894 Tanworth-in-Arden was included in the Solihull Rural District, before eventually being redesignated under the Stratford-on-Avon District later in the 20th century. Solihull remains the village's post town.

The village was a filming location for the fictional village of Kings Oak from the British television series Crossroads until 1988.

On 29 November 1967 the parish was renamed from "Tanworth" to "Tanworth-in-Arden".

== Notable landmarks ==
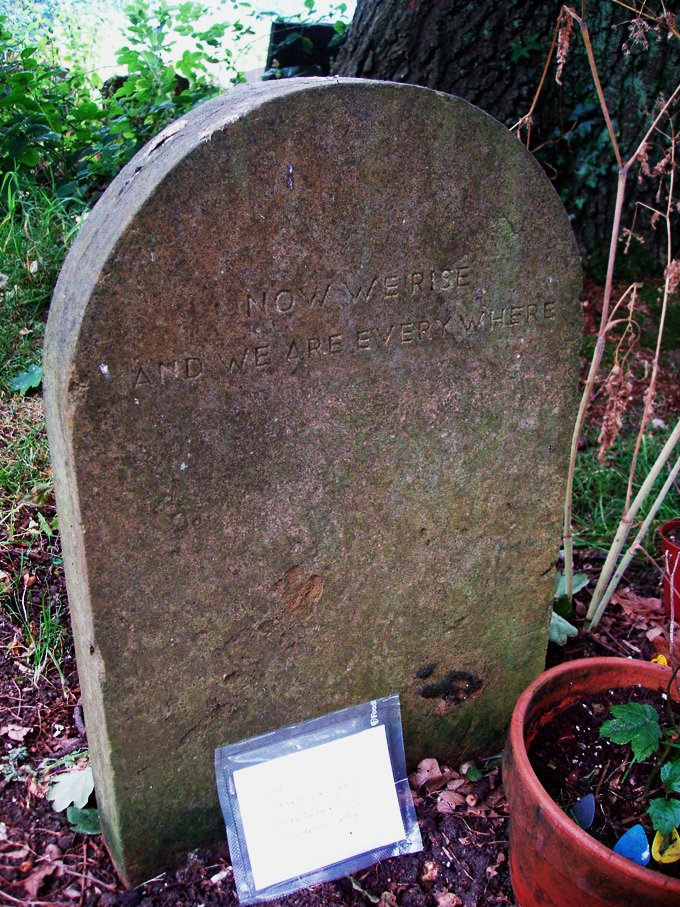
Nick Drake's gravestone. The epitaph reads: 'Now we rise / And we are everywhere', from his song "From the Morning" (on Pink Moon).

Notable historical buildings still standing in the village include The Bell Inn public house and the 14th-century Church of St Mary Magdalene. The boxer "Gentleman" Jack Hood was the licensee of The Bell for 36 years, displaying above the bar the Lonsdale belt that he won on 31 May 1926. (The belt was sold by his daughters in 2011.)

Tanworth was the childhood home of folk musician Nick Drake and his sister, the actress Gabrielle Drake. His grave lies in the parish churchyard. Since his death in 1974, Nick Drake has achieved cult status, and the village churchyard has become a place of pilgrimage for his fans. In recent years, an annual gathering of his fans has been held in the village.

The grave of nine-times world motorcycle champion Mike Hailwood MBE, GM, and his daughter Michelle, who were both killed in a car accident at Portway in 1981, are also to be found here. An annual memorial motorcycle run was held every March from the former Norton motorcycle factory to Tanworth, although this was stopped after the 2011 event.

The parish includes Umberslade Hall, on the border with Nuthurst, which dates from around 1695, and for six hundred years the home of the Archer family and later the industrialist George Frederic Muntz.

== Transport links ==
The village lies close to the ex-Great Western Railway line from Birmingham Moor Street to Stratford-upon-Avon but has never had a station of its own: rather it lies midway between two others - Wood End to the north and Danzey to the south, both about one mile (1.6 km) distant, though the latter was once known as Danzey for Tanworth.

== Historic estates ==
Historic estates within the parish of Tanworth include:

- Ladbrooke
