= Cheswick Green =

Village and civil parish in England

Coordinates: 52.3775°N 1.8139°W

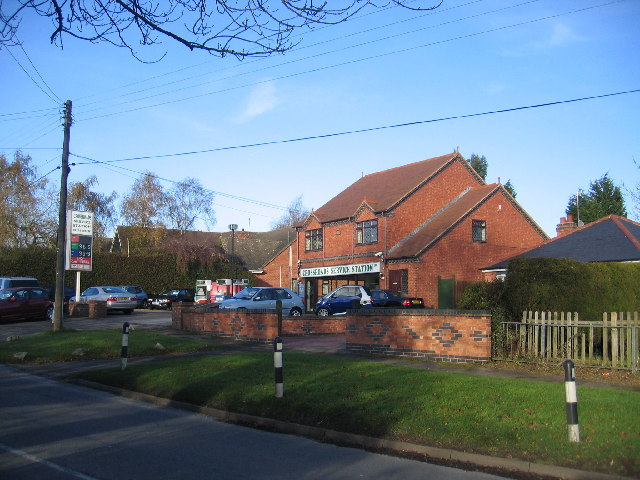
Crossroads Service Station, Cheswick Green

Cheswick Green is a village and civil parish within the Metropolitan Borough of Solihull in the English county of West Midlands, incorporating the nearby hamlet of Illshaw Heath. The settlement lies approximately 3 miles (4.8 km) south west of Solihull town centre. The civil parish population as taken at the 2021 census was 2741. It borders Dickens Heath and Monkspath to the north, and Earlswood and Warings Green to the south. The northernmost part of Warings Green lies in the parish of Cheswick Green.

== Illshaw Heath ==
The hamlet of Illshaw heath, which predates Cheswick Green, was home of the de Yelschawe family from which it takes its name. There is an earthwork indicative of where Sidenhall Manor, home to the de Sidenhall (or Sydenhale) family, once stood.

== Cheswick Green ==
The village of Cheswick Green was a planned settlement from the late-1960s and is large enough to sustain two shops, a café, The Saxon pub in the Craft Union chain, a pharmacy and a doctors surgery.

The village is served by Landflight Bus Service which runs hourly to Shirley and Solihull usually.

== Governance ==
It was previously part of the civil parish of Hockley Heath, but was broken off in 2009 to become its own civil parish. The civil parish of Cheswick Green includes the village of Cheswick Green, the hamlet of Illshaw Heath, a small part of Warings Green, and the new Blythe Valley Park Village.
