= Earlswood Lakes =

Man-made reservoirs in Earlswood, England

Coordinates: 52.363°N 1.840°W

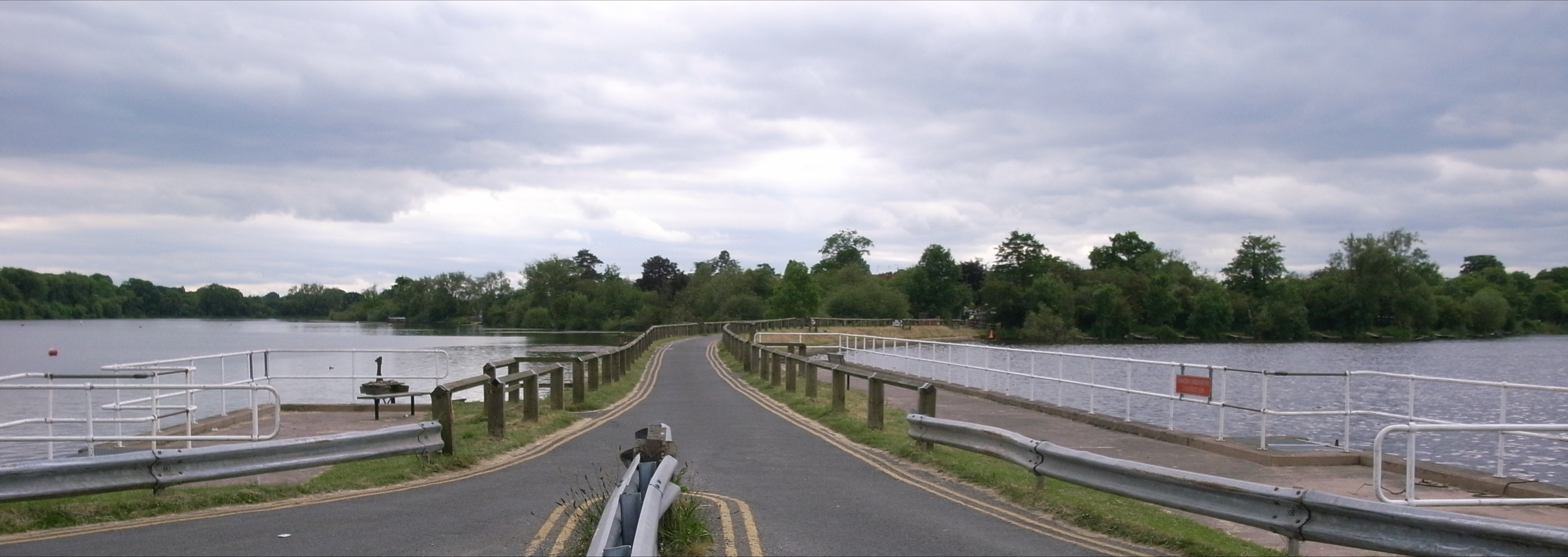
Windmill and Engine Lakes, Earlswood

Earlswood Lakes is the modern name for three man-made reservoirs which were built in the 1820s at Earlswood in Warwickshire, England, to supply water to the Stratford-upon-Avon Canal. They still supply the canal, and also provide leisure facilities, including sailing, fishing, and walking. The northern banks of the lakes form the borough and county boundary with the Metropolitan Borough of Solihull and the West Midlands.

== History ==
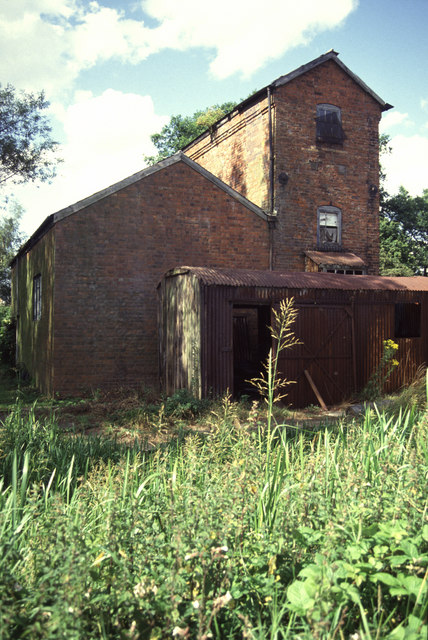
Earlswood Engine House

The Stratford-upon-Avon Canal runs from Kings Norton Junction on the Worcester and Birmingham Canal to the River Avon at Stratford-upon-Avon. About halfway along at Kingswood is a junction with the Grand Union Canal. The initial 9.75 miles (15.6 km) to Hockley Heath is level, but after that, the canal drops through 55 locks on its way to Stratford-upon-Avon. In order to supply water to the system, the Earlswood Lakes were constructed in the 1820s. Construction took nearly 5 years to complete, and the labour force included prisoners of war from the Napoleonic Wars. The cost of construction was £297,000.

Being so near to Birmingham, the lakes proved attractive to visitors from the city from the early 1900s, and their popularity has been maintained, with recent improvements to the facilities which they provide. The Lakes railway station was built to bring tourists to the area and is on the Birmingham to Stratford line.

The three reservoirs are called Engine Pool, Windmill Pool and Terry's Pool, and a Grade II listed engine house is located beside the Engine Pool. The lakes cover 25 acres (10 ha), 25 acres (10 ha) and 20 acres (8.1 ha) respectively. The lakes are fed by tributaries of the River Blythe, and in turn outfall into that river also.

== Earlswood Lake "Monster" ==
Fishermen at the lake had reported having their lines cut and had witnessed attacks on ducks by a creature branded in the press as the Earlswood Lake Monster. Previously believed to be a cryptid the creature was in fact an Alligator snapping turtle, proved when a carp fisherman caught a 33 pound (16 kilo) specimen on 2 September 2008. The turtle is not native to the UK and it is believed it was previously a pet, released into the lake when it became too big for its owner. The fisherman released the turtle back into the lake, however it was caught again two years later by a different fisherman, and sent to West Midland Safari Park in Worcestershire, where it is now on display and part of a captive breeding programme.

== Facilities ==
The lakes were managed by British Waterways, but in 1997, the Earlswood Lakes Partnership was formed, with additional representation from the Waterways Trust and the Warwickshire Wildlife Trust. This body has responsibility for the management of the lakes, which now provide a variety of recreational activities.

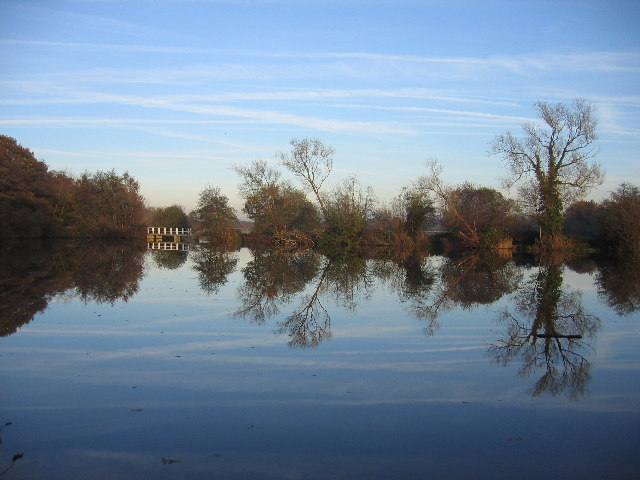
Terry's Pool

=== Fishing ===
All three lakes are stocked with fish and are popular both locally, and as a venue for fishing matches. Prior to 1999, the fish stocks were mainly Bream and Roach and were unmanaged, but with a decline in the call for fishing of this type, major changes were made. The Engine Pool was drained to a very low level, and all of the large bream were moved to the Windmill pool, while the rest of the fish were moved to local canals. The pool was then refilled and stocked with five tons of Carp in 2000. New car parks, walkways and fishing platforms were constructed, to improve the facilities, and these are well-used, although the platforms are less useful during the summer months when the water levels drop, as water is used to feed the canal. Engine pool was drained in late 2017 after the Canal and River Trust became aware that it contained a population of invasive catfish. All the fish were removed, and the reservoir was then refilled and restocked. It re-opened for fishing in early 2020, and the restocking programme was expected to have released 40,000 carp weighing an average of 8 ounces (230 g) by 2021.

The Engine Pool contains mainly carp, and has flourished, to the extent that it held the UK five-hour match record in 2000, when 414 lb (188 kg) of fish were caught in a five-hour period. Bream, together with roach and perch can be caught in the Windmill Pool, although care is needed as the pool is also home to a sailing club. Terry's Pool is still an unmanaged fishery, containing bream, roach and perch, together with pike and some carp.

=== Sailing ===
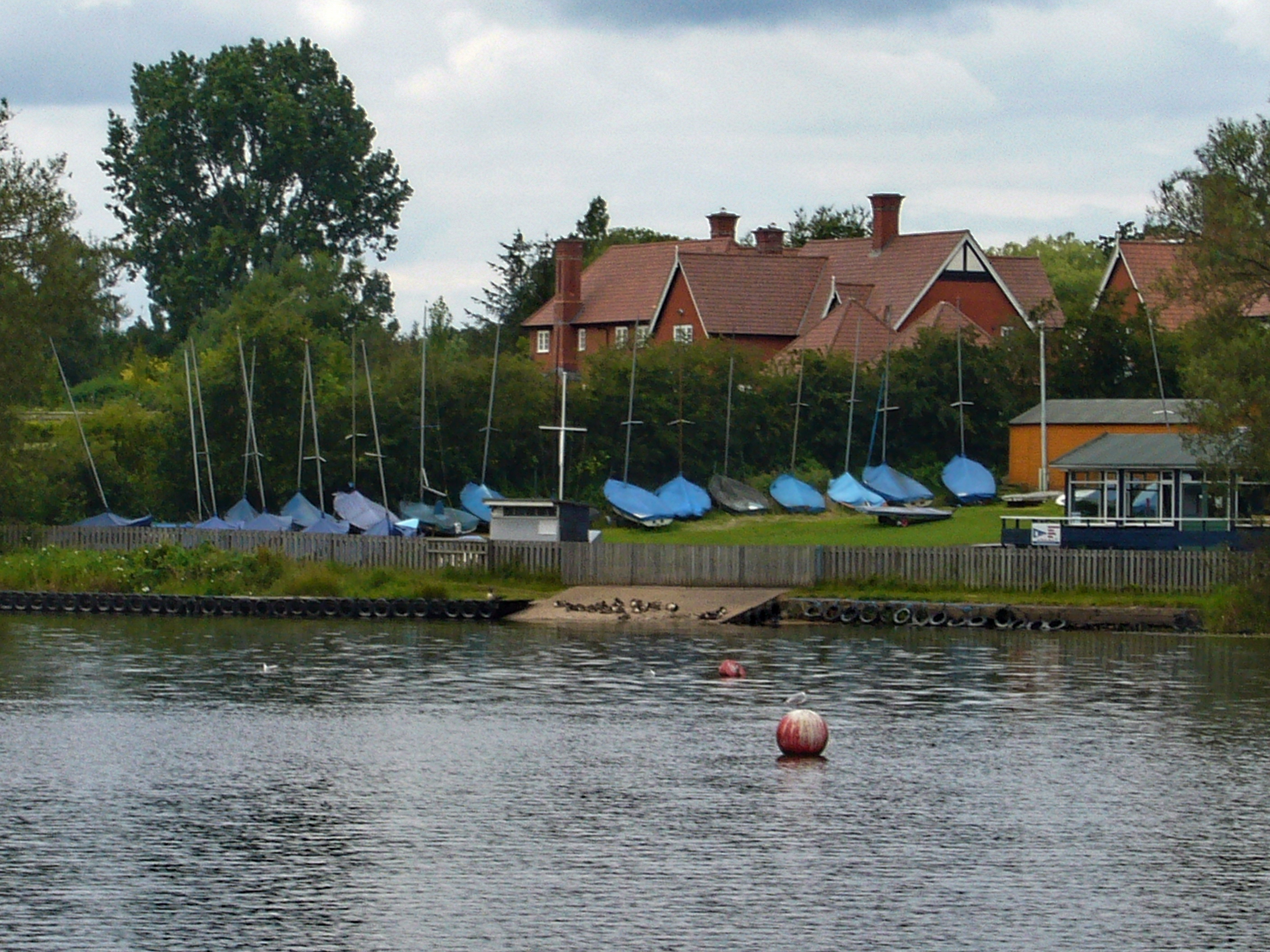
Earlswood Lake Sailing Club

Windmill Pool is the home to the Earlswood Lakes Sailing Club, which was formed in 1963, by R Lewis, and as of 2020, has around 120 members. Most modern classes of boat can be sailed, including Merlin-Rocket, Enterprise, National 12, Laser, Toppers, Mirrors and Solos. Sailing by young people from 8 to 15 years of age is encouraged, using boats in the Optimist or Topper class. The sailing club have a clubhouse which overlooks the pool.

=== Walking ===
The managing Partnership was awarded a grant from the Local Heritage Initiative in 2002, which resulted in the upgrading of pathways around the site, to create a trail around the lakes, much of which is accessible to mobility-impaired users. Leaflets and children's activity sheets have been produced, together with marker posts to aid the interpretation of the site.

=== Craft Centre ===
The Earlswood Lakes Craft Centre was established in 1981, when it was part of Manor Farm. Mr Terry Osborne sold it to a major company from Stratford. It has since become autonomous, changing its name and ownership in 2001, and currently contains 23 units providing a wide range of craft products.

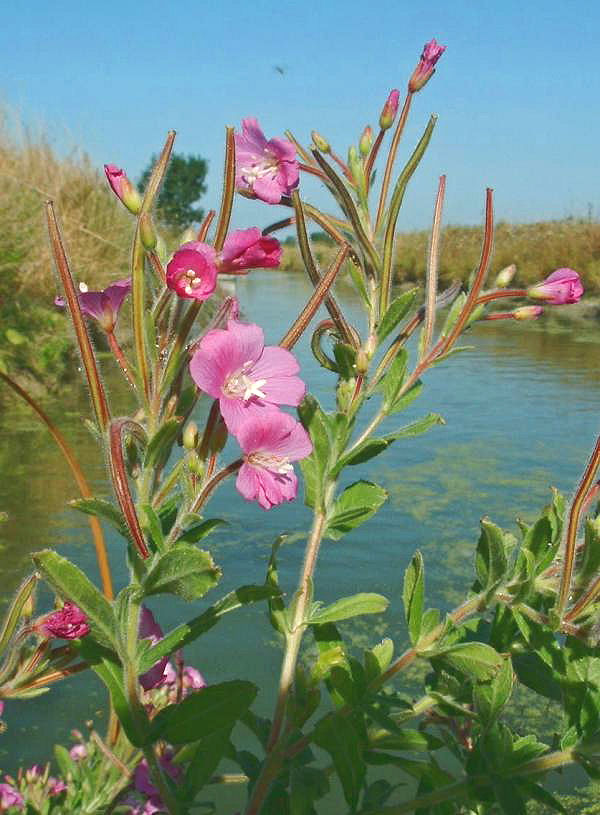
Great willowherb Epilobium hirsutum can be found around the lakes

=== Wildlife ===
Terry's Pool is a wildlife reserve, and the whole area has a rich variety of plant and animal life. This includes Pipistrellus and Daubenton's bats, muntjac deer, and more recently, otters.

Many varieties of plant and tree life can be found in and around the shores of the lakes and the water channels. Plants such as Angelica, great willowherb, amphibious bistort, betony, gipsywort and yellow flag iris are all common to the area. Many water loving willow trees can be seen around the lakes, these are managed to promote new growth and more willow trees.

As of 2010, there are signs that otters frequent the Engine Pool, and there are hopes that breeding pairs will make it their permanent home. An unwanted pest however is the mink that have escaped or been released from fur farms and have found their way onto the lakes via the network of rivers and canals in the area.

Terry's Pool is bounded at its western edge by the Clowes Wood and New Fallings Coppice site of special scientific interest (notified in 1973). The Birmingham to Stratford-upon-Avon railway line runs through the middle of the 45.3 hectares (111.9 acres) site. The ancient woodlands are excellent examples of lowland mixed oakwoods, and support a large and important breeding bird population. Forty-nine species of woodland bird breed in Clowes Wood, including all three species of woodpecker and six species of tits, including willow tit. Also the wood warbler, lesser whitethroat and grasshopper warbler breed regularly along with five other species of warbler. Predators include Eurasian sparrowhawks, common kestrels and the tawny owl.

== See also ==
- Canals of Great Britain
- History of the British canal system
