= Earlswood railway station (West Midlands) =

Railway station in the West Midlands, England

Earlswood
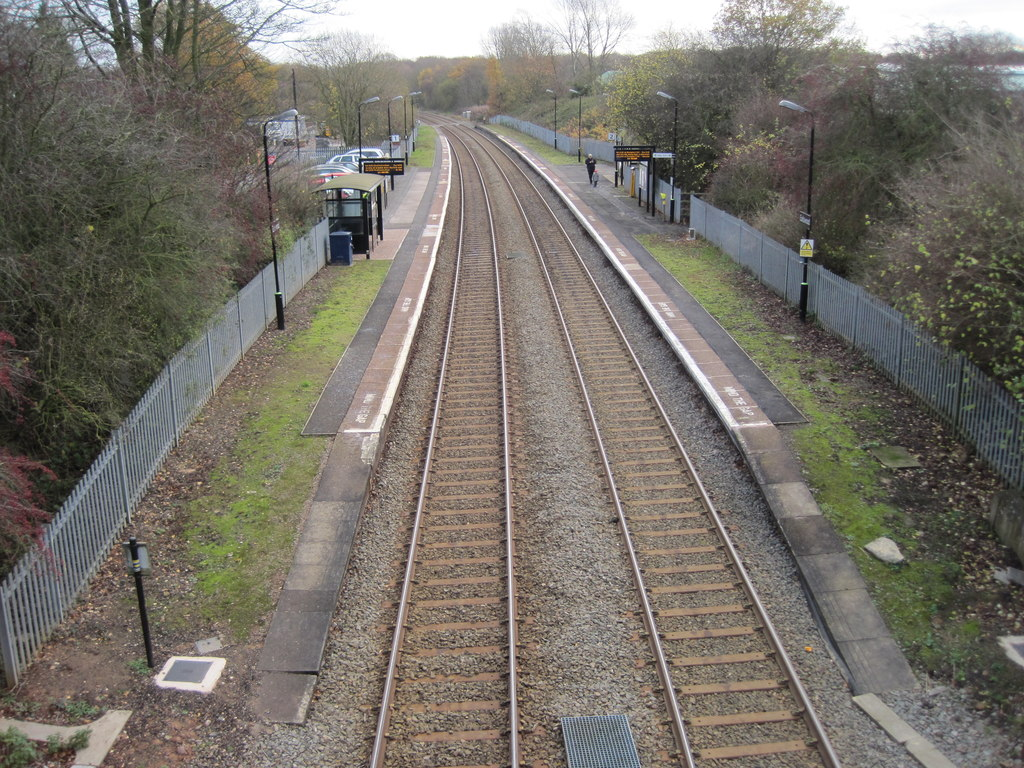

General information
- Location: Earlswood, Solihull; England
- Coordinates: 52.3667°N 1.8614°W
- Grid reference: SP095742
- Manager: West Midlands Trains
- Transit authority: Transport for West Midlands
- Platforms: 2

Other information
- Station code: EWD
- Fare zone: 5
- Classification: DfT category F2

History
- Opened: 1908

Passengers
- 2021/22: ▲22,246
- 2022/23: ▲24,804
- 2023/24: ▲27,844
- 2024/25: ▲33,834
- 2025/26: ▲36,970
Location
Notes
- Passenger statistics from the Office of Rail and Road

Earlswood railway station is located on the western fringe of the village of Earlswood on the West Midlands/Warwickshire border in England. The platforms straddle the county border, with the approach road on the West Midlands side. The station, and all trains serving it, are operated by West Midlands Trains.

Originally opened as Earlswood Lakes in mid-1908, the station was renamed Earlswood on 6 May 1974 despite being located next to the settlement of Foreshaw Heath and The Lakes railway station being located closer to Earlswood village.

== Services ==
The station is served by hourly trains in each direction, westbound to Kidderminster via Birmingham Snow Hill and southbound to Stratford-upon-Avon. Evening services continue to Worcester Shrub Hill or terminate at Snow Hill or Birmingham Moor Street. On Sundays, services towards Kidderminster continue to Worcester Foregate Street.

== See also ==
- The Lakes railway station

Preceding station	National Rail	Following station
Wythall	West Midlands Railway; Birmingham to Worcester via Kidderminster line-Stratford; North Warwickshire Line	The Lakes
