= The Lakes railway station =

Railway station in Warwickshire, England

The Lakes
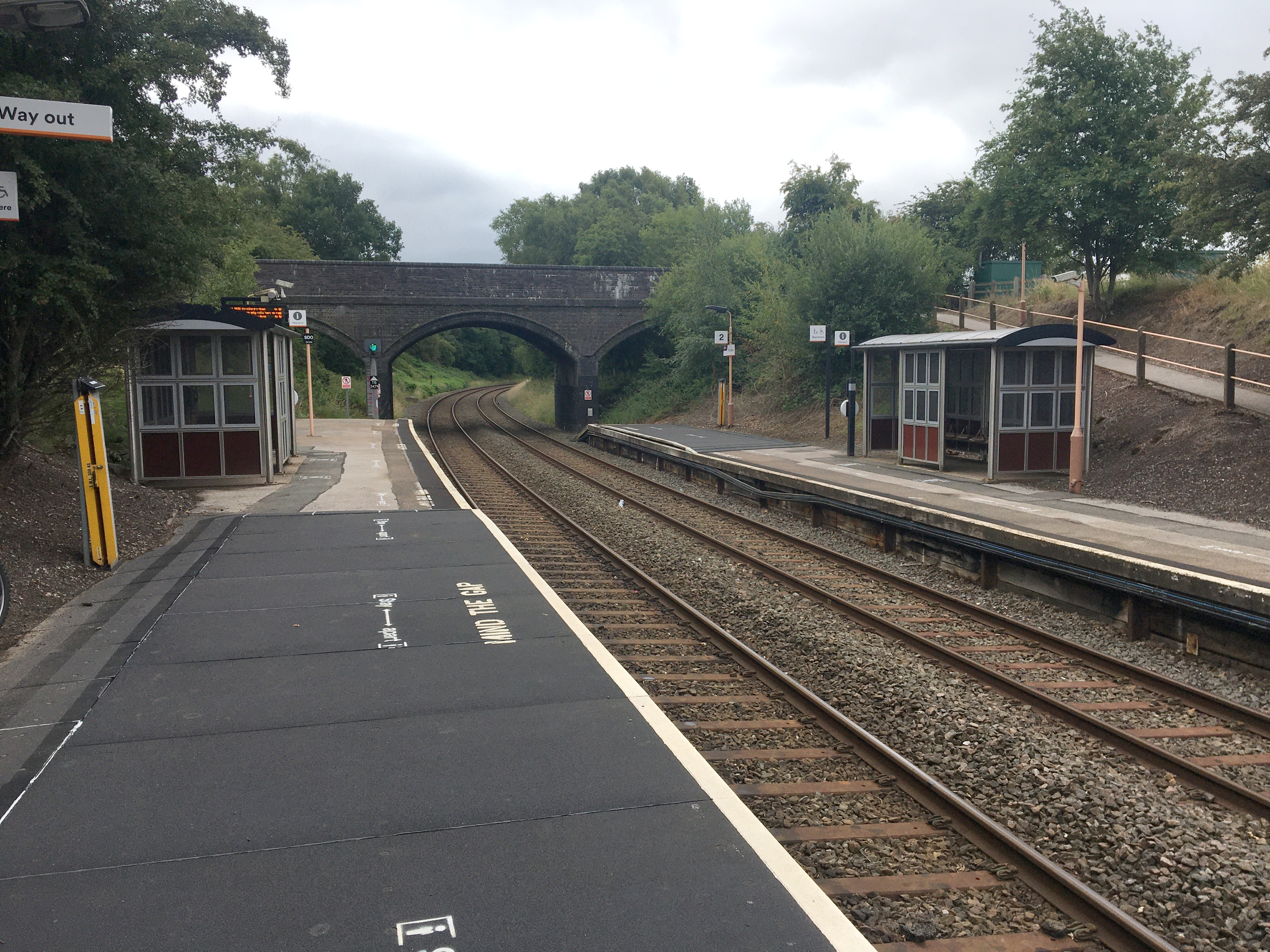
- The station in 2020

General information
- Location: Earlswood Lakes, Stratford-on-Avon; England
- Coordinates: 52.3591°N 1.8448°W
- Grid reference: SP106734
- Manager: West Midlands Railway
- Platforms: 2

Other information
- Station code: TLK
- Classification: DfT category F2

History
- Opened: 3 June 1935

Passengers
- 2021/22: ▲9,298
- 2022/23: ▲10,532
- 2023/24: ▲14,476
- 2024/25: ▲17,778
- 2025/26: ▲19,888
Location
Notes
- Passenger statistics from the Office of Rail and Road

The Lakes is a railway station located on the North Warwickshire Line in the north of Stratford-on-Avon District in Warwickshire, England. It is sited between Earlswood and Wood End, 7 miles 50 chains (12.3 km) from Tyseley South Junction. The nearest settlement is the village of Earlswood. The station was built to serve the nearby Earlswood Lakes, which were a popular destination for daytrippers at the time.

== History ==
The station opened by the Great Western Railway as The Lakes Halt on 3 June 1935, originally built as a halt for fishermen, but reverted to its current name from 6 May 1968. As it was only designed to cater for local traffic, it was built with relatively short platforms, being only 130 feet (40 m) long, a third of the length of the platforms at neighbouring Earlswood.

== Facilities ==
The station only has basic facilities, including shelters on both platforms. As there are no facilities to purchase tickets, passengers must buy one in advance, or from the guard on the train.

== Passenger volume ==
Passenger volume at The Lakes
	2004–05	2005–06	2006–07	2007–08	2008–09	2009–10	2010–11	2011–12	2012–13	2013–14	2014–15	2015–16	2016–17	2017–18	2018–19	2019–20	2020–21	2021–22	2022–23	2023–24	2024–25
Entries and exits	10,210	9,792	8,957	6,851	10,884	11,850	11,832	12,392	11,564	13,124	12,116	12,812	13,888	13,010	12,666	13,058	3,138	9,298	10,532	14,476	17,778

The statistics cover twelve month periods that start in April.

== Services ==
The service in each direction between Birmingham and Stratford runs hourly (including Sundays) with most northbound services running through to Kidderminster. Until the May 2023 timetable change it was a request stop, meaning passengers wishing to board a train here needed to signal their intent to board to the driver; those wishing to alight needing to inform the train conductor. In addition, due to the short length of the platforms, passengers boarding or alighting here must only do so through the front carriage. All services are operated by West Midlands Railway.

Preceding station	National Rail	Following station
Earlswood	West Midlands Railway; North Warwickshire Line	Wood End

== Bibliography ==
- Quick, Michael (2023). Railway Passenger Stations in Great Britain: A Chronology (PDF) (5th ed.). London: Railway and Canal Historical Society.
- Wills, Dixe (2014). Tiny Stations (Paperback, 1st reprint ed.). Basingstoke: AA Publishing. ISBN 978-0-7495-7732-2.
