= Dickens Heath =

Village in the West Midlands, England

Coordinates: 52.3856°N 1.8374°W

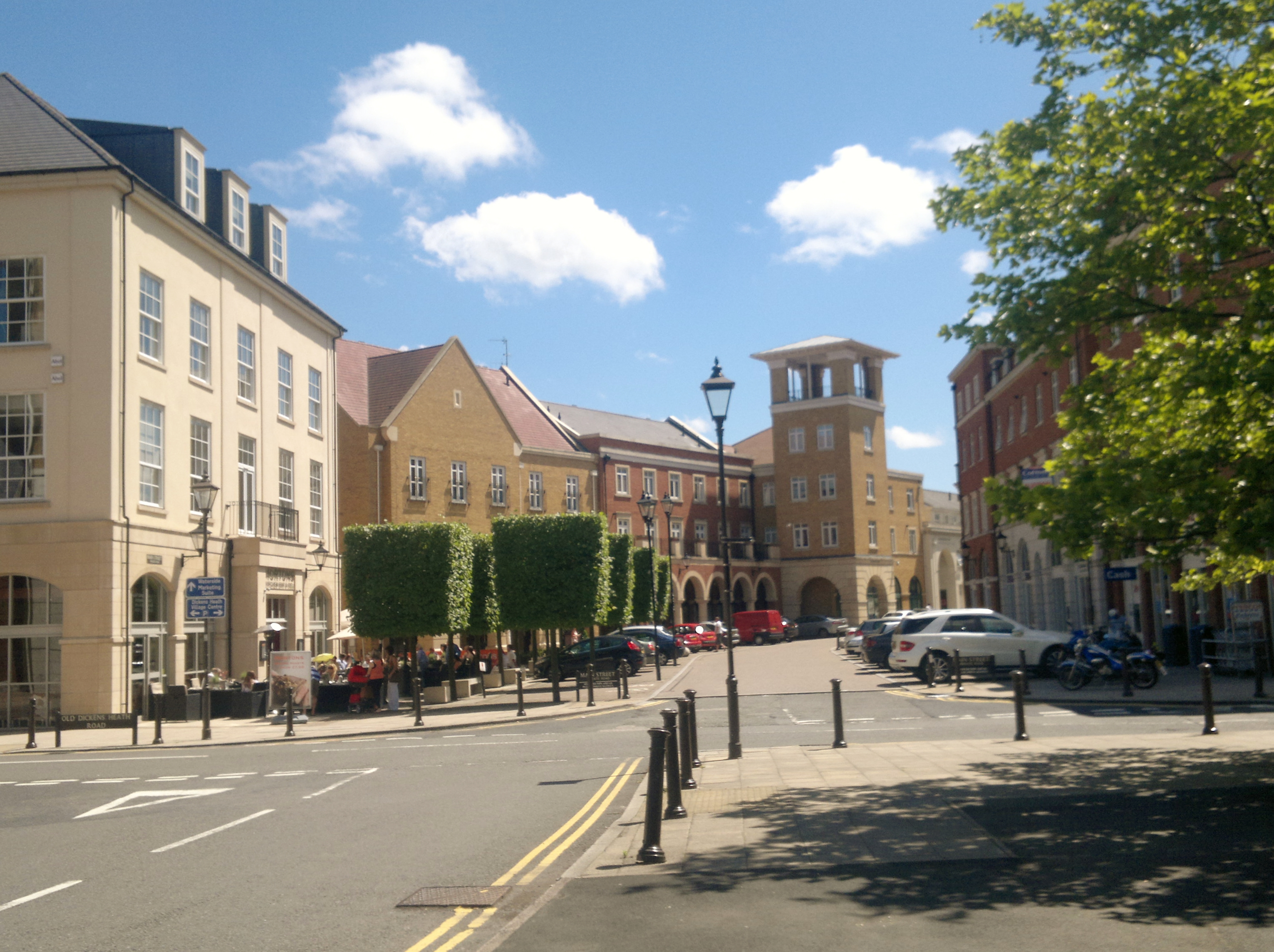
Main Street, Dickens Heath, Solihull, West Midlands

Dickens Heath is a large modern village and civil parish in the borough of Solihull in the West Midlands and historic Warwickshire, incorporating the much older hamlet of Whitlocks End. It was previously part of the civil parish of Hockley Heath, and borders Cheswick Green and Tidbury Green in Solihull, as well as Major's Green in Worcestershire.

Situated 3.5 miles (5.6 km) southwest of Solihull town centre, Dickens Heath new village had a population of 4,793 people as taken at the 2021 census.

== History ==
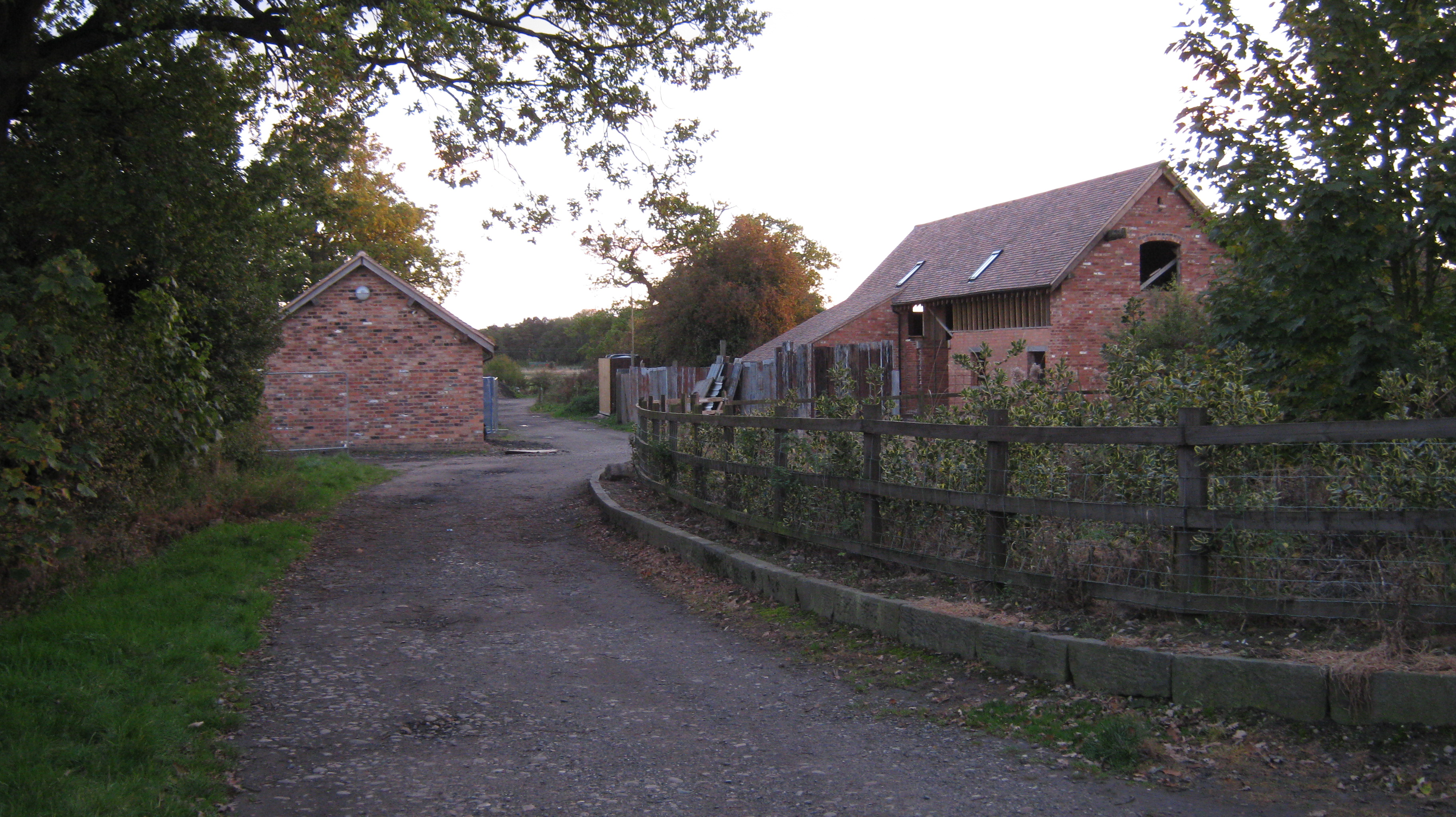
Whitlock's End Farm

The hamlet of Whitlocks End pre-dates the village of Dickens Heath, with its name believed to date back to at least the 13th century. The origins of the name are believed to be from "Wihtlac's open land". The hamlet would originally have been part of the Forest of Arden, and this name would likely refer to a clearing, or 'open land' in the forest owned by a 'Wihtlac' (pronounced Whitelock).

The name Dickens Heath is believed to be associated with Thomas Dykens, who lived in the district in 1524. Dickens Heath was one of the several areas of open common land in Solihull parish. It was described as being of 10 acres (4.0 ha) in the 1632 Manorial Survey of Solihull. At the time of the 1841 census, Dickens Heath was a hamlet and most of the people who lived there were agricultural labourers. Maps show that little changed over the next 150 years, until the new village began taking shape in 1997.

The farm at Whitlocks End is grade II listed. Whitlocks End Farm is itself of modern red brickwork, but south of it is a 17th-century barn. In the field to the south are the remains of a moat.

The engineer and aluminium pioneer James Fern Webster, lived in Whitlocks End in the 1870s.

In 1936, Whitlocks End railway station opened.

Whereas Whitlocks End at one time referred to a reasonably large area, in modern times the definition has tended to be limited to the area directly between the villages of Major's Green and Tidbury Green.

== Origins of the new village ==
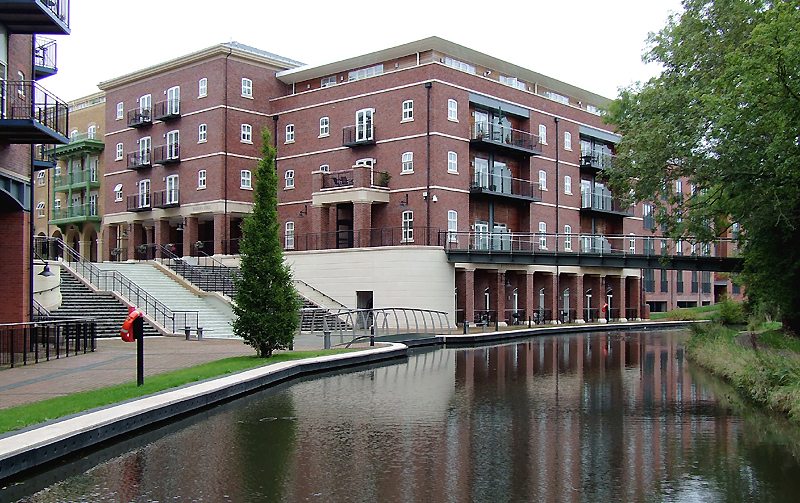
Dickens Heath waterfront

The origins of the new village date back to November 1989 and Solihull Council's need to accommodate 8,100 new homes between 1988 and 2001. The Solihull unitary development plan proposed a settlement of 850 new houses adjacent to the existing hamlets of Dickens Heath Road and Tythebarn Lane.

In May 1991, there was a public enquiry into objections and, following a favourable response by the government inspector, Solihull Council approved the principle of the Dickens Heath project in December 1992.

From the outset, the council decided that Dickens Heath would be special and would not be just a large housing estate in the country. The Council decided that the new development would be based on the model of a traditional village, made up of shops, offices, restaurants, and homes as well as a school, library, village hall, doctors' surgery, pub, village green and country park. London architects John Simpson and Partners devised a concept plan, which was developed and refined to become the approved masterplan in 1995. The four key elements of the masterplan were that the new settlement should:

1. have a clear identity which gives residents a sense of place and belonging
2. echo the traditional features of village development including homes, employment, recreation, social and welfare facilities intermixed to create a cohesive whole
3. provide a range of housing, from first-time buyer housing through to family housing and smaller units suitable for the elderly, thereby creating a mixed community of all ages and incomes
4. create a safe and pleasing environment for pedestrians while still accommodating the motor car, but without allowing it to dominate the environment

In March 1995, there was a second public enquiry into Solihull's unitary development plan. Outline planning permission was approved by the council in December 1996.

Construction began in August 1997 with the first show home opening in December 1997. The first house was occupied in May 1998. The school opened in September 2002 and the library opened in October 2004.

== Constructing the new village ==
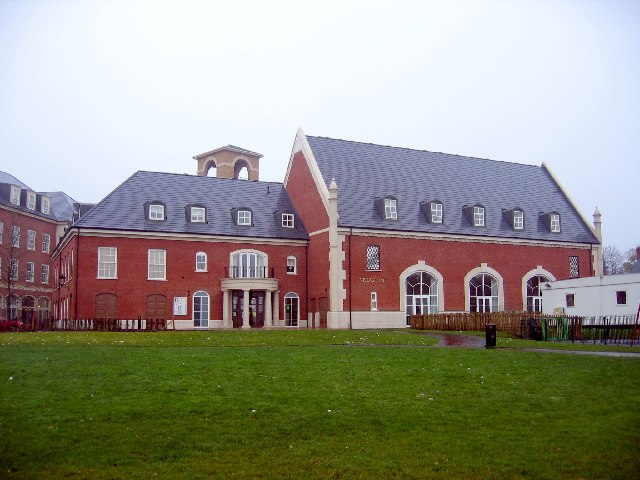
Dicken's Heath Village Hall

The consortium of developers was legally obliged to provide the village infrastructure at a total cost of around £10 million.

The agreement required a financial contribution and/or provision of land for:

- the village school
- the community hall and library
- the village green
- the parkland
- the nature reserve
- the walkways
- the wharf
- the highways
- the medical centre
- a church

Although building on the final stage of Dickens Heath is still yet to happen with the current housing slump and slow sales of current stock being blamed, the village has become a vibrant centre with a high population of youngsters making the village a fun place to live.

Dickens Heath has attracted both criticism and praise in equal measure. With some traditional borough residents not liking the density of building in some elements of the development. In other areas, there has been a very positive response to aspects of the development, such as the broad range of housing styles and accommodation, as well as the new local primary school that is one of the only schools in the entire Solihull borough to be rated as 'outstanding' by the recent OFSTED inspection. The school's latest rating from 2017 is 'good'.

== Canalside ==
The Stratford-upon-Avon Canal, which links Solihull with Warwickshire, flows around the edge of the village and is popular with canal boaters. Herons, kingfishers and ducks can be seen here, as well as bats, foxes and badgers.

Nearby woodlands, which are remnants of the ancient Forest of Arden provide a home for bluebells, wood anemones and wood sorrel.

== Timeline ==
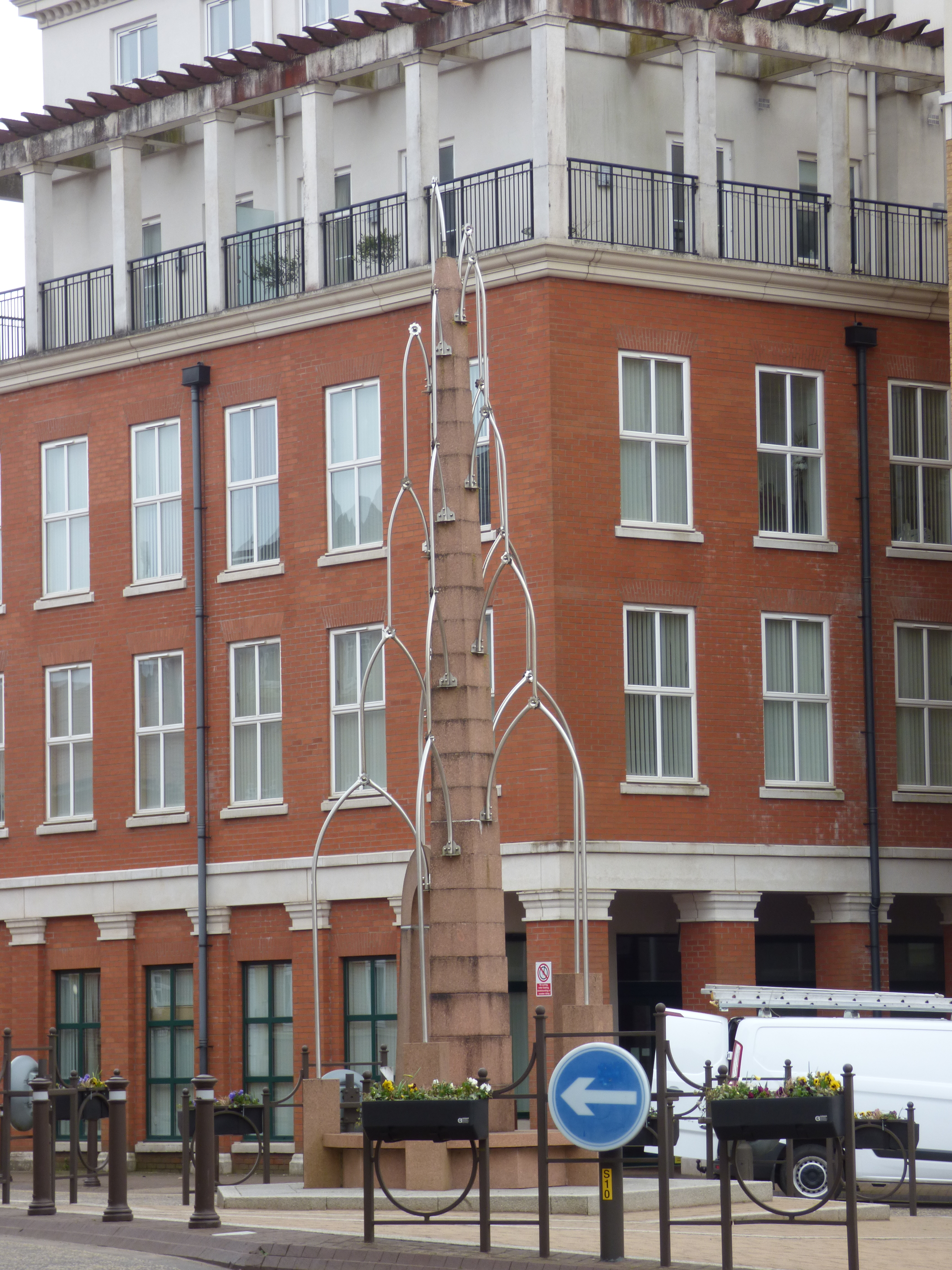
Rumbush Lane, Dickens Heath - sculpture near The Customs House

Key milestones in the development of Dickens Heath new village are:

- 1989: The original concept for a new village was created in response to the search for housing land to accommodate 8,100 new homes in the borough between 1988 and 2001.
- 1991: The principle of a new village at Dickens Heath was examined at the public local inquiry into the council's development plan (the Solihull Unitary Development Plan)
- 1992: The Government Inspector who conducted the Inquiry endorsed the principle of the new village and the site was subsequently released for housing by the Council with an estimated capacity of at least 850 dwellings
- 1994: The council approved a detailed masterplan. The masterplan was to be implemented by the consortium of developers which included Berkeley Homes, Bryant Homes, Redrow Homes, Trencherwood Homes and David Wilson Homes.
- 1996: The original outline planning application for the new village was approved following the completion of a legal agreement to secure the provision of roads, footpaths, community facilities and open space, including the parkland, the village green, canal walkways and the nature reserve.
- 1997: Building of the new village began towards the end of the year
- 1998: The first house was completed and occupied in May
- 2002: Dickens Heath Primary School opened in September
- 2003: Detailed consent for village centre approved
- 2004: Library opened
- 2005: Market Square phase completed
- 2006: Waterside phase completed
- 2009: Garden Squares first phase completed
- 2009: Dickens Heath Parish Council created out of the former Hockley Heath Parish
- 2010: Dickens Heath Country Park designated a Local Nature Reserve
- 2010: Dickens Heath coat of arms commissioned from College of Arms
- 2012: Dickens Heath Development Company Limited in liquidation
- 2012/2013: Residents and businesses complain of poor road standards on Rumbush Lane, unfinished developments and unadopted roads.
