= Monkspath =

Area of Solihull, West Midlands, England

Coordinates: 52.390°N 1.792°W

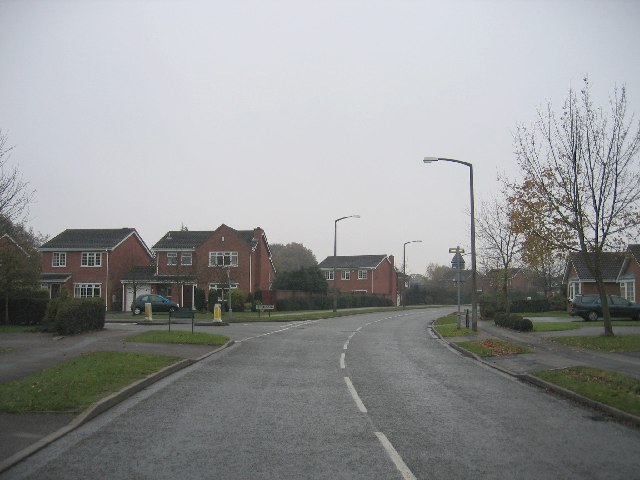
- Frankholmes Drive, Monkspath photographed in November 2005

- Location within the West Midlands
- Metropolitan borough: Solihull
- Metropolitan county: West Midlands
- Region: West Midlands
- Country: England
- Sovereign state: United Kingdom
- Police: West Midlands
- Fire: West Midlands
- Ambulance: West Midlands

Monkspath is a large residential community and light-industrial area of Solihull, West Midlands, England, southeast of the town's Shirley district (and served by Junction 4 of the M42 motorway). Monkspath is in the Blythe ward of the Metropolitan Borough of Solihull.

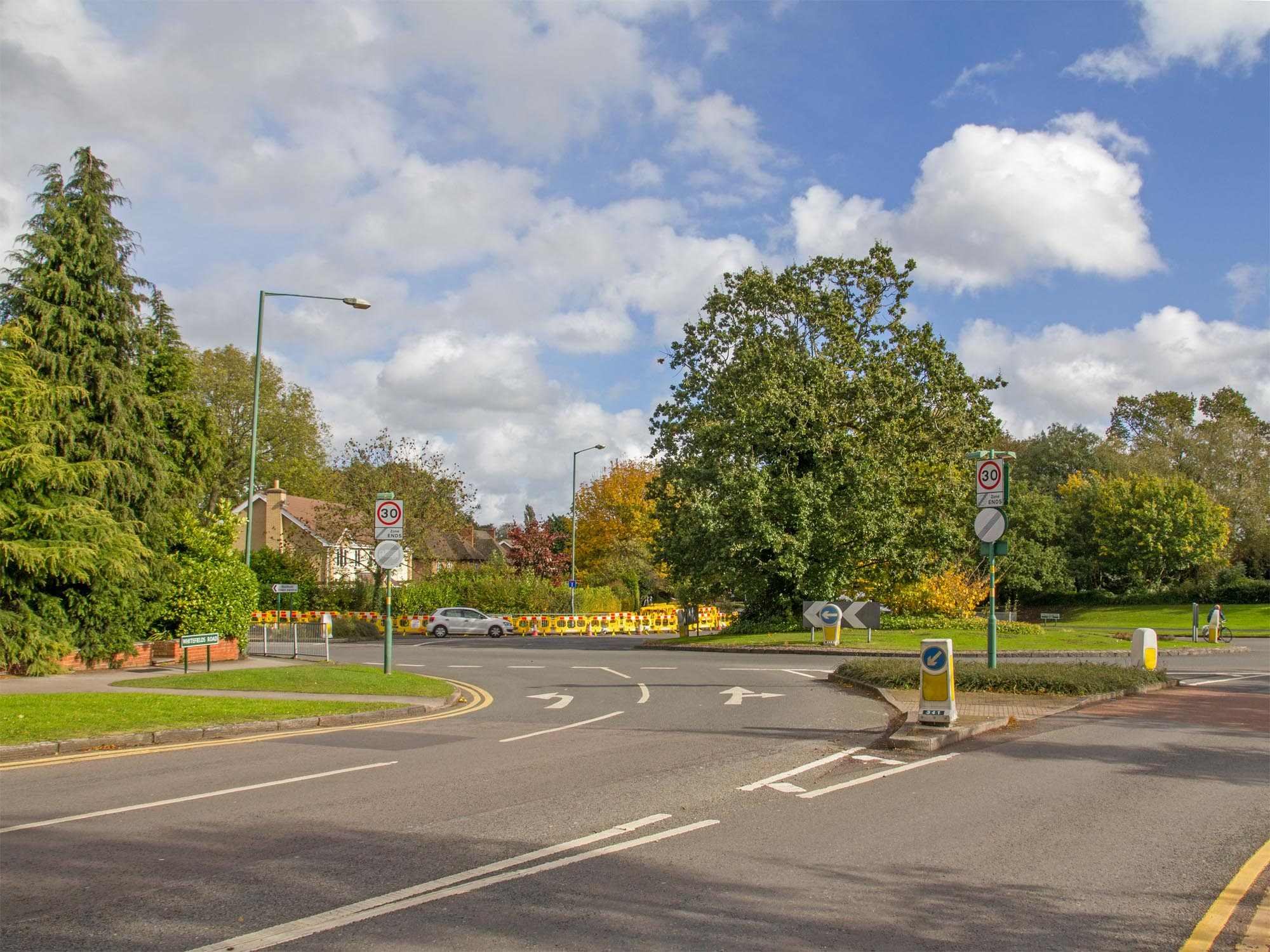
Monkspath Hall Road

== History ==
The name of "Munchespathe" was first recorded in 1153, when Roger de Ulehale of Tanworth was granted the manor and the adjoining lands by William de Beaumont, the third Earl of Warwick.

Monkspath is built on the former hamlet of Shelly. During the 13th and 14th centuries Shelly was a thriving settlement that connected Solihull and Henley-in-Arden by way of the Kings Highway (now Shelly Lane).

The first modern housing development was constructed between 1981 and 1986, in proximity to the landfill site known as Hay Lane, which served the area until the 1970s. The actual site of the landfill is now a park and amenity area. During preparations for this work, Monkspath Hall, built circa 1775, was illegally demolished, despite being Grade II listed. A court subsequently ordered its rebuilding.

The district expanded again in the mid-1990s and smaller-scale developments on newly-available land continue to be constructed well into the 2000s. Since 2000, the area has become increasingly commercialised with the expansion of the Monkspath Business Park, Solar Park and Fore Business Park.

Shelley Farm, one of the only surviving 19th-century buildings in the area has now been converted into a public house.

Sydenhams Moat, a moated site just south of Monkspath Bridge has been identified as the home of Simon De Mancetter.

"The manor of Little Monkspath is associated with Simon de Mancetter, who, in the 13th century, settled himself within the Lordship of Tanworth, where a certain large moated place (though the buildings be gone) beareth yet the name of his habitation"

== Transport ==
Monkspath is served by the No 5 bus route and the local railway station is Widney Manor Railway station.

== Education ==
The local primary schools include Monkspath Junior and Infant School, St. Alphege C of E Infant School, St. Alphege C of E Junior School, St. Augustine's Catholic Primary School and Our Lady of the Wayside Catholic Primary School.

Local secondary schools include Alderbrook School, Tudor Grange Academy and St Peter's Catholic School.

Further education is available at nearby Solihull Sixth Form College and Solihull College.

== Landmarks ==
The Corus Hotel (formerly the Regency Hotel), was constructed in 1870 by the Hobday family as Monkspath Priory. The property would later serve Solihull as the Regency Club, a Victorian style gentlemen's club and banqueting complex, before becoming a hotel in the late 20th century.

There is a building on the Stratford Road modelled after Thomas Jefferson's Monticello home in the United States of America. This building formerly housed a Jefferson's chain restaurant, for which the building was purpose built. It is now home to an Orleans Smokehouse restaurant. Incidentally, Thomas Jefferson had visited Stratford Upon Avon, around 18 miles south on the road, in 1786.
