= Wood End, Fillongley =

Village in Warwickshire, England

Coordinates: 52.4882°N 1.5694°W

Wood End
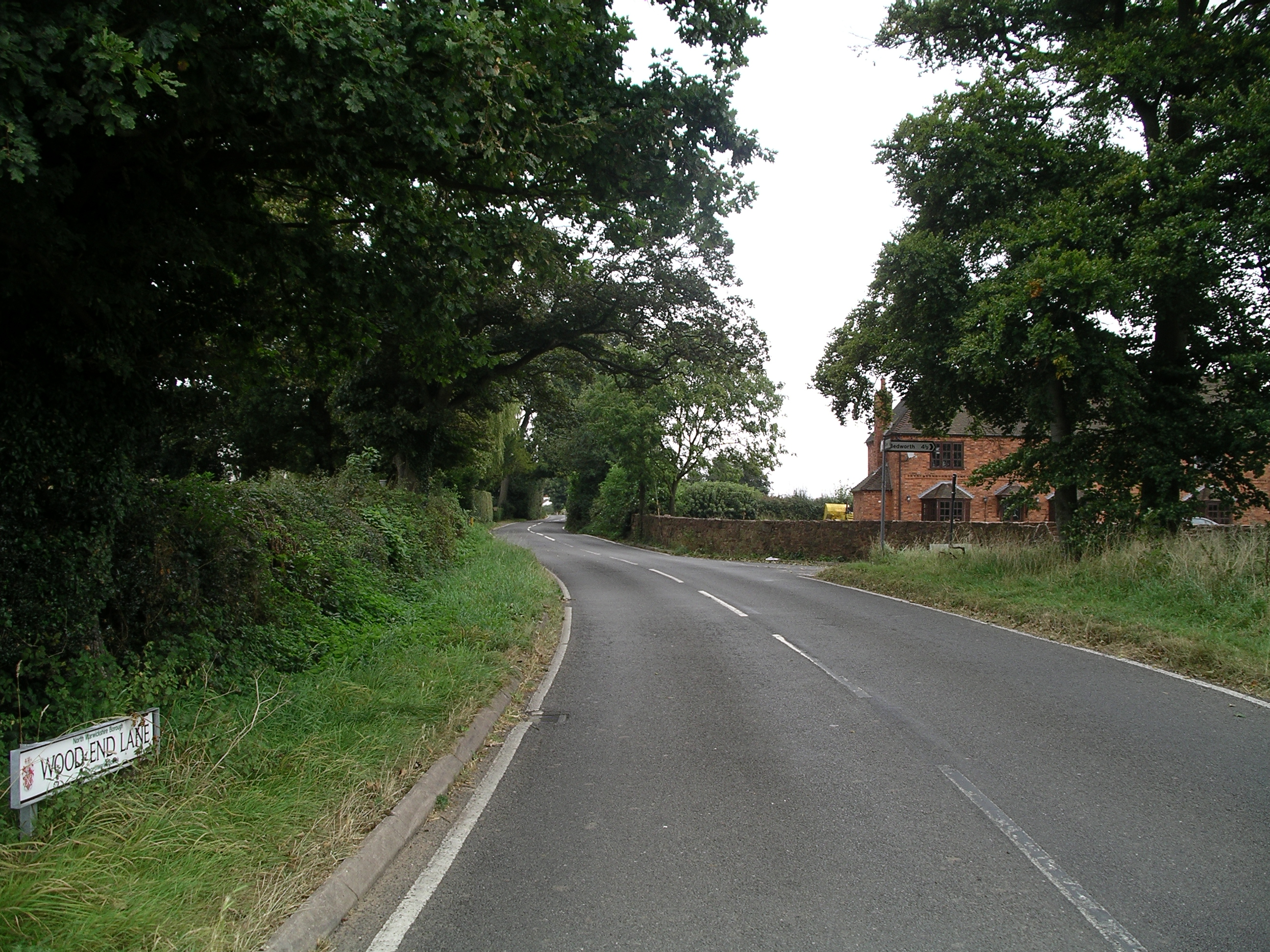
- Wood End Lane

- Location within Warwickshire
- Population: 50
- OS grid reference: SP 293 879
- Civil parish: Fillongley
- District: North Warwickshire
- Shire county: Warwickshire
- Region: West Midlands
- Country: England
- Sovereign state: United Kingdom
- Post town: Coventry
- Postcode district: CV7
- Dialling code: 01676
- Police: Warwickshire
- Fire: Warwickshire
- Ambulance: West Midlands
- UK Parliament: North Warwickshire

Wood End is a small village in Warwickshire, England, in the civil parish of Fillongley. It is situated north of Coventry. There is a public house called the "Weavers Arms".
