= Civil parishes in the West Midlands (county) =

Subnational entity

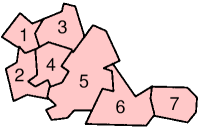
A map of the West Midlands, showing the Metropolitan Boroughs: (1) Wolverhampton; (2) Dudley; (3) Walsall; (4) Sandwell; (5) Birmingham; (6) Solihull; and (7) Coventry.

A civil parish is a subnational entity, forming the lowest unit of local government in England. There are 21 civil parishes in the ceremonial county of West Midlands, most of the county being unparished; Dudley, Sandwell, Walsall and Wolverhampton are completely unparished. At the 2001 census, there were 89,621 people living in the parishes, accounting for 3.5 per cent of the county's population.

== History ==
Parishes arose from Church of England divisions, and were originally purely ecclesiastical divisions. Over time they acquired civil administration powers.

The Highways Act 1555 made parishes responsible for the upkeep of roads. Every adult inhabitant of the parish was obliged to work four days a year on the roads, providing their own tools, carts and horses; the work was overseen by an unpaid local appointee, the Surveyor of Highways.

The poor were looked after by the monasteries, until their dissolution. In 1572, magistrates were given power to 'survey the poor' and impose taxes for their relief. This system was made more formal by the Poor Law Act 1601, which made parishes responsible for administering the Poor Law; overseers were appointed to charge a rate to support the poor of the parish. The 19th century saw an increase in the responsibility of parishes, although the Poor Law powers were transferred to poor law unions. The Public Health Act 1872 grouped parishes into rural sanitary districts, based on the poor law unions; these subsequently formed the basis for rural districts.

Parishes were run by vestries, meeting annually to appoint officials, and were generally identical to ecclesiastical parishes, although some townships in large parishes administered the Poor Law themselves; under the Divided Parishes and Poor Law Amendment Act 1882, all extra-parochial areas and townships that levied a separate rate became independent civil parishes.

Civil parishes in their modern sense date from the Local Government Act 1894 (56 & 57 Vict. c. 73), which abolished vestries; established elected parish councils in all rural parishes with more than 300 electors; grouped rural parishes into rural districts; and aligned parish boundaries with county and borough boundaries. Urban civil parishes continued to exist, and were generally coterminous with the urban district, municipal borough or county borough in which they were situated; many large towns contained a number of parishes, and these were usually merged into one. Parish councils were not formed in urban areas, and the only function of the parish was to elect guardians to poor law unions; with the abolition of the Poor Law system in 1930 the parishes had only a nominal existence.

The Local Government Act 1972 retained civil parishes in rural areas, and many former urban districts and municipal boroughs that were being abolished, were replaced by new successor parishes; urban areas that were considered too large to be single parishes became unparished areas.

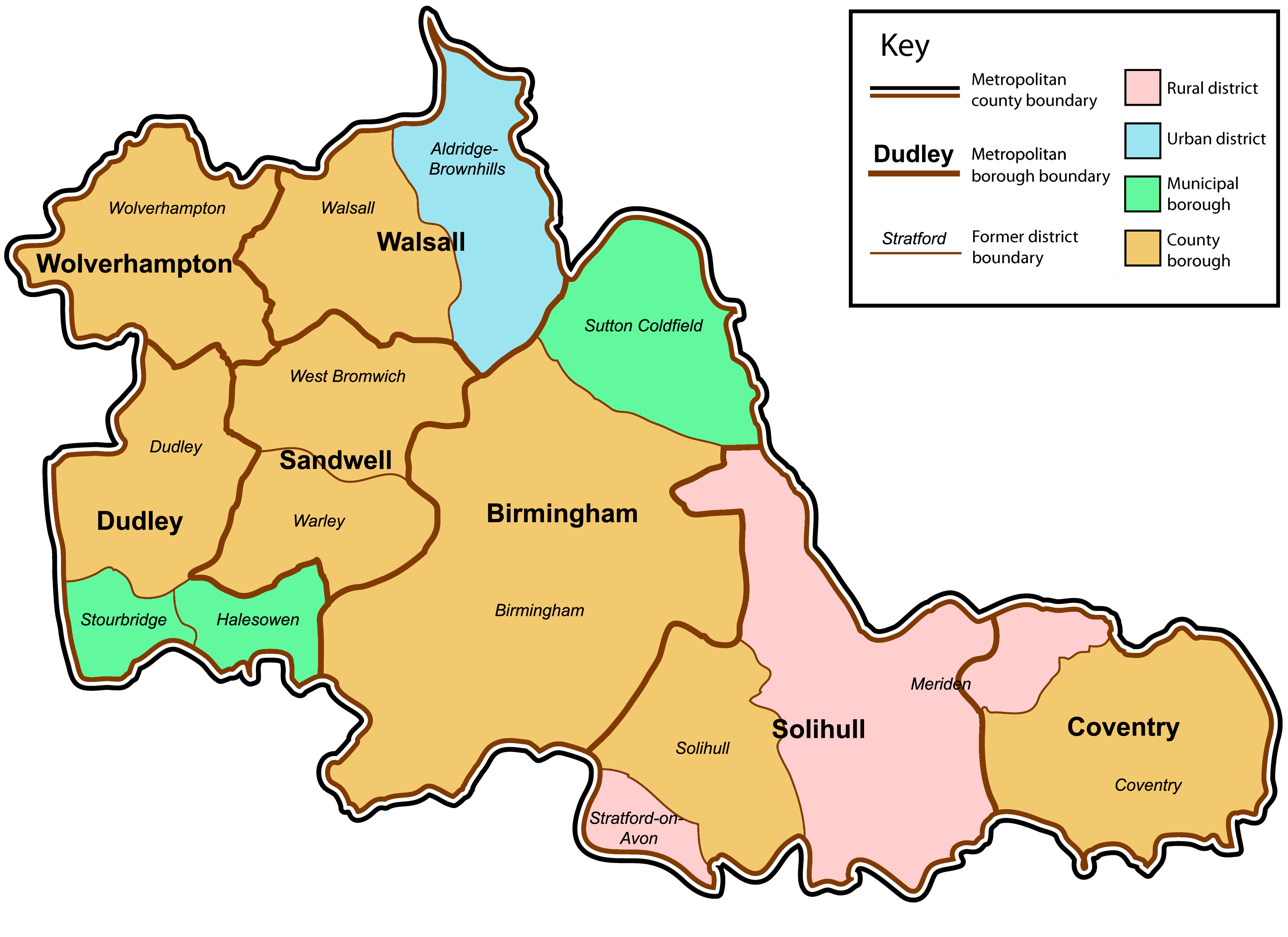
West Midlands showing the former local authorities

== The current position ==
Recent governments have encouraged the formation of town and parish councils in unparished areas, and the Local Government and Rating Act 1997 gave local residents the right to demand the creation of a new civil parish.

A parish council can become a town council unilaterally, simply by resolution; and a civil parish can also gain city status, but only if that is granted by the Crown. The chairman of a town or city council is called a mayor. The Local Government and Public Involvement in Health Act 2007 introduced alternative names: a parish council can now choose to be called a community; village; or neighbourhood council.

Civil parishes with town status

== List of civil parishes and unparished areas ==
Image	Name	Status	Population	District	Former local authority	Refs
	Birmingham	Unparished area	825,177	Birmingham	Birmingham; County Borough	
	New Frankley in Birmingham	Civil parish	7,890	Birmingham	Bromsgrove; Rural District	
	Sutton Coldfield	Town	144,020	Birmingham	Sutton Coldfield; Municipal Borough	
	Allesley	Civil parish	805	Coventry	Meriden; Rural District	
	Coventry	Unparished area	299,252 (including Finham)	Coventry	Coventry; County Borough	
	Finham	Civil parish		Coventry	Coventry; County Borough	
	Keresley	Civil parish	791	Coventry	Meriden; Rural District	
	Dudley	Unparished area	194,804	Dudley	Dudley; County Borough	
	Halesowen	Unparished area	55,591	Dudley	Halesowen; Municipal Borough	
	Stourbridge	Unparished area	54,760	Dudley	Stourbridge; Municipal Borough	
	Warley	Unparished area	139,855	Sandwell	Warley; County Borough	
	West Bromwich	Unparished area	143,049	Sandwell	West Bromwich; County Borough	
	Balsall	Civil parish	6,234 (including Chadwick End)	Solihull	Meriden; Rural District	
	Barston	Civil parish	499	Solihull	Meriden; Rural District	
	Berkswell	Civil parish	2,843	Solihull	Meriden; Rural District	
	Bickenhill and Marston Green	Civil parish	6,583	Solihull	Meriden; Rural District	
	Castle Bromwich	Civil parish	11,857	Solihull	Meriden; Rural District	
	Chadwick End	Civil parish		Solihull	Meriden; Rural District	
	Chelmsley Wood	Town	13,010	Solihull	Meriden; Rural District	
	Cheswick Green	Civil parish		Solihull	Stratford on Avon; Rural District	
	Dickens Heath	Civil parish		Solihull	Stratford on Avon; Rural District	
	Fordbridge	Town	8,748	Solihull	Meriden; Rural District	
	Hampton in Arden	Civil parish	1,787	Solihull	Meriden; Rural District	
	Hockley Heath	Civil parish	6,771	Solihull	Stratford on Avon; Rural District	
	Kingshurst	Civil parish	8,126	Solihull	Meriden; Rural District	
	Meriden	Civil parish	2,734	Solihull	Meriden; Rural District	
	Smith's Wood	Civil parish	10,943	Solihull	Meriden; Rural District	
	Solihull	Unparished area	119,382	Solihull	Solihull; County Borough	
	Tidbury Green	Civil parish		Solihull	Stratford on Avon; Rural District	
	Aldridge-Brownhills	Unparished area	83,159	Walsall	Aldridge-Brownhills; Urban District	
	Walsall	Unparished area	170,340	Walsall	Walsall; County Borough	
	Wolverhampton	Unparished area	236,582	Wolverhampton	Wolverhampton; County Borough	

== See also ==
- List of civil parishes in England
