= Meriden Gap =

Rural area in the West Midlands of England

Coordinates: 52.40°N 1.65°W

The Meriden Gap is a mostly rural area in the West Midlands, England, between Solihull and Coventry. It is a part of the wider West Midlands Green Belt, separating Coventry from the large West Midlands conurbation, which includes Birmingham and The Black Country.

The 'Gap' takes its name from the village central to the area, Meriden, although the largest settlement is the village of Balsall Common. The highest point lies at 185 metres (607 ft) above sea level on the northern edge of Boultbee's Wood north of the hamlet of Eaves Green, close to the West Midlands-Warwickshire border.

Most of the Gap is in the Metropolitan Borough of Solihull, a small area is in Warwickshire, and some of the northeastern part is in the City of Coventry limits. Other villages and hamlets in the gap include Hampton-in-Arden, Berkswell, Barston, Temple Balsall, Eastcote, Bradnocks Marsh, Millison's Wood, Eaves Green, Four Oaks, Fen End, Pickford Green and Corley Moor. The Gap is largely in the Meriden parliamentary constituency.

== Urban pressure ==
The planned expansion of Birmingham Airport outlines the need for construction on the greenbelt to allow the expansion to happen. Despite opposition to the expansion plans, the proposal was granted approval. A motorway service area between Junctions 3a and 7 on the M42 motorway has been proposed on several occasions.
