= Solihull Pop Chorus =

Solihull Pop Chorus is a community-based choir located in Solihull in the West Midlands.

Founded in 2013 by choir director Anya Small, Solihull Pop Chorus rehearses in three locations - Dickens Heath (Mondays), Knowle (Tuesdays) and Balsall Common (Wednesdays)- and has performed at venues and events across the West Midlands including Solihull School, Birmingham Town Hall The Solihull GlitterBall, the Tally Ho Sports and Social Club and the Dovehouse Theatre Solihull.

There are 180 adult members of the choir and around 30 children. The choir does not require auditions and comprises six voice parts (soprano 1s and 2s, alto 1s and 2s, basses and tenors), singing in three, four, five and six part harmonies.

The choir holds an annual concert which in 2016 was held at the Birmingham Town Hall. The choir is booked to perform there again in July 2017, 2018 and 2019.

On 17 April 2015 the choir performed for the Lord Mayor of London at a banquet at Mansion House in London.

Anya Small and a group of junior Pop Chorus members featured in the BBC Proms Sound of Music Medley, broadcast on BBC1 on 11 September 2015.

On 6 November 2016 Solihull Pop Chorus recorded three songs at Abbey Road Studios in London.
