= Packwood House =

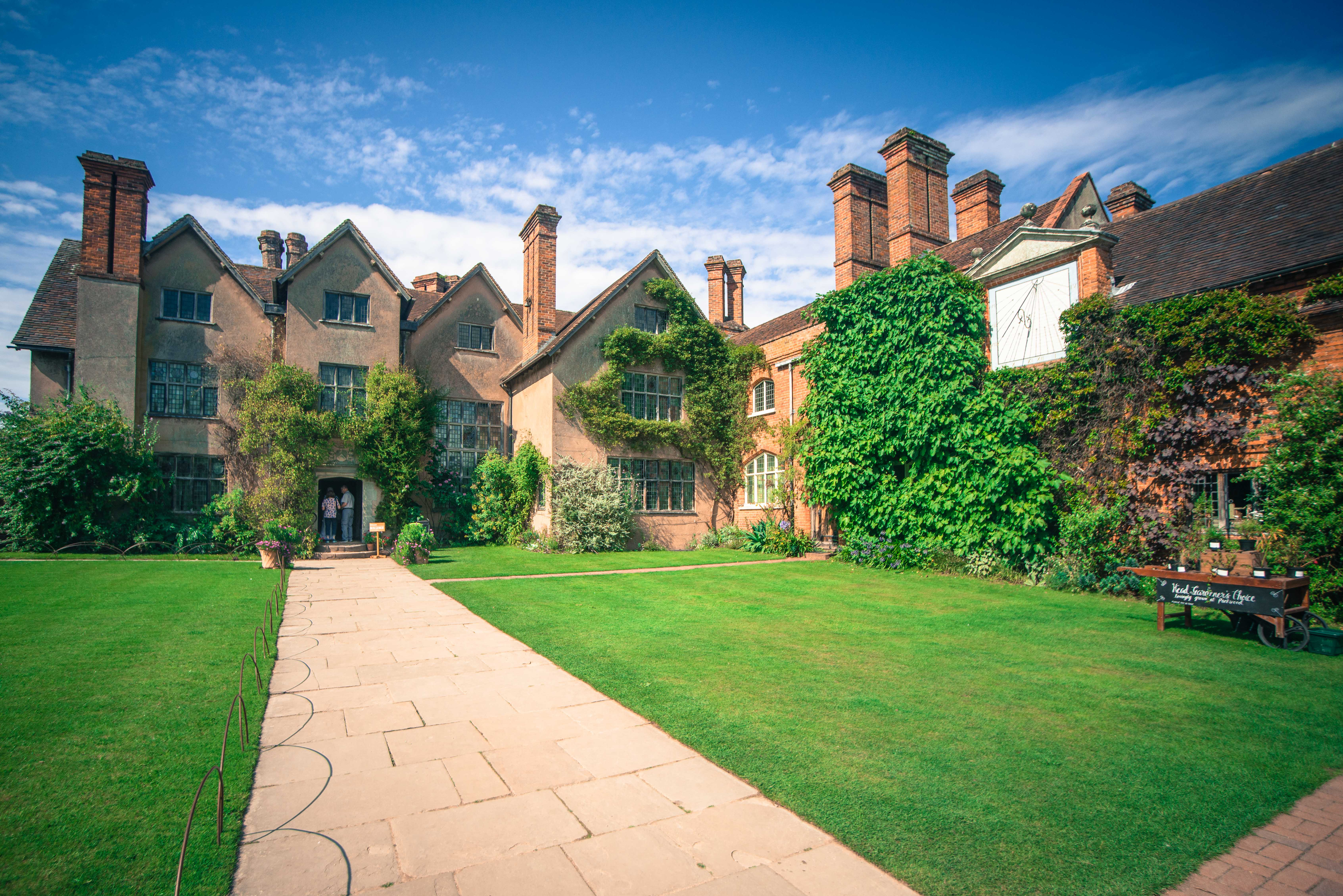
- The eastern front of the house
- Interactive map of Packwood House
- 52°20′51″N 01°44′47″W
- Type: Country house
- Location: Lapworth, Warwickshire, England

History
- Built: 16th century

Site notes
- Restored: 20th century
- Owner: National Trust
- Website: http://www.nationaltrust.org.uk/packwood-house

Listed Building – Grade I
- Official name: Packwood House and outbuildings to north east
- Designated: 11 April 1967
- Reference no.: 1184240

Listed Building – Grade II
- Official name: Stable block approximately east north east of Packwood House and outbuildings to north east
- Designated: 11 April 1967
- Reference no.: 1035116

Listed Building – Grade II
- Official name: Walls, gate piers and gates forming forecourt, and walls, gazebos, gate piers and gates forming South Garden to Packwood House
- Designated: 11 April 1967
- Reference no.: 1364999

National Register of Historic Parks and Gardens
- Official name: Packwood House
- Type: Grade II*
- Designated: 1 February 1986
- Reference no.: 1001194

Packwood House is a timber-framed Tudor manor house in Packwood on the Solihull border near Lapworth, Warwickshire. Owned by the National Trust since 1941, the house is a Grade I listed building. It has a wealth of tapestries and fine furniture, and is known for the garden of yews.

== History ==
The house began as a modest timber-framed farmhouse constructed for John Fetherston between 1556 and 1560. The last member of the Fetherston family died in 1876. In 1904 the house was purchased by Birmingham industrialist Alfred Ash. It was inherited by Graham Baron Ash (Baron in this case being a name not a title) in 1925, who spent the following two decades creating a house of Tudor character. He purchased an extensive collection of 16th- and 17th-century furniture, some obtained from nearby Baddesley Clinton. The great barn of the farm was converted into a Tudor-style hall with sprung floor for dancing, and was connected to the main house by the addition of a Long Gallery in 1931.

In 1941, Ash donated the house and gardens to the National Trust in memory of his parents but continued to live in the house until 1947 when he moved to Wingfield Castle.

=== Gardens ===
The famous Yew Garden containing over 100 trees was laid out in the mid-17th century by John Fetherston, the lawyer. The clipped yews are supposed to represent "The Sermon on the Mount". Twelve great yews are known as the "Apostles" and the four big specimens in the middle are 'The Evangelists'. A tight spiral path lined with box hedges climbs a hummock named "The Mount". The single yew that crowns the summit is known as "The Master". The smaller yew trees are called "The Multitude" and were planted in the 19th century to replace an orchard.

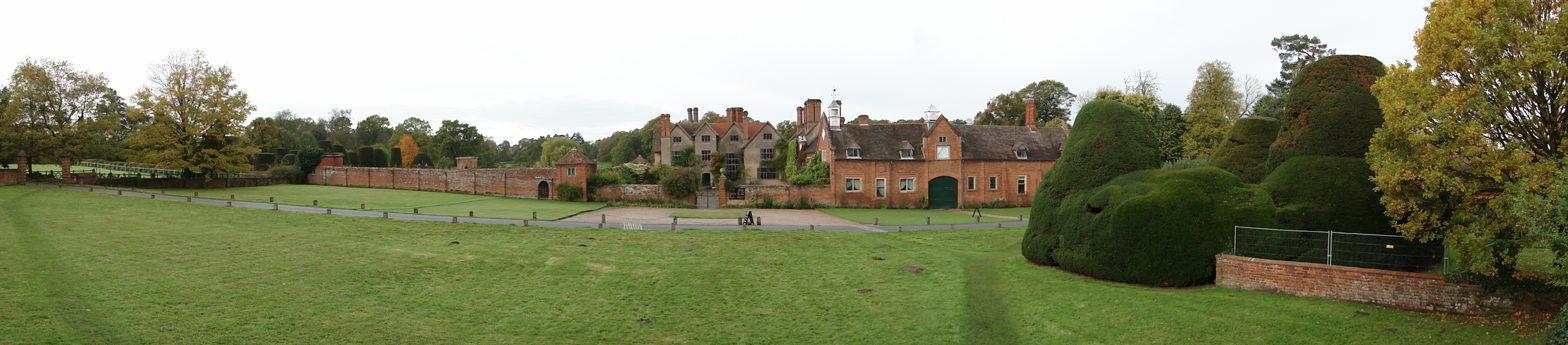

The Yew Garden is entered by raised steps and a wrought-iron gate. The garden path follows an avenue of trees, which leads up a spiral hill where a wooden seat is placed beneath a yew tree. This vantage point provides views of the house and the Yew Garden.

Some of the yews at Packwood are taller than 50 feet (15 m). The soil on the estate has a high level of clay, which is detrimental to the trees during wet periods. As a result, parts of the garden are often closed to the public while restoration work is undertaken The house and gardens are open to the public throughout the whole year as of 2026.

== Gallery ==
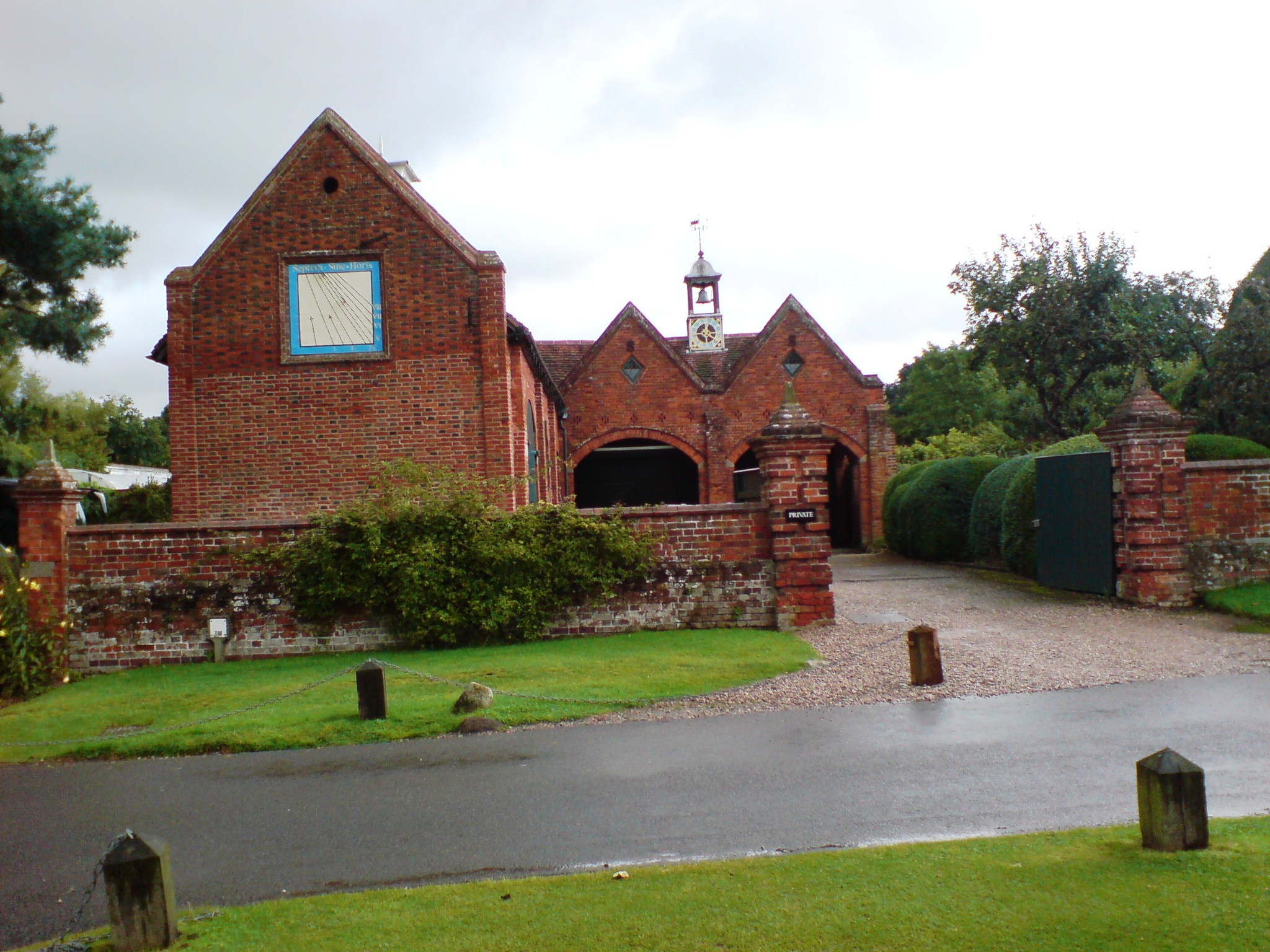
The stable block

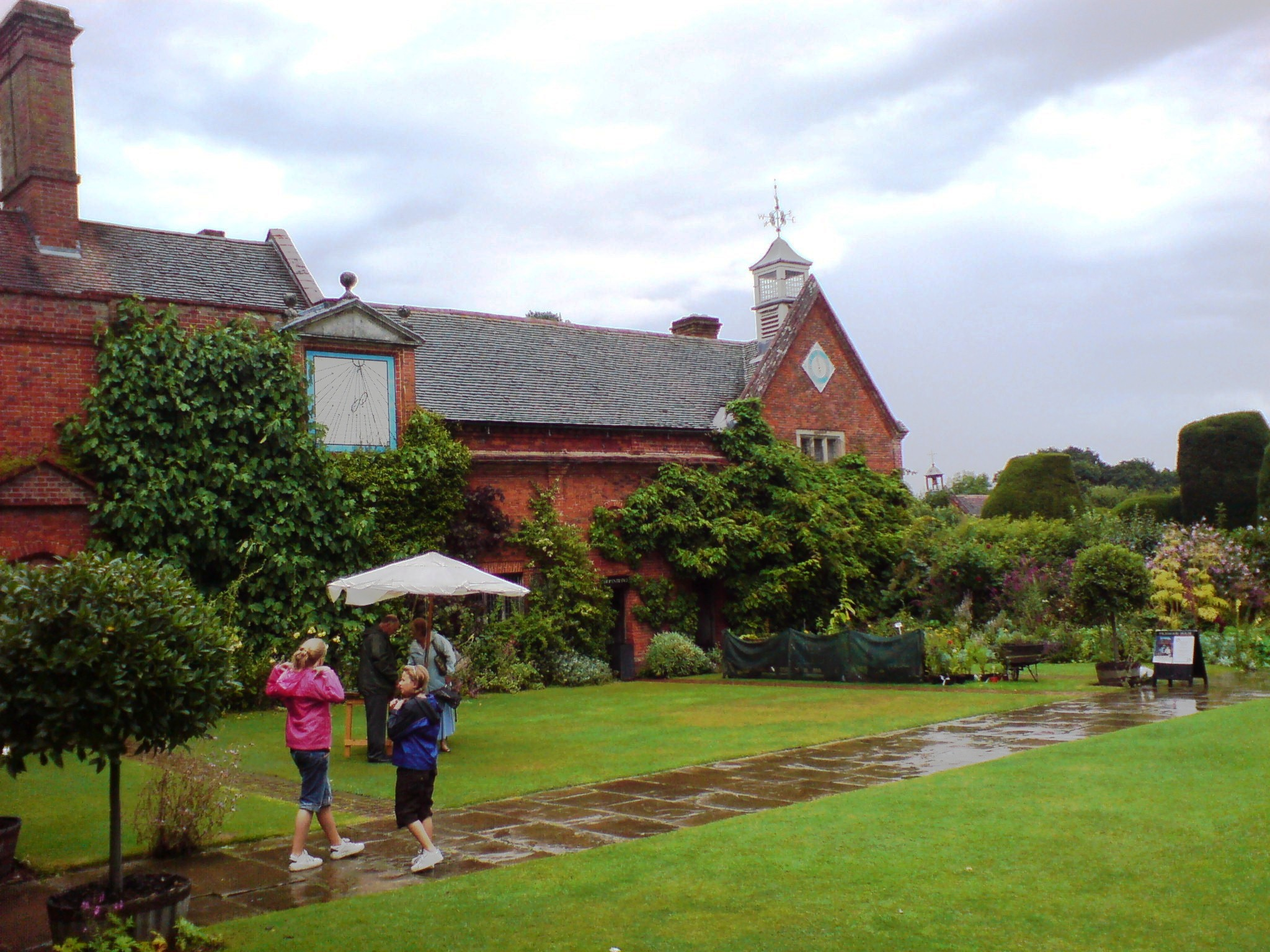
The view from the garden

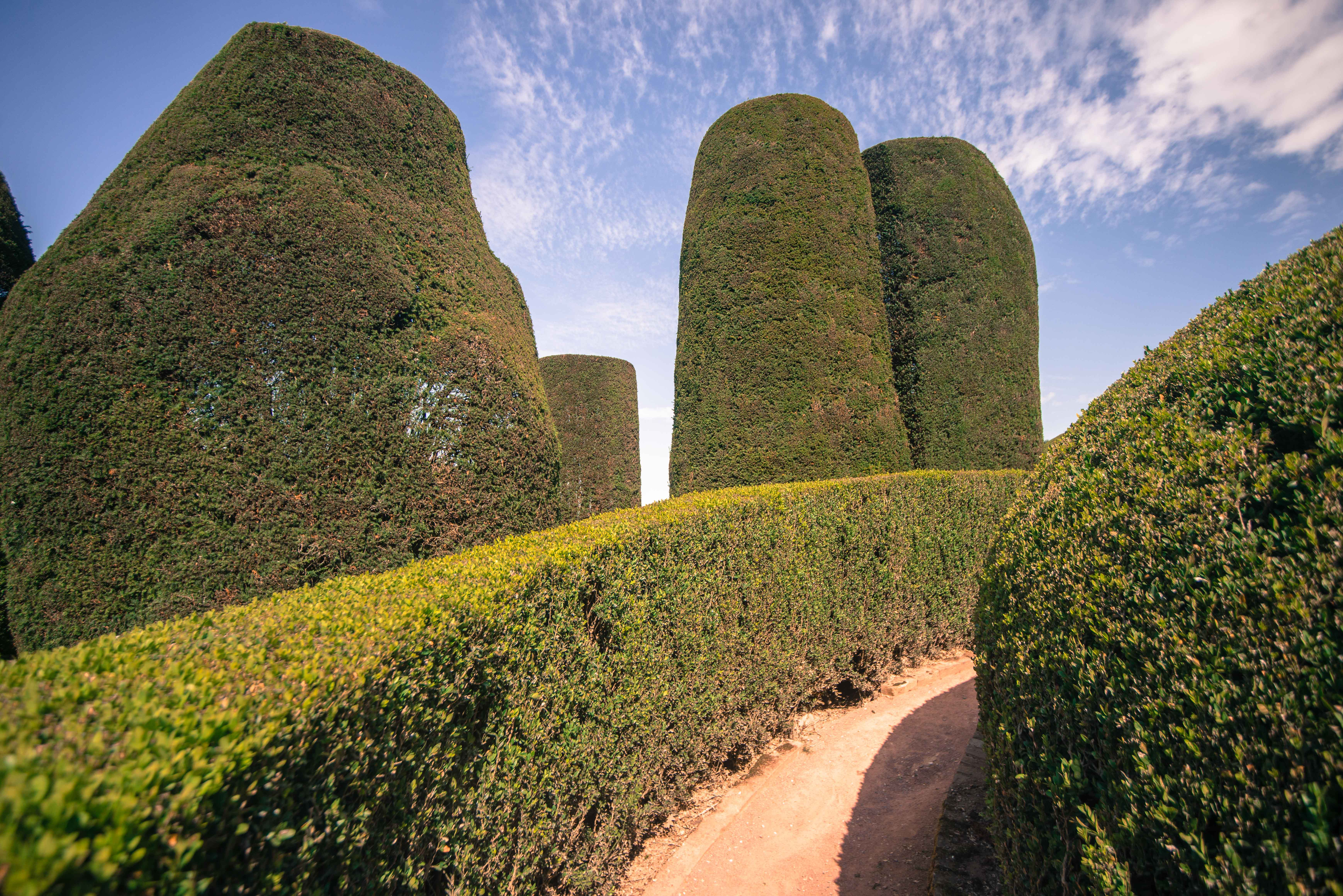
Yew Garden from the path to the Mount

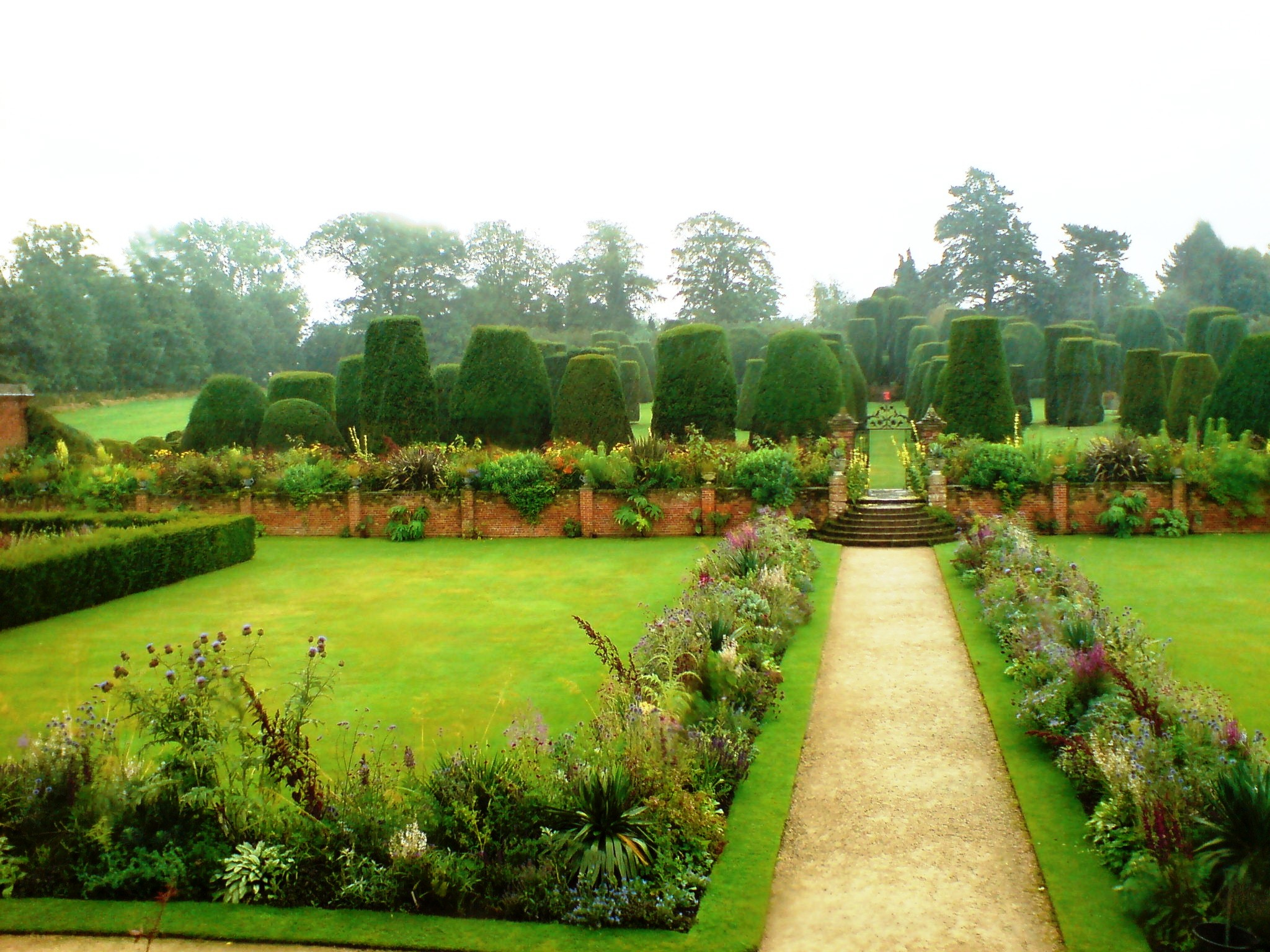
Yew trees looking south towards Sermon on the Mount

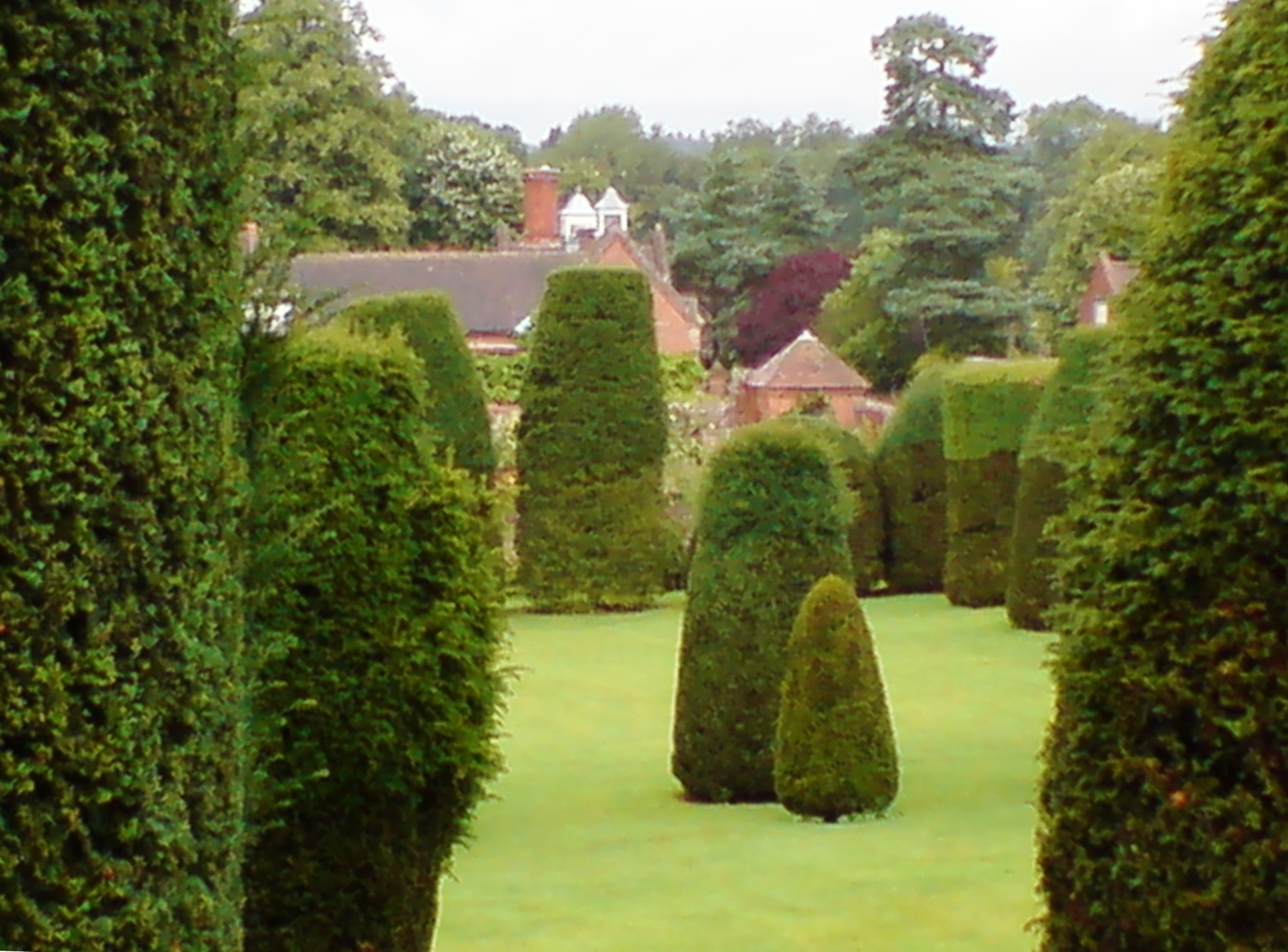
View of the house and yew trees from The Mount

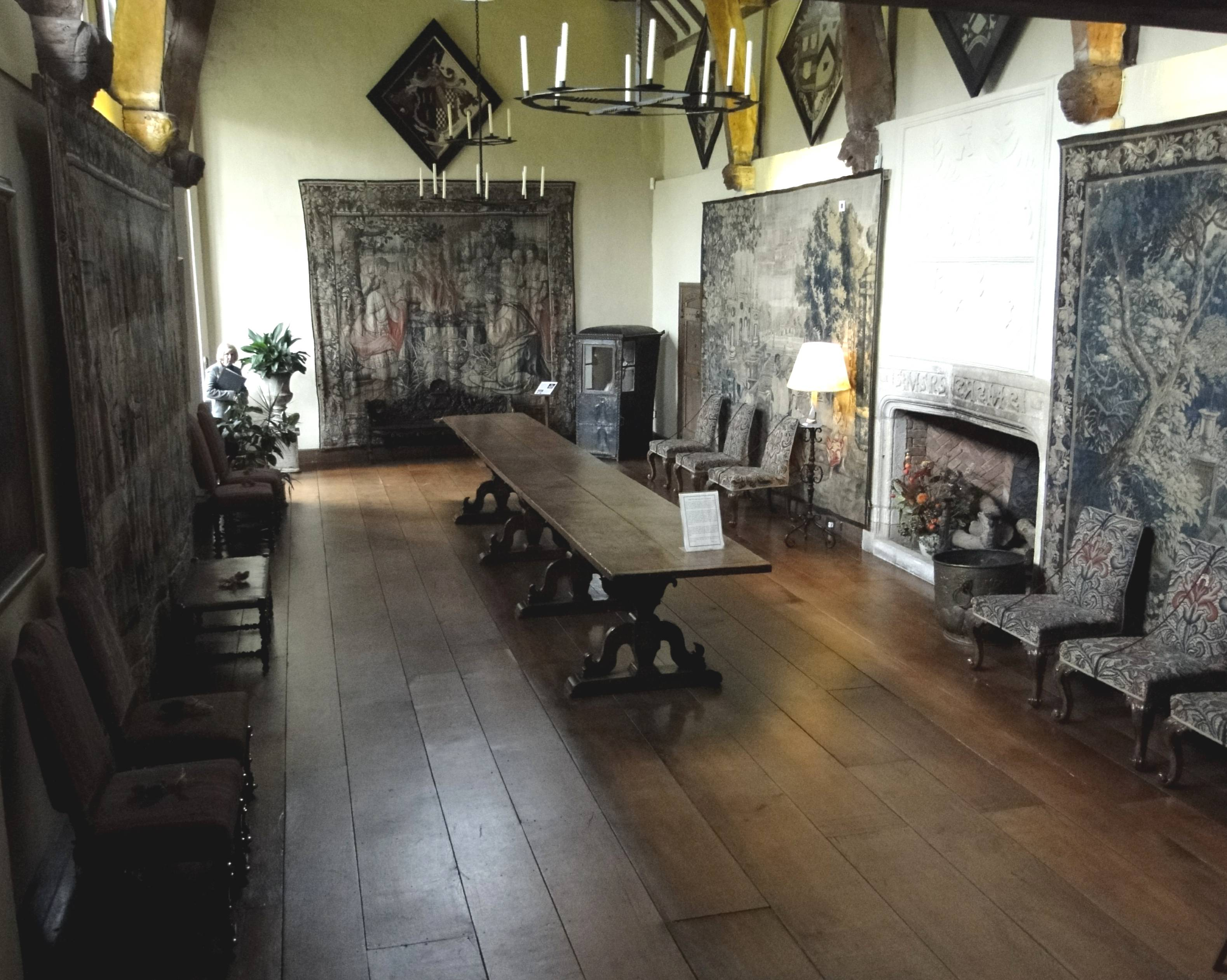
The Great Hall

== Sources ==
- Allesley and Coundon Wedge Conservation Society (2009), Baron Ash and Packwood House, Allesley, West Midlands: Gateway Gardens Trust, archived from the original on 3 September 2011
- Blagg, Anthony (2010), Packwood House, Worcestershire: Topiary in the United Kingdom
- Gateway Gardens Trust (2007), Gardens in Warwickshire (PDF), Pwllheli, Gwynedd: Gateway Gardens Trust, archived from the original (PDF) on 26 July 2011
- National Trust (2010), 2010 Handbook, Swindon, Wiltshire: National Trust for Places of Historic Interest or Natural Beauty, ISBN 978-0-7078-0410-1
- Staveley, Andy (2009), Packwood House, Birmingham, West Midlands: BirminghamUK
- TourUK (2009), Packwood House, Bideford, Devon: Just Tour Limited, archived from the original on 13 October 2016
