= Balsall Common Viaduct =

- Coordinates: 52.3978°N 1.6418°W
- Carries: High Speed 2
- Crosses: Station Road, Bayleys Brook, Heart of England Way, floodplain
- Locale: Balsall Common

Characteristics
- Material: Concrete
- Total length: 425 m (1,394 ft)
- Width: 14.6 m (48 ft)
- Height: Deck c. 10 m (33 ft) above ground
- No. of spans: 17

Rail characteristics
- No. of tracks: 2
- Track gauge: 1,435 mm (4 ft 8 1/2 in)
- Electrified: 25 kV 50 Hz AC

History
- Architect: Weston Williamson
- Designer: Mott MacDonald and Systra
- Constructed by: Balfour Beatty VINCI
- Construction end: Planned early 2027

Statistics
- Daily traffic: High-speed passenger trains

Location
- Interactive map of Balsall Common Viaduct

Balsall Common Viaduct is a railway viaduct under construction in Balsall Common, England, that will carry the High Speed 2 railway line.

The finalised design of the viaduct was issued in February 2023; it will be a mostly concrete structure, comprising 16 piers and a bridge deck approximately 10 metres (33 feet) above ground. The viaduct is planned to finish in early 2027.

== Background ==
During design development, the initial Environmental Statement scheme reduced the proposed viaduct's length from 450 m (1,480 ft) to 250 m (820 ft), linked to a 160 m (520 ft) retaining wall on the Berkswell side of its the north-western end. A later design extended the viaduct to 350 m (1,150 ft), removing the need for the retaining wall and avoiding the need to realign a public right of way. The submitted design increased the viaduct to 425 m (1,394 ft), citing improved flood management.

Following a year long community consultation process, the finalised design for the viaduct was released during February 2023. The process was criticised by some residents and politicians for a lack of alternative options for the viaduct being presented.

In May 2023, the British government overruled two rejections by Solihull Metropolitan Borough Council for construction lorries bringing materials for the viaduct's works driving on village roads. The rejections had been made on safety grounds, alleging that the roads lacked sufficient width and that mitigating measures had not been satisfactory. The council approved the viaduct design on 6 September 2023.

The project is being led by HS2's main works contractor, Balfour Beatty VINCI, supported by a design joint venture of Mott MacDonald and Systra, with architects Weston Williamson.

== Design ==
The Balsall Common Viaduct will carry the railway over Station Road, Bayleys Brook, the Heart of England Way and the local floodplain. It will have a length of 425 m (1,394 ft), be supported by 16 piers, and have a bridge deck approximately 10 m (33 ft) above ground. The viaduct is designed to require low levels of maintenance and to last for 120 years.

The viaduct will have a concrete deck and precast concrete multi-beams, with 16 piers at 25 m (82 ft) spans. The structure is 14.6 m (48 ft) wide and has 5.7 m (19 ft) clearance beneath the piers for vehicles. Its height reaches 14 m (46 ft) above ground where the noise barrier is at its full height, with the overhead catenary system above.

The design sought to reduce its visual impact through the use of slender piers and reflective acoustic parapets. Design refinements reduced the size of the piers by up to 17% for single piers and 28% for double piers, giving the viaduct a lighter appearance and reducing embodied carbon. The piers use smooth concrete on the outer arms and a roughcast concrete pattern in the central recess, intended to reduce their visual mass.

The parapets act as safety barriers and noise barriers, integrated on each side of the deck. Three parapet heights are used: 1.2 m (3.9 ft), 3.1 m (10 ft) and 4.1 m (13 ft), measured above the rail. The 3.1 m (10 ft) and 4.1 m (13 ft) parapets incorporate acoustic panels on the rail facing side, while the 1.2 m (3.9 ft) parapet functions as a safety barrier for maintenance and inspection.

In 2024, further community engagement resulted in the public choosing a "weave" pattern for the viaduct, intended to reference the history of textile production in the area, additional woodland for its landscaping, and for the upper faces of the parapets to be finished in polished concrete to reflect the sky and surrounding environment.

Environmental mitigation measures include wet woodland and mixed native woodland planting, woodland edge planting for screening, hedgerow planting to improve wildlife connections, and marshland habitat around and beneath the viaduct. Bayleys Brook will be realigned to increase habitat for fish, aquatic invertebrates and potentially water vole. The Kenilworth Greenway will also be extended to Station Road on the south-eastern side of the existing railway line, with a further extension towards Lavender Hall.

== Construction ==
The deck beams, parapets and noise barriers were precast, while the concrete piers were poured in situ to their full height to avoid horizontal construction joints.

By March 2026, all 16 piers had been completed and bridge beams had been installed over Station Road. By June 2026, the deck beams were complete, with parapet installation to begin and continue into 2027. Further works included partial removal of temporary works stone platforms, landscaping and installation of noise barriers.
