= Barston =

Coordinates: 52°23′59″N 1°41′50″W

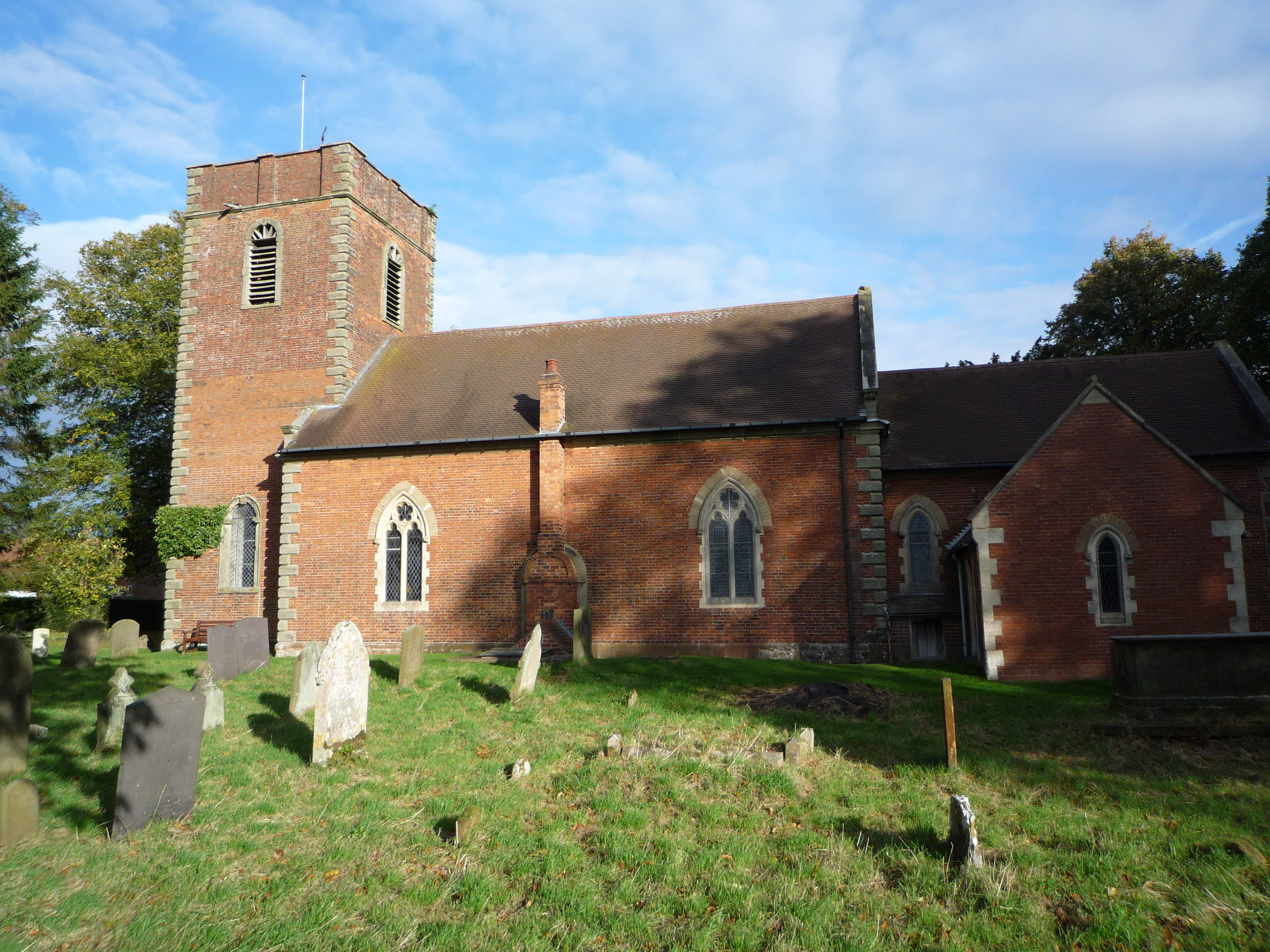

- Location within the West Midlands
- Population: 553 (2011)
- OS grid reference: SP207780
- Civil parish: Barston
- Metropolitan borough: Solihull
- Metropolitan county: West Midlands
- Region: West Midlands
- Country: England
- Sovereign state: United Kingdom
- Post town: SOLIHULL
- Postcode district: B92
- Police: West Midlands
- Fire: West Midlands
- Ambulance: West Midlands
- UK Parliament: Meriden

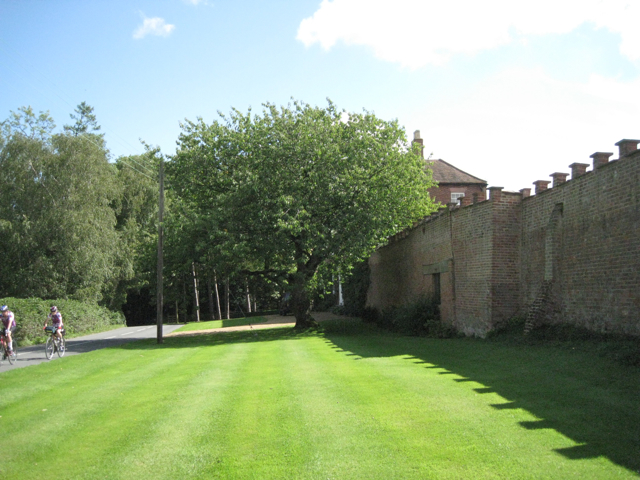
Barston Hall, Barston Lane frontage

Barston is a village and civil parish in Metropolitan Borough of Solihull in the West Midlands of England. It is approximately 4.5 miles (7 km) east of Solihull and is located inside a large meander of the River Blythe, at the western edge of the Meriden Gap, and midway between the far larger villages of Balsall Common and Hampton-in-Arden. The nearest large city is Birmingham, 11 miles (18 km) away to the west. According to the 2001 UK Census, the parish had a population of 499, increasing to 533 at the 2011 Census.

Barston is a historic village with many historic buildings, some of which are timber-framed. The Church of St. Swithin is a Church of England church which dates from 1721, and is built on the site of an earlier church. The village also possesses two pubs, The Bulls Head and The Malt Shovel, and about 50 residential properties. The Barston Memorial Institute, opposite the Bulls Head, hosts many village activities with a Friday night youth club and regular Art Classes as well as the Barston WI and U3A meetings. There is no bus service or any other form of public transport in the village, although an abandoned bus stop still exists at the end of the central road of Barston, Oak Lane, which is left over from an old-school service from the 1970s and 1980s. Next to the bus stop is an old-fashioned red phone box.

The footballer Robbie Keane owned a house in Barston from 1999 to 2000, whilst playing for Coventry City F.C.
