= Chadwick End =

Village in Warwickshire, England

Coordinates: 52.35558°N 1.69896°W

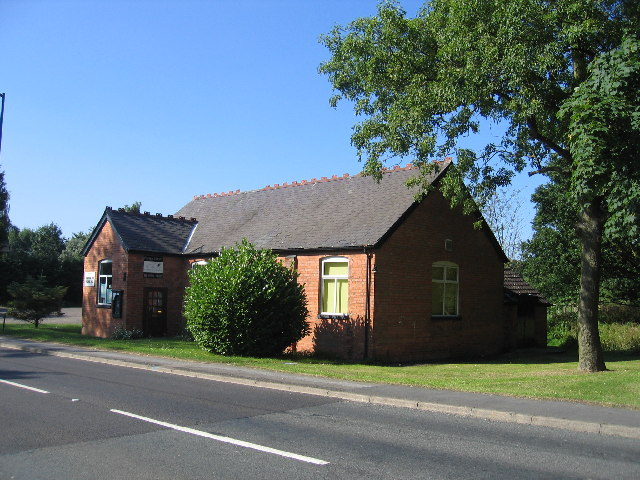
- Chadwick End village hall

- Location within the West Midlands
- OS grid reference: SP206731
- Civil parish: Chadwick End
- Metropolitan borough: Solihull
- Metropolitan county: West Midlands
- Ceremonial county: Warwickshire
- Region: West Midlands
- Country: England
- Sovereign state: United Kingdom
- Post town: Solihull
- Postcode district: B93

Chadwick End is a small village which straddles the border of Warwickshire and the West Midlands Metropolitan Borough of Solihull, situated 3 miles (5 km) southeast of the large village of Knowle and 8 miles northwest of Warwick. It is almost contiguous with the slightly larger village of Baddesley Clinton, which lies a half-mile to the south on the A4141 route.

The name Chadwick means 'farm near a spring', and the village remains a farming community. Unusually for a small settlement, the south side of the village lies within Warwickshire with the north side lying in the Borough of Solihull. The civil parish was split from part of Balsall on 1 April 2014. There have since been no moves to bring the village under the administrative auspices of a single authority.

A mile from the village centre lies Chadwick Manor and its former 280-acre Estate, built in 1875 by the architect Edward Holmes (1832-1909). It was home to John Alfred Watson, High Sheriff of Warwickshire. In 1935 the Manor was bought by a syndicate that included the Scottish racehorse owner and breeder Captain. Norman "Norrie" Stewart~MacKay (1895-1980) who chose to buy it for himself in 1950. Later the Manor was converted into a country house hotel and subsequently into luxury flats.

The former Poor Clares convent on Rising Lane was founded in 1850; it has been converted into private flats since its closure in 2011.
