= Packwood, England =

Coordinates: 52.353°N 1.752°W

Packwood
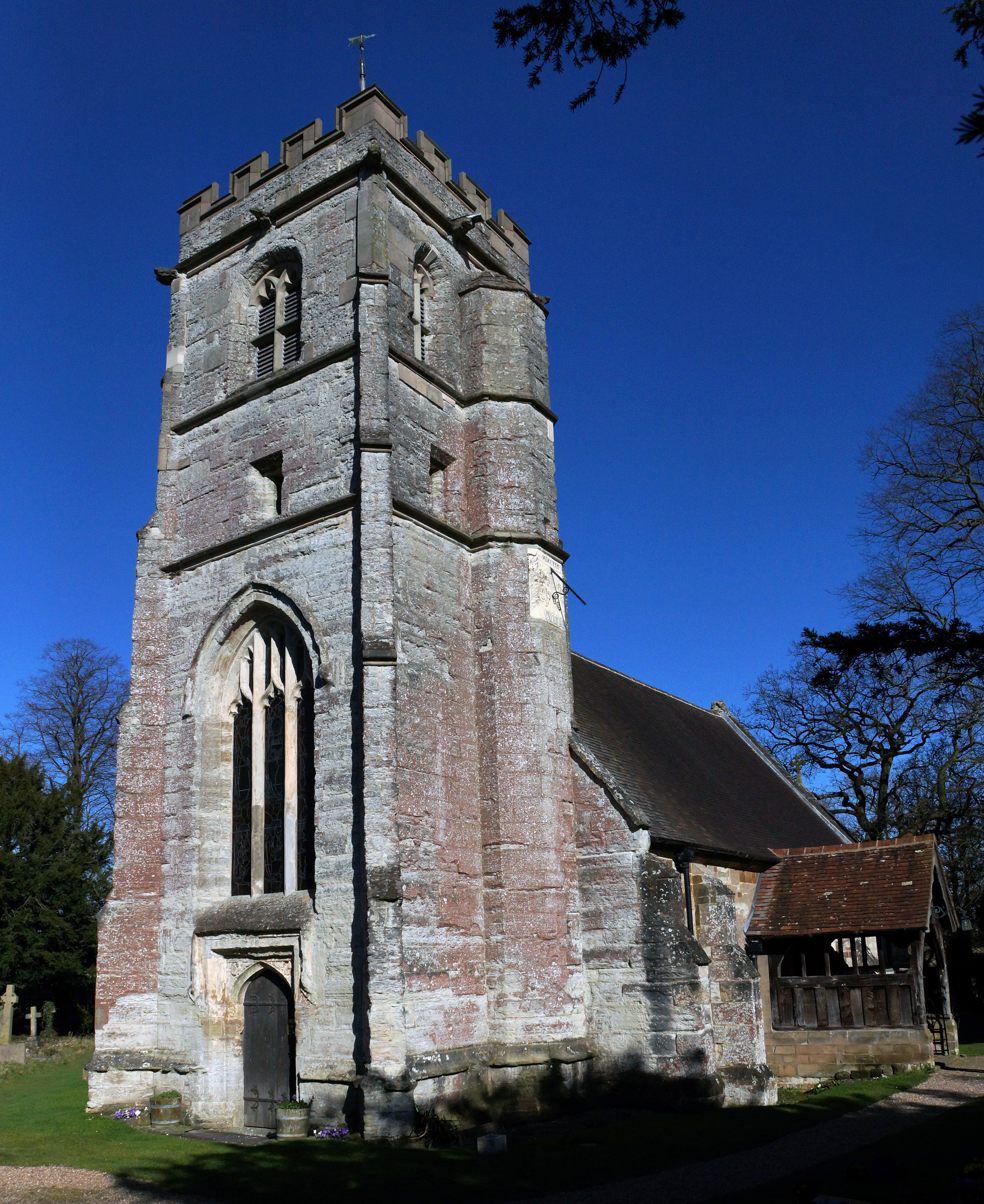
- St Giles church

- Location within the West Midlands
- Civil parish: Lapworth
- Metropolitan borough: Solihull
- District: Warwick
- Shire county: Warwickshire
- Metropolitan county: West Midlands
- Region: West Midlands
- Country: England
- Sovereign state: United Kingdom

Packwood is a medieval settlement and former civil parish of 1760 acres, now in the counties of the West Midlands and Warwickshire, England. In 1194 the ownership of Packwood estate was disputed between the Bishop of Coventry and the Prior of Coventry. In 1931 the parish had a population of 990. The small rural area includes the Grade I listed sixteenth century National Trust property Packwood House, the separate Packwood Hall (Grade II listed) and its adjacent church of St Giles.

== St Giles Church ==
St Giles is a Grade II* listed building church alongside Packwood Hall. The nave and chancel date from the thirteenth century and the tower around 1500. The north transept was added around 1704. The church contains memorials to the Featherston family of Packwood Hall. The tower was financed by Nicholas Brome, lord of the manor of nearby Baddesley Clinton, in atonement for killing the local priest who was attacking his wife.

== Governance ==
Packwood was anciently a detached chapelry belonging to the parish of Wasperton, but was being treated as a separate parish by the early sixteenth century. Packwood was included in the Solihull Rural District from 1894 until 1932.

On 1 April 1932 the parish was abolished. The majority of the parish, including the parish church, Packwood Hall and parts of Dorridge and Hockley Heath, was transferred to the new urban district of Solihull. The southern part of the parish, including Packwood House, was added to the parish of Lapworth. The area around the church and Packwood Hall was subsequently transferred from Solihull to Lapworth in 1964. In 1974 Solihull became part of the larger Metropolitan Borough of Solihull in the West Midlands county, whilst Lapworth became part of the Warwick District in Warwickshire; as such the area of the former parish of Packwood now straddles the two counties.
