= Millison's Wood =

Hamlet in the West Midlands, England

Coordinates: 52°25′57″N 1°36′32″W

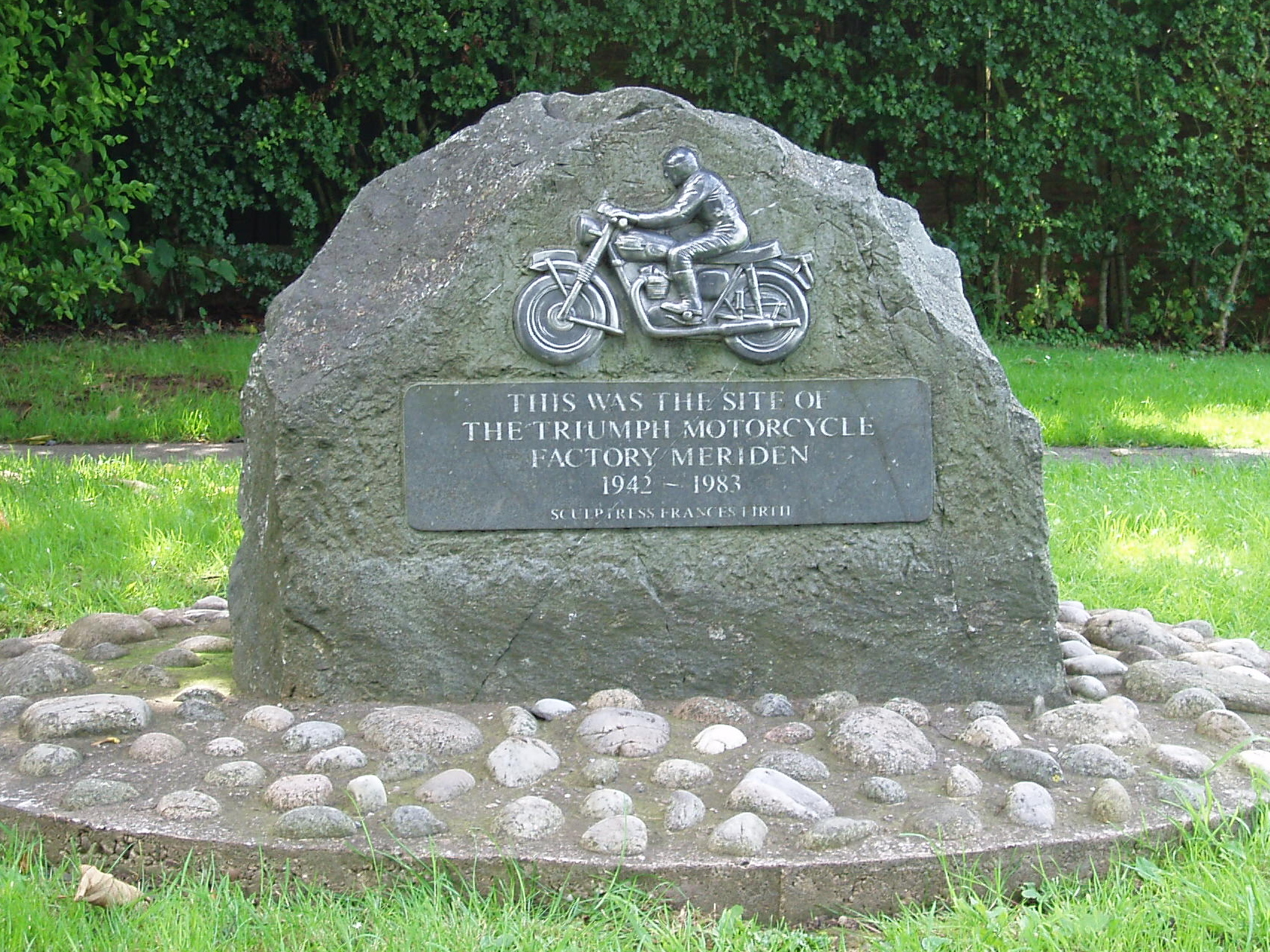
Meriden Triumph Factory memorial in Millison's Wood

Millison's Wood is a large English hamlet in the parish of Meriden, situated 1.5 miles (2.4 km) east of the village of Meriden (the closest neighbouring settlement) and 5.5 miles (8.9 km) northwest of Coventry, with which it forms part of the borough border.

A purely residential settlement, it is located at the eastern extremity of the Metropolitan Borough of Solihull in the West Midlands, just off the westbound A45 road.

From 1941 until 1983, the Triumph motorcycle factory was located here, although it was usually known as the "Meriden" factory from the larger village nearby. A plaque on the B4104 Birmingham Road, just outside Bonneville Close, was unveiled on 7 October 2005 commemorating the site's former use.

Meriden Business Park lies directly adjacent to Millison's Wood on the B4102, yet lies just across the border in Coventry.

The Millison's Wood Nature Reserve is located near the village.
