= Tidbury Green =

Village and civil parish in the West Midlands, England

Coordinates: 52.3806°N 1.8538°W

Tidbury Green is a village and civil parish within the Metropolitan Borough of Solihull in the county of West Midlands in England. The population of the civil parish as taken at the 2011 census was 1,130.

Historically, Tidbury Green belonged to the county of Warwickshire. At the beginning of the 20th century, the area was Tidbury Green Farm. It was owned by H. A. W. (Henry Aylesbury Walker) Aylesbury, having passed into his hands from the ownership of the Roberts family in the 1700s and early 1800s. The estate was sold in 1918 after Aylesbury's death, an example of land redistribution caused by the First World War.

After the Second World War it had a thriving Vegetable Growers Association.

In 1995 a new school replacing the former dilapidated buildings at Tidbury Green School, was built, including a village hall, which is a centre used for many different local groups and clubs.
