= Silhill =

Place in West Midlands, England

Coordinates: 52.421°N 1.777°W

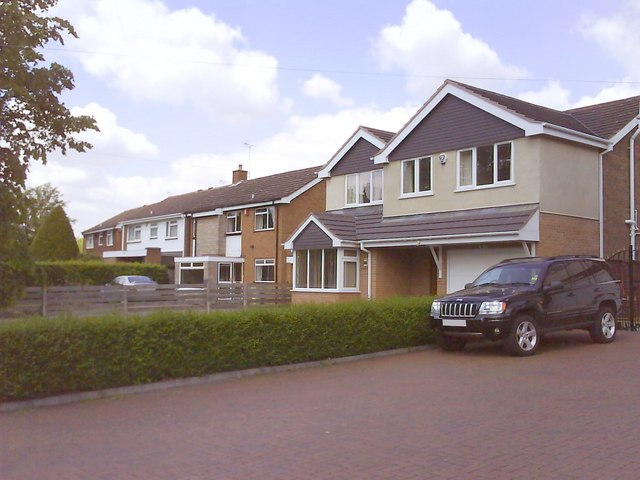
Houses that are built on the site of the old Silhill Hall

Silhill is an electoral ward in Solihull, West Midlands, England.

== Demographics ==
The population at the 2021 United Kingdom census was 12,558.

== Sports ==
- Silhillians RUFC

== Listed buildings ==
- 701-707 Warwick Road
- Bradford House

== Politics ==
Silhill elects councillors to Solihull Metropolitan Borough Council

Silhill will be part of the Meriden and Solihull East constituency in the 2023 Periodic Review of Westminster constituencies.
