= Metropolitan Borough of Solihull =

Coordinates: 52.40880°N 1.78092°W

- Metropolitan borough
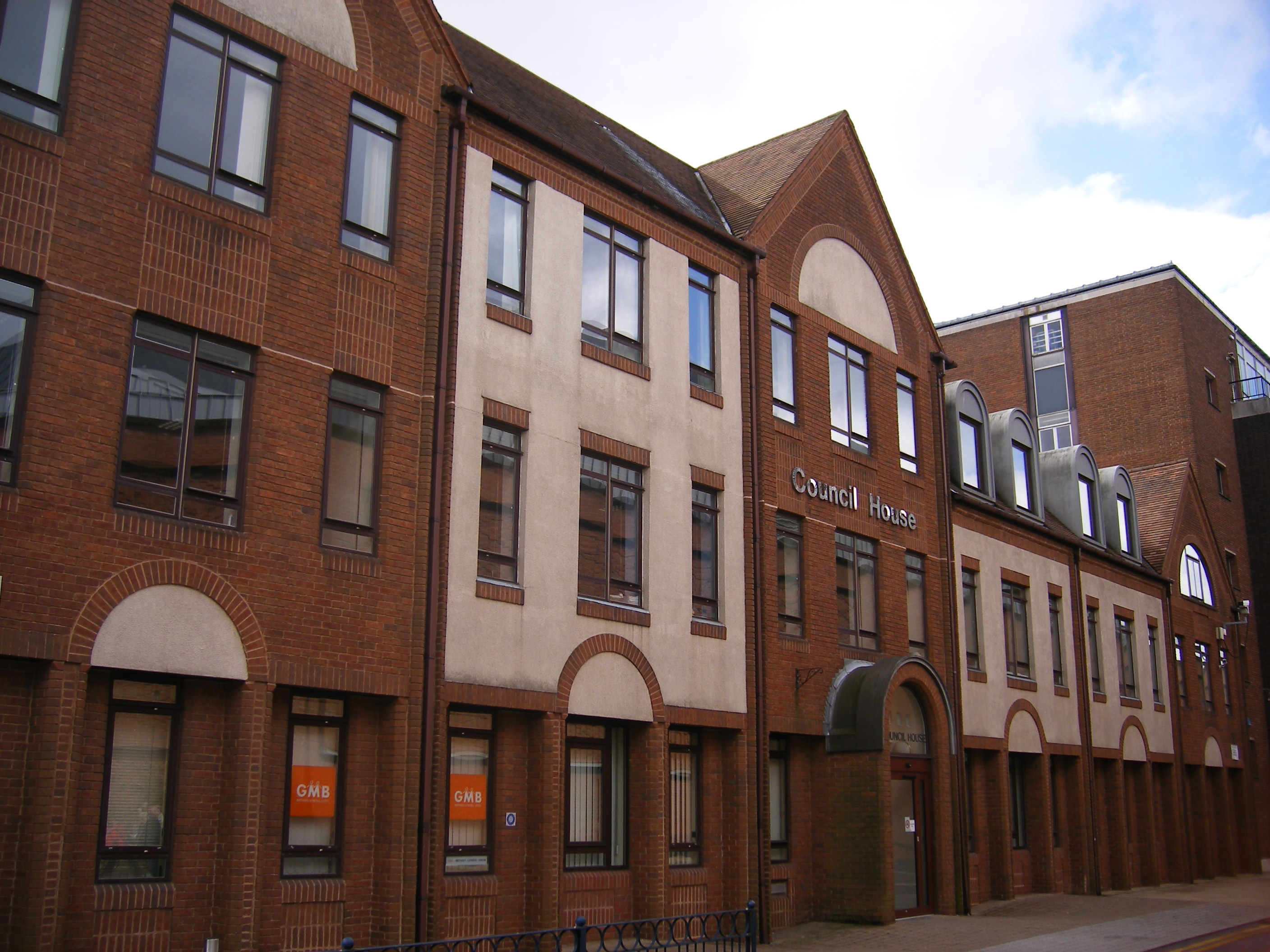
- Solihull Council House

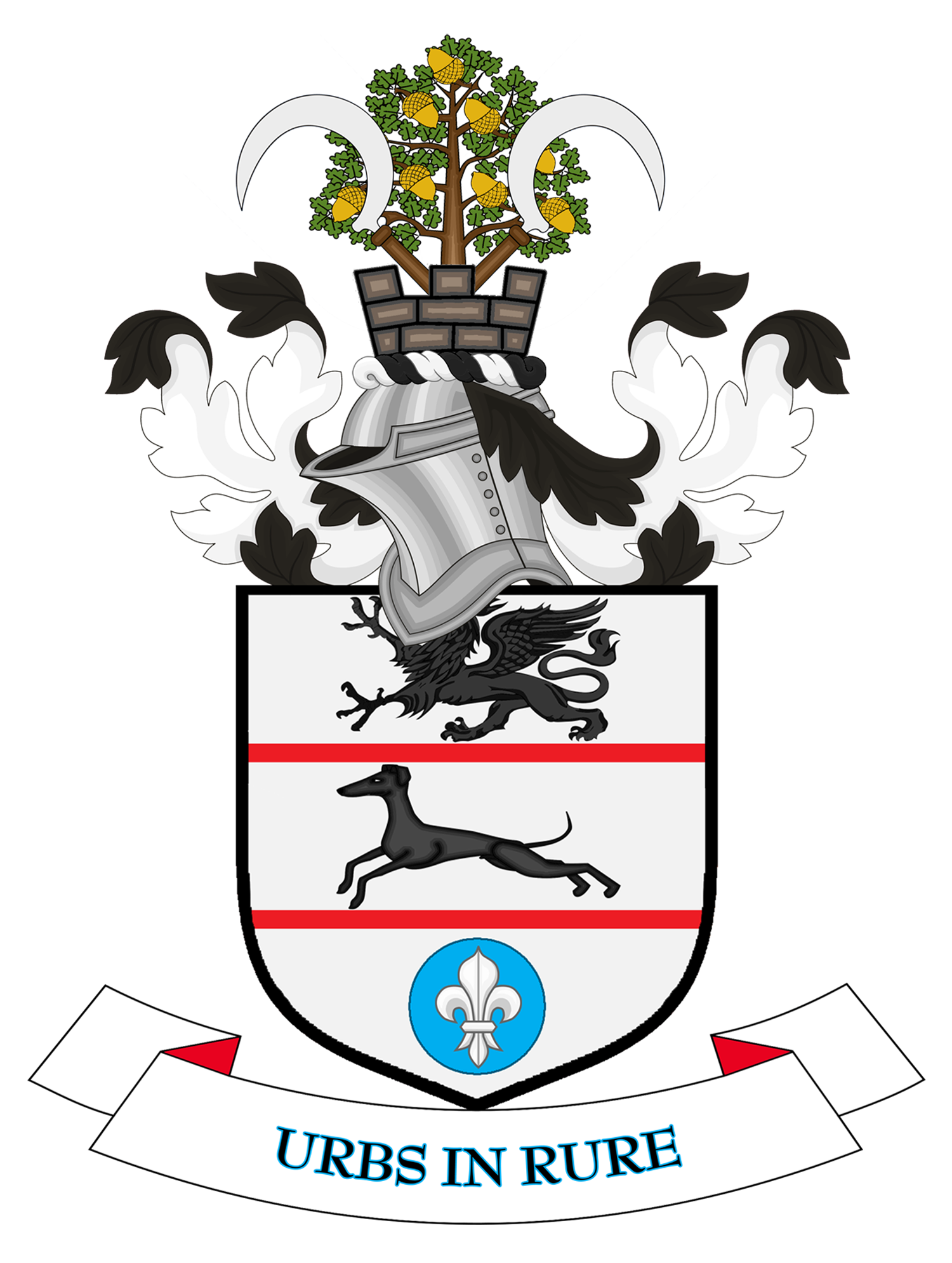
- Coat of Arms of the Borough Council

- Shown within the West Midlands and England
- Sovereign state: United Kingdom
- Constituent country: England
- Region: West Midlands
- Historic county: Warwickshire
- Metropolitan county and combined authority: West Midlands
- Admin. HQ: Solihull

Government
  - Type: Metropolitan borough
  - Body: Solihull Metropolitan Borough Council
  - Leadership: Leader and cabinet
  - MPs: Neil Shastri-Hurst (C); Saqib Bhatti (C)

Area
  - Total: 69 sq mi (178 km^{2})
  - Rank: 153rd

Population (2024)
  - Total: 221,242
  - Rank: Ranked 88th
  - Density: 3,220/sq mi (1,240/km^{2})
- Time zone: UTC+0 (Greenwich Mean Time)
  - Summer (DST): UTC+1 (British Summer Time)
- ISO 3166 code: GB-SOL
- ONS code: 00CT (ONS); E08000029 (GSS)
- Ethnicity: 89.1% White (85.8% White British); 6.5% Asian; 2.2% Mixed Race; 1.5% Black; 0.6% Other
- Website: solihull.gov.uk

The Metropolitan Borough of Solihull, often colloquially just called Solihull, (Note: Very common name for the borough, but the town Solihull is only one of multiple towns in the borough, which is named for Solihull due to it being the largest town.) is a metropolitan borough in the east of the West Midlands county, England. It is named after its largest town, Solihull, from which Solihull Metropolitan Borough Council is based. Much of the borough is considered to be part of the West Midlands conurbation, and the borough's area was historically in Northwestern Warwickshire. For Eurostat purposes it is a NUTS 3 region (code UKG32) and is one of seven boroughs or unitary districts that comprise the "West Midlands" NUTS 2 region.

Much of the large residential population in the north of the borough centres on the communities of Castle Bromwich, Marston Green and Smith's Wood as well as the towns of Chelmsley Wood and Fordbridge. In the south are the towns of Shirley and Solihull. The borough also contains the large villages of Knowle, Dorridge, Meriden and Balsall Common, all of which are outside of the West Midlands conurbation, to its east.

In 2011, Solihull formed part of the Greater Birmingham & Solihull Local Enterprise Partnership along with neighbouring authorities Birmingham, Bromsgrove, Cannock Chase, East Staffordshire, Lichfield, Redditch, Tamworth and Wyre Forest. This however was discontinued in the 2020s.

== History ==
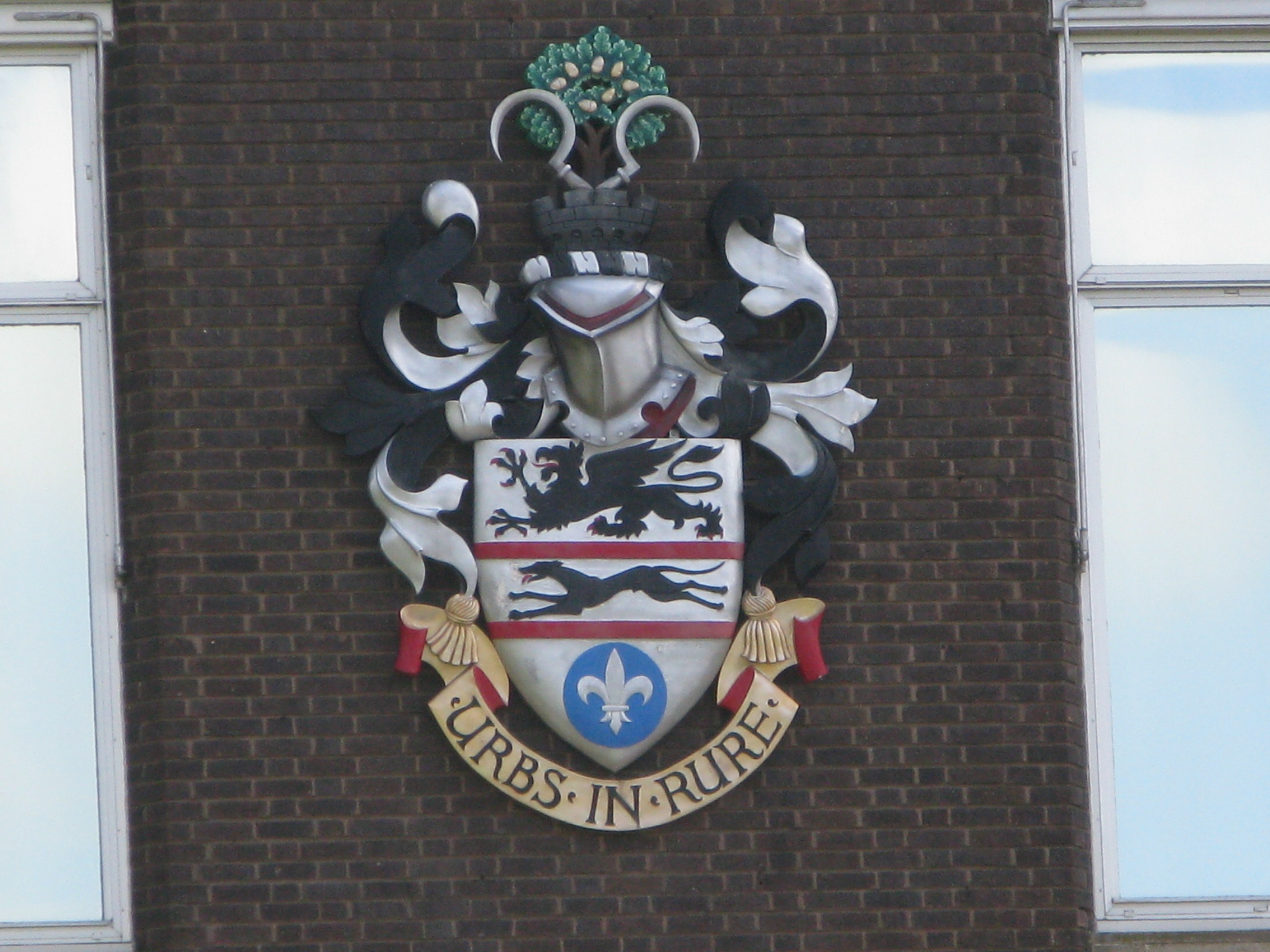
The coat of arms of Solihull Metropolitan Borough Council

Solihull probably derived its name from a 'miry or muddy' or soily hill. The parish church was built on a hill of stiff red marl, which turned to sticky mud in wet weather.

Solihull was an ancient parish, covering the town itself and adjoining rural areas, including Shirley. Solihull was made the centre of a poor law union in 1836, covering eleven parishes: Baddesley Clinton, Balsall, Barston, Elmdon, Knowle, Lapworth, Nuthurst, Packwood, Solihull, Tanworth and Yardley. Yardley was in Worcestershire and the rest of the parishes were in Warwickshire.

Such poor law unions formed the basis for later local government areas. In 1872 poor law unions also became rural sanitary districts for the parts of their areas without urban authorities; there were no urban authorities in the Solihull union. In 1894 rural sanitary districts were converted into rural districts with their own elected councils under the Local Government Act 1894. The 1894 Act split districts which straddled county boundaries, and so Yardley became a separate rural district (which was later absorbed into Birmingham in 1911), whilst the Warwickshire parishes from the Solihull poor law union became the Solihull Rural District. The 1894 Act also created parish councils for rural parishes, including Solihull.

The Solihull Rural District and the Solihull Parish Council were abolished in 1932. A new urban district of Solihull was created; the parishes of Solihull, Elmdon, Knowle, Nuthurst, Packwood and Sheldon (Note: The parish of Sheldon that was abolished in 1932 was just the south-eastern rural parts of the old parish; the north-western part of the parish including the settlement of Sheldon itself had been added to Birmingham in 1931.) were abolished and most of their combined area became the new urban district, subject to various adjustments to the boundaries with neighbouring parishes. The parts of the old Solihull Rural District not included were added to neighbouring rural districts.

Expansion continued and Queen Elizabeth II granted a charter in 1954 making Solihull into a Municipal Borough; ten years later it was given the status of County Borough. Reorganisation of boundaries and council responsibilities in 1974 created the Metropolitan Borough of Solihull by the merger of the Solihull County Borough and most of the Meriden Rural District, which forms the main rural part of the borough and county. It included Balsall Common, Barston, Berkswell, Bickenhill, Castle Bromwich, Chelmsley Wood, Elmdon, Fordbridge, Hampton in Arden, Hockley Heath, Kingshurst, Knowle, Marston Green, Meriden, Olton, Smiths Wood, Solihull, Shirley and Temple Balsall.

In 1986 the Solihull borough effectively became a unitary authority when the West Midlands County Council was abolished. It remains part of the West Midlands for ceremonial purposes, and for functions such as police, fire and public transport. There is some support to return the borough to Warwickshire for ceremonial purposes, as was the case when the County of Avon was abolished and Bath was returned to Somerset. There were also complaints that Solihull was not involved in the design of the Warwickshire flag in 2016.

== Geography ==
The borough is bordered by the M6 and the M40 and split by the M42 which divides the urban centre of the borough from the rural south and east. The borough's transport links have led to a number of established large businesses being based in the borough, such as Land Rover, the National Exhibition Centre and Birmingham Airport. A short automatic light transport system links the airport to the nearby Birmingham International railway station. Around three-quarters of the borough is greenbelt and a large proportion of that is worked farmland. The borough shares its boundaries with Birmingham to the west and north, Coventry to the east, Warwickshire to both the north and south and Worcestershire to the south west. The borough contains a sizeable rural area known as the Meriden Gap (after the village of Meriden) which serves as a green belt separating the Birmingham conurbation from the city of Coventry. Parts of Solihull neighbour the suburbs of Minworth and Hall Green. Parts also lie close to (but not contiguous with) the town of Coleshill and city of Coventry.

=== Council ===
Elections to Solihull Metropolitan Borough Council are held in three out of every four years, with one third of the 51 seats on the council being elected at each election. Since the 2011 election The Conservative Party has had a majority on the council. However, in the 2026 election, while The Conservative Party still holds the most seats, no parties have a majority.

At the 2026 election to the council, the following members were returned:

Year	Conservative	Reform UK	Liberal Democrats	Green	Independent	Labour
2026	24	17	6	4	0	0

For election purposes the council is divided up into the following wards based on civil parishes. Each ward is represented by three councillors:

- Bickenhill
- Blythe
- Castle Bromwich
- Chelmsley Wood
- Dorridge and Hockley Heath
- Elmdon
- Kingshurst and Fordbridge
- Knowle
- Lyndon
- Meriden
- Olton
- Shirley East
- Shirley South
- Shirley West
- Silhill
- Smith's Wood
- St Alphege

== Coat of arms ==
The constituent parts of the borough's coat of arms are:

- Battlements, sickles and an oak tree with golden acorns, which represent the rural and agricultural nature of the Forest of Arden.
- The Black Griffin is taken from the arms of the Earls of Aylesford, who are associated with Meriden.
- The Silver Fleur-de-lys comes from the Digby family, who were associated with Fordbridge.
- The Black Greyhound is taken from the arms of the Greswolds, the family who built the 15th century house called the Manor House in the High Street, Solihull.

A stylised version of the coat of arms can be seen on the top left of Solihull Metropolitan Borough Council's website pages, and the official, heraldic version appears on a dedicated page on the same site – external links below.

== Economy ==
Solihull is regarded as having one of the strongest subregional economies in the West Midlands, with a significantly higher nominal GVA per capita and Silhillians enjoying considerably higher disposable income rates than both regional and UK averages.

Analysis also shows Solihull as having the lowest (and fastest falling) claimant count for Jobseeker's Allowance in the region.

This is a chart of trend of regional gross value added of Solihull at current basic prices published (pp. 240–253) by Office for National Statistics with figures in millions of British Pounds Sterling.

Year	Regional Gross Value Added^{4}	Agriculture^{1}	Industry^{2}	Services^{3}
1995	1,929	12	496	1,421
2000	2,959	8	870	2,082
2003	4,023	8	1,121	2,893

^1 includes hunting and forestry

^2 includes energy and construction

^3 includes financial intermediation services indirectly measured

^4 Components may not sum to totals due to rounding

== Settlements in Solihull ==
Localities in the borough include:

- Balsall, Balsall Common, Barston, Bentley Heath, Berkswell, Bickenhill, Blossomfield
- Castle Bromwich, Catherine-de-Barnes, Chadwick End, Chelmsley Wood, Cheswick Green, Coleshill Heath, Copt Heath
- Dickens Heath, Dorridge
- Elmdon, Elmdon Heath
- Fordbridge
- Hampton in Arden, Hockley Heath
- Kingshurst, Knowle
- Lyndon
- Marston Green, Meriden, Monkspath Street
- Olton
- Packwood
- Sharmans Cross, Shirley, Silhill, Smith's Wood, Solihull
- Temple Balsall, Tidbury Green
- Whitlock's End

== Notable people ==
- Dorian Yates - IFBB Pro Bodybuilder and six-time Mr Olympia winner (1992-1997) born in Solihull
- Michael Buerk – BBC news presenter and journalist born and educated in Solihull
- Jasper Carrott – Born and lived in the Solihull Area
- Lucy Davis - Daughter of Jasper Carrott. Born and raised in Solihull
- Richard Hammond – Top Gear presenter and radio presenter was born in Solihull.
- Martin Johnson – Rugby World Cup- winning England team captain and later their manager was born in Solihull.
- John Wyndham – Science fiction author (The Day of the Triffids) was born in Dorridge in the Solihull area.

There is a longer list in the article for Solihull town.

== Freedom of the Borough ==
The following people and military units have received the Freedom of the Borough of Solihull.

=== Individuals ===
- Lance corporal Matthew Croucher: 16 December 2008.
