= Hampton in Arden =

Village in Solihull, England

Coordinates: 52.43110°N 1.69992°W

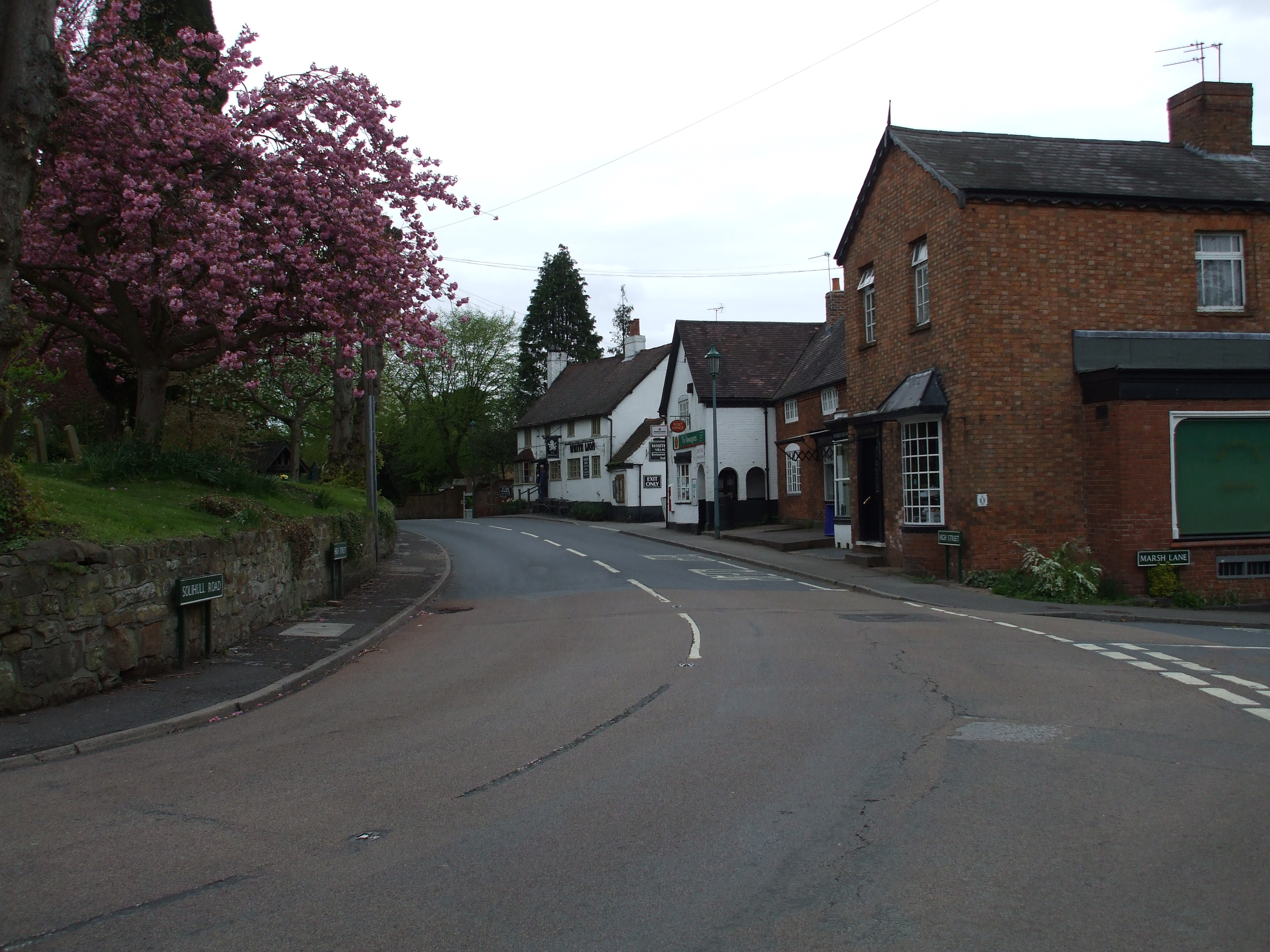
- Hampton in Arden, High Street

- Location within the West Midlands
- Population: 1,834 (2011 Census)
- OS grid reference: SP205815
- Civil parish: Hampton in Arden
- Metropolitan borough: Solihull
- Metropolitan county: West Midlands
- Region: West Midlands
- Country: England
- Sovereign state: United Kingdom
- Post town: SOLIHULL
- Postcode district: B92
- Police: West Midlands
- Fire: West Midlands
- Ambulance: West Midlands
- UK Parliament: Meriden and Solihull East
- Website: Welcome to the website for Hampton in Arden

Hampton in Arden is a village and civil parish located in the Forest of Arden in the Metropolitan Borough of Solihull, in the West Midlands of England. Hampton in Arden was part of Warwickshire until the 1974 boundary changes. It lies within the Meriden Gap which is an area of countryside between Solihull and Coventry.

In 1968 the central part of the village was designated a Conservation Area, which is an "area of special architectural or historic interest, the character or appearance of which it is desirable to preserve or enhance". Its population in the 2001 census was 1,787, increasing to 1,834 at the 2011 Census.

== History ==
Hampton is mentioned in Domesday Book (1086), when it was held by Geoffrey de Wirce. "In Coleshill Hundred Hantone. 10 hides. Land for 22 ploughs. In lordship 2; 2 male and 2 female slaves. 50 villagers with a priest and 16 smallholders have 13 ploughs. A mill at 40d; meadow, 10 acres; woodland 3 leagues long and 3 wide. The value was and is 100s." All of Geffrey's lands were held freely by Leofwin. Geffrey's wife was called Aelfeva and her English name suggests that Geffrey may have acquired his Warwickshire lands through her, by inheritance rather than by confiscation; she may have been Leofwin's heiress. A priest was recorded, implying that a church existed.

Of the name, Hantone, Dugdale states that the name was occasioned from the situation, "hean" in the Saxon signifying high though by contraction written "han" and through corrupt pronunciation "ham".

Dugdale could find no mention of Geffrey having any children and concluded that he must have died without issue, his lands reverted to the Crown and by a grant of Henry I all his lands were passed to Nigel de Albani. Nigel had a son, Roger, surnamed Mowbray, from whom, from the middle of the 12th century the de Ardernes, became the Lords of the Manor. Afterwards it passed by marriage to the de Montford family of Coleshill and then subsequently reverted to the Crown. It was granted to Robert Dudley, Earl of Leicester, by Queen Elizabeth I in 1570 but reverted to the Crown after his death. In 1625, it was assigned to Queen Henrietta Maria, wife of King Charles I. In the early 19th century it was sold to Isaac William Lillingston who later sold the Manor of Hampton to Sir Robert Peel (former Prime Minister and founder of the modern police force). On Sir Robert's death in 1850, the manor was inherited by his son, Frederick, who did much to 'modernise' Hampton, demolishing many half-timbered and thatched cottages. He employed the architect W E Nesfield to build new dwellings, shops and lodges.

== Notable landmarks ==
=== The parish church of St. Mary and St. Bartholomew ===
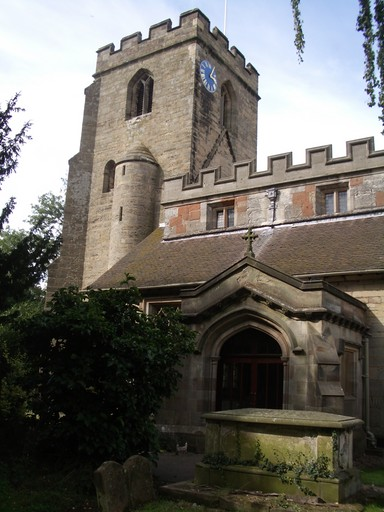
St. Mary and St. Bartholomew

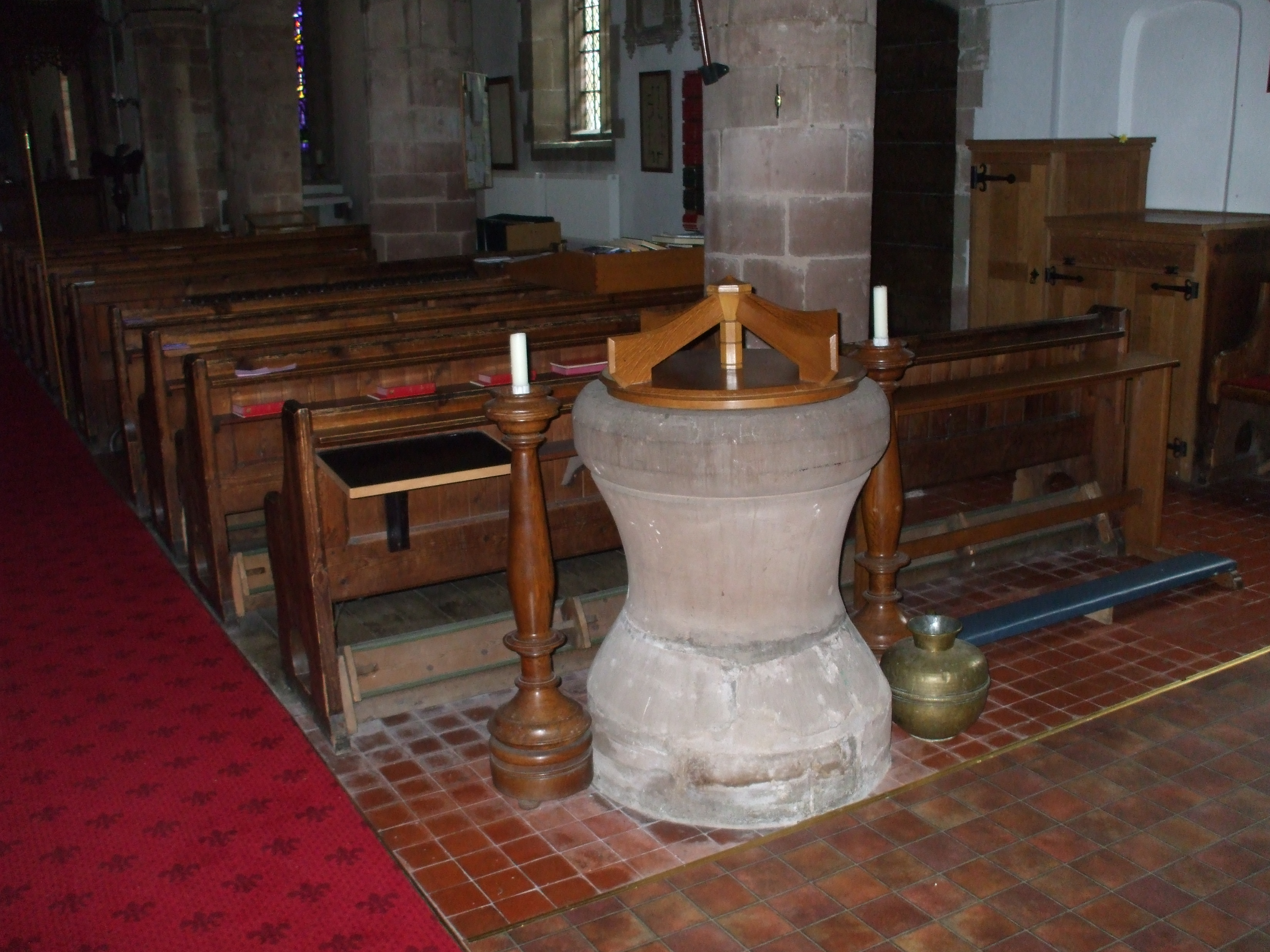
The Font

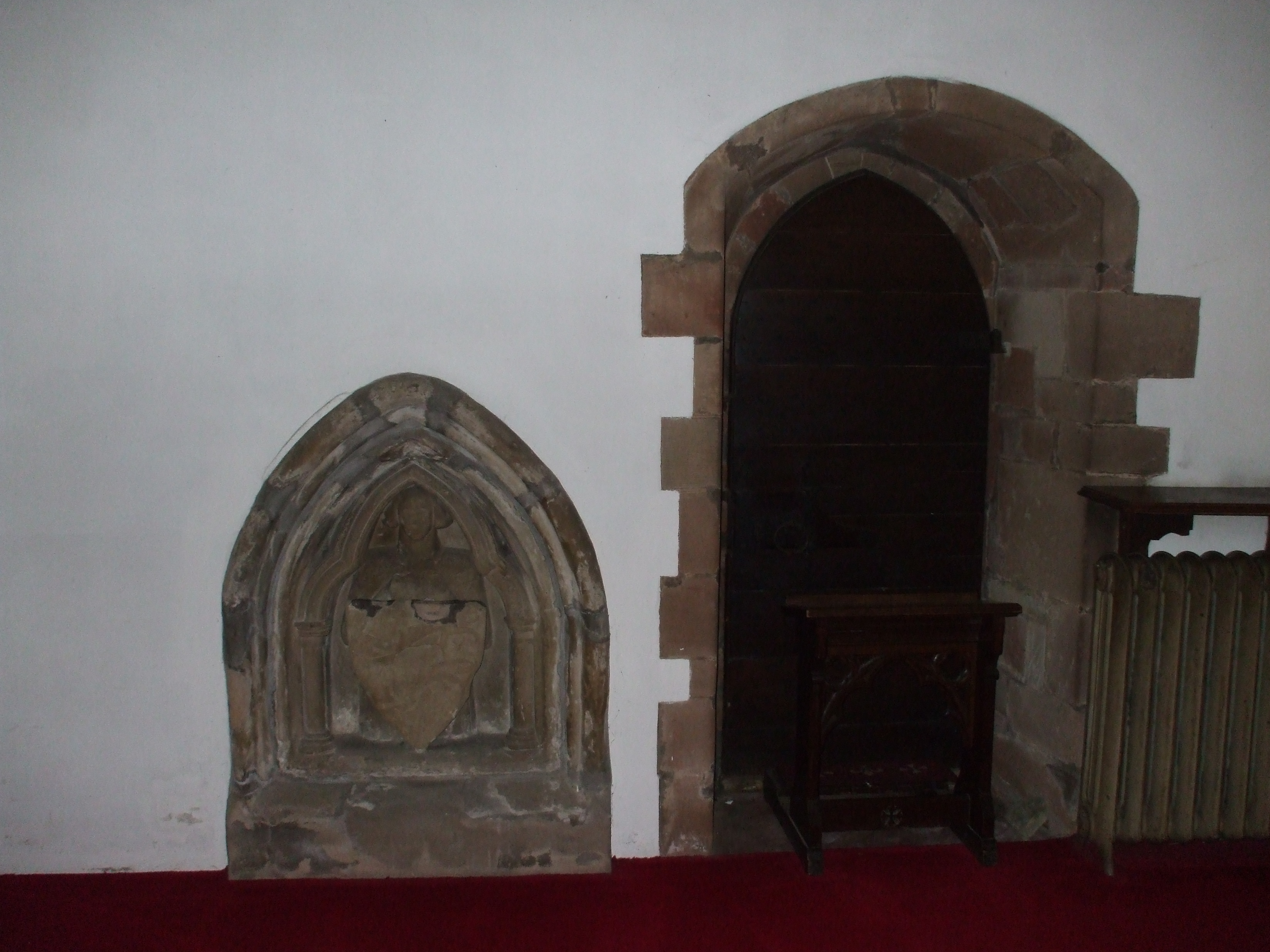
Heart Shrine and Priests door

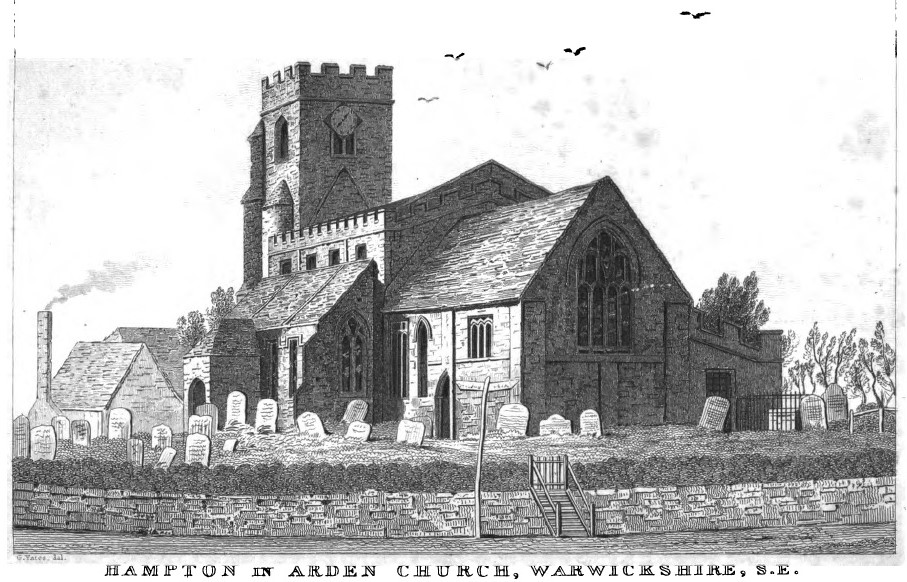
Hampton in Arden Church, Warwickshire, S.E. (p.200, March 1824)

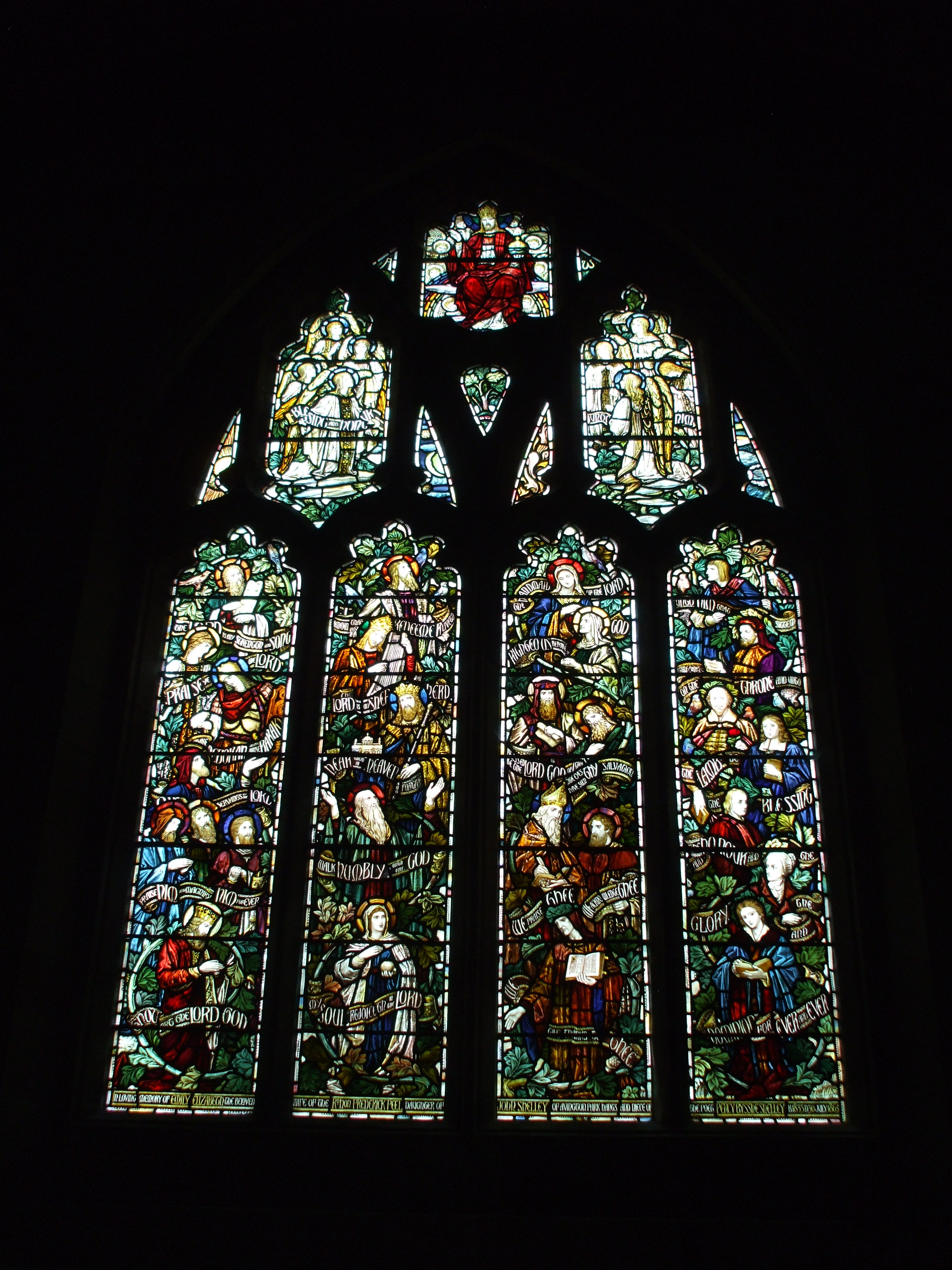
The East Window

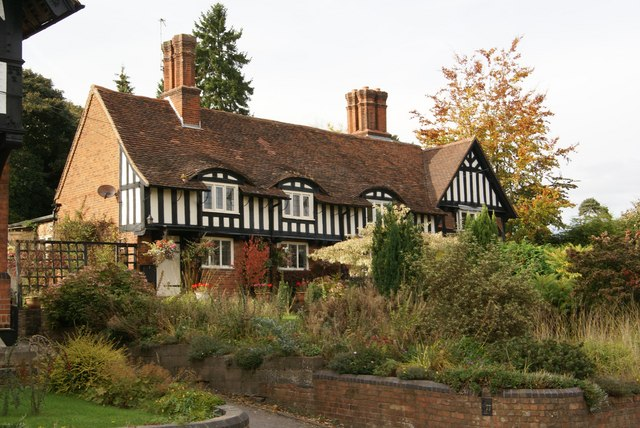
Estate Cottages

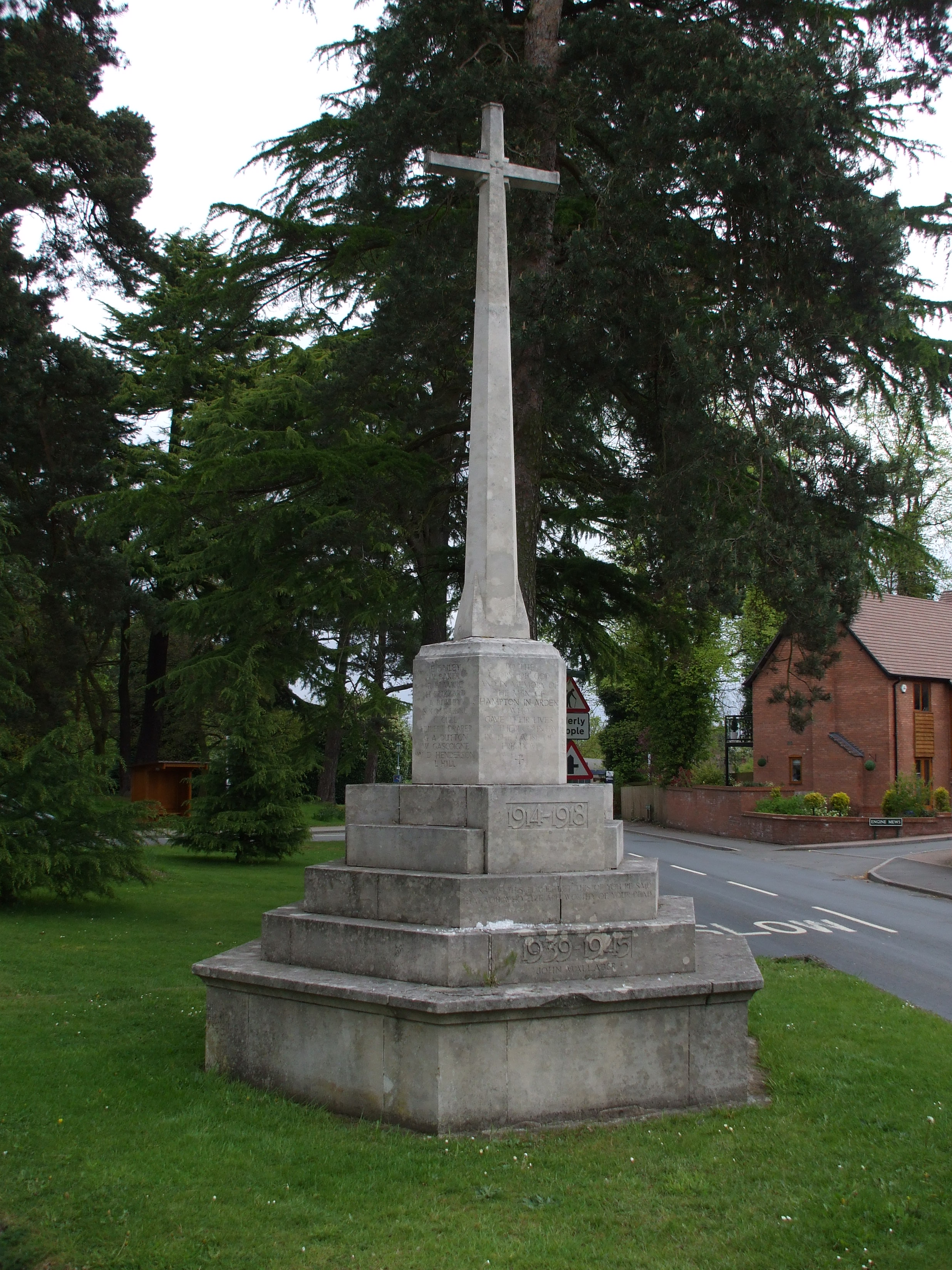
War Memorial

The parish church of St. Mary and St. Bartholomew has a chancel, nave with narrow aisles, west tower, south porch, and north vestry. The chancel is of about mid 12th-century date. It is comparatively long and narrow for the period, in a church of this size, and it has an unusual north doorway near the west end; it is possible that it represented the complete church, at least for a short time. The nave, if not coeval, was built soon afterwards and had a late-12th-century south aisle, of which the arcade remains. Possibly the nave was of the same width as the chancel, but was widened to the north about 5 ft (1.5 m). about the middle of the 13th century and a narrow north aisle and arcade added. The chancel arch was widened at the same time to the utmost limits permitted by the width of the chancel. For some reason, probably weakness, the north aisle was rebuilt late in the 14th century on the old foundations of the narrow aisle. This was followed by a similar rebuilding of the south aisle early in the 15th century, again without widening it. About the same time the west tower was begun, but carried up only a short way, the completion being delayed until late in the century. The last medieval alteration was the building of the clerestory in the 16th century in place of the old steeply pitched roof indicated by the lines on the tower. The tower bore a tall spire "till by the extraordinary violence of lightning and thunder happening on St.Andrew's Day, in the night, in the year 1643, it was cloven, and fell to the ground: at which time the whole fabrick, with the tower, were torn in divers places." The south porch and north vestry are modern, and various repairs and restorations have been executed to other parts. The chancel was rebuilt in 1879 with the old material overseen by the architect W. E. Nesfield. All the roofs are modern. The church bells and most of their fittings were transplanted here from Manchester in 1976, where they had previously hung in the church of St John in Miles Platting, then being demolished due to subsidence.

=== Other ===
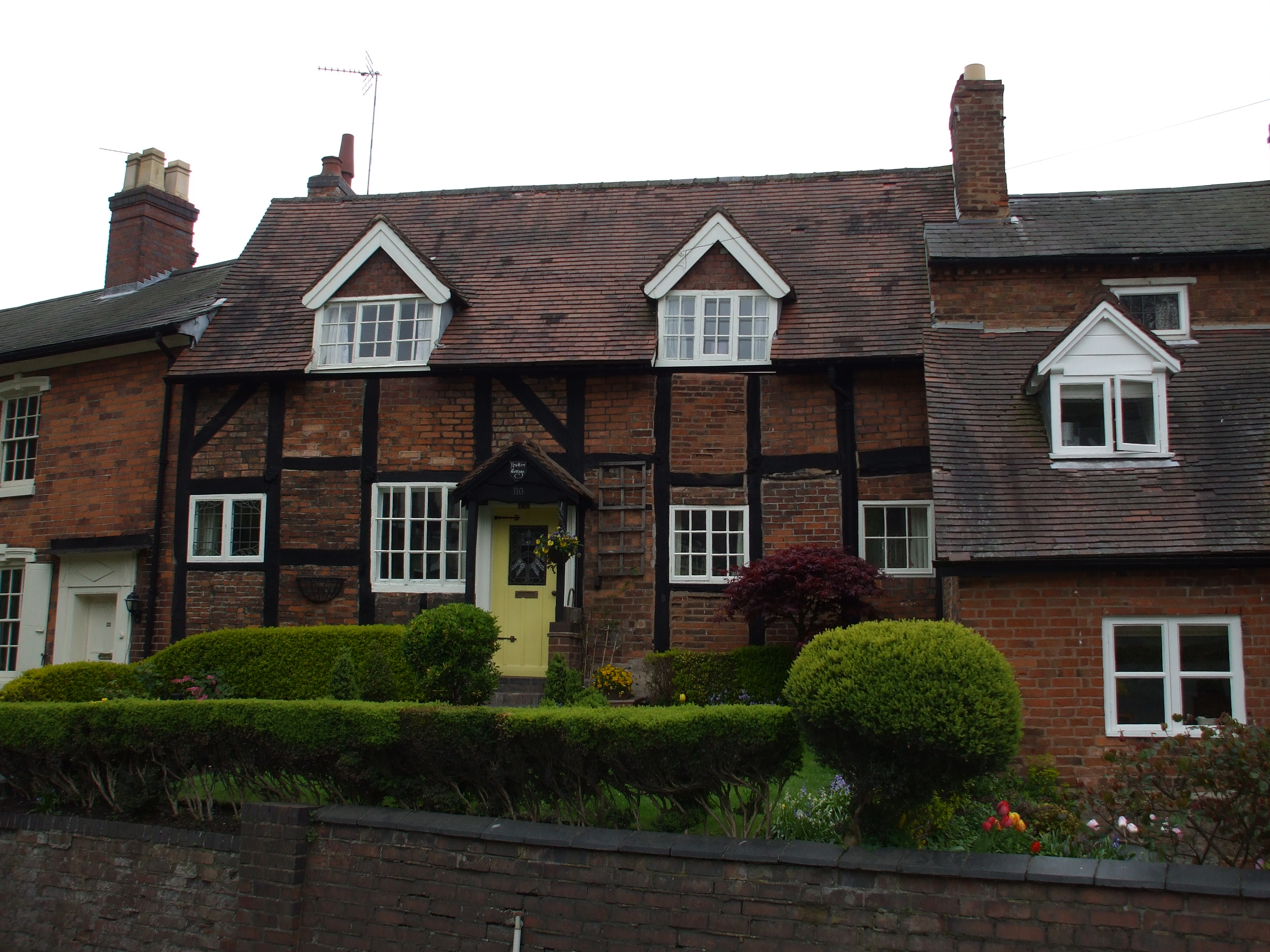
Yew Tree Cottage

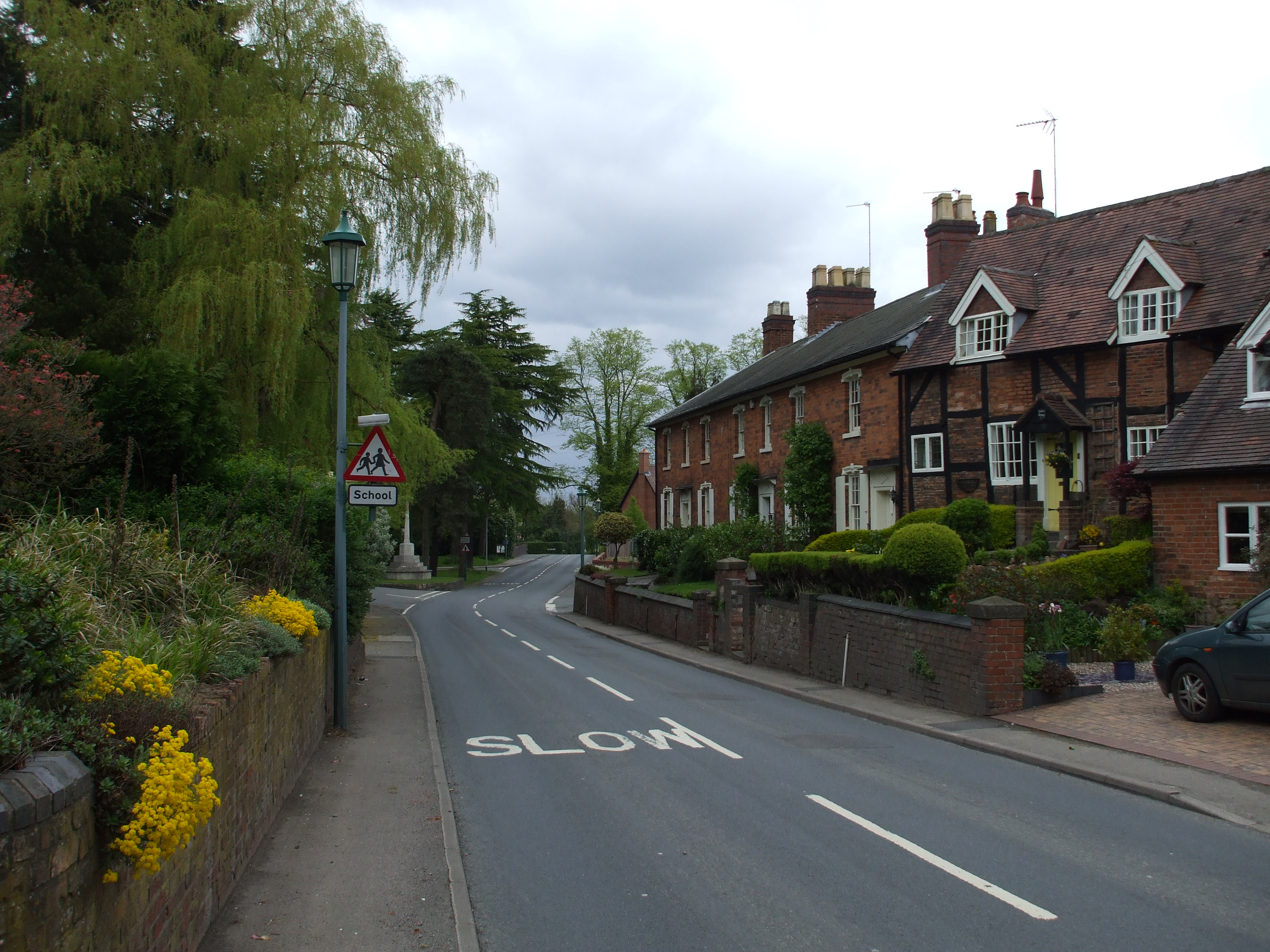
Cottages on the High Street

There are some well preserved 17th century and timber-framed houses, some of which are listed. Outside the village, to the south-east, is the 15th-century packhorse bridge over the River Blythe and on the former route to Kenilworth. Only 5 ft (1.5 m). wide between the low parapets, consisting of five bays with ancient stone piers having pointed cut-water faces on the west side against the flow of the stream—and square projections on the east. The three northern arches are segmental-pointed, the southern two have been rebuilt with brick arches. East of the bridge is a ford.

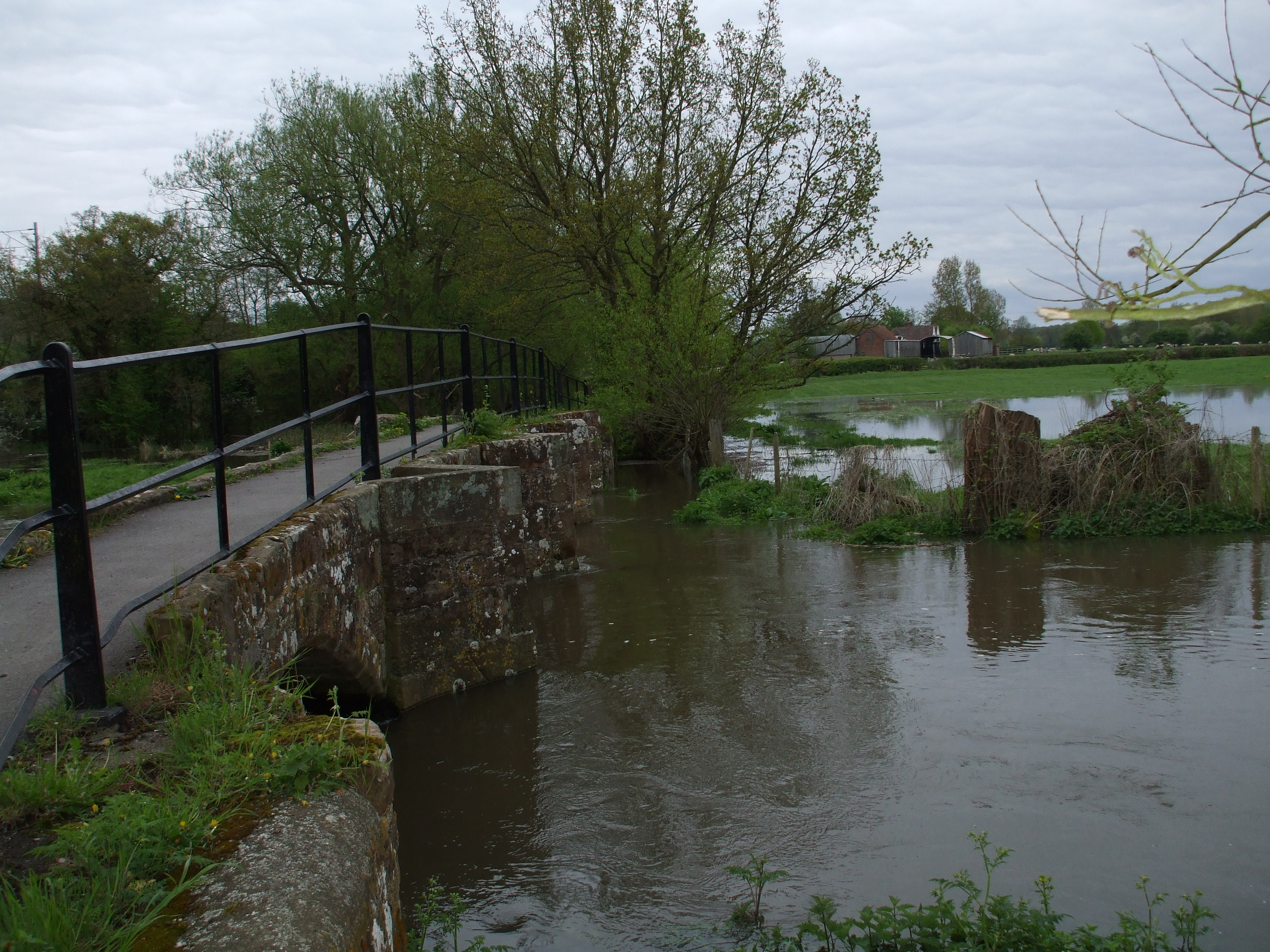
15th-century Packhorse Bridge

The war memorial lists the names of 23 men of the parish who were killed in World War I and one in World War II. It is dedicated; To the Glory of God and in Memory of the men of Hampton in Arden who gave their lives for their country in the cause of freedom 1914–1918 and below Sons of this place let this of you be said that you who live are worthy of your dead 1939–1945 ( there are 24 names from WW1 and 1 from WW2, one must have been added recently) .

== Governance ==
Hampton in Arden is part of the Meriden & Arden ward of Solihull Metropolitan Borough Council, and is represented by Councillors David Hoey (Reform UK), Jane Lamden and Catherine Price (both Conservative Party). Nationally, it is part of the constituency of Meriden, whose Member of Parliament is a Conservative, Saqib Bhatti. Prior to Brexit in 2020, it was included in the West Midlands electoral region of the European Parliament.

== Transport links ==
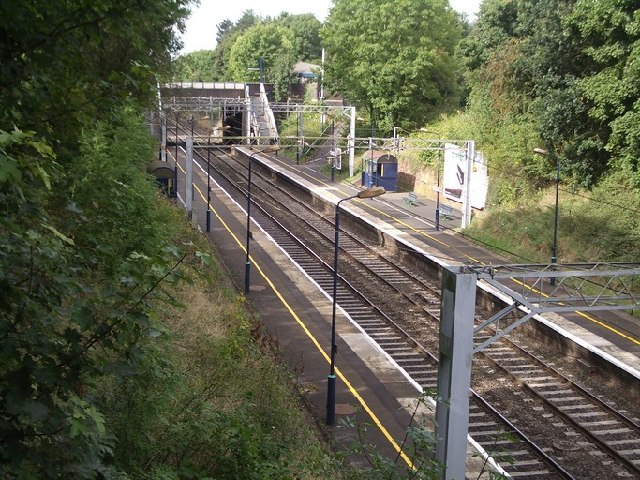
Hampton-in-Arden railway station

The M42 motorway, Birmingham Airport and the National Exhibition Centre (NEC) are nearby.

Hampton was at the southern end of the Birmingham and Derby Junction Railway, later part of the Midland Railway. Opened as a double-track main line on 12 August 1839, the section from Whitacre to Hampton, known as the Stonebridge Railway, was downgraded to a branch line in 1842 after the opening of the line from Whitacre into Birmingham; it was singled in 1843 and lost its final passenger service in 1917 as a wartime economy measure. After lingering on as a goods line, it was closed entirely in 1935 following a bridge failure at Packwood. The line had originally enabled passengers from the Derby, Tamworth, Kingsbury, Whitacre, Shustoke and Coleshill areas to make connections at Hampton for other parts of the country, because at one time the Midland Railway and the London & North Western Railway (LNWR) had stations side by side at Hampton, at the point where the two lines met (called Derby Junction). The Midland station building can still be seen, but the LNWR station disappeared long ago, being replaced by the present Hampton-in-Arden railway station some 500m nearer London in 1884. The track bed of the old Midland route remains and a footpath for hikers and railway buffs runs alongside the site of the original track. Hampton is now served by hourly bus services 82 and 89 between Solihull and Coventry operated by Stagecoach in Warwickshire Although through fares are currently unavailable, most buses on service 82 continue from Solihull to Stratford upon Avon as service X20. The railway provides a link between Birmingham and Coventry approximately every 30 minutes Monday to Saturday.The village is namechecked in the Crokodile Tears song Trains.

== Sports and leisure ==
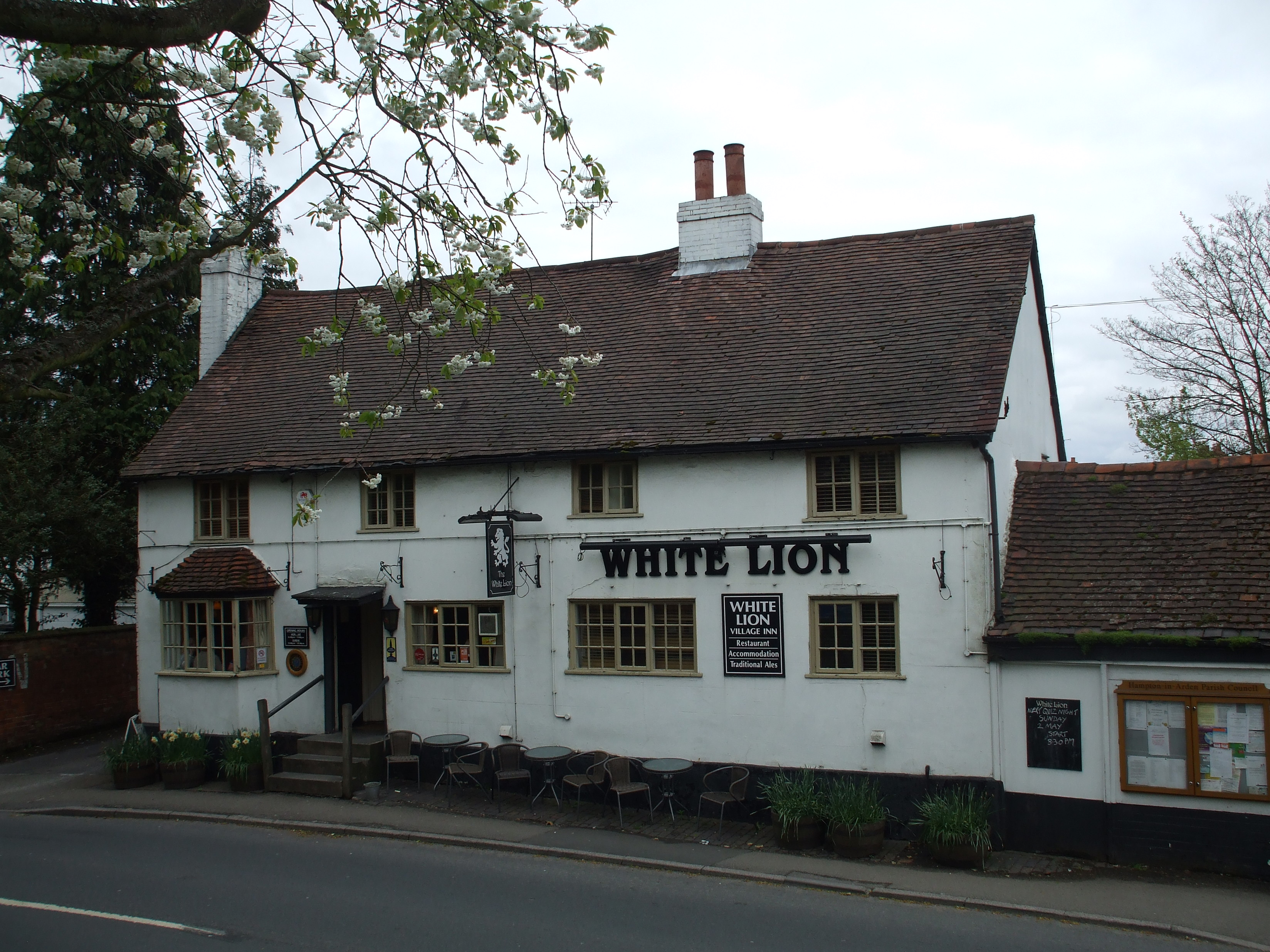
The White Lion Public House

The village has one pub, the 17th-century The White Lion public house north-east of the church on the High Street, which is plastered externally, but old beams are exposed inside. There is also one restaurant, the Soho Tavern, within an 18th-century Georgian building on Marsh Lane, with panel front door centred, topped with rectangular windows (in door or as a transom) and capped with an elaborate entablature supported by decorative pilasters. It began life as a private house but was later bought by the local George Fentham charity as a place of recreation for men. In 1913 a hall was built adjoining the house and the whole complex was used as a VAD Hospital during the First World War. After the war the hall became the equivalent of a village hall and the house reverted to being a working men's club. In the late 1980s the club was used less and less and an alternative use had to be found. In 1997 it was converted into the Beeches Bar & Grill which closed in 2022 and turned into Soho Tavern in 2023
