= Balsall Common =

Coordinates: 52.39144°N 1.65169°W

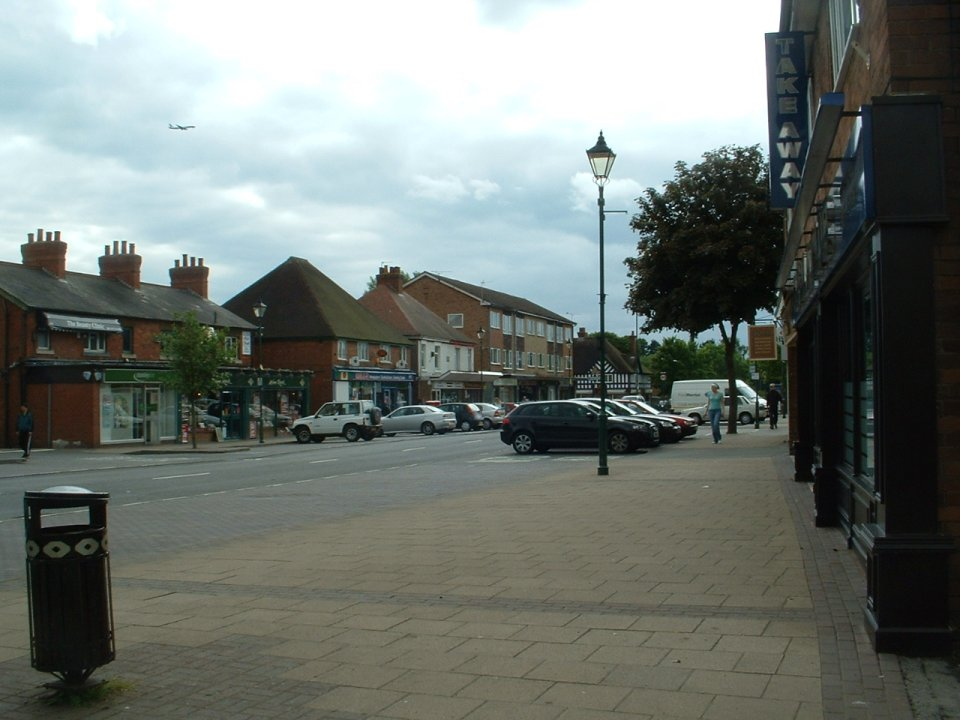
- Station Road, the main shopping street

- Location within the West Midlands
- Population: 7,458 (2021)
- OS grid reference: SP238771
- Civil parish: Balsall, Berkswell
- Metropolitan borough: Solihull
- Metropolitan county: West Midlands
- Region: West Midlands
- Country: England
- Sovereign state: United Kingdom
- Post town: COVENTRY
- Postcode district: CV7
- Police: West Midlands
- Fire: West Midlands
- Ambulance: West Midlands

Balsall Common is a large village in the Metropolitan Borough of Solihull, West Midlands, England. It is situated 5 miles (8 km) northwest of Kenilworth, 7 miles (11 km) west of central Coventry (but only three miles (4.5 km) from the westernmost edge of the city), 7.5 miles (12.1 km) east of Solihull and 14 miles (23 km) to the southeast of Birmingham.

The village was previously part of Warwickshire. The name "Balsall" comes from the Anglo Saxon word "Baelle" meaning corner (or angle) of land, and "Heale" meaning a sheltered place.

In October 2025, Solihull Metropolitan Borough Council officially reclassified Balsall Common from a village to a town within its revised Solihull Settlement Hierarchy. Approved on 23 October 2025 in response to updates to the National Planning Policy Framework, the designation applies strictly for local planning purposes—enabling the council to apply Green Belt and "grey belt" protections against urban sprawl and coalescence that are legally reserved for towns rather than villages. The change does not alter the settlement's civic governance, postal addresses, or everyday identity as a village.

== Overview ==
The village is split between the civil parishes of Berkswell (to the east) and Balsall, which also includes Balsall Street, Temple Balsall, and Fen End, and had a population of 7,458 according to the 2021 census. It also lies on the Heart of England Way.

The village is of recent origin; most of the houses and shops were built in the 20th century. Previously, the village consisted of a couple of hamlets of about six to twelve houses each and a few scattered cottages. In the 1930s, there began the development which linked these isolated buildings, but it was not until after World War II that the village began to grow.

With its proximity to the village of Meriden 4 miles (6.4 km) away, which until recently was long-believed to be the geographic centre of England, Balsall Common is perceived to be one of the furthest places from the UK coastline. In fact, Coton-in-the-Elms in south Derbyshire holds this designation, situated 23.5 miles (37.8 km) to the north. Nevertheless, Balsall Common's secondary school is named the Heart of England School. The local primary school is Balsall Common Primary School.

It is served by Berkswell railway station (actually in Balsall Common: the station was formerly called Berkswell & Balsall Common) on the Coventry-Birmingham line, and by buses to Solihull (services 87 & 188).

The High Speed 2 railway line is currently under construction on the edge of the village, and will include the 425-metre-long (1,394 ft) Balsall Common Viaduct. Other nearby towns and villages include Knowle, Kenilworth, Warwick, Hampton in Arden, Berkswell, Barston, Honiley and Hatton. Its districts include Needler's End, Yew Tree, Catchems Corner, Balsall Street and Hallmeadow (developed in the 1990s).
