= Robert Mutchell =

English footballer

Personal information
- Full name: Robert David Mutchell
- Date of birth: 3 January 1974 (age 52)
- Place of birth: Solihull, England
- Height: 5 ft 8 in (1.73 m)
- Position: Defender

Senior career*
Years	Team	Apps	(Gls)
1992–1993	Oxford United	0	(0)
1993–1995	Barnet	55	(0)
1996–1997	Stevenage Borough	105	(7)
1997–1999	Kettering Town	60	(4)
1999–2003	Tamworth	190	(12)
- * Club domestic league appearances and goals

Robert David Mutchell (born 3 January 1974 in Solihull, England) is an English former footballer.
