= 2024 West Midlands mayoral election =

Election in the West Midlands

- 2 May 2024
- Turnout: 29.8% ▼1.4%
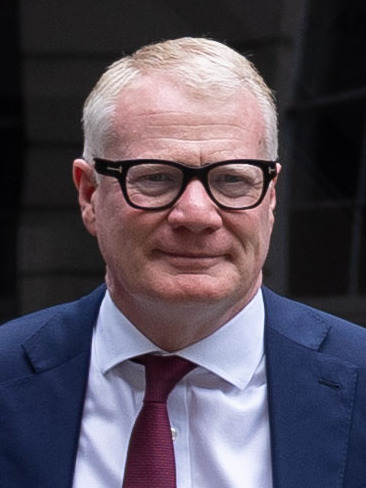

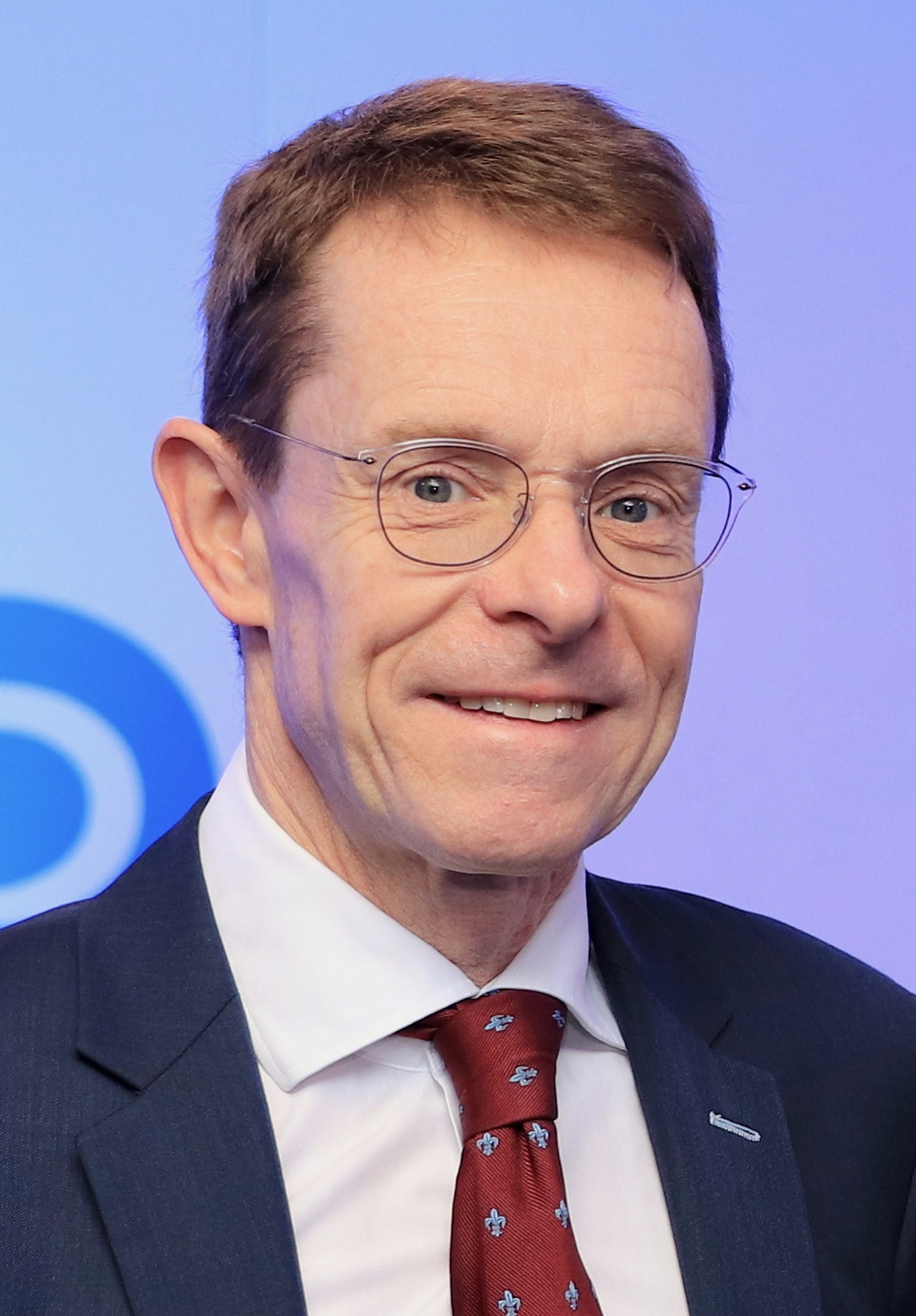

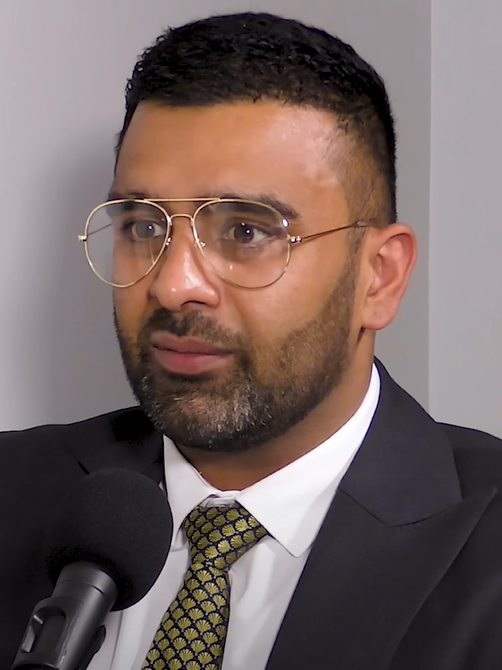
Candidate	Richard Parker	Andy Street	Akhmed Yakoob
Party	Labour Co-op	Conservative	Independent
Popular vote	225,590	224,082	69,621
Percentage	37.8%	37.5%	11.7%
Swing (Note: Calculated from the first round of the 2021 election)	▼1.9 pp	▼11.2 pp	New
Candidate	Elaine Williams	Siobhan Harper-Nunes	Sunny Virk
Party	Reform	Green	Liberal Democrats
Popular vote	34,471	31,036	12,176
Percentage	5.8%	5.2%	2.0%
Swing	▲3.6 pp	▼0.6 pp	▼1.6 pp
- Election result by council areas
Mayor before election
Andy Street
Conservative
Elected Mayor
Richard Parker
Labour Co-op

The 2024 West Midlands mayoral election was held on 2 May 2024 to elect the mayor of the West Midlands. The election took place on the same day as other local elections across England and Wales. Richard Parker of the Labour Party won the election, narrowly defeating incumbent Conservative mayor Andy Street, who was running for a third term.

== Background ==
The West Midlands is the second most populous city-region of the United Kingdom, after Greater London. The position of Mayor of the West Midlands was created in 2017 following a devolution agreement between the UK government and the West Midlands Combined Authority (WMCA). The Cities and Local Government Devolution Act 2016 required a directly elected "metro mayor" for combined authorities to receive additional powers from central government. Under the terms of the devolution deal, the first mayoral term was set to last until 2020, followed by elections every four years. In the inaugural election in 2017, the Conservative candidate Andy Street defeated Labour's Siôn Simon in the final round with 50.4% of the vote. Street was subsequently elected to a second term in 2021 (the election having been delayed a year in the COVID-19 pandemic), defeating Labour candidate Liam Byrne in the final round with 54.0% of the vote.

== Electoral system ==
This election was the first to use first past the post to elect the mayor as a result of the changes made by the Elections Act 2022, with previous elections in 2017 and 2021 using the supplementary vote system.

All registered electors living in the metropolitan boroughs of Birmingham, Coventry, Dudley, Sandwell, Solihull, Walsall, and Wolverhampton aged 18 or over were entitled to vote.

== Candidates ==
=== Conservative Party ===
Andy Street, the incumbent mayor and former managing director of John Lewis & Partners.

=== Labour Party ===
The incumbent West Midlands Police and Crime Commissioner, Simon Foster, initially sought selection before dropping out after receiving only three nominations from local Constituency Labour Parties, while the former accountant Richard Parker received seventeen and the councillor and victims' commissioner Nicky Brennan received eight. Parker went on to be selected on 14 April 2023 following a ballot of Labour members in the region.

Parker worked at PwC from 1989 to 2015, leading on housing and communities and managing the company's relationship with the Labour shadow cabinet from 2010 to 2015. After leaving PwC he started a business "working with SMEs and social enterprises on green investment, housing initiatives and the Birmingham Commonwealth Games". He said that if elected mayor, he would take public control of the bus network, only give combined authority contracts that pay their staff well, and move the net zero deadline from 2041 to 2035. He had been endorsed by most Labour MPs and senior Labour councillors in the region.

=== Green Party ===
The Green Party of England and Wales candidate in the election was Siobhan Harper-Nunes. A local businesswoman, Harper-Nunes previously stood as a Green candidate in the 2022 Birmingham Erdington by-election.

=== Liberal Democrats ===
The Liberal Democrats chose barrister and mediator Sunny Virk as their candidate. Virk stood in the 2023 Tamworth by-election. If elected, he promised to focus on the transport network and attracting investment to the region.

=== Reform UK ===
Reform UK announced Elaine Williams, a solicitor as their candidate in March 2024.

=== Independent ===
Akhmed Yakoob, a criminal defence lawyer, stood as an independent. He was endorsed by George Galloway. The majority of his campaigning occurred on social media, in particular TikTok. His campaign focused on the Gaza war and various local issues.

== Campaign ==
Prior to the election, the Labour-run Birmingham City Council, the local council for the most populous metropolitan borough within West Midlands, declared bankruptcy. The situation was criticised during the campaign by the incumbent mayor, Conservative Andy Street, who said that the Council had "let down" citizens and services. However, he also distanced himself from the incumbent Conservative government led by Prime Minister Rishi Sunak, urging voters to "focus on him and his record, not the performance of the Conservative party nationally". Street also highlighted his record in office, saying that "an extra £10 billion pounds has come to the area as a result of the mayoral system" and that his mayoralty had "delivered 16,000 more houses a year, 33% of them affordable", which according to him was "one of the best records of any region".

Amongst his other policies, Street pledged to treble the amount of social housing within the West Midlands to 1,700 new social homes per year, using powers newly devolved to the combined authority in 2023, with the city region receiving a single affordable housing settlement from central government after 2026. Disappointed with the central government decision to cancel the northern leg of the high-speed rail project HS2 from Birmingham to Manchester, Street outlined plans with the Mayor of Greater Manchester Andy Burnham to revive the high-speed rail project with private investment.

The Labour candidate for Mayor, Richard Parker, pledged to "create 150,000 new jobs for the region" by focusing on raising the skill level of the workforce in the region with the mayor's adult skills budget and by creating a taskforce to help support businesses in the region to stay and grow. He has also pledged to bring the region's bus services into public ownership. Parker also said that he doesn't believe people will blame Labour for the Birmingham's Labour-led city council declaring bankruptcy, instead commenting that "the Conservatives have cut £1 billion from the council's budget during the past decade" which has been "incredibly damaging" to the "poorest communities at a time when they've been suffering most" according to him. Parker has in his campaign also pledged to "offer real help with the cost of living crisis" and deliver more affordable and reliable public transport for the region.

Both Street and Parker, alongside the Liberal Democrat candidate Sunny Virk, backed the proposed light rail system in Coventry, with Street saying that he has "ring-fenced £72m in government money" for the system. Parker has promised that if elected he would "revisit the scheme to make sure money was available more quickly". The Green candidate, Siobhan Harper-Nunes also backed the system, but criticised central government for "refusing to fund VLR in full". In contrast to the others, Elaine Williams of Reform UK, branded the proposals "a vanity project" and said that "Coventry could and should spend a fraction of this amount on increasing the number of buses, security on its buses, remove restrictions and welcome cars back into its city centre".

The role of the Police and Crime Commissioner for the region was set to be abolished and its functions transferred to the Mayor in time for the next mayoral term following the election, however the incumbent Labour PCC Simon Foster took legal action against the process and the High Court ruled in his favour, preventing the scheduled merger of the roles prior to the election. The roles in question are already merged in London, Manchester and West Yorkshire, with the Mayor of South Yorkshire scheduled to have the PCC powers merged into the offices functions coinciding with the election. Street continued to support the merger of the functions to the mayoral powers, saying that the success of the model was "already evident" in the aforementioned city regions. Street had previously accused his Labour opponent of "refusing to come clean on his views on the future of policing and crime" in the region and had said that "it was surprising the candidate did not appear to have a view on the future of policing governance in the region", after Parker had said that "he did not wish to comment yet" on the proposal prior to the completion of the consultation process on the issue by the government.

A Labour canvasser was the victim of a deepfake that falsely portrayed her as a racist. The video was shared by independent candidate Akhmed Yakoob. The canvasser sued Yakoob and received damages for defamation and breach of data protection rights. It was believed to be the first legal settlement in the UK concerning a political deepfake.

== Results ==
The Labour candidate, Richard Parker, narrowly won the election by 1,508 votes, defeating the incumbent Conservative mayor, Andy Street, by just 0.3 percentage points.

2024 West Midlands mayoral election
Party	Candidate	Votes	%	±%
Labour Co-op	Richard Parker	225,590	37.8	▼1.8
Conservative	Andy Street	224,082	37.5	▼11.2
Independent	Akhmed Yakoob	69,621	11.7	N/A
Reform	Elaine Williams	34,471	5.8	▲3.6
Green	Siobhan Harper-Nunes	31,036	5.2	▼0.6
Liberal Democrats	Sunny Virk	12,176	2.0	▼1.6
Majority		1,508	0.3	N/A
Rejected ballots		4,757		
Turnout		601,828	29.8	▼1.4
Registered electors		2,018,546		
Labour Co-op gain from Conservative		Swing	▲4.7	

=== Results by borough ===
==== Birmingham ====
2024 West Midlands mayoral election in Birmingham
Party	Candidate	Votes	%
Labour Co-op	Richard Parker	80,251	37.3
Conservative	Andy Street	66,296	30.8
Independent	Akhmed Yakoob	42,923	19.9
Green	Siobhan Harper-Nunes	12,879	6.0
Reform	Elaine Williams	9,086	4.2
Liberal Democrats	Sunny Virk	3,722	1.7
Turnout		215,157	28.3
Rejected ballots		1,338	0.6
Registered electors		760,404	

==== Coventry ====
2024 West Midlands mayoral election in Coventry
Party	Candidate	Votes	%
Labour Co-op	Richard Parker	32,704	46.4
Conservative	Andy Street	23,237	32.9
Green	Siobhan Harper-Nunes	4,292	6.1
Reform	Elaine Williams	3,943	5.6
Independent	Akhmed Yakoob	3,639	5.2
Liberal Democrats	Sunny Virk	2,711	3.8
Turnout		70,526	29.2
Rejected ballots		684	1.0
Registered electors		241,267	

==== Dudley ====
2024 West Midlands mayoral election in Dudley
Party	Candidate	Votes	%
Conservative	Andy Street	37,345	49.4
Labour Co-op	Richard Parker	24,807	32.8
Reform	Elaine Williams	5,431	7.2
Independent	Akhmed Yakoob	3,874	5.1
Green	Siobhan Harper-Nunes	2,913	3.9
Liberal Democrats	Sunny Virk	1,163	1.5
Turnout		75,533	32.2
Rejected ballots		581	0.8
Registered electors		234,612	

==== Sandwell ====
2024 West Midlands mayoral election in Sandwell
Party	Candidate	Votes	%
Labour Co-op	Richard Parker	31,561	48.2
Conservative	Andy Street	18,598	28.4
Independent	Akhmed Yakoob	7,026	10.7
Reform	Elaine Williams	4,347	6.6
Green	Siobhan Harper-Nunes	2,722	4.2
Liberal Democrats	Sunny Virk	1,201	1.8
Turnout		65,455	28.1
Rejected ballots		873	1.3
Registered electors		232,636	

==== Solihull ====
2024 West Midlands mayoral election in Solihull
Party	Candidate	Votes	%
Conservative	Andy Street	35,289	62.5
Labour Co-op	Richard Parker	11,728	20.8
Green	Siobhan Harper-Nunes	3,582	6.3
Reform	Elaine Williams	2,887	5.1
Liberal Democrats	Sunny Virk	1,546	2.7
Independent	Akhmed Yakoob	1,454	2.6
Turnout		56,486	34.8
Rejected ballots		319	0.6
Registered electors		162,529	

==== Walsall ====
2024 West Midlands mayoral election in Walsall
Party	Candidate	Votes	%
Conservative	Andy Street	24,735	41.6
Labour Co-op	Richard Parker	18,097	30.4
Independent	Akhmed Yakoob	8,451	14.2
Reform	Elaine Williams	5,247	8.8
Green	Siobhan Harper-Nunes	2,127	3.6
Liberal Democrats	Sunny Virk	847	1.4
Turnout		59,504	29.8
Rejected ballots		468	0.8
Registered electors		199,862	

==== Wolverhampton ====
2024 West Midlands mayoral election in Wolverhampton
Party	Candidate	Votes	%
Labour Co-op	Richard Parker	26,442	48.7
Conservative	Andy Street	18,582	34.2
Reform	Elaine Williams	3,530	6.5
Green	Siobhan Harper-Nunes	2,521	4.6
Independent	Akhmed Yakoob	2,254	4.1
Liberal Democrats	Sunny Virk	986	1.8
Turnout		54,315	29.0
Rejected ballots		494	0.9
Registered electors		187,236	

== Opinion polling ==
Dates conducted	Pollster	Client	Sample size	Street	Parker	Harper-Nunes	Virk	Williams	Yakoob	Others	Lead
Dates conducted	Pollster	Client	Sample size	Con	Lab	Green	Lib Dems	Reform	Ind	Others	Lead
2 May 2024	Election result		–	37.5%	37.8%	5.2%	2%	5.8%	11.7%	–	0.3
12–29 Apr 2024	YouGov	N/A	1,495	41%	39%	6%	2%	9%	3%	–	2
22–24 Apr 2024	Redfield & Wilton	N/A	1,000	37%	43%	5%	8%	4%	–	3%	6
19–24 Apr 2024	More in Common	N/A	1,541	41%	39%	8%	1%	8%	3%	–	2
11–17 Apr 2024	Savanta	The News Agents	1,018	38%	41%	5%	5%	6%	5%	–	3
10–14 Apr 2024	Redfield & Wilton	N/A	1,000	28%	42%	7%	7%	13%	–	2%	14
6 May 2021	2021 election		–	48.7%	39.7%	5.8%	3.6%	2.2%	–	–	9
