= 2021 West Midlands mayoral election =

Election in the West Midlands

- 6 May 2021
- Turnout: 31.2% ▲4.5%
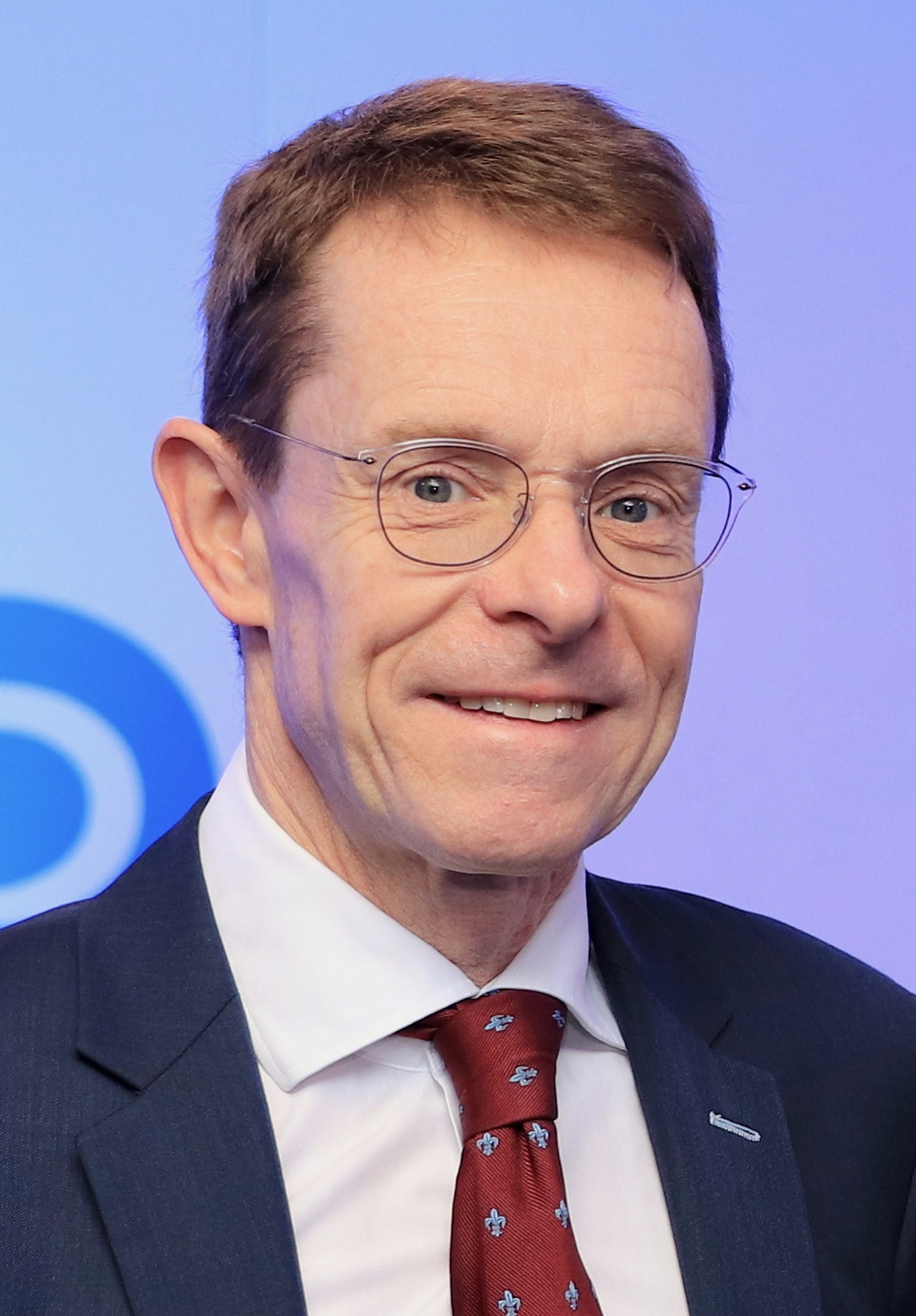

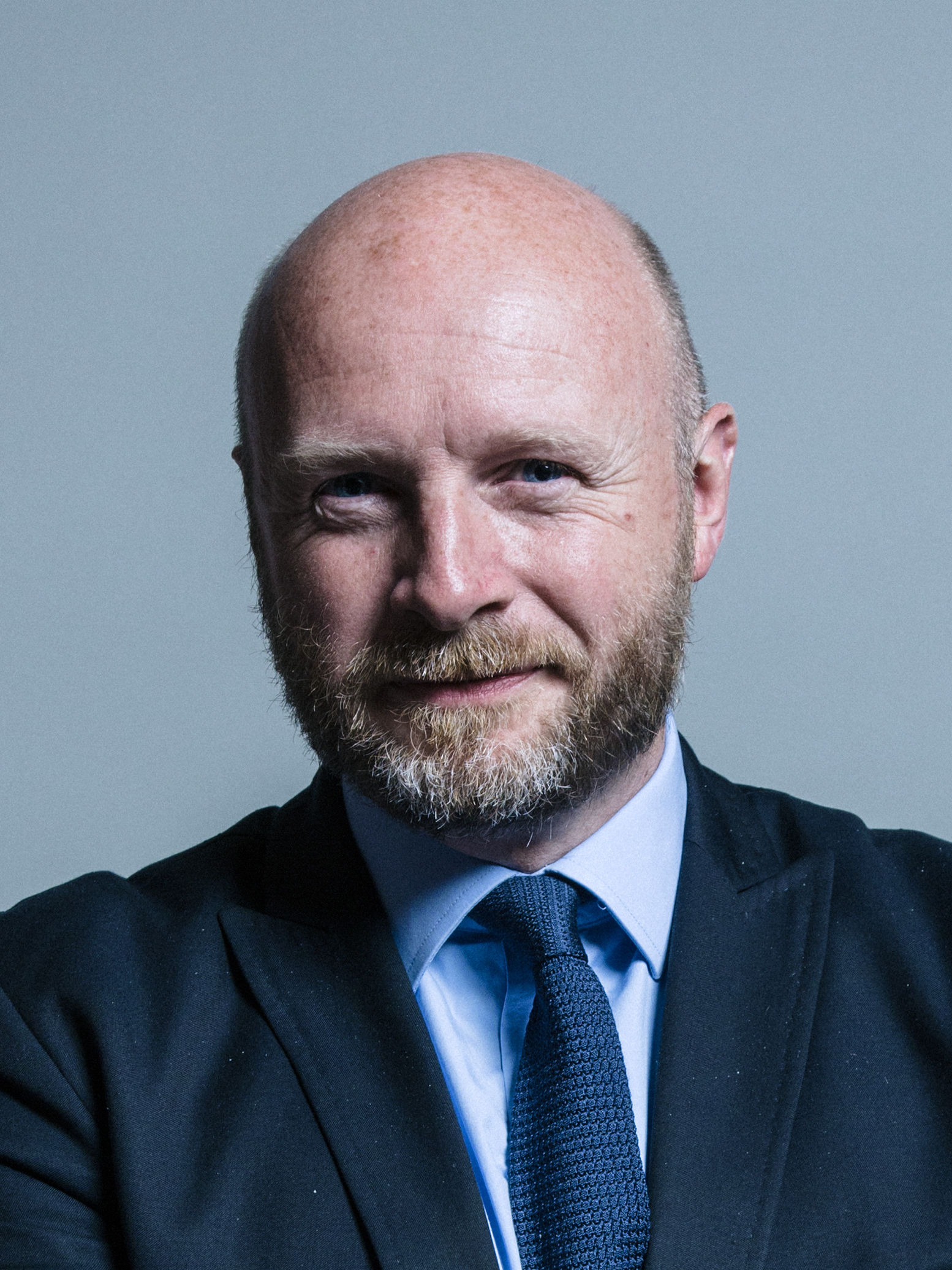

Candidate	Andy Street	Liam Byrne	Steve Caudwell
Party	Conservative	Labour Co-op	Green
First round	299,318 (48.7%) ▲6.8 pp	244,009 (39.7%) ▼1.0 pp	35,559 (5.8%) ▲1.1 pp
Second round	314,669 (54.0%) ▲3.6 pp	267,626 (46.0%) ▼3.6 pp	Eliminated
Mayor before election
Andy Street
Conservative
Elected Mayor
Andy Street
Conservative

The 2021 West Midlands mayoral election was held on 6 May 2021 to elect the mayor of the West Midlands, on the same day as other local elections across England and Wales, including councillors in six of its seven boroughs and the police and crime commissioner for the West Midlands city region. This was the second election for the post, which had its first election in 2017 due to the Cities and Local Government Devolution Act 2016. The mayor was elected using the supplementary vote system. The election was originally due to take place in May 2020, but was postponed due to the coronavirus pandemic.

The incumbent Conservative mayor Andy Street was seeking re-election. The Labour Party selected the Member of Parliament (MP) for Birmingham Hodge Hill, Liam Byrne, a former Cabinet minister under Prime Minister Gordon Brown, who ran as a Labour and Co-operative Party candidate, whilst the Liberal Democrats chose previous Parliamentary candidate for Sutton Coldfield Jenny Wilkinson.

== Background ==
The West Midlands is the second most populous city-region of the United Kingdom after Greater London. The position of Mayor of the West Midlands was created in 2017 following a devolution agreement between the UK government and the West Midlands Combined Authority (WMCA). The Cities and Local Government Devolution Act 2016 required a directly elected metro mayor for combined authorities to receive additional powers from central government. Under the terms of the devolution deal, the first mayoral term was set to last until 2020, followed by elections every four years. In the inaugural election in 2017, the Conservative candidate Andy Street defeated Labour's Siôn Simon in the final round with 50.4% of the vote.

Prior to the election, the think tank Centre for Cities looked at the results of local elections in West Midlands for 2018 and 2019 to make a prediction of the result and found little movement for Labour and the Conservatives, describing the election as remaining on a "knife-edge". On 12 December 2019 a general election took place in which the Conservatives secured an 80-seat majority, making it the worst seat performance for the Labour Party since the 1935 general election. In further analysis, the Centre for Cities assessed the two parties performance in the West Midlands city region, saw the Conservatives having an advantage going into this election. Paul Waugh of the Huffington Post saw the election as a "tough mountain for [Liam] Byrne to climb". In contrast, writer for the New Statesman, Stephen Bush argued this is a difficult election for the Conservatives saying that the change in Labour's national leadership and being several months after Brexit would change the dynamic of the election.

The election was postponed until 2021 due to the COVID-19 pandemic. The change in election date is to be ignored when calculating the four-yearly election cycle, so the following election will be held in 2024 and the Mayoral Term of Office in 2021 will accordingly be reduced to three years.

Street lobbied the government to integrate the Police and Crime Commissioner (PCC) role within the mayoral position in time for the 2020 election. This would have put the role's powers on policing in line with both the mayors of London and Greater Manchester. However, this broke down as the Combined Authority struggled with Street's lack of transparency. A public consultation ran in 2019 saw over 6,000 respondents and 58% supported the integration of the PCC role into the metro mayor. However, concern was expressed that local Conservative groups had encouraged people to fill in multiple responses. In June 2020, Street signed a plan to create a West Midlands National Park, in cooperation with councils in and around the city-region. In February 2021, the WMCA and mayor agreed on a budget and digital strategy for the project. That same month, a five year plan for decarbonising industry in the West Midlands was drafted for the WMCA.

== Electoral system ==
The election used a supplementary vote system, in which voters express a first and a second preference of candidates:

- If a candidate receives over 50% of the first preference vote the candidate wins
- If no candidate receives an overall majority, i.e., over 50% of first preference votes, the top two candidates proceed to a second round and all other candidates are eliminated
- The first preference votes for the remaining two candidates stand in the final count
- Voters' ballots whose first and second preference candidates are eliminated are discarded
- Voters whose first preference candidates have been eliminated and whose second preference candidate is in the top two have their second preference votes added to the count

This means that the winning candidate has the support of a majority of voters who expressed a preference among the top two.

All registered electors (British, Commonwealth, Irish and European) living the metropolitan boroughs of Birmingham, Coventry, Dudley, Sandwell, Solihull, Walsall, and Wolverhampton aged 18 or over are entitled to vote in the mayoral election.

== Campaign ==
Prior to the election campaign in December 2019, Street stated that council tax across the city region may have to increase in 2021. Street set targets of delivering 215,000 homes in the city region by 2030 as well as the West Midlands becoming carbon neutral by 2041. On 4 February, Street released a prospective metro map for the West Midlands, planned to be built by 2040 should he get elected. The plan featured eight lines for the West Midlands Metro tram network and 21 new train stations. The branding used on the map puts Street's name in green rather than blue and with no branding associated with the Conservatives.

Liam Byrne, an MP and former minister, was selected as the Labour candidate in February 2020. He made reducing homelessness in the city region a core part of his campaign and making the city carbon neutral by introducing a Green New Deal for the West Midlands. He appointed Beverley Nielsen, who had been the Liberal Democrat candidate in the 2017 mayoral election, to be his climate lead.

Ashvir Sangha, a social entrepreneur and former organiser in the 'Brum Young Leaders' programme, was standing as an independent candidate. He laid out his launch into politics with the slogan "Our West Midlands", and set out his six key commitments for the city-region. In early April, Sangha withdrew his candidacy and endorsed Andy Street.

In February 2021, Green candidate Steve Caudwell was critical of government restrictions on campaigning - such as a restriction on volunteers to distribute leaflet; as it restricts smaller, more financially constrained parties.

== Candidates and party selections ==
Candidates were required to be aged 18 or over and be a British, Commonwealth or European Union citizen. In addition they should fulfil one of the following: be registered to vote in the WMCA area; own or occupy land in the area for 12 months before their nomination; work in the WMCA for 12 months before their nomination; or have lived in the WMCA during the 12 months before their nomination. Candidates are also required to present 100 signatures of people on the electoral register, with 10 from each constituent authority, and provide a £5,000 deposit to be returned if the candidate receives more than 5% in the first round.

=== Conservative Party ===
Andy Street was re-selected as the Conservative candidate in September 2019. He was previously the managing director of John Lewis.

=== Labour Party ===
Liam Byrne, MP for Birmingham Hodge Hill, was selected as Labour's candidate in February 2020. Five politicians showed interest in standing. Two of them: Neena Gill a Member of the European Parliament and Lynda Waltho, former MP for Stourbridge withdrew their candidacy. The candidates for selection were Byrne, Pete Lowe, a former leader of Dudley Council and vice chair of the West Midlands Combined Authority and Salma Yaqoob, the former leader of the Respect Party.

The Labour Party delayed their plan to announce their candidate in November 2019 due to the 2019 General Election. The candidates were voted on by Labour Party members in the West Midlands, with the result announced in February 2020. This was considered late as Labour selected their candidate for the previous election in August 2016 ahead of the May 2017 election. Byrne was announced as the party's candidate on 6 February, with 6,948 valid votes being cast, a significant increase from the 3,817 recorded for the 2017 candidate selection. There was also five rejected ballots from the first round and a total of 698 votes non-transferable for the second round.

Byrne was considered more centrist than the other two candidates, who were seen as being on the left of the party. In Byrne's selection campaign he promoted ideas including the West Midlands being a "region of sanctuary" for refugees and municipal socialist policies for the city region. He also promoted his positive relationship and endorsement from the then shadow chancellor John McDonnell. Journalists including Sienna Rodgers and Stephen Bush noted that his success in the selection could be seen as a boost for Keir Starmer's campaign for national Labour leadership.

==== Selection results ====
2021 Labour West Midlands mayoral candidate selection
Party	Candidate	1st round		2nd round			1st round votesTransfer votes, 2nd round
Party	Candidate	Total	Of round	Transfers	Total	Of round	1st round votesTransfer votes, 2nd round
Labour	Liam Byrne	3,105	43.2%	425	3,530	56.5%	
Labour	Pete Lowe	2,034	28.9%	686	2,720	43.5%	
Labour	Salma Yaqoob	1,809	26.2%				

=== Liberal Democrats ===
Jenny Wilkinson, who stood for the party in Sutton Coldfield at the 2017 and 2019 general elections was selected in December 2020. She also stood for the party for the West Midlands region in the 2019 European Parliament Election. This was after their original selection of Beverley Nielsen, the party's candidate in the 2017 West Midlands mayoral election (announced as the party's candidate in January 2020,) stood down as Mayoral Candidate in July 2020 citing the struggle to balance the added year of campaigning brought on by the election delay to due the COVID-19 pandemic. She subsequently resigned from the party, along with three other Malvern Hills District Council Lib Dems, in protest after the group's new leader pulled out of the authority's ruling coalition administration. Nielsen was later appointed Liam Byrne's Climate Tsar for the Labour candidate's campaign.

Wilkinson was well known in her local area, notably for a campaign to save public libraries from closure, as she believed they played a vital part in local communities.

=== Green Party ===
Steve Caudwell, the party's group leader on Solihull Council and the party's only opposition leader in the West Midlands was announced as the party's candidate in January 2021. He was standing for: "An end to the West Midlands Poverty Scandal, a genuinely Green Industrial Revolution, and a transport system you can actually use." They had originally selected the chair of Hednesford Town Council, Kathryn Downs. Downs and other councillors resigned their party memberships to create a new independent group of councillors in June 2020.

=== Reform UK ===
Pete Durnell, who stood as UKIP's candidate in 2017 and finished 4th but saved his deposit with 5.6% of the 1st round vote, was announced as Reform UK's candidate on 1 April.

=== Candidates who intended to stand, but did not ===
- Tim Weller, a transport campaigner, sought to stand as an independent candidate.
- Colin Rankine, the Leader of West Midlands based Christian party Yeshua.

=== Withdrawn candidate ===
Ashvir Sangha, a social entrepreneur, was an independent candidate, under the 'Our West Midlands' slogan, before his withdrawal on 6 April 2021 to endorse the incumbent mayor Andy Street.

== Opinion polling ==
=== First Preferences ===
Graph of opinion polls conducted

=== Final Round ===
Graph of opinion polls conducted

Pollster	Client	Date(s) conducted	Sample size	First preference						Final round		
Pollster	Client	Date(s) conducted	Sample size	Street	Byrne	Wilkinson	Caudwell	Others	Lead	Street	Byrne	Lead
Pollster	Client	Date(s) conducted	Sample size	Con	Lab	Lib Dem	Green	Others	Lead	Con	Lab	Lead
Election		6 May 2021		48.7%	39.7%	3.6%	5.8%	2.2%	9%	54%	46%	8%
Opinium	The Times	19–26 April	971	54%	37%	3%	4%	3%	14%	59%	41%	18%
Redfield and Wilton	N/A	18–21 April	1,000	46%	37%	6%	5%	3%	9%	—	—	—
Find Out Now/Electoral Calculus	Daily Telegraph	1–7 April	1,000	45%	38%	4%	8%	5%	7%	52%	48%	4%
Election		4 May 2017		41.9%	40.8%	5.9%	4.7%	6.7%	1.1%	50.4%	49.6%	0.8%

== Results ==
2021 West Midlands Mayoral election vote share map by Metropolitan Borough(2nd round).

West Midlands Mayoral Election – 6 May 2021
Party	Candidate	1st round		2nd round			1st round votesTransfer votes, 2nd round
Party	Candidate	Total	Of round	Transfers	Total	Of round	1st round votesTransfer votes, 2nd round
Conservative	Andy Street	299,318	48.73%	15,351	314,669	54.04%	
Labour Co-op	Liam Byrne	244,009	39.72%	23,617	267,626	45.96%	
Green	Steve Caudwell	35,559	5.79%				
Liberal Democrats	Jenny Wilkinson	21,836	3.55%				
Reform	Pete Durnell	13,568	2.21%				
Majority					47,043	8.08%	
Turnout		614,290					
Total votes		626,180	31.23%				

=== Birmingham ===
West Midlands Mayoral Election 2021, City of Birmingham
Party	Candidate	1st round		2nd round			1st round votesTransfer votes, 2nd round
Party	Candidate	Total	Of round	Transfers	Total	Of round	1st round votesTransfer votes, 2nd round
Labour Co-op	Liam Byrne	102,276	48.2%	9,816	112,092	55.63%	
Conservative	Andy Street	84,817	39.9%	4,583	89,400	44.37%	
Green	Steve Caudwell	12,435	5.9%				
Liberal Democrats	Jenny Wilkinson	9,294	4.4%				
Reform	Pete Durnell	3,496	1.6%				
Majority					22,692	11.26%	
Turnout		212,318					
Total votes		217,153					

=== Coventry ===
West Midlands Mayoral Election 2021, City of Coventry
Party	Candidate	1st round		2nd round			1st round votesTransfer votes, 2nd round
Party	Candidate	Total	Of round	Transfers	Total	Of round	1st round votesTransfer votes, 2nd round
Labour Co-op	Liam Byrne	32,358	43.6%	3,585	35,943	51.77%	
Conservative	Andy Street	31,380	42.2%	2,111	33,491	48.23%	
Green	Steve Caudwell	5,824	7.8%				
Liberal Democrats	Jenny Wilkinson	2,815	3.8%				
Reform	Pete Durnell	1,895	2.6%				
Majority							
Turnout		74,272					
Total votes		75,964					

=== Dudley ===
West Midlands Mayoral Election 2021, Metropolitan Borough of Dudley
Party	Candidate	1st round		2nd round			1st round votesTransfer votes, 2nd round
Party	Candidate	Total	Of round	Transfers	Total	Of round	1st round votesTransfer votes, 2nd round
Conservative	Andy Street	50,787	63.3%	1,821	52,608	68.54%	
Labour Co-op	Liam Byrne	21,940	27.4%	2,210	24,150	31.46%	
Green	Steve Caudwell	3,360	4.2%				
Reform	Pete Durnell	2,083	2.6%				
Liberal Democrats	Jenny Wilkinson	2,005	2.5%				
Majority							
Turnout		80,175					
Total votes		81,541					

=== Sandwell ===
West Midlands Mayoral Election 2021, Metropolitan Borough of Sandwell
Party	Candidate	1st round		2nd round			1st round votesTransfer votes, 2nd round
Party	Candidate	Total	Of round	Transfers	Total	Of round	1st round votesTransfer votes, 2nd round
Labour Co-op	Liam Byrne	33,047	47.6%	1,916	34,963	54.43%	
Conservative	Andy Street	27,876	40.2%	1,401	29,277	45.57%	
Green	Steve Caudwell	2,589	3.7%				
Reform	Pete Durnell	2,281	3.3%				
Liberal Democrats	Jenny Wilkinson	1,647	2.4%				
Majority							
Turnout		67,440	29%				

=== Solihull ===
West Midlands Mayoral Election 2021, Metropolitan Borough of Solihull
Party	Candidate	1st round		2nd round			1st round votesTransfer votes, 2nd round
Party	Candidate	Total	Of round	Transfers	Total	Of round	1st round votesTransfer votes, 2nd round
Conservative	Andy Street	41,664	67.6%	3,033	44,697	78.38%	
Labour Co-op	Liam Byrne	9,512	15.4%	2,815	12,327	21.62%	
Green	Steve Caudwell	6,475	10.5%				
Liberal Democrats	Jenny Wilkinson	2,823	4.6%				
Reform	Pete Durnell	1,119	1.8%				
Majority							
Turnout		61,596					

=== Walsall ===
West Midlands Mayoral Election 2021, Walsall
Party	Candidate	1st round		2nd round			1st round votesTransfer votes, 2nd round
Party	Candidate	Total	Of round	Transfers	Total	Of round	1st round votesTransfer votes, 2nd round
Conservative	Andy Street	35,010	60.0%	1,258	36,268	62.84%	
Labour Co-op	Liam Byrne	19,887	32.4%	1,556	21,443	37.16%	
Green	Steve Caudwell	2,126	3.5%				
Liberal Democrats	Jenny Wilkinson	1,676	2.7%				
Reform	Pete Durnell	1,512	2.5%				
Majority							
Turnout		61,447					

=== Wolverhampton ===
West Midlands Mayoral Election 2021, City of Wolverhampton
Party	Candidate	1st round		2nd round			1st round votesTransfer votes, 2nd round
Party	Candidate	Total	Of round	Transfers	Total	Of round	1st round votesTransfer votes, 2nd round
Conservative	Andy Street	27,784	47.7%	1,144	28,928	52.00%	
Labour Co-op	Liam Byrne	24,989	42.9%	1,719	26,708	48.00%	
Green	Steve Caudwell	2,750	4.7%				
Liberal Democrats	Jenny Wilkinson	1,576	2.7%				
Reform	Pete Durnell	1,182	2.0%				
Majority					2,228	4.00%	
Turnout		58,281					
