= Mayor Street =

Mayor Street may refer to:

- Andy Street (born 1963), mayor of the West Midlands, United Kingdom
- John F. Street (born 1943), mayor of Philadelphia, Pennsylvania, United States
