= 2017 West Midlands mayoral election =

Mayoral election held in the West Midlands, England

- 4 May 2017
- Turnout: 523,201 (26.7%)
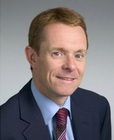

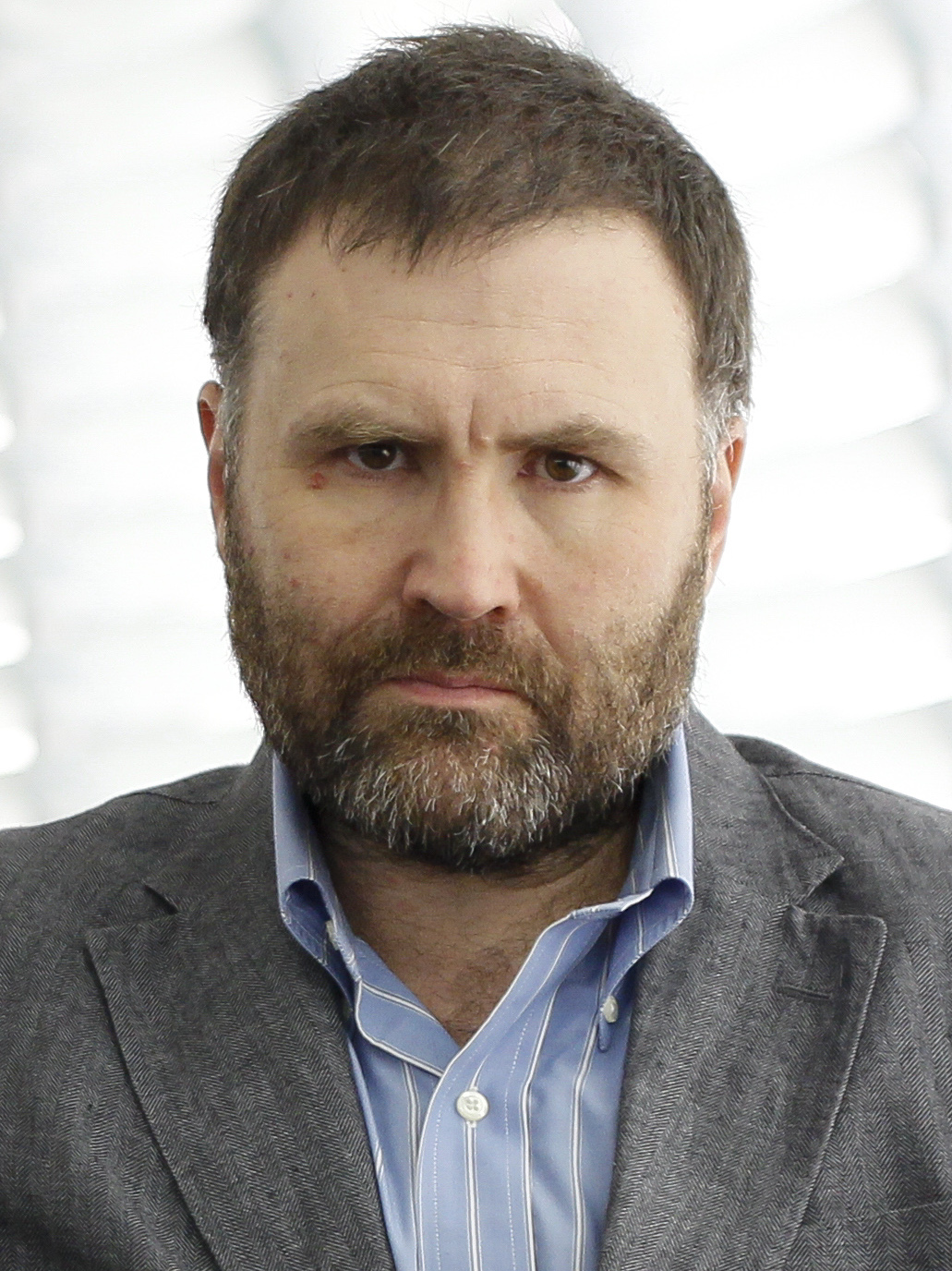

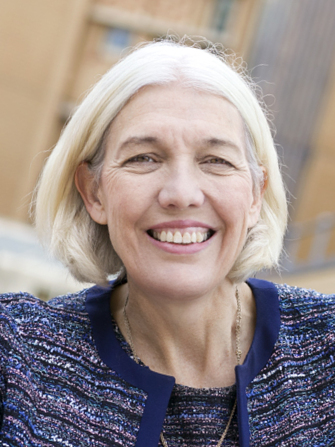
Candidate	Andy Street	Siôn Simon
Party	Conservative	Labour Co-op
First round	216,280 (41.9%)	210,259 (40.8%)
Second round	238,628 (50.4%)	234,862 (49.6%)
Candidate	Beverley Nielsen	Pete Durnell
Party	Liberal Democrats	UKIP
First round	30,378 (5.9%)	29,051 (5.6%)
Mayor before election
Position established
Elected Mayor
Andy Street
Conservative

The inaugural West Midlands mayoral election was held on 4 May 2017 to elect the Mayor of the West Midlands, with subsequent elections to be held every four years from May 2020. The election took place alongside five elections for English metro mayors and other local elections, and ahead of the general election on 8 June 2017.

The contest was the first election for a governing body covering the entire West Midlands since the 1981 West Midlands County Council election, the former West Midlands County Council having been dissolved in 1986. Police and crime commissioner elections had taken in 2012, 2014 and 2016 with Labour winning those contests decisively.

The election was won by Conservative Andy Street, beating Labour's Siôn Simon in the final round by 50.4% to 49.6% with a turnout of 26.7%. The result was seen as a shock in what has been considered a Labour heartland.

== Results ==
West Midlands Mayoral Election 2017
Party	Candidate	1st round		2nd round			1st round votesTransfer votes, 2nd round
Party	Candidate	Total	Of round	Transfers	Total	Of round	1st round votesTransfer votes, 2nd round
Conservative	Andy Street	216,280	41.9%	22,348	238,628	50.4%	
Labour Co-op	Siôn Simon	210,259	40.8%	24,603	234,862	49.6%	
Liberal Democrats	Beverley Nielsen	30,378	5.9%				
UKIP	Pete Durnell	29,051	5.6%				
Green	James Burn	24,260	4.7%				
Communist	Graham Stevenson	5,696	1.1%				
Majority					3,776	0.8%	
Turnout		523,201	26.7%				
Conservative win							

== Background ==
Area covered by the mayor.

In 2012, a referendum on a proposal to have an elected mayor for the city of Birmingham resulted in a 57.8% vote against.

Following a devolution deal between the UK government and the West Midlands Combined Authority (WMCA), it was agreed to introduce a directly-elected mayor for the combined authority, with an initial election to be held in May 2017. The Cities and Local Government Devolution Act 2016 required a directly-elected metro mayor for combined authorities to receive additional powers from central government.

The mayor would be elected by voters in the metropolitan boroughs of Birmingham, Coventry, Dudley, Sandwell, Solihull, Walsall, and Wolverhampton, and act as chair of the combined authority as well exercise additional powers and functions devolved from central government relating to transport and housing and planning. The WMCA would also as a result receive further powers over economic growth, adult skills funding, employment, and business support.

== Electoral system ==
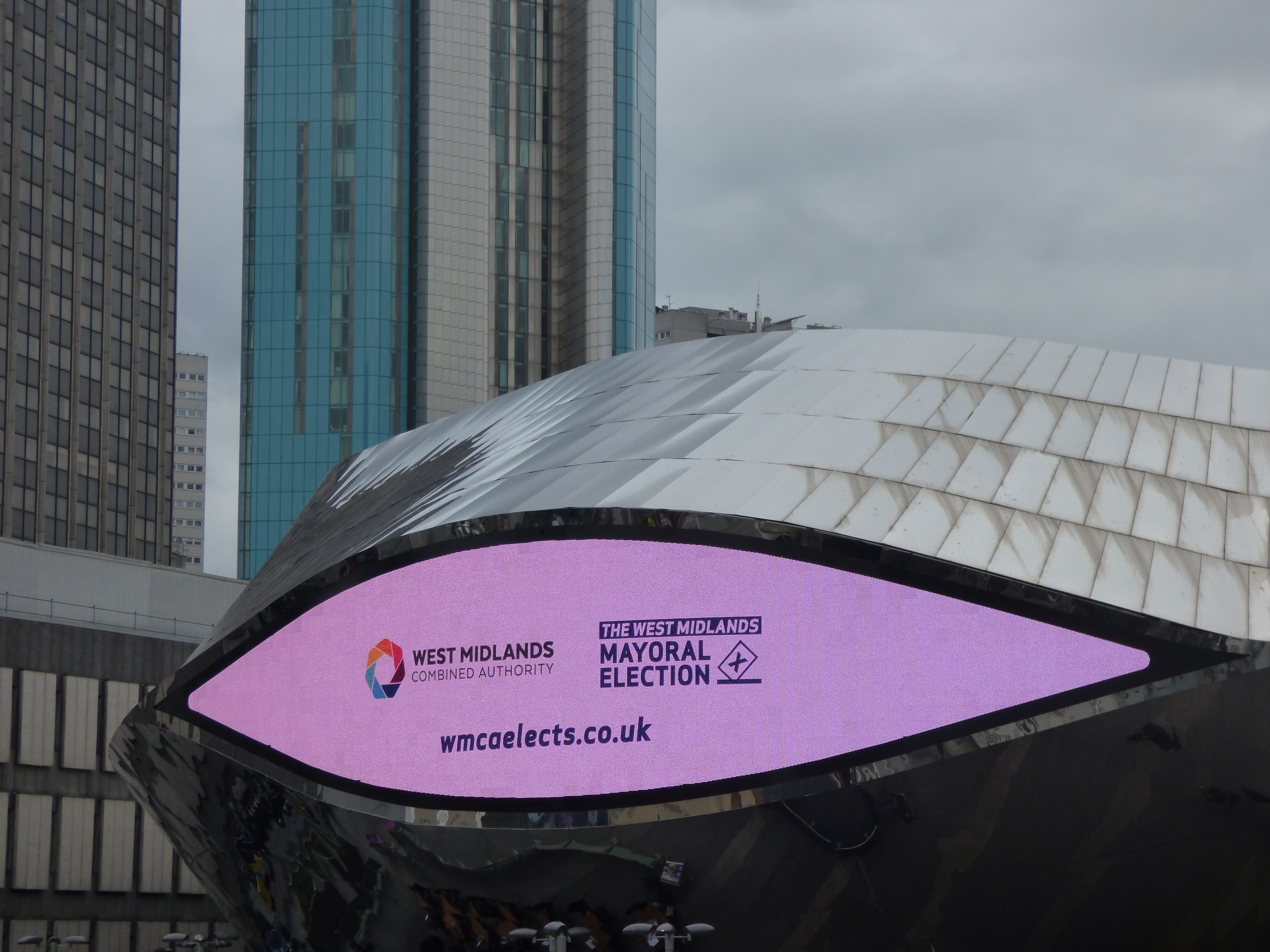
Advertisement for the election at the Birmingham New Street railway station

The supplementary vote system was used for the mayoral election. Voters were able to express a first and second preference on their ballots. If no candidate receives 50% of valid votes cast in the first round, the two candidates with the most votes proceed to the second round while all other candidates are eliminated. Any valid second preferences of eliminated candidates are redistributed to the remaining candidates, and the candidate with the most combined votes in the second round is declared the winner.

Eligible electors are registered to vote by 13 April 2017; British, Commonwealth or European Union citizens; aged 18 or over by 4 May 2017; and resident in the seven boroughs that make up the West Midlands Combined Authority (Birmingham, Coventry Dudley, Sandwell, Solihull, Walsall, and Wolverhampton).

On 27 April it was confirmed 1,961,153 people were eligible to vote in the mayoral election.

== Candidates ==
Candidates are required to be aged 18 or over and be a British, Commonwealth or European Union citizen. In addition they should fulfill one of the following: be registered to vote in the WMCA area; own or occupy land in the area for 12 months before their nomination; work in the WMCA for 12 months before their nomination; or have lived in the WMCA during the 12 months before their nomination.

Candidates are also required to present 100 signatures of people on the electoral register, with 10 from each constituent authority, and provide a £5,000 deposit to be returned if the candidate receives more than 5% in the first round.

Six candidates were successfully nominated by the deadline on 4 April 2017. They were James Burn of the Green Party; Pete Durnell of UKIP; Beverley Nielsen of the Liberal Democrats; Siôn Simon, who received the nominations of the Labour Party and the Co-operative Party; Graham Stevenson of the Communist Party of Britain; and Andy Street of the Conservative Party.

The first mayoral debate took place at the Black Country Living Museum on 7 March 2017 with five of the candidates represented.

=== Candidate selections ===
==== Communist Party of Britain ====
Graham Stevenson was announced as the Communist Party of Britain's candidate on 8 March 2017. Stevenson is a former official for the T&G trade union (now Unite the Union) and sits on his party's national executive committee.

==== Conservative Party ====
On 7 July 2016 it was confirmed Andy Street, the former managing director of John Lewis and former chair of the Greater Birmingham and Solihull Local Enterprise Partnership, would seek the Conservative Party's nomination for West Midlands Mayor. After no others came forward and a meeting of local members on 29 September, Street was announced as the party's candidate. Street's endorsements include that of former CBI director Lord Digby Jones.

Street defended spending up to £1 million before the regulated campaign period where spending was restricted to £130,000 in the final five weeks.

==== Co-operative Party ====
The Co-operative Party nominated Siôn Simon, MEP for the West Midlands and former MP for Birmingham Erdington, as its candidate in April 2017. The party has stood joint candidates with Labour since 1927.

==== Green Party of England and Wales ====
On 18 October 2016, James Burn was announced as the Green Party's candidate. Burn is a Green Party councillor for Chelmsley Wood and leader of the opposition on Solihull Council.

==== Labour Party ====
In January 2016, Labour's national executive committee agreed to select the party's candidate in July through a one-member-one-vote ballot. It was suggested candidates for the post could include West Midlands MEP Siôn Simon, Hodge Hill MP Liam Byrne, Dudley North MP Ian Austin and Sandwell council leader Darren Cooper. Edgbaston MP Gisela Stuart declined to enter.

Five candidates came forward by the 10 June deadline. They were Steve Bedser, a former cabinet member for Health and Wellbeing on Birmingham City Council; Najma Hafeez, a former Birmingham city councillor and chair of City Hospital; Milkinder Jaspal, a cabinet member on Wolverhampton City Council; Siôn Simon, an MEP for the West Midlands, former MP for Birmingham Erdington and former government minister for creative industries and further education; and Mary Simons-Jones, a freelance bookseller.

Bedser and Simon were shortlisted and went to a ballot among party members in Birmingham, Coventry, Dudley, Sandwell, Solihull, Walsall, and Wolverhampton.

On 9 August 2016 it was announced Simon had won the ballot with 2,718 votes to 1,099 for Bedser.

First round
Candidate	Votes	Percentage
Siôn Simon	2,718	71.21%
Steve Bedser	1,099	28.79%

==== Liberal Democrats ====
The Liberal Democrats announced Beverley Nielsen, a businesswoman and director of Birmingham City University, as their candidate on 7 September 2016.

==== UK Independence Party (UKIP) ====
On 6 January 2017 UKIP confirmed Pete Durnell as their candidate. Durnell stood for the party in the West Midlands police and crime commissioner election in 2016.

== Results by local authority ==
=== Birmingham ===
West Midlands Mayoral Election 2017, Birmingham
Party	Candidate	1st round		2nd round			1st round votesTransfer votes, 2nd round
Party	Candidate	Total	Of round	Transfers	Total	Of round	1st round votesTransfer votes, 2nd round
Labour Co-op	Siôn Simon	95,098	46.1%	10,382	105,480	56.5%	
Conservative	Andy Street	73,578	35.6%	7,690	81,268	43.5%	
Liberal Democrats	Beverley Nielsen	14,840	7.2%				
Green	James Burn	9,787	4.7%				
UKIP	Pete Durnell	7,537	3.7%				
Communist	Graham Stevenson	2,312	1.1%				
Majority					24,212		
Turnout		206,456	28.6%				

=== Coventry ===
West Midlands Mayoral Election 2017, Coventry
Party	Candidate	1st round		2nd round			1st round votesTransfer votes, 2nd round
Party	Candidate	Total	Of round	Transfers	Total	Of round	1st round votesTransfer votes, 2nd round
Labour Co-op	Siôn Simon	24,331	43.7%	3,236	27,567	55.0%	
Conservative	Andy Street	20,345	36.6%	2,213	22,558	45.0%	
Liberal Democrats	Beverley Nielsen	3,339	6.0%				
Green	James Burn	2,984	5.4%				
UKIP	Pete Durnell	2,928	5.3%				
Communist	Graham Stevenson	821	1.5%				
Majority					5,009		
Turnout		55,653	23.9				

=== Dudley ===
West Midlands Mayoral Election 2017, Dudley
Party	Candidate	1st round		2nd round			1st round votesTransfer votes, 2nd round
Party	Candidate	Total	Of round	Transfers	Total	Of round	1st round votesTransfer votes, 2nd round
Conservative	Andy Street	31,858	52.2%	3,306	35,164	63.5%	
Labour Co-op	Siôn Simon	17,731	29.0%	2,446	20,177	36.5%	
UKIP	Pete Durnell	5,637	9.2%				
Liberal Democrats	Beverley Nielsen	2,555	4.2%				
Green	James Burn	2,096	3.4%				
Communist	Graham Stevenson	623	1.0%				
Majority					14,987		
Turnout		61,088	25.2				

=== Sandwell ===
West Midlands Mayoral Election 2017, Sandwell
Party	Candidate	1st round		2nd round			1st round votesTransfer votes, 2nd round
Party	Candidate	Total	Of round	Transfers	Total	Of round	1st round votesTransfer votes, 2nd round
Labour Co-op	Siôn Simon	29,085	54.2%	2,476	31,561	65.5%	
Conservative	Andy Street	14,361	26.8%	2,260	16,621	34.5%	
UKIP	Pete Durnell	4,704	8.8%				
Green	James Burn	2,032	3.8%				
Liberal Democrats	Beverley Nielsen	2,029	3.8%				
Communist	Graham Stevenson	672	1.3%				
Majority					14,940		
Turnout		53,657	23.3				

=== Solihull ===
West Midlands Mayoral Election 2017, Solihull
Party	Candidate	1st round		2nd round			1st round votesTransfer votes, 2nd round
Party	Candidate	Total	Of round	Transfers	Total	Of round	1st round votesTransfer votes, 2nd round
Conservative	Andy Street	35,903	67.9%	2,981	38,884	81.3%	
Labour Co-op	Siôn Simon	6,695	12.7%	2,256	8,951	18.7%	
Green	James Burn	4,102	7.8%				
Liberal Democrats	Beverley Nielsen	3,578	6.8%				
UKIP	Pete Durnell	1,833	3.5%				
Communist	Graham Stevenson	256	0.5%				
Majority					29,933		
Turnout		52,871	33.7				

=== Walsall ===
West Midlands Mayoral Election 2017, Walsall
Party	Candidate	1st round		2nd round			1st round votesTransfer votes, 2nd round
Party	Candidate	Total	Of round	Transfers	Total	Of round	1st round votesTransfer votes, 2nd round
Conservative	Andy Street	23,694	48.9%	2,186	25,880	58.3%	
Labour Co-op	Siôn Simon	16,725	34.5%	1,811	18,536	41.7%	
UKIP	Pete Durnell	3,501	7.2%				
Liberal Democrats	Beverley Nielsen	2,047	4.2%				
Green	James Burn	1,465	3.0%				
Communist	Graham Stevenson	442	0.9%				
Majority					7,344		
Turnout		48,468	24.6				

=== Wolverhampton ===
West Midlands Mayoral Election 2017, Wolverhampton
Party	Candidate	1st round		2nd round			1st round votesTransfer votes, 2nd round
Party	Candidate	Total	Of round	Transfers	Total	Of round	1st round votesTransfer votes, 2nd round
Labour Co-op	Siôn Simon	20,594	45.8%	1,996	22,590	55.3%	
Conservative	Andy Street	16,514	36.7%	1,712	18,226	44.7%	
UKIP	Pete Durnell	2,911	6.5%				
Liberal Democrats	Beverley Nielsen	1,990	4.4%				
Green	James Burn	1,794	4.0%				
Communist	Graham Stevenson	570	1.3%				
Majority					4,364		
Turnout		45,008	25.2				
