= West Midlands Combined Authority =

Strategic authority and combined authority in England

- West Midlands Combined Authority within England

Type
- Type: Combined authority
- Houses: Unicameral
- Term limits: None

History
- Founded: 17 June 2016
- Preceded by: West Midlands County Council

Leadership
- Mayor: Richard Parker, Labour since 6 May 2024
- Deputy Mayor: Stephen Simkins, Labour since 12 June 2026
- Chief Executive (interim): Ed Cox since June 2025

Structure
- Seats: Mayor + 7 Council Leaders
- Political groups: Constituent members Labour (5) Conservative (4) Reform UK (4) Liberal Democrats (1) Green (1)

Elections
- Voting system: First past the post
- Last election: 2 May 2024
- Next election: 4 May 2028

Meeting place
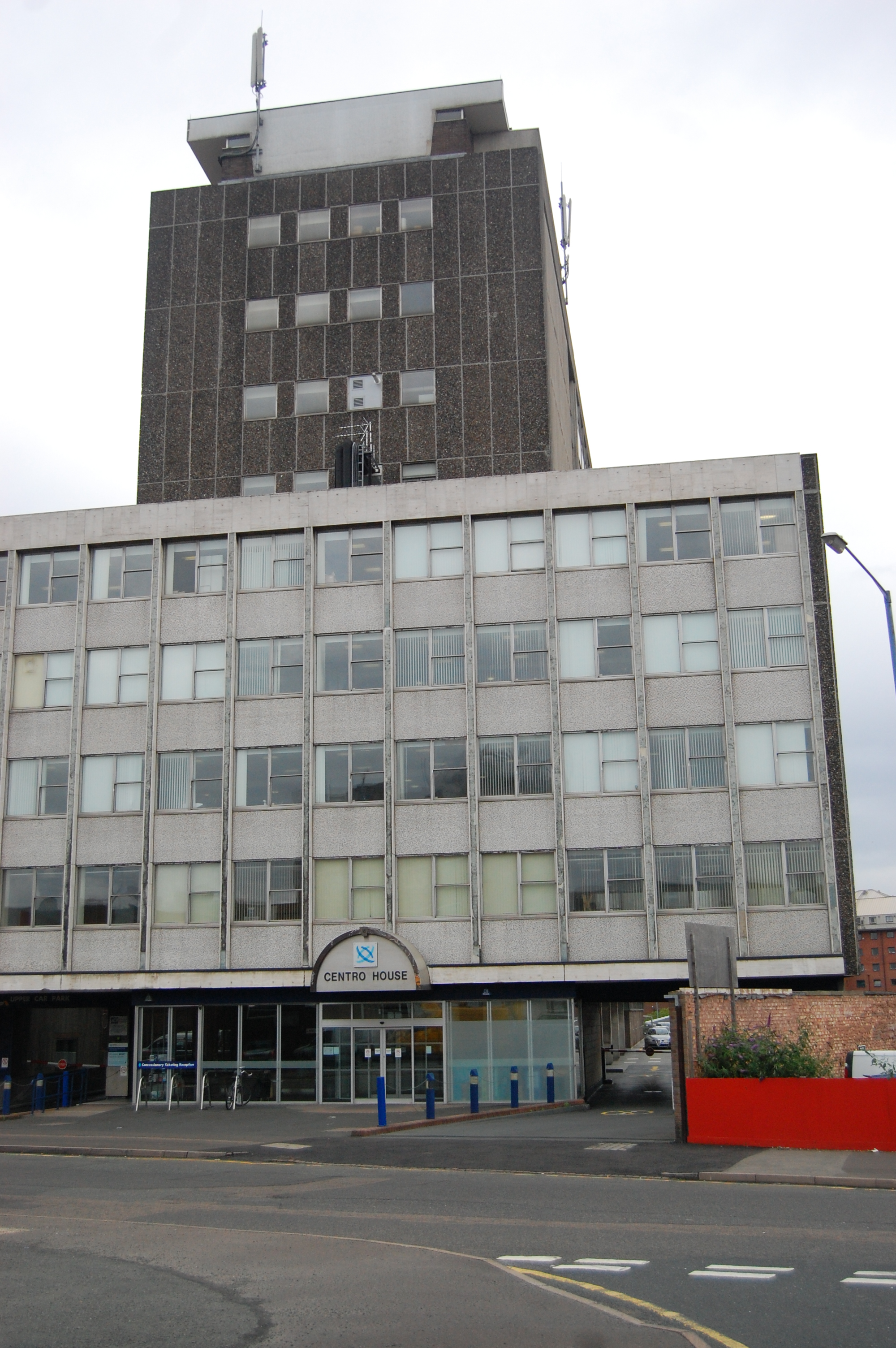
- 16 Summer Lane, Birmingham, B19 3SD

Website
- www.wmca.org.uk

The West Midlands Combined Authority (WMCA) is the combined authority for the ceremonial county of the West Midlands, England, comprising the county's seven metropolitan borough councils. It was established on 17 June 2016 by statutory instrument under the Local Democracy, Economic Development and Construction Act 2009. It is a strategic authority with powers over transport, economic development and regeneration.

== Structure ==
The authority consists of seven indirectly elected constituent members, each a directly elected councillor from one of the seven West Midlands county local authorities, as well as the Mayor of the West Midlands, who is directly elected by the county's residents.

There are currently thirteen non-constituent members, made up of three Local Enterprise Partnerships, as well as ten local authorities from outside the West Midlands county. There are also four 'observer organisations' (organisations awaiting non-constituent membership and non-voting observers).

Laura Shoaf became CEO on 10 November 2021, and in May 2025 announced her intention to stand down from 17 June. She was appointed a Commander of the Order of the British Empire (CBE) in the 2022 New Year Honours "for services to economic regeneration in the West Midlands", having previously been managing director of Transport for West Midlands.

== History ==
The abolition of the West Midlands County Council in 1986 left the county without a single authority covering the whole area, although some council functions continued to be provided jointly, through the West Midlands Joint Committee, the West Midlands Integrated Transport Authority, West Midlands Police (initially under the oversight of the West Midlands Police Authority and currently overseen by the directly elected West Midlands Police and Crime Commissioner) and West Midlands Fire Service.

The authority has previously (incorrectly) been referred to as the Greater Birmingham Combined Authority, or simply Greater Birmingham, as the final model and membership was worked out and negotiated. Greater Birmingham is a term present in the current Local Enterprise Partnership which serves Birmingham, Solihull and some additional local council areas within the West Midlands.

== Organisation ==
The authority's initial priorities involved co-ordinating the city-region to act as one place on certain issues, such as international promotion and investment; reforming public services such as mental health services; and improving internal and external transport links.

=== Transport for West Midlands ===
Transport for West Midlands (TfWM) is an executive body of the WMCA that oversees transportation (road, rail, bus and Metro) within the metropolitan county. The organisation carries over the previous responsibilities of Centro (the West Midlands Passenger Transport Executive). TfWM has a similar level of responsibility to Transport for London - although its responsibility for highways is limited to a defined set of major routes (the West Midlands Key Route Network). TfWM's policies and strategy are set by the WMCA's transport delivery committee.

Transport for West Midlands operates the West Midlands Metro tram system, and is currently expanding the system from Birmingham City centre to Birmingham Airport, and to the west to Brierley Hill via the Merry Hill Shopping Centre. Metro extensions are planned and constructed through the Midland Metro Alliance, of which TfWM is a member.

TfWM is also looking at improvements to the M5 and M6 motorways, and new cycle routes as part of a metropolitan cycle network. There are also plans to work with central government over the future of the underused M6 Toll.

In May 2025 it was announced that the West Midlands bus network would be brought back under public control for the first time since the 1980s, with TfWM becoming responsible for franchising bus services to private operators, and setting the fares, timetables and routes of the bus services operating in the county. This is expected to take effect in late 2027.

=== Housing and planning ===
While local planning will remain in the hands of the seven boroughs, the WMCA will be able to analyse county-wide brownfield sites and decide where new homes should be built.

=== Health ===
A mental health commission was formed in order to create a reformed mental healthcare system in the county. The WMCA will not, however, have control over a devolved NHS budget, as is the case in Greater Manchester.

=== Youth Engagement ===
The WMCA has co-run the West Midlands Young Combined Authority with Birmingham-based organisation Aspire4U CIC, via its specific project named LyfeProof, since June 2021, and before that with the Beatfreeks Collective from September 2019 to May 2021. Upon its establishment in September 2019, the YCA had 33 members aged between 16 and 25 years old, drawn from all seven constituent local authorities. The members of the YCA are appointed by the Combined Authority Board, and they have provided an update on its work at each WMCA Board meeting since January 2020.

At the close of the first session of the YCA in August 2020, the number of members had reduced to 16, and it was agreed that the YCA would adopt a bicameral approach to its operation, featuring a core YCA board, combined with a YCA community, who would comment on the work of the WMCA and YCA.

The YCA board was reformed in September 2020, and between October 2020 and November 2021 was co-chaired by Aisha Masood, a member from Birmingham, and Chris Burden, from Wolverhampton, who was elected councillor for the Fallings Park ward at the 2021 Wolverhampton City Council election. It functions as a scrutiny and campaign body, and for 2020/21 had co-leads who dedicated to comment and engaged on the work of relevant WMCA portfolio leads. In November 2021, the YCA were awarded The Chair's Award, at the Royal Town Planning Institute's West Midlands Awards for Planning Excellence, for the publication of a Vision and Priorities document in February 2021.

After further recruitment, the body had about 25 members and was chaired in 2021–2022 by Kashmire Hawker of Wolverhampton, a candidate for Tettenhall Regis at the 2022 City of Wolverhampton Council election, and Lily Eaves of Coventry.

A further review of the YCA's structure was undertaken in autumn 2022, with detail on specifics to be confirmed.

== Mayor of West Midlands ==
In 2017, the West Midlands, like several other city regions, elected a 'metro mayor' with similar powers to the Mayor of London. A directly elected mayor for the combined authority area was described as 'inevitable', as such a role had been stated as a conditional requirement for a more powerful devolution deal. The WMCA shadow board submitted proposals for a combined authority with and without a mayor leader, and decided which plan of action to take based on the devolution proposals from the government for each. Powers sought for a regional metro mayor and the WMCA were first revealed in a leaked bid document first reported by Simon Gilbert, of the Coventry Telegraph. Those powers included the ability of the mayor to levy extra business rates from companies in the region. Negotiations also included the desire to take away the ability of local councils to retain future business rates growth and to hand that cash to the WMCA, who would decide how it was spent across the region instead of by individual local authorities.

The date of the first mayoral election was 4 May 2017. The election was won by Andy Street of the Conservative Party, with 50.4% of the votes in the second round against Sion Simon, the then Labour Party Member of the European Parliament for the West Midlands. Street was re-elected in May 2021's election, with an increased vote share of 54.04% in the second round vote against Liam Byrne, Birmingham Hodge Hill's Labour Party Member of Parliament. Richard Parker of the Labour Party won the 2024 election, held on 2 May 2024, narrowly defeating Street, who was running for a third term.

The mayor is a member of the Mayoral Council for England and the Council of the Nations and Regions.

== Membership ==
As of June 2026, the membership of the Combined Authority's Board were as follows:

Colour key (for political parties): Conservative Labour/Labour Co-op Reform UK Liberal Democrats Green Independent/Non-political

Constituent membership		
Names of Members	Nominating Authority	Position Within Nominating Authority
Richard Parker (Chair)	West Midlands Combined Authority	Mayor of the West Midlands
Roger Harmer	Birmingham City Council	Leader of the Council
Julien Pritchard	Birmingham City Council	Deputy Leader of the Council
George Duggins and Abdul Khan	Coventry City Council	Leader and Deputy Leader of the Council
Patrick Harley and Paul Bradley	Dudley Metropolitan Borough Council	Leader and Deputy Leader of the Council
Ray Nock and Gary Dale	Sandwell Metropolitan Borough Council	Leader and Deputy Leader of the Council
Karen Grinsell and Heather Delaney	Solihull Metropolitan Borough Council	Leader and Deputy Leader of the Council
Elaine Williams and Nicky Barker	Walsall Metropolitan Borough Council	Leader and Deputy Leader of the Council
Stephen Simpkins (Deputy Chair) and Steve Evans	City of Wolverhampton Council	Leader and Deputy Leader of the Council
Non-constituent membership		
Paul Jones	Cannock Chase District Council	Leader of the Council
David Wright	North Warwickshire Borough Council	Leader of the Council
George Finch	Warwickshire County Council and Nuneaton and Bedworth Borough Council	Leader of the Council
Matt Dormer	Redditch Borough Council	Leader of the Council
Louise Robinson	Rugby Borough Council	Leader of the Council
Heather Kidd	Shropshire Council	Leader of the Council
Susan Juned	Stratford-on-Avon District Council	Leader of the Council
Carol Dean	Tamworth Borough Council	Leader of the Council
Lee Carter	Telford and Wrekin Council	Leader of the Council
Ian Davison	Warwick District Council	Leader of the Council
Simon Foster	West Midlands Police	West Midlands Police and Crime Commissioner
TBD	West Midlands Fire Authority	
Rob Johnston		

== See also ==
- Combined authority
- Transport for West Midlands
- West Midlands Police and Crime Commissioner
- Greater Birmingham and Solihull Local Enterprise Partnership
- West Midlands County Council
- Evolution of Worcestershire county boundaries since 1844
