= Prosper UK =

British Conservative Party political movement

- Chairperson: Ruth Davidson; Andy Street
- Founders: Ruth Davidson; Andy Street; David Gauke; Amber Rudd; Gavin Barwell; Margot James; David Lidington
- Founded: January 2026
- Headquarters: 83 Victoria Street, London, SW1H 0HW
- Ideology: One-nation conservatism Green conservatism
- Political position: Centre to centre-right
- Slogan: A home for practical, pro-growth politics and a serious centre-right offer for the UK.

Website
- https://prosperuk.com/

Prosper UK is a British centre-right political movement launched in January 2026. The organisation was founded by Ruth Davidson, the former leader of the Scottish Conservatives, alongside Andy Street, the former Mayor of the West Midlands, David Gauke, a former Justice Secretary, and Amber Rudd, a former Home Secretary. Their aim is to appeal to what they say are 7 million "politically homeless" voters and to bring the Conservative Party back to the centre-right.

== Ideology and platform ==
Prosper UK set out to strive for a stronger, more prosperous, more confident United Kingdom, believing that growth is the overriding priority. The organisation describes itself as supporting

- A pro-business economy
- One Nation, liberty and the Union
- Security, borders and the rule of law
- Public services that work
- Climate, net zero and energy security
- An outward-looking UK

How Prosper UK intends to make their policies happen:

- Building a movement and a national network of supporters
- creating a recognisable public voice through media and digital platforms
- A policy programme rooted in the real economy

Prosper UK regularly publishes research and policy proposals on varying political topics.

Recent reports include; 'An Immigration Plan for Growth', 'Set up for Success? The greater case for devolution' and 'A Fairer Welfare System'.

The website's policy portal feature allows members of the public to suggest policy ideas to 'help shape the next generation of centre-right policy'.

== History and origin ==
Prosper UK was launched in London on the 26th January 2026. At the launch, Davidson claimed many people in the UK felt unrepresented by any of the current main parties, arguing that Conservative Party leader Kemi Badenoch had steered her party too far to the right to counter populism from Reform UK, and that Labour had done the same to respond to the electoral challenge of the Green Party.

== Organisation ==
Role	Namees	Term Start	Term End
Co-Chairs	Ruth Davidson	26 January 2026	Incumbent
Co-Chairs	Andy Street	26 January 2026	Incumbent
Vice Chairs	David Gauke	26 January 2026	Incumbent
Vice Chairs	Amber Rudd	26 January 2026	Incumbent
Wider Board	Gavin Barwell	26 January 2026	Incumbent
Wider Board	David Lidington	26 January 2026	Incumbent
Wider Board	Margot James	26 January 2026	Incumbent
Wider Board	Ahmed Ejaz	26 January 2026	Incumbent
Executive Director	Simon Saunders	26 January 2026	Incumbent

== List of supporters ==
List of supporters according to the website, with founders' names in bold:

Incumbent member of the House of Lords
Incumbent Police & Crime Commissioner

Image	Name	Notes
	The Lord Arbuthnot of Edrom	Life peer since 2015; Opposition Chief Whip in the House of Commons 1997–2001; MP for North East Hampshire 1997–2015; MP for Wanstead and Woodford 1987–1997
	Sir Tony Baldry	Minister of State for Agriculture, Fisheries and Food 1995–1997; MP for Banbury 1983–2015
	The Lord Barker of Battle	Life peer since 2015; MP for Bexhill & Battle 1997–2015
	**The Lord Barwell**	**Founder member of Prosper UK**; Life peer since 2019; Downing Street Chief of Staff 2017–19; MP for Croydon Central 2010–17
	Sir Peter Bottomley	Father of the House of Commons 2019–24; MP for Worthing West 1997–2024; MP for Eltham 1983–1997; MP for Woolwich West 1975–1983
	The Baroness Bottomley of Nettlestone	Life peer since 2005; Secretary of State for Health 1992–95; MP for South West Surrey 1984–2005
	The Lord Bourne of Aberystwyth	Life peer since 2013; Leader of the Welsh Conservative Party 1999–2011
	Steve Brine	Parliamentary Under-Secretary of State for Primary Care and Public Health 2017–2019; MP for Winchester 2010–24
	Sir Robert Buckland	Third Church Estates Commissioner since 2025; Lord Chancellor 2019–21; MP for South Swindon 2010–2024
	Elizabeth Campbell	Leader of Kensington & Chelsea Council
	Neil Carmichael	MP for Stroud 2010–17
	Alex Chalk	Lord Chancellor 2023–24; MP for Cheltenham 2015–24
	The Lord Clarke of Nottingham	Life peer since 2020; Father of the House of Commons 2017–19; Lord Chancellor 2010–12; Chancellor of the Exchequer 1993–97; MP for Rushcliffe 1970–2019
	Damian Collins	Parliamentary Under-Secretary of State for Tech and the Digital Economy 2022; MP for Folkestone & Hythe 2010–24
	**The Baroness Davidson of Lundin Links**	**Co-Chair of Prosper UK**; Life peer since 2021; Leader of the Scottish Conservative Party 2011–19
	Glyn Davies	MP for Montgomeryshire 2010–19; AM for Mid & West Wales 1999–2007
	Dame Jackie Doyle-Price	Parliamentary Under-Secretary of State for Mental Health, Inequalities and Suicide Prevention 2017–2019; Minister of State for Industry 2022; MP for Thurrock 2010–24
	Flick Drummond	MP for Meon Valley 2019–24; MP for Portsmouth South 2015–17
	Sir Alan Duncan	Minister of State for Europe & the Americas 2016–19; Minister of State for International Development 2010–14; MP for Rutland & Melton 1992–2019
	Philip Dunne	Minister of State for Health 2016–2018; MP for Ludlow 2005–24
	Jane Ellison	Financial Secretary to the Treasury 2016–17; MP for Battersea 2010–17
	Tobias Ellwood	Chair of the Defence Select Committee; MP for Bournemouth East 2005–24
	Vicky Ford	Minister of State for Development 2022; MP for Chelmsford 2017–24
	The Lord Garnier	Life peer since 2018; Solicitor General for England & Wales 2010–12; MP for Harborough 1992–2017
	**David Gauke**	**Vice-Chair of Prosper UK**; Lord Chancellor 2018–19; MP for South West Hertfordshire 2005–19
	Jo Gideon	MP for Stoke-on-Trent Central 2019–24
	Roger Gough	Leader of Kent County Council
	Richard Graham	MP for Gloucester 2010–24
	Damian Green	Chair of the One Nation Conservative Caucus 2019–24; First Secretary of State 2017; MP for Ashford 1997–2024
	Justine Greening	Secretary of State for International Development 2012–16; Secretary of State for Education 2016–2018; Minister for Women and Equalities 2016–2018; MP for Putney 2005–19
	The Lord Deben	Life peer since 2010; Chairman of the Conservative Party 1983–85; Secretary of State for the Environment 1993–1997
	The Lord Hammond of Runnymede	Life peer since 2020; Chancellor of the Exchequer 2016–19; Foreign Secretary 2014–2016; MP for Runnymede & Weybridge 1997–2019
	Stephen Hammond	Minister of State for Health 2018–2019; MP for Wimbledon 2005–24
	Matt Hancock	Secretary of State for Health & Social Care 2018–21; MP for West Suffolk 2010–24
	Greg Hands	Chairman of the Conservative Party 2023; Minister of State for Trade Policy 2023–24, 2022–23, 2020–21, 2016–18; MP for Chelsea & Fulham 2010–24; MP for Hammersmith & Fulham 2005–10
	Trudy Harrison	PPS to the Prime Minister 2019–21; Minister of State for Transport 2022; MP for Copeland 2017–24
	Charles Hendry	Minister of State for Energy & Climate Change 2010–12; MP for Wealden 2001–15, High Peak 1992-97
	The Lord Heseltine	Life peer since 2001; Deputy Prime Minister 1995–97; President of the Board of Trade 1992–1995; MP for Henley 1974–2001
	Roger Hirst	Essex Police, Fire & Crime Commissioner since 2016
	Sir George Hollingbery	Ambassador to Cuba 2022–25; Minister of State for Trade Policy 2018–19; MP for Meon Valley 2010–19
	Kris Hopkins	Minister of State for Northern Ireland 2016–17; Minister of State for Housing and Local Government 2013–14; MP for Keighley 2010–17
	Nick Hurd	Minister for Civil Society 2010–14; MP for Ruislip, Northwood & Pinner 2010–19; MP for Ruislip-Northwood 2005–10
	Michael Jack	Chairman of the Environment, Food & Rural Affairs Select Committee 2003–10; MP for Fylde 1987–2010
	Margot James	MP for Stourbridge 2010–19
	The Lord Kirkhope of Harrogate	Life peer since 2016; Leader of the Conservatives in the European Parliament 2004–07 and 2008–10; MEP for Yorkshire & the Humber 1999–2016
	The Lady Harrington of Watford	MP for Erewash 2010–15
	Sir Oliver Letwin	Minister of State for Government Policy 2010–16; Chancellor of the Duchy of Lancaster 2014–2016; MP for West Dorset 1997–2019
	Sir David Lidington	Leader of the House of Commons 2016–17; MP for Aylesbury 1992–2019
	Sir Peter Luff	MP for Mid Worcestershire 1997–2015
	Johnny Mercer	Minister of State for Veterans' Affairs 2019–2021, 2022, 2022–2024; MP for Plymouth Moor View 2015–24
	Sir Bob Neill	Chair of the Justice Select Committee 2015–24; Leader of the Conservative Party in the London Assembly 2004–06; MP for Bromley & Chislehurst 2006–24
	Guy Opperman	MP for Hexham 2010–24
	Claire Perry O’Neill	MP for Devizes 2010–19
	Rebecca Pow	MP for Taunton Deane 2015–24
	Mark Prisk	MP for Hertford & Stortford 2001–19
	The Lord Randall of Uxbridge	Life peer since 2018; Government Deputy Chief Whip in the House of Commons 2010–13; MP for Uxbridge & South Ruislip 2010–15; MP for Uxbridge 1997–2010
	Sir Malcolm Rifkind	Chair of the Intelligence & Security Committee 2010–15; MP for Kensington 2010–15; MP for Kensington & Chelsea 2005–10; MP for Edinburgh Pentlands 1974–97
	**Amber Rudd**	**Vice-Chair of Prosper UK**; Home Secretary 2016–18; MP for Hastings & Rye 2010–19
	Izzi Seccombe	Leader of Warwickshire County Council
	Mark Simmonds	MP for Boston & Skegness 2001–15
	The Lord Soames of Fletching	Life peer since 2022; MP for Mid Sussex 1997–2019; MP for Crawley 1983–97
	Dame Caroline Spelman	Secretary of State for Environment, Food & Rural Affairs 2010–12; Chairman of the Conservative Party 2007–09; MP for Meriden 1997–2019
	John Stevenson	MP for Carlisle 2010–24
	Iain Stewart	MP for Milton Keynes South 2010–24
	**Sir Andy Street**	**Co-Chair of Prosper UK**; Mayor of the West Midlands 2017–24
	Edward Timpson	MP for Eddisbury 2019–24; MP for Crewe & Nantwich 2008–17
	Lisa Townsend	Surrey Police & Crime Commissioner since 2021
	The Lord Tyrie	Chair of the Competition & Markets Authority 2018–20; Life peer since 2018; MP for Chichester 1997–2017
	The Lord Vaizey of Didcot	Life peer since 2020; MP for Wantage 2005–19
	The Lord Willetts	Life peer since 2015; MP for Havant 1992–2015
