= Richard Parker (mayor) =

British businessman and politician

Mayor Richard Parker
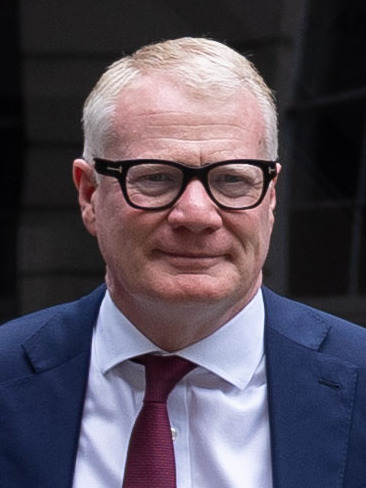
- Parker in 2024

Mayor of the West Midlands
- Incumbent
- Assumed office 6 May 2024
- Deputy: Sharon Thompson; Stephen Simkins
- Preceded by: Andy Street

Personal details
- Born: May 1963 (age 63) Bristol, England
- Party: Labour Co-op
- Profession: Accountant and businessman

Richard Parker (born c. May 1963) is a British businessman and Labour politician serving as the strategic authority mayor for the West Midlands since May 2024. He is a member of the Labour and Co-operative Party. He defeated Conservative incumbent Andy Street in the 2024 West Midlands mayoral election.

== Early life ==
Parker was born and raised in Bristol. He is the son of a docker father and a school secretary mother. He left school aged 16 to work at a local port authority. Parker returned to formal education a few years later, and earned a degree in economics.

== Business career ==
He is a qualified public finance accountant. In 1989 he joined Price Waterhouse (later PricewaterhouseCoopers) "PwC", rising to become a partner in 2006 and acting as the company's lead for housing and communities. He managed their relationship with the Labour Party for five years, from 2010 to 2015. Whilst at PwC, he led a team to advise on the establishment of the West Midlands Combined Authority, and the devolution settlement that this involved.

He left PwC in 2016, setting up his own management consultancy, RP Strategy, working with SMEs and initiatives including housing, green investment and the Birmingham Commonwealth Games.

In April 2024, The Times reported that in the year before he was selected as Labour mayoral candidate, Parker donated £12,000, and a week at his holiday home in Cornwall (valued at £1,400), to Shadow Chancellor Rachel Reeves. Parker also donated £5,000 to Shadow Health Secretary Wes Streeting.

== Political career ==
Parker was elected Mayor of the West Midlands in the 2024 election after a tight race, defeating Andy Street by 1,508 votes.

During the campaign, West Midlands Police confirmed that it was assessing allegations by Gary Sambrook, a Conservative MP, that Parker may have breached electoral law as his home address was outside the West Midlands Combined Authority boundary. Parker commented that he had "a base in Birmingham that I’ve been using to fulfil my campaign." It was then confirmed by West Midlands Police that the allegations were unfounded, and that there was “no criminal offence to investigate”.

In August 2026, he announced plans to bring the region’s main bus operation into public control.

== Personal life ==
Parker has a home in Barnt Green, Bromsgrove, Worcestershire, a holiday home in Cornwall, and rents a flat in the city centre of Birmingham. He is married to a solicitor, and has a son who attended a school in Birmingham and works in manufacturing in the Black Country. Parker has lived in the West Midlands region since 1985.

He is a supporter of Bristol City F.C., and has been a member of the Labour Party for 35 years.
