= Andy Street =

British politician (born 1963)

Sir Andy Street CBE
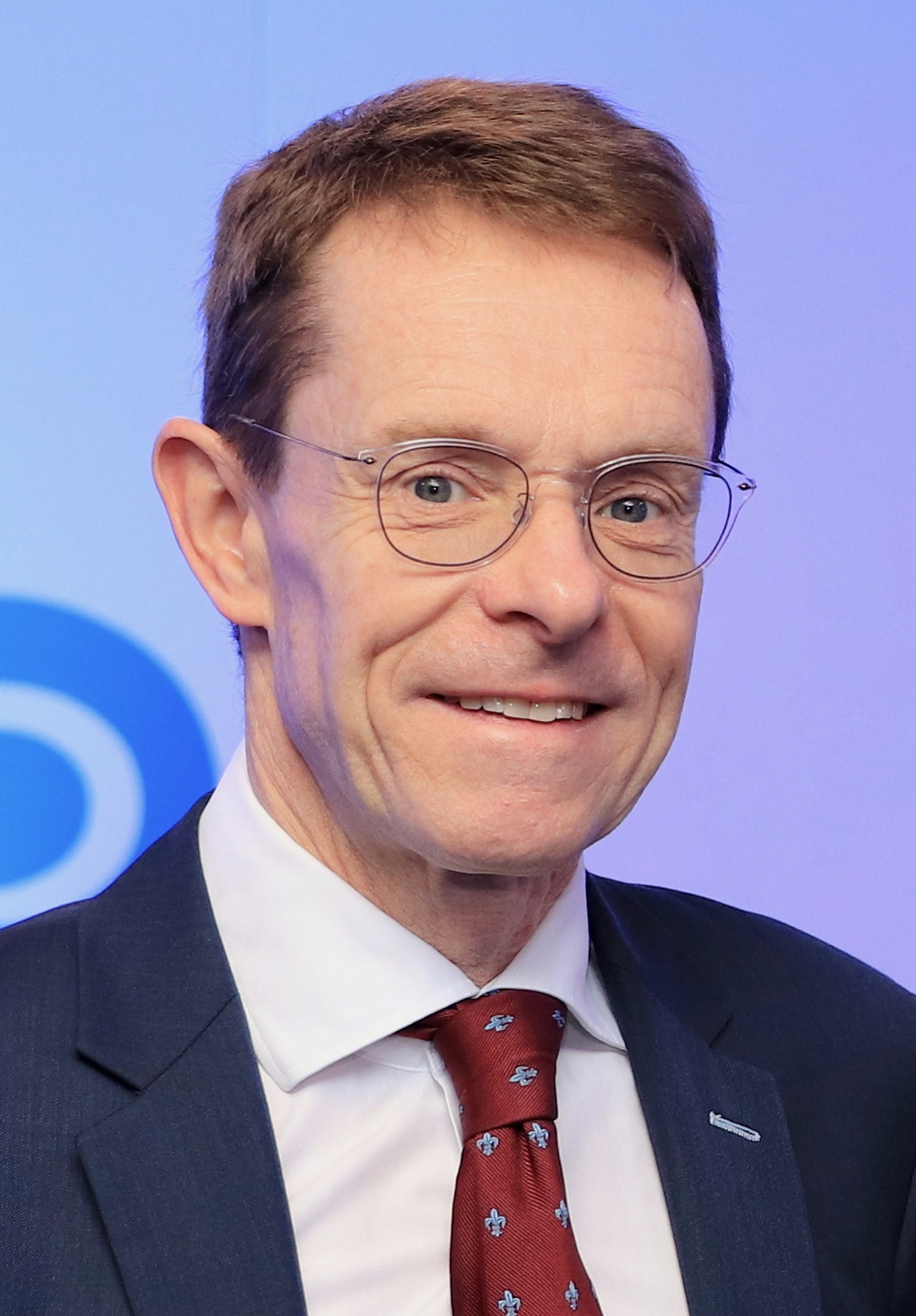
- Street in 2018

Mayor of the West Midlands
- In office 8 May 2017 – 5 May 2024
- Deputy: Bob Sleigh
- Preceded by: Office established
- Succeeded by: Richard Parker

Co-Chair of Prosper UK
- Incumbent
- Assumed office January 2026 Serving with Ruth Davidson
- Vice chairs: Amber Rudd; David Gauke
- Preceded by: Position established

Personal details
- Born: Andrew John Street; 11 June 1963 (age 63) Banbury, Oxfordshire, England
- Party: Conservative
- Domestic partner: Michael Fabricant (1990–present)
- Education: King Edward's School
- Alma mater: Keble College, Oxford
- Occupation: Politician; businessman

Sir Andrew John Street CBE (born 11 June 1963) is a British businessman and Conservative Party politician who was the managing director of John Lewis & Partners from 2007 to 2016 and Mayor of the West Midlands from 2017 to 2024. He was Britain's first openly gay directly elected metro mayor. Street won the May 2017 mayoral election, narrowly defeating Labour candidate Siôn Simon with 50.4% of the vote in the second round. He was re-elected in 2021 with an increased majority, defeating Labour candidate Liam Byrne. He sought a third term in 2024 but was narrowly defeated by Labour candidate Richard Parker.

== Early life ==
Born in Banbury, Oxfordshire, Street moved to Birmingham with his parents, both scientists, when he was ten months old, growing up in Northfield and Solihull. He attended Green Meadow Infants School, Langley Junior School and was then privately educated at King Edward's School in Edgbaston. He studied Philosophy, Politics and Economics (PPE) at Keble College, Oxford, where he was President of the Oxford University Conservative Association in the Trinity term of 1984.

== Business career ==
After graduating, Street harboured ambitions to be a social worker, but he was turned down by Birmingham City Council. He was also turned down for the Marks & Spencer training scheme. Street thus started his career at the John Lewis Partnership in 1985 as a trainee at Brent Cross.

After roles in department stores, head office and manufacturing units, Street became managing director of John Lewis Milton Keynes in 1993, moving to the same role at Bluewater five years later. In 2000 he became supply chain director and then, two years later, director of personnel. He became managing director in 2007 and, during his tenure at the top, oversaw a 50% increase in gross sales to over £4.4 billion, a doubling in the number of stores and the growth of the company's online sales department, in spite of the Great Recession.

During his John Lewis directorship, Street also worked in local economic development, being named Chairman of the Greater Birmingham and Solihull Local Enterprise Partnership in April 2011. The announcement of his appointment came weeks after the news that John Lewis would open a flagship store in the newly developed Grand Central shopping centre above New Street station. In 2015, he became lead non-executive director for the Department for Communities and Local Government as well as a member of Prime Minister David Cameron's Business Advisory Group. Street stepped down from these roles in September 2016 after announcing his intention to run for Mayor of the West Midlands.

== Political career ==
=== Mayor of the West Midlands (2017–2024) ===
==== Mayoral election: 2016–2017 ====
On 29 September 2016, Street was officially selected by Conservatives to stand in the first election for Mayor of the West Midlands Combined Authority (WMCA), which took place on 4 May 2017. Street said: "[The Combined Authority] will determine how we create wealth here and what type of society the West Midlands will become. (...) Our economy is being renewed but we have much more to do to ensure everybody feels the benefit. Our mission is therefore to build the economic powerhouse of Britain in an inclusive way. That will need leadership from somebody who has a proven record, can bring people together and can represent us with passion. This election needs to go beyond traditional political loyalties and I look forward to seeking voters' support for the job ahead." The following day, it was confirmed that Street would leave John Lewis at the end of October 2016. He was succeeded by Paula Nickolds, who assumed the role in January 2017.

For too long, Labour has taken voters [in the West Midlands] for granted. We can win here, we will win here. We really can do it, and so that's why I'm going to leave a job I love, to lead the place I love. This is a campaign that is moderate, inclusive and tolerant, and is made in the West Midlands.

— From Street's speech to Conservative Party conference 2016

In a speech at the 2016 Conservative Party conference, Street declared his support for Birmingham's bid to host the 2026 Commonwealth Games. He also announced that he would seek to address the "imbalance" in transportation spending that sees London receive seven times as much spending on transport infrastructure per head as the West Midlands does, seeking to end the "begging bowl culture" of applying for regional funding. Street said that fighting inequality would also be a priority, as "social challenges can only be met when everybody shares the fruits of economic progress", saying that he would draw on the lessons of Joseph Chamberlain and his own experiences with the John Lewis Partnership, which shares profits with all of its employees. He also called for a series of debates with Labour candidate Siôn Simon and Liberal Democrat candidate Beverley Nielsen.

Street was endorsed by The Lord Jones of Birmingham, a businessman and crossbench peer who formerly served as Minister of State for Trade and Investment under Gordon Brown.

Street was elected Mayor of the West Midlands on 4 May 2017 with 238,628 votes (216,280 first preferences, and 22,348 transfers) in the second round of voting, and in October of the same year was placed 82nd on commentator Iain Dale's list of 'The Top 100 Most Influential People on the Right'. Upon taking office, he became entitled to the style of Mayor.

==== First term: 2017–2021 ====
Street lobbied the government to integrate the Police and Crime Commissioner (PCC) role within the mayoral position in time for the 2020 election, later postponed until 2021 due to the COVID-19 pandemic. This would have put the role's powers on policing in line with both the mayors of London and Greater Manchester. However, this broke down as the Combined Authority struggled with Street's lack of transparency. A public consultation ran in 2019 saw over 6,000 respondents and 58% supported the integration of the PCC role into the metro mayor. However, concern was expressed that local Conservative groups had encouraged people to fill in multiple responses. In June 2020, Street signed a plan to create a West Midlands National Park, in cooperation with councils in and around the city-region. In February 2021, the WMCA and mayor agreed on a budget and digital strategy for the project. That same month, a five year plan for decarbonising industry in the West Midlands was drafted for the WMCA.

==== Second term: 2021–2024 ====
Street was re-elected as Mayor on 6 May 2021 with 314,669 votes, 54% of the total votes cast after second preference votes were included.

Street has said that he wants Birmingham to host the 2027 Invictus Games.

===== Conservative Party Conference 2023 =====
At the 2023 Conservative Party Conference, Street held a press conference on the future of the proposed Phase 2 of High Speed 2, which would have connected Manchester and Birmingham New Street. He warned that the rumoured decision to scrap the railway line would be missing "a once in a lifetime opportunity to level up", and damage the UK's international reputation for investors. He called for the Government to attract further private investment, rather than cancel the second phase.

Following this, it was reported that Street was considering resigning in protest to the policy, with a spokesman saying that Street would "respond accordingly" to the policy's announcement.

When Prime Minister Rishi Sunak announced in his conference speech that Phase 2 of HS2 would be cancelled, with its capital spend redistributed into transport projects across the regions, he said:

I say this to Andy Street, a man I have huge admiration and respect for, I know we have different views on HS2. But I also know we can work together to ensure a faster, stronger spine: quicker trains and more capacity between Birmingham and Manchester.

Following Sunak's speech, Street said he was "disappointed" but that he had decided not to resign. Street later outlined plans with the Mayor of Greater Manchester Andy Burnham to revive the high-speed rail project with private investment.

==== 2024 re-election campaign ====
Street stood to be elected to a third term in the 2024 mayoral election. Prior to the election, the Labour-run Birmingham City Council, the local council for the most populous metropolitan borough within West Midlands, declared bankruptcy. The situation was criticised during the campaign by Street, who said that the Council had "let down" citizens and services. However, he also distanced himself from the incumbent Conservative government led by Prime Minister Sunak, urging the voters "focus on him and his record, not the performance of the Conservative party nationally". Street has also highlighted his record in office, saying that "an extra £10 billion pounds has come to the area as a result of the mayoral system" and that his mayoralty has "delivered 16,000 more houses a year, 33% of them affordable" which according to him is "one of the best records of any region".

Amongst his other policies, Street pledged to treble the amount of social housing within the West Midlands to 1,700 new social homes per year, using powers newly devolved to the combined authority in 2023, with the city region receiving a single affordable housing settlement from central government after 2026.

Street backed the proposed light rail system in Coventry, with Street saying that he has "ring-fenced £72m in government money" for the system.

The role of the PCC was set to be abolished and its functions transferred to the Mayor in time for the next mayoral term following the election, however the incumbent Labour PCC Simon Foster took legal action against the process and the High Court ruled in his favour, preventing the scheduled merger of the roles prior to the election. Street continued to support the merger of the functions to the mayoral powers, saying that the success of the model was "already evident" in city regions in which the mayor already holds PCC responsibilities.

Street was defeated in the election after a tight race, losing to Richard Parker by 1,508 votes.

In May 2024, Street announced that he would not be standing to become a member of Parliament in the upcoming general election.

=== Political views ===
Street has been an outspoken critic of continually-rising business rates, arguing that "property is the way retailers have made money historically and we need a system that is a reflection of the future", though he does not believe that online transaction taxes are the answer.

In the July–September 2022 Conservative Party leadership election, Street initially endorsed Jeremy Hunt, but after he withdrew, supported Liz Truss. After Truss announced her resignation as Prime Minister in October 2022, Street stated that he did not regret supporting her candidacy for Conservative Party leader.

In the 2024 Conservative Party leadership election, Street endorsed Tom Tugendhat.

Street was announced as Chair of the Birmingham Repertory Theatre Board of Trustees in October 2024.

Street has served as President of the Birmingham Ladywood Conservative Association since 2025.

In January 2026, Street alongside Amber Rudd, David Gauke and Ruth Davidson launched a movement called Prosper UK, aiming to bring the Conservative party back to the centre-right.

== Honours ==
Street was appointed a Commander of the Order of the British Empire (CBE) by Queen Elizabeth II in the 2015 Birthday Honours for services to economic growth. He was named the 'Most Admired Leader' of the year by business magazine Management Today in 2014. He received the 'President's award' from the Greater Birmingham Chambers of Commerce in for his services to the region. He holds honorary degrees from Birmingham City University, the University of Birmingham and Aston University. Street was knighted by King Charles III in the 2025 New Year Honours for public service.

== Personal life ==
Street is gay and is life partner of former Conservative MP Michael Fabricant.

For more than 20 years from his school days, Street was involved with the charity Birmingham Young Volunteers (BYV) Adventure Camps, taking underprivileged children nominated by Birmingham Social Services to Wales for adventure camps. Street is a supporter of Aston Villa F.C. and runs half-marathons. He is Vice-Chairman of Performances Birmingham Limited, which is responsible for running the city's Symphony and Town Halls.
