= Solihull Metropolitan Borough Council =

Local government body in Solihull, England

Type
- Type: Metropolitan borough council

History
- Founded: 1 April 1974

Leadership
- Mayor: Sardul Marwa, Conservative since 26 May 2026
- Leader: Karen Grinsell, Conservative since 13 May 2025
- Chief Executive: Paul Johnson since July 2023

Structure
- Seats: 51 councillors
- Graph of the party split among 51 seats.
- Political groups: Administration (25) Conservative (25) Other parties (23) Reform (13) Liberal Democrats (6) Green (4) Vacancies (3) Vacant (3)

Elections
- Voting system: First-past-the-post
- Last election: 7 May 2026
- Next election: 6 May 2027

Motto
- Urbs in Rure

Meeting place
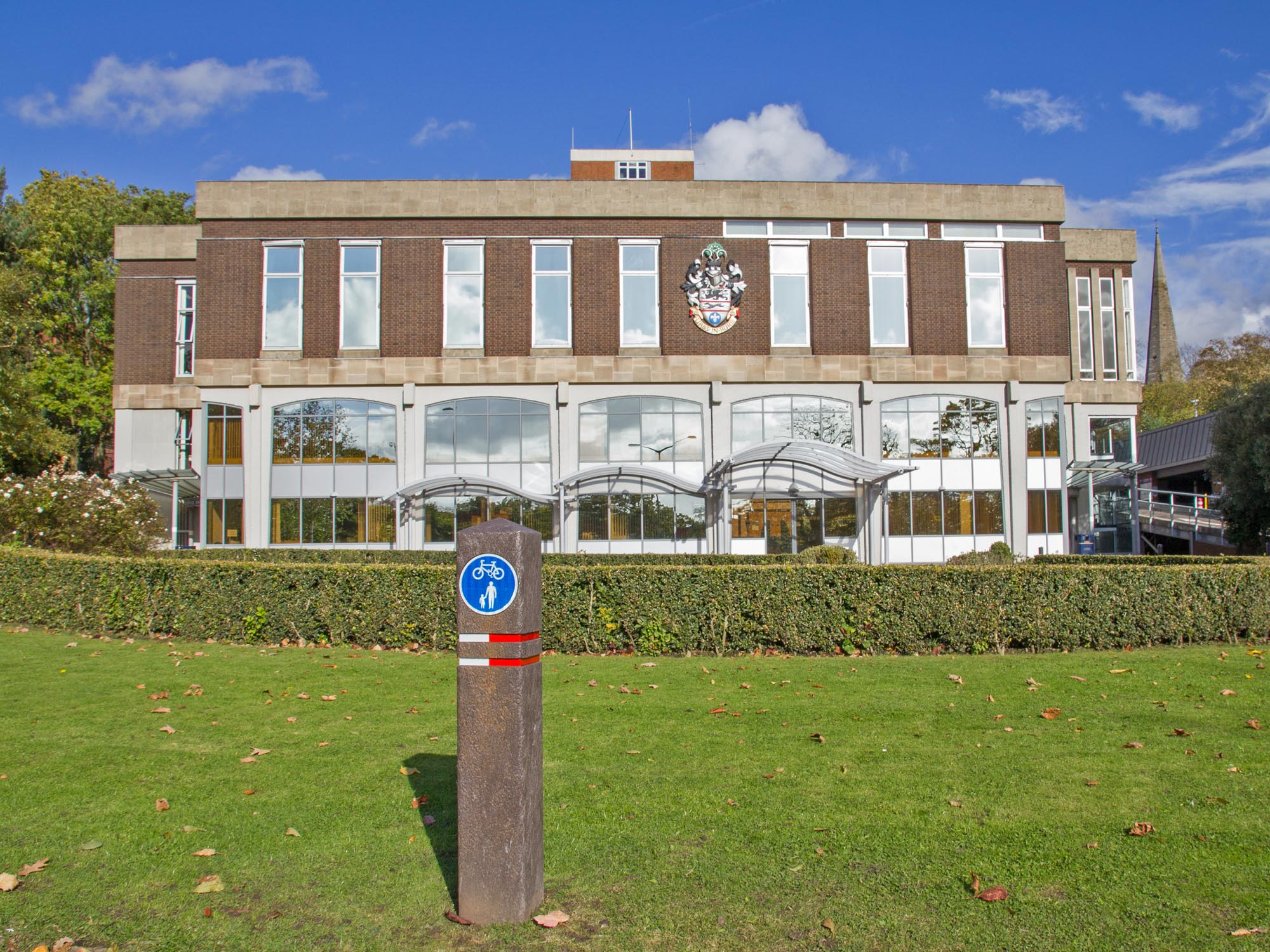
- Council House, Manor Square, Solihull, B91 3QB

Website
- solihull.gov.uk

Solihull Metropolitan Borough Council, also known as Solihull Council, is the local authority for the Metropolitan Borough of Solihull in the West Midlands, England. It is a metropolitan borough council and provides the majority of local government services in the borough. The council has been a member of the West Midlands Combined Authority since 2016.

The council went under no overall control at the 2026 election, since when it has been run by a Conservative minority administration. It is based at the Council House on Manor Square in Solihull.

== History ==
Until 1932, the town of Solihull was administered as a rural parish with a parish council subordinate to the larger Solihull Rural District Council. As Solihull rapidly developed in the twentieth century, it was promoted to higher statuses within the administrative hierarchy, becoming an urban district in 1932, then a municipal borough in 1954, and then a county borough in 1964, taking over county-level functions from Warwickshire County Council.

The modern metropolitan borough and its council were established in 1974 under the Local Government Act 1972, as one of seven boroughs in the new metropolitan county of the West Midlands. The new borough covered the combined area of the old county borough of Solihull plus ten parishes from the Meriden Rural District and one parish (Hockley Heath) from the Stratford-on-Avon Rural District. The enlarged district was named Solihull, and the borough status previously held by the county borough passed to the new district on its creation, allowing the chair of the council to take the title of mayor, continuing Solihull's series of mayors dating back to its first incorporation as a borough in 1954.

From 1974 until 1986 the council was a lower-tier authority, with upper-tier functions provided by the West Midlands County Council. The county council was abolished in 1986 and its functions passed to the county's seven borough councils, including Solihull, with some services provided through joint committees.

Since 2016 the council has been a member of the West Midlands Combined Authority, which has been led by the directly elected Mayor of the West Midlands since 2017. The combined authority provides strategic leadership and co-ordination for certain functions across the county, but Solihull Council continues to be responsible for most local government functions.

== Governance ==
Solihull Council provides metropolitan borough services. Some strategic functions in the area are provided by the West Midlands Combined Authority; the leader and deputy leader of the council sit on the board of the combined authority as Solihull's representatives. Parts of the borough are covered by civil parishes, which form an additional tier of local government for their areas.

=== Political control ===
The council went under no overall control at the 2026 election, having previously been under Conservative majority control since 2011. The Conservatives remain the largest party on the council and formed a minority administration after the 2026 election due to the 3 byelections being called it has gone back to conservative majority control due to 3 reform seats being empty.

Political control of the council since the 1974 reforms took effect has been as follows:

Party in control	Years
Conservative	1974–1991
No overall control	1991–2000
Conservative	2000–2007
No overall control	2007–2008
Conservative	2008–2010
No overall control	2010–2011
Conservative	2011–2026
No overall control	May 2026– October 2026
Conservative	October 2026-Present

=== Leadership ===
The role of mayor is largely ceremonial in Solihull. Political leadership is instead provided by the leader of the council. The leaders since 1974 have been:

Councillor	Party	From	To
David Wynne Rees	Conservative	1 Apr 1974	May 1982
Bob Meacham	Conservative	May 1982	17 Oct 1990
Fraser Mitchell	Conservative	17 Oct 1990	17 May 1993
Ken Meeson	Conservative	17 May 1993	May 1996
Mick Corser	Labour	13 May 1996	May 1999
Ted Richards	Conservative	17 May 1999	May 2007
Ken Meeson	Conservative	15 May 2007	May 2010
Ian Hedley	Liberal Democrats	25 May 2010	24 May 2011
Ken Meeson	Conservative	24 May 2011	10 Jun 2014
Bob Sleigh	Conservative	10 Jun 2014	2 May 2019
Ian Courts	Conservative	14 May 2019	13 May 2025
Karen Grinsell	Conservative	13 May 2025	

=== Composition ===
Following the 2026 election and subsequent changes to July 2026, the composition of the council was:

Party	Seats
Conservative	25
Reform	16
Green	4
Liberal Democrats	6
Total	51

The next election is due in May 2027.

== Elections ==
Since the last boundary changes in 2004, the council has comprised 51 councillors representing 17 wards, with each ward electing three councillors. Elections are held three years out of every four, with a third of the council (one councillor for each ward) elected each time for a four-year term of office.

== Premises ==
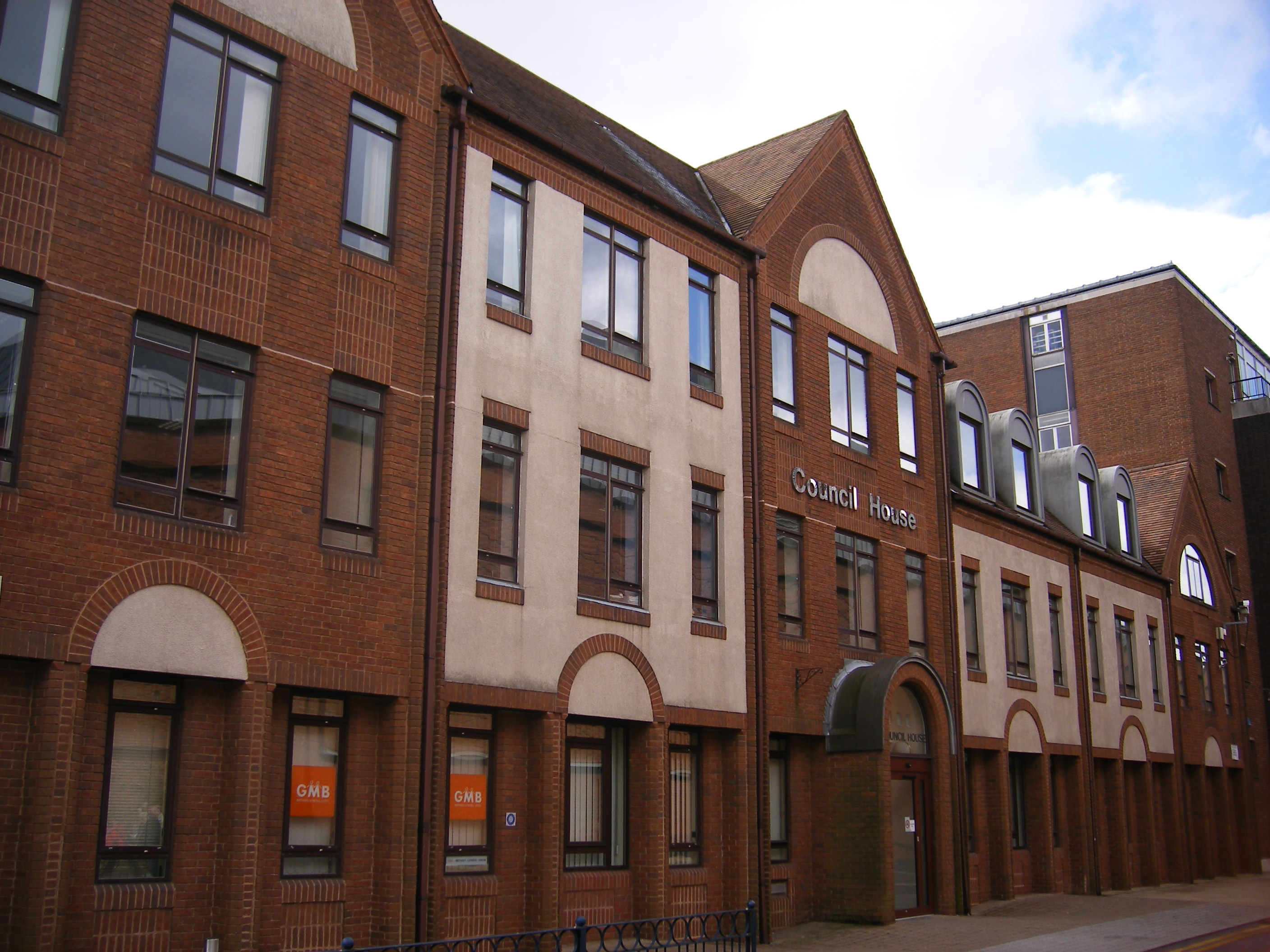
Solihull Council House

The council is based at the Council House on Manor Square in the centre of Solihull and adjoining buildings, notably including Church Hill House and the Civic Suite. The latter includes the council chamber and forms part of the same building as the town's register office. Church Hill House was completed in 1967 and the Civic Suite followed in 1968, both being purpose-built for the old borough council. The Council House (originally called Orchard House) was subsequently built in front of Church Hill House, opening in 1989.
