= Liam Byrne =

British Labour Party politician (born 1970)

The Right Honourable Liam Byrne MP
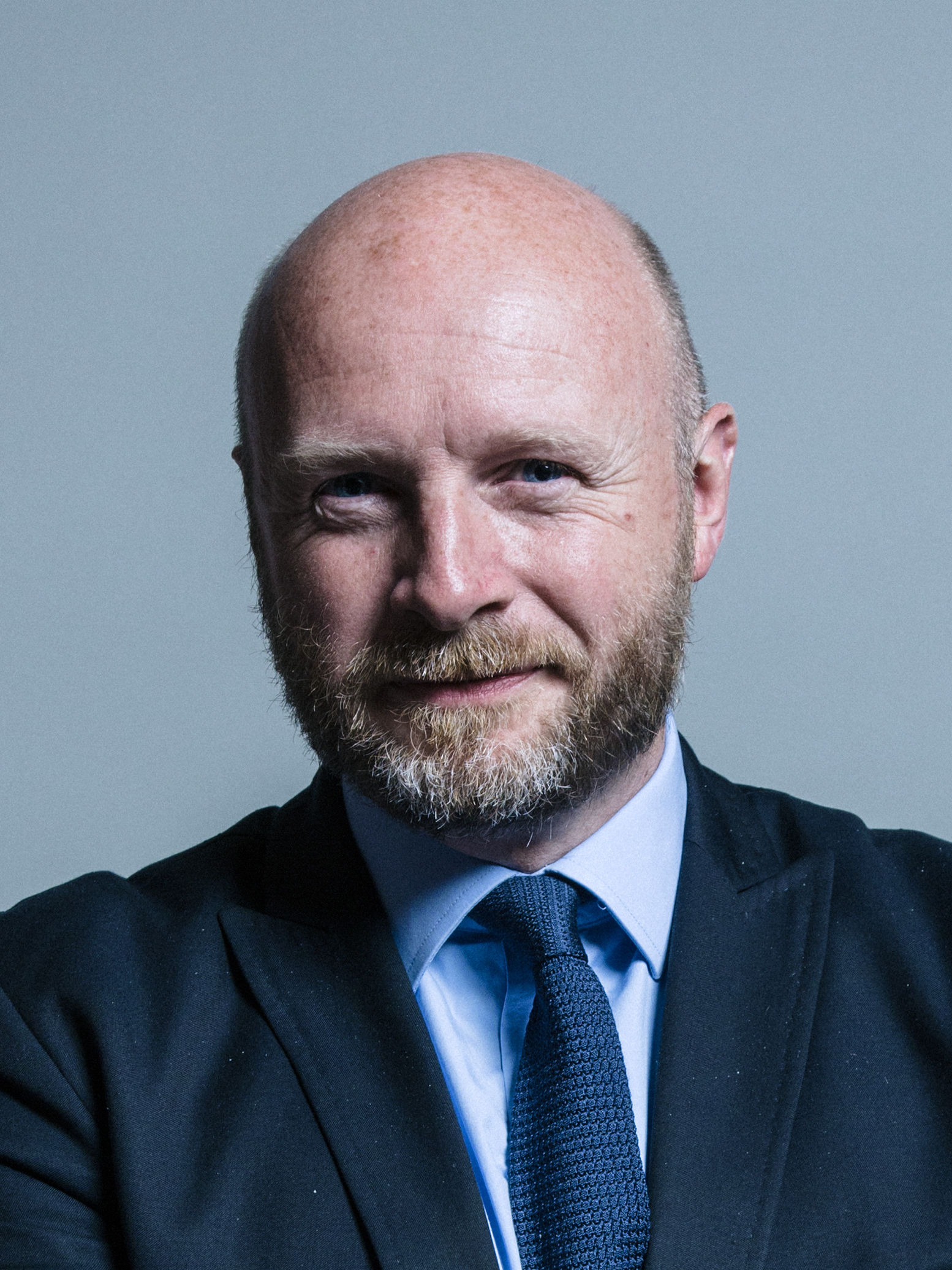
- Official portrait, 2017

Chair of the Business and Trade Committee
- Incumbent
- Assumed office 18 October 2023
- Preceded by: Darren Jones

Chief Secretary to the Treasury
- In office 5 June 2009 – 11 May 2010
- Prime Minister: Gordon Brown
- Chancellor: Alistair Darling
- Preceded by: Yvette Cooper
- Succeeded by: David Laws

Minister for the Cabinet Office Chancellor of the Duchy of Lancaster
- In office 3 October 2008 – 5 June 2009
- Prime Minister: Gordon Brown
- Preceded by: Ed Miliband
- Succeeded by: Tessa Jowell (Cabinet Office); The Baroness Royall of Blaisdon (Duchy of Lancaster)
Junior ministerial offices
Minister of State
2007–2008	West Midlands
2006–2008	Borders and Immigration
2006–2006	Police and Counter-Terrorism
Under-Secretary of State
2005–2006	Care Services
Shadow portfolios
Shadow Cabinet
2011–2013	Work and Pensions
2010–2011	Cabinet Office
2010–2010	Chief Treasury Secretary
Shadow Frontbench
2017–2020	Digital
2013–2015	Higher Education

Member of Parliament for Birmingham Hodge Hill and Solihull North Birmingham Hodge Hill (2004–2024)
- Incumbent
- Assumed office 15 July 2004
- Preceded by: Terry Davis
- Majority: 1,566 (4.6%)

Personal details
- Born: Liam Dominic Byrne; 2 October 1970 (age 56) Warrington, Lancashire, England
- Party: Labour
- Spouse: Sarah Harnett (m. 1998)
- Children: 3
- Education: University of Manchester (BA); Harvard University (MBA)
- Website: liambyrne.co.uk

Liam Dominic Byrne (born 2 October 1970) is a British Labour Party politician who has been the Member of Parliament for Birmingham Hodge Hill and Solihull North, previously Birmingham Hodge Hill, since 2004. He served in Prime Minister Gordon Brown's Cabinet from 2008 to 2010.

Byrne served in the Home Office under Prime Minister Tony Blair as Minister for Police and Counter-terrorism (2006) and Minister for Borders and Immigration (2006–08). He served in Gordon Brown's Cabinet as Minister for the Cabinet Office and Chancellor of the Duchy of Lancaster from 2008 to 2009. He deputised for Chancellor Alistair Darling at HM Treasury as Chief Secretary to the Treasury from 2009 to 2010. Upon his departure as Chief Secretary to the Treasury, he notoriously left a note for his successor which read "I'm afraid there is no money".

In Opposition, he attended Ed Miliband's Shadow Cabinet as Shadow Chief Secretary to the Treasury (2010), then Shadow Minister for the Cabinet Office (2010–11) and Shadow Secretary of State for Work and Pensions (2011–13). Following his demotion in 2013, Byrne continued to serve in junior Shadow Ministerial roles under Miliband and later Jeremy Corbyn.

Byrne was the Labour candidate for Mayor of the West Midlands in 2021, losing to the previous Conservative mayor Andy Street. He is now the chair of the House of Commons Business and Trade Select Committee.

== Early life and career ==
Liam Byrne was born on 2 October 1970 in Warrington. His father was a science teacher while his mother was a district council officer. He was state-educated at Burnt Mill School in Harlow, before completing his A-levels at the Hertfordshire and Essex High School in Bishop's Stortford. He studied History and Politics at the University of Manchester, graduating with a first, and whilst at university was elected Communications Officer of the University of Manchester Students' Union. Byrne was then a Fulbright Scholar at Harvard Business School, taking an MBA with honours from Harvard University.

Prior to his election to Parliament, he worked for Accenture and Rothschild & Co, before co-founding a venture-backed technology company, e-Government Solutions Group, in 2000. In 1996/97, he advised the Labour Party on the re-organisation of its Millbank headquarters, and helped lead Labour's business campaign.

He is a member of the Fabian Society's executive committee.

== Parliamentary career ==
=== 1st term (2004–2005) ===
Byrne was selected to contest the Birmingham Hodge Hill by-election following the resignation of the veteran Labour MP Terry Davis to become the Secretary-General of the Council of Europe. At the by-election, Byrne was elected to Parliament as MP for Birmingham Hodge Hill with 36.5% of the vote and a majority of 460. The campaign, led by MP Tom Watson, drew criticism from antiracists for its tactics, particularly a Labour leaflet proclaiming "Labour is on your side – the Lib Dems are on the side of failed asylum seekers". Byrne himself said, "I know that people here are worried about fraudulent asylum claims and illegal immigration. Yet the Lib Dems ignore what people say. They ignore what local people really want. The Lib Dems want to keep giving welfare benefits to failed asylum seekers. They voted for this in Parliament on 1 March 2004. They want your money – and mine – to go to failed asylum seekers".

Upon election, Byrne made his maiden speech on 22 July 2004 in which he condemned racial hatred.

=== 2nd term (2005–2010) ===
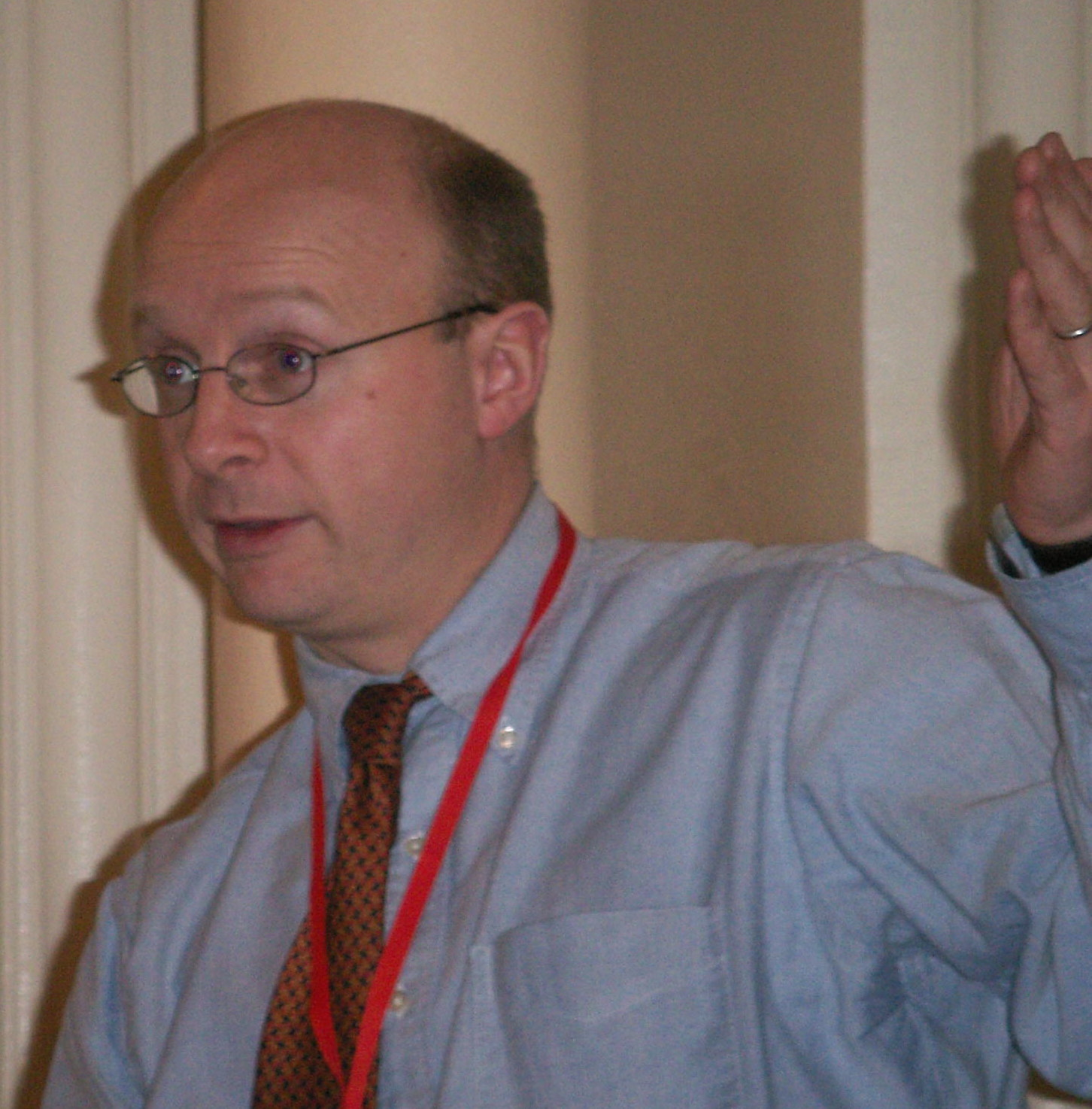
Byrne at the 2006 Labour Party Conference

At the 2005 general election, Byrne was re-elected as MP for Birmingham Hodge Hill with an increased vote share of 48.6% and an increased majority of 5,449. Following the election, Byrne was appointed Parliamentary under-secretary of state for Care Services at the Department of Health led by Secretary of State Patricia Hewitt.

A vocal campaigner for Road Safety, Byrne handed a petition in to Parliament in 2005 demanding tougher punishments for dangerous drivers. He sat on the parliamentary committee that shaped the Road Safety Act 2006, which increased fixed penalty fines for driving while using a mobile. In November 2007, he was fined £100 and received three points on his driving licence for using his mobile phone while driving.

Following the 2006 local elections, he was promoted in place of Hazel Blears as Minister of State for Policing and Counter-terrorism at the Home Office. However, just a fortnight later Home Secretary John Reid transferred him to the Immigration role, switching portfolios with Tony McNulty. Byrne's move was seen as an attempt by Reid to reorganise a dysfunctional immigrations system which Byrne completed, as well as establishing UK Border Agency, introduced a points system and developed the idea of earned citizenship. During this period he was also Minister for the West Midlands.

In November 2006, Byrne was responsible for a change to Immigration Rules preventing migrants who had entered under Britain's Highly Skilled Migrant Programme (HSMP) having permission to remain in Britain extended, unless they could show both that they had been earning at least £32,000 pa while in Britain and also that they had a good knowledge of English. This change was controversial because it applied retrospectively to immigrants who had entered Britain under the old rules, meaning the British Government had "moved the goalposts"–a degree became effectively an essential requirement, regardless of the skills or economic contribution that an individual could demonstrate.

In its report into the changes, the Parliamentary Joint Committee on Human Rights said that "The changes to the Rules are so clearly incompatible with Article 8, and so contrary to basic notions of fairness, that the case for immediately revisiting the changes to the Rules in Parliament is in our view overwhelming". Appeal cases have been won on appeal on the grounds that applicants had a legitimate expectation that the rules would not change to their detriment. A judicial review was successfully brought against the Government, with their actions when applying the new HSMP rules to those HSMP holders already in Britain as at 7 November 2006 being ruled as unlawful.

In May 2007, Byrne announced a consultation document which he said was about "trying to create a much more hostile environment in this country if you are here illegally". This eventually led to the controversial Conservative Home Office hostile environment policy. Byrne was promoted in a Cabinet reshuffle on 3 October 2008, becoming Minister for the Cabinet Office and Chancellor of the Duchy of Lancaster.

In June 2008, Byrne suggested the "August bank holiday" be made a weekend of national celebration in a speech to a New Labour think tank. Scotland's August bank holiday being held on a different date from that in Wales and England, he later retracted his suggestion – after pressure from the Scottish National Party – saying he was merely trying to "get the debate started".

In November 2008, an 11-page memo written by Byrne entitled "Working With Liam Byrne" was leaked to the press. In the memo, Byrne listed his demands from his staff, memorably including his requirement for a cappuccino on his arrival in the office, soup between 12:30 pm and 1 pm and an espresso at 3 pm. Byrne also instructed officials to tell him "not what you think I should know, but you expect I will get asked". He warns staff that they should "Never put anything to me unless you understand it and can explain it to me in 60 seconds... If I see things that are not of acceptable quality, I will blame you". The Guardian described Byrne as an "eager diva".

On leaving his position as Chief Secretary to the Treasury following the change of British Government in May 2010, Byrne left a note to his successor David Laws saying: "Dear Chief Secretary, I'm afraid there is no money. Kind regards – and good luck! Liam". Byrne later claimed that it was just typical humour between politicians but regretted it since the new government used it to justify the wave of cuts that were introduced. The note echoed Chancellor Reginald Maudling's note to James Callaghan: "Good luck, old cock ... Sorry to leave it in such a mess" after the Conservatives' defeat at the 1964 election. This note was frequently referenced by the following coalition government of Conservatives and Liberal Democrats to criticise the financial record of the previous Labour Government, and used as a visual prop by David Cameron in the Question Time debate preceding the 2015 general election. Following the party's election defeat, Byrne stated he had been "burnt with shame" since 2010 over the note which had harmed the 2015 election campaign.

=== 3rd term (2010–2015) ===
At the 2010 general election, Byrne was again re-elected with an increased vote share of 52% and an increased majority of 10,302. Following the election, Byrne was appointed by Ed Miliband to lead Labour's policy review for two years.

He was Shadow Secretary of State for Work and Pensions from January 2011 to October 2013. Byrne was sacked after increasing criticism from Labour members and having "badly lost the confidence of the PLP", particularly after allegedly describing the Conservative-led coalition's benefits cap as "too soft", saying that "Ministers have bodged the rules so the cap won't affect Britain's 4,000 largest families and it does nothing to stop people living a life on welfare".

He is the Chairman of the APPG on Inclusive Growth, formed in July 2014 upon the request of the Archbishop of Canterbury, with the aim of finding a new consensus on inclusive growth to ensure the benefits of growth are enjoyed by all sectors of society.

=== 4th term (2015–2017) ===
Byrne was again re-elected at the 2015 general election with an increased vote share of 68.4% and an increased majority of 23,362.

He supported Owen Smith in the 2016 Labour Party leadership election.

=== 5th term (2017–2019) ===
Byrne was again re-elected at the snap 2017 general election with an increased vote share of 81.1% and an increased majority of 31,026.

Byrne is a member of the Labour Friends of Israel and of Labour Friends of Palestine and the Middle East.

=== 6th term (2019–2024) ===
He was again re-elected at the 2019 general election, with a decreased vote share of 78.7% and a decreased majority of 28,655.

In April 2022, Byrne was found to have bullied a staff member; he was suspended from the House of Commons for two days after a 22-month investigation. The investigation began when a complaint was lodged with the Independent Complaints and Grievance Scheme (ICGS); the Independent Expert Panel found that Byrne ostracised a former assistant, David Barker, after a minor office dispute, specifically ignoring Barker for three months, including when Barker alerted Byrne as having COVID-19. Kathryn Stone, the Parliamentary Standards Commissioner, decreed Byrne's behaviour as being a "significant misuse of power"; and also found Byrne's decision to disable Barker's access to his parliamentary IT account as having a "punitive" effect, stating that this was "disproportionate and amounted to malicious behaviour". Following the publication of the ICGS report, Byrne apologised stating that he was "profoundly sorry".

In May 2023, Byrne was found to have misused public expenses. Byrne denied wrongdoing, but the Independent Parliamentary Standards Authority (IPSA) found there was "overwhelming evidence" that a member of Byrne's staff had worked on his failed mayoral election campaign during office hours, conservatively estimating that at least around 1,000 hours of publicly-funded time had been spent on the campaign. MPs may not use taxpayer-funded allowances for political campaigns; Byrne was not asked to repay the funds because the total hours worked by the staff member could not be established with some evidence in the report suggesting the hours could be in the thousands. Byrne stated subsequently he accepted the findings but refused to apologise.

=== 7th term (2024–) ===
Due to the 2023 review of Westminster constituencies, Byrne's constituency of Birmingham Hodge Hill was abolished, and replaced with Birmingham Hodge Hill and Solihull North. Byrne was elected to Parliament as MP for Birmingham Hodge Hill and Solihull North at the 2024 general election with 31.2% of the vote and a majority of 1,566. On the Chancellor Address to the Kings Speech Byrne called on the Reeves to encourage further measures including promotion of business the help civic society, review of all investments and shares held by the government

=== Mayoral candidate for the West Midlands ===
In February 2020, Byrne was selected as the Labour candidate for the 2021 West Midlands mayoral election. He came second with 46% of the vote behind the Conservative candidate Andy Street.

In his campaign he called for the Birmingham 2022 Commonwealth Games to be the "greenest games ever", and pledged to be the first West Midlands Mayor to fill the role of Deputy Mayor with a woman and to revitalise the West Midlands' ailing car industry by positioning it at the heart of British electric vehicle manufacturing. His official campaign slogan was 'A new future for the heart of Britain', although he said that his unofficial slogan was 'let's just get shit done'.

== Personal life ==
Byrne married Sarah Harnett in 1998; the couple have three children. In 2026, Byrne's book Why Populists Are Winning and How to Beat Them was published by Apollo.

Parliament of the United Kingdom
Preceded by Terry Davis	Member of Parliament for Birmingham Hodge Hill; 2004–2024	Constituency abolished
New constituency	Member of Parliament for Birmingham Hodge Hill and Solihull North; 2024–present	Incumbent
Political offices
Preceded by Tony McNulty as Minister of State for Immigration, Citizenship and Nationality	Minister of State for Borders and Immigration; 2006–2008	Succeeded by Phil Woolas
New office	Minister for the West Midlands; 2007–2008	Succeeded by Ian Austin
Preceded by Ed Miliband	Minister for the Cabinet Office; 2008–2009	Succeeded by Tessa Jowell
Preceded by Ed Miliband	Chancellor of the Duchy of Lancaster; 2008–2009	Succeeded by The Baroness Royall of Blaisdon
Preceded by Yvette Cooper	Chief Secretary to the Treasury; 2009–2010	Succeeded by David Laws
Preceded by Philip Hammond	Shadow Chief Secretary to the Treasury; 2010	Succeeded by Angela Eagle
Preceded by Tessa Jowell	Shadow Minister for the Cabinet Office; 2010–2011	Succeeded by Tessa Jowell
Preceded by Douglas Alexander	Shadow Secretary of State for Work and Pensions; 2011–2013	Succeeded by Rachel Reeves
