= Siôn Simon =

British politician

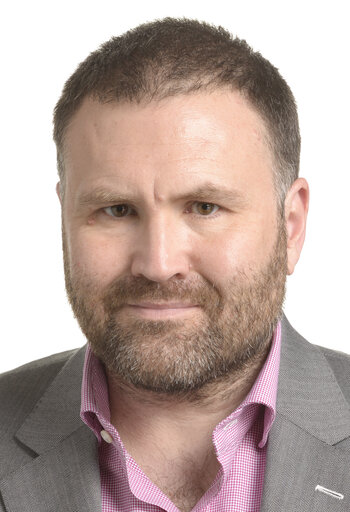
- Official portrait, 2014

Member of the European Parliament for West Midlands
- In office 1 July 2014 – 1 July 2019
- Preceded by: Michael Cashman
- Succeeded by: Ellie Chowns

Parliamentary Under-Secretary for Creative Industries
- In office 9 June 2009 – 11 May 2010
- Prime Minister: Gordon Brown
- Preceded by: Barbara Follett (as Minister for Culture, Tourism and Creative Industries)
- Succeeded by: Ed Vaizey (as Parliamentary Under-Secretary of State for Culture, Communications and Creative Industries)

Parliamentary Under-Secretary for Further Education
- In office 5 October 2008 – 9 June 2009
- Prime Minister: Gordon Brown
- Preceded by: David Lammy
- Succeeded by: Kevin Brennan (as Minister of State)

Member of Parliament for Birmingham Erdington
- In office 7 June 2001 – 12 April 2010
- Preceded by: Robin Corbett
- Succeeded by: Jack Dromey

Personal details
- Born: Siôn Llewelyn Simon; 23 December 1968 (age 57) Doncaster, West Riding of Yorkshire, England
- Party: Labour
- Education: Magdalen College, Oxford
- Website: www.sion-simon.org.uk

Siôn [ʃoːn] Llewelyn Simon (born 23 December 1968) is a British Labour Party politician who served as the Member of Parliament (MP) for Birmingham Erdington from 2001 to 2010 and as a Member of the European Parliament (MEP) for the West Midlands from 2014 to 2019.

Simon was the Parliamentary Under-Secretary of State for Further Education from 2008 to 2009 and Parliamentary Under-Secretary of State for Creative Industries from 2009 to 2010. He stood down at the 2010 general election to campaign for a directly elected mayor of Birmingham, with the intent of standing in the first election. In 2014 Simon was elected a Member of the European Parliament for the West Midlands. In 2016 he was selected as the Labour Party candidate for Mayor of the West Midlands but was defeated in the 2017 election by 50.4% to 49.6% of the vote in the final round. In 2019, he lost his seat at the European Parliament election.

== Early life ==
Simon was born in Doncaster to Welsh-speaking parents, and was raised in Birmingham, where he lived in Great Barr, Handsworth and Handsworth Wood. His parents were both teachers in Birmingham. He attended Handsworth Grammar School, where he joined the Labour Party at the age of 16. Simon enrolled at Magdalen College, Oxford, in 1987, where he read Philosophy, Politics and Economics. He was elected President of the college Junior Common Room in his second year.

After university, he was a research assistant for George Robertson MP for three years. He worked for two years in the Guinness management team at Diageo, then a FTSE top 20 company. He then freelanced at speechwriting, policy and advice. His clients included Tony Blair while in opposition, Microsoft UK, the International Duty Free Confederation and various charities and communication companies. He then became a journalist, working for The Daily Telegraph, the Daily Express and the News of the World. He was also an associate editor at The Spectator. His columns varied from restaurant reviews to politics.

In the 1992 election campaign, Simon ran the European desk for the Labour Party and then, during the 1997 election campaign, the foreign press department at Labour Party headquarters.

== Member of Parliament ==
Simon was first elected in the 2001 general election for Birmingham Erdington with a majority of 9,962. He retained the seat in 2005 with a slightly reduced majority of 9,575.

As a backbencher he served on the Public Accounts Committee, Treasury Select Committee, chaired the All-Party Parliamentary Group on Private Equity and Venture Capital and the All-Party Parliamentary Group on Business Services.

Shortly after Gordon Brown became Prime Minister in July 2007, Simon became vice-chair of the Labour Party, with special responsibility to draft the "Law and Order" manifesto for the upcoming 2010 general election.

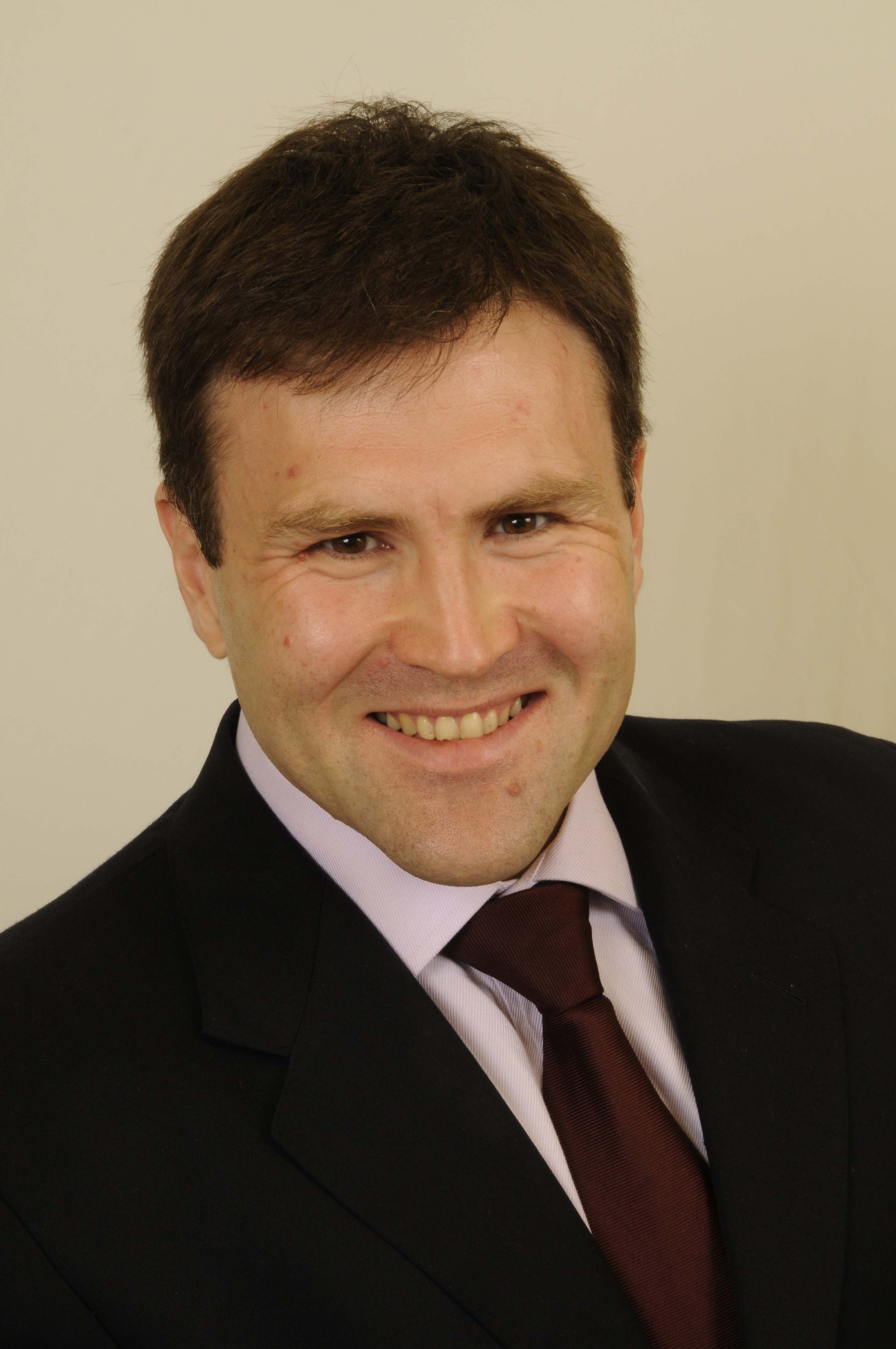
Official portrait, 2008

Following the October 2008 reshuffle, Simon was appointed Parliamentary Under-Secretary of State for Further Education in the Department for Innovation, Universities and Skills. In June 2009 he became Parliamentary Under Secretary of State for Creative Industries in the Department for Culture, Media and Sport.

On 3 February 2010 he announced he would not stand for re-election to Parliament, in order to campaign for a directly elected mayor of Birmingham, and stand in a subsequent election. A referendum was held in Birmingham on 3 May 2012, but the proposal was defeated with 57.8% of the vote.

After leaving parliament, Simon founded the website Labour Uncut in May 2010. In 2011, he wrote a cover story for Newsweek about the August riot disturbances. He also supported HS2 in an article for Progress. He wrote a chapter in What Next for Labour? Ideas for a new generation titled "Why Mayors Matter and Why Labour Should Support them".

== Member of the European Parliament ==
Placed second on Labour's candidate list, Simon was elected as a Member of the European Parliament for the West Midlands in the 2014 European Parliament elections alongside Neena Gill. In 2014 he joined the European Parliament Committee on Employment and Social Affairs. He lost his seat at the 2019 election.

During the 2016 EU membership referendum vote, Simon participated in the Labour in for Britain pro-EU campaign.

== Mayoral candidate ==
In 2016, Simon was selected as the Labour candidate for Mayor of the West Midlands. He was defeated in the 2017 mayoral election by Conservative candidate Andy Street by 50.4% of the vote to 49.6% in the final round.

== Controversies ==
On 5 September 2006, he and Chris Bryant co-ordinated a letter, signed by 17 Labour backbenchers, calling for Tony Blair to resign as prime minister. The MPs failed to force Blair out of office, but Blair publicly pledged to stand down within 12 months.

In October 2006, Simon created a YouTube spoof of Conservative Party leader David Cameron's video blog, in which, pretending to be Cameron, he offered viewers one of his children and the opportunity to sleep with his wife. This led to criticism from both parties, with the stunt being called "tasteless". In an interview on Sky News the same day, Simon defended himself and described Cameron's attempts to reach out to the youth culture as "shallow" and "pathetic". The video was removed on 13 October by Tom Watson, whom he described as a "proppa blogga".

In 2009, it was revealed that Simon had breached parliamentary rules by renting his "second home" in London from his sister, Ceri Erskine, and paying her more than £40,000 in taxpayer-funded expenses. Simon claimed that he had inadvertently broken the rules and agreed to repay £21,000. He apologised "unreservedly". Six weeks later Simon announced that he would resign from the government and stand down as MP for Birmingham Erdington.

== Personal life ==
Simon was the boyfriend of former Labour and Change UK MP Luciana Berger in 2009–2010. Simon suffers from the rare genetic disorder choroideremia: a condition that leads to progressive deterioration in eyesight, and in its later stage, blindness. He co-founded, and works as a trustee for, the Choroideremia Research Foundation. In 2017, it was revealed that Simon had donated a kidney to Labour MP Khalid Mahmood.

Simon lives in Birmingham, is a member of the Royal Shakespeare Company, and a season ticket holder at West Bromwich Albion F.C.

Parliament of the United Kingdom
| Preceded by Robin Corbett | Member of Parliament for Birmingham Erdington; 2001–2010 | Succeeded by Jack Dromey |
| Preceded by David Lammy | Parliamentary Under-Secretary of State for Further Education; 2008–2009 | Succeeded by Kevin Brennan (as Minister of State) |
