= Mayor of the West Midlands =

Chair of the West Midlands Combined Authority

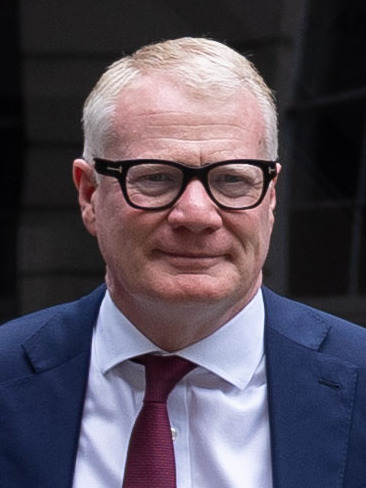
- Incumbent; Richard Parker since 6 May 2024
- West Midlands Combined Authority
- Style: Mayor
- Member of: West Midlands Combined Authority
- Seat: 16 Summer Lane, Birmingham
- Appointer: Electorate of West Midlands; by first past the post
- Term length: 4 years
- Constituting instrument: Cities and Local Government Devolution Act 2016
- Inaugural holder: Andy Street
- Formation: 8 May 2017
- Deputy: TBA
- Salary: £79,000
- Website: West Midlands Combined Authority - The Mayor

The mayor of the West Midlands is a directly elected strategic authority mayor who chairs the West Midlands Combined Authority, covering the local authorities serving Birmingham, Coventry, Dudley, Sandwell, Solihull, Walsall and Wolverhampton.

The most recent election took place on Thursday 2 May 2024. Richard Parker took his post as mayor after defeating former incumbent Andy Street by 1,508 votes.

The previous election was delayed for a year due to the COVID-19 pandemic, so the inaugural mayoral term was extended by a year, with the second term length being reduced to three years between 2021 and 2024. The Mayor's term of office will return to four years from 2024 thereafter.

== Powers and functions ==
=== Homes and Land ===
The mayor has devolved compulsory purchase powers and is responsible for the West Midlands spatial framework and land commission.

=== Transport ===
The mayor is responsible for franchised bus services, allowing for standardised fares and branding on all bus services in the county, similar to how London's bus network operates. The Mayor is also responsible for the West Midlands Key Route Network, which is managed by Transport for West Midlands on behalf of the Mayor.

=== Devolution ===
The mayor is responsible for ensuring that the first devolution deal is put into action and acts on behalf of the region in negotiating future devolution deals with central government.

The mayor is a member of the Mayoral Council for England and the Council of the Nations and Regions.

=== Police and crime commissioner ===
The mayor was to be vested with the police and crime commissioner functions for the West Midlands Police area from 7 May 2024. Due to an appeal by the current West Midlands PCC, the PCC powers was not be given to the West Midlands mayor.

== List of mayors ==
Colour key
(for political parties)
Conservative
Labour

Name	Picture	Term of office		Elected	Political party	Previous occupations
Andy Street		8 May 2017	5 May 2024	2017; 2021	Conservative	Former managing director of John Lewis
Richard Parker		6 May 2024	Incumbent	2024	Labour and Co-operative	Former strategy consultant and partner of PwC
