= John Edmondson, 2nd Baron Sandford =

British naval officer, clergyman, and politician

Commander John Cyril Edmondson, 2nd Baron Sandford, DSC (22 December 1920 – 13 January 2009) was a decorated Royal Navy officer, Church of England clergyman, conservationist and Conservative politician. As a junior minister charged with a review of policy on national parks, he formulated what became known as the "Sandford principle": if there is a conflict between leisure use of the National Park, and protecting its natural state, the state of the park must be preserved.

Sandford was the eldest son of Albert Edmondson, 1st Baron Sandford, and his wife Edith Elizabeth (née Freeman, and sister to Ralph, Arnold and Peter). He was educated at St Cyprian's School, Eton, and the Royal Naval College, Dartmouth and later trained for Holy Orders at Westcott House, Cambridge. He served in the Royal Navy in the Second World War, notably at the landings in North Africa, Sicily and Normandy, where he was wounded. For his actions at Normandy he was awarded the Distinguished Service Cross. After the war he was wounded on HMS Saumarez in the Corfu Channel Incident in 1946. He was on the staff of the Royal Naval College in Dartmouth from 1947 to 1949, served on HMS Vengeance in 1950 and on HMS Cleopatra from 1951 to 1952, was on the staff of the Commander-in-Chief in the Far East from 1953 to 1955, and was commander of the Home Fleet Flagship HMS Tyne in 1956. The latter year Sandford retired from the Royal Navy with the rank of Commander. In 1958 he was ordained in the Church of England and served as Curate of the Parish of St Nicholas in Harpenden from 1958 to 1963 and as Executive Chaplain to the Bishop of St Albans from 1965 to 1968.

Sandford succeeded his father in the barony in 1959 and took his seat on the Conservative benches in the House of Lords. He was an Opposition Whip in the House of Lords from 1966 to 1970 and served in the Conservative administration of Edward Heath as Joint Parliamentary Secretary to the Ministry of Housing and Local Government in 1970, as Joint Parliamentary Under-Secretary of State for the Department of the Environment from 1970 to 1973 and as Joint Parliamentary Under-Secretary of State for the Department of Education and Science from 1973 to 1974. As chair of the National Parks Policy Review Committee from 1971 to 1974 he gave name to the Sandford Principle. He was the Chairman of the Institution of Environmental Sciences, from 1977 to 1980, and was awarded Honorary Fellowship in 1981. Sandford has later served as President of the Council for Environmental Education from 1975 to 1984, as Chairman of the Community Task Force from 1977 to 1982 and of the Conference in South-East regional Planning from 1981 to 1988, as President of the Association of District Councils from 1980 to 1986 and as a Church Commissioner from 1981 to 1988. He remained a member of the House of Lords until the passing of the House of Lords Act 1999 removed the automatic right of hereditary peers sit in the upper chamber of Parliament.

Sandford married Catharine Mary, daughter of Reverend Oswald Andrew Hunt, in 1947. They had two sons and two daughters. His elder son, James, succeeded him.

== Arms ==
Coat of arms of John Edmondson, 2nd Baron Sandford

Crest
In front of a portcullis Or a dexter arm embowed in armour fesswise the hand clenched Proper.
Escutcheon
Azure a cross couped and pointed between in chief two lions combatant and in base as many swans' wings elevated and addorsed respectant all Or.
Supporters
On either side a pikeman of the Honourable Artillery Company armed and accoutred supporting with the exterior hand a pike erect Proper the dexter charged with a portcullis chained Or and the sinister with an oak tree eradicated and fructed also Proper the trunk pierced by three arrows Or flighted Azure (the badge of the Edmonson family).
Motto
Cuicunque Ferienti Aperietur

Political offices
Preceded by The Lord Kennet; Arthur Skeffington; Reg Freeson	Parliamentary Secretary to the Ministry of Housing and Local Government with Eldon Griffiths; Paul Channon; 1970	Succeeded by Office abolished
Preceded by Eldon Griffiths; Paul Channon	Under-Secretary of State for the Environment with Eldon Griffiths 1970–1973; Paul Channon 1970–1972; Michael Heseltine 1970–1972; Keith Speed 1972–1973; Reginald Eyre 1972–1973; 1970–1973	Succeeded by Eldon Griffiths; Keith Speed; Reginald Eyre
Preceded by Norman St John-Stevas; Timothy Raison	Under-Secretary of State for Education and Science with Timothy Raison; 1973–1974	Succeeded by Ernest Armstrong
Peerage of the United Kingdom
Preceded by Albert James Edmondson	Baron Sandford; 1959–2009	Succeeded by James Edmondson
