= Minister of the Navy =

Minister of the Navy may refer to:

- Minister of the Navy (France)
- Minister of the Navy (Italy)
- Minister of the Navy (Japan)
- Minister of the Navy (Netherlands)
- Minister of the Navy (Norway)
- Minister of the Navy (Spain)
- Minister of the Navy (Turkey)
- Minister of the Navy (United Kingdom)
