= Caroline Spelman =

British politician (born 1958)

The Right Honourable Dame Caroline Spelman DBE
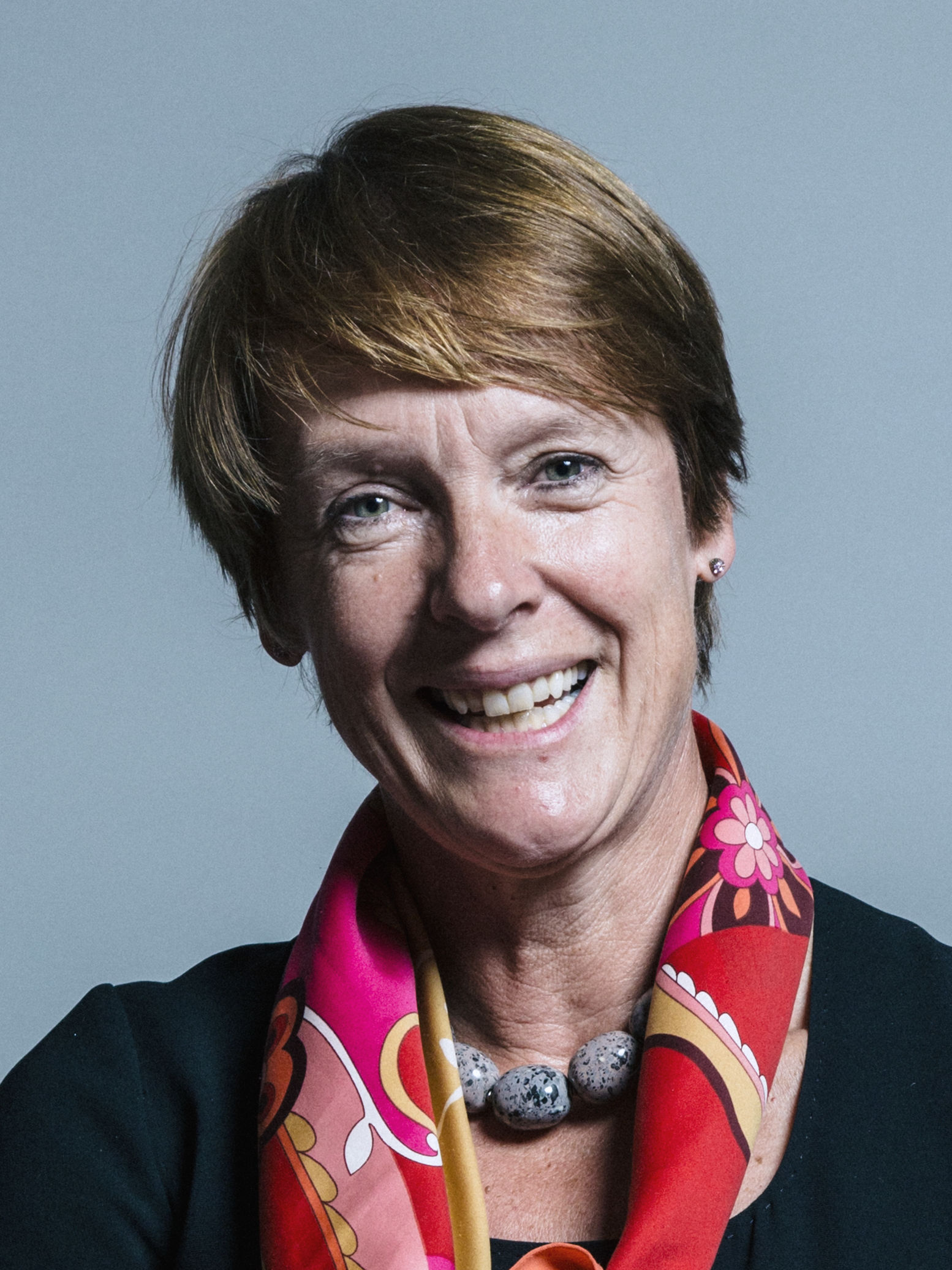
- Official portrait, 2017

Second Church Estates Commissioner
- In office 21 May 2015 – 12 December 2019
- Prime Minister: David Cameron; Theresa May; Boris Johnson
- Preceded by: Tony Baldry
- Succeeded by: Andrew Selous

Secretary of State for Environment, Food and Rural Affairs
- In office 12 May 2010 – 4 September 2012
- Prime Minister: David Cameron
- Preceded by: Hilary Benn
- Succeeded by: Owen Paterson

Chairman of the Conservative Party
- In office 2 July 2007 – 19 January 2009
- Leader: David Cameron
- Preceded by: Francis Maude
- Succeeded by: Eric Pickles
Shadow Cabinet positions
Shadow Secretary of State for Communities and Local Government
In office 19 January 2009 – 12 May 2010
Leader	David Cameron
Preceded by	Eric Pickles
Succeeded by	John Denham
In office 15 March 2004 – 2 July 2007
Leader	Michael Howard; David Cameron
Preceded by	David Curry (Local and Devolved Government Affairs)
Succeeded by	Eric Pickles
Shadow Secretary of State for the Environment
In office 10 November 2003 – 15 March 2004
Leader	Michael Howard
Preceded by	David Lidington (Environment, Food and Rural Affairs)
Succeeded by	Richard Ottaway
Shadow Secretary of State for International Development
In office 18 September 2001 – 10 November 2003
Leader	Iain Duncan Smith
Preceded by	Gary Streeter
Succeeded by	John Bercow
Shadow Minister for Women
In office 14 September 2001 – 15 March 2004
Leader	Iain Duncan Smith; Michael Howard
Preceded by	Theresa May
Succeeded by	Eleanor Laing

Member of Parliament for Meriden
- In office 1 May 1997 – 6 November 2019
- Preceded by: Iain Mills
- Succeeded by: Saqib Bhatti

Personal details
- Born: Caroline Alice Cormack; 4 May 1958 (age 68) Bishop's Stortford, Hertfordshire, England
- Party: Conservative
- Spouse: Mark Spelman (m. 1987)
- Children: 3
- Education: Queen Mary College, University of London
- Website: Official website

Dame Caroline Alice Spelman DBE (née Cormack; born 4 May 1958) is a British Conservative Party politician who served as the Member of Parliament (MP) for Meriden in the West Midlands from 1997 to 2019. From May 2010 to September 2012 she was the Secretary of State for Environment, Food and Rural Affairs in David Cameron's coalition cabinet, and was sworn as a Privy Counsellor on 13 May 2010.

== Education ==
Born in Bishop's Stortford, Hertfordshire, Spelman attended the Hertfordshire and Essex High School for Girls (now called The Hertfordshire and Essex High School), in Bishop's Stortford, and received a BA First Class in European Studies from Queen Mary College, University of London.

== Early career ==
She was sugar beet commodity secretary for the National Farmers' Union from 1981 to 1984. She was deputy director of the International Confederation of European Beet Growers (officially known as La Confédération Internationale des Betteraviers Européens – CIBE) in Paris from 1984 to 1989, then a research fellow for the Centre for European Agricultural Studies (part of the University of Kent and since 2000 known as the Centre for European Agri-Environmental Economics) from 1989 to 1993. She co-owns Spelman, Cormack & Associates, a lobbying company for the food and biotechnology industry, with her husband.

== Parliamentary career ==
Before entering Parliament in 1997, she stood unsuccessfully in the Bassetlaw constituency in Nottinghamshire at the 1992 general election.

In 2001, Iain Duncan Smith appointed Spelman Shadow Secretary of State for International Development, a post she maintained until Duncan Smith's departure as Conservative Party leader. Duncan Smith's successor, Michael Howard, opted for a streamlined Shadow Cabinet and omitted Spelman; however, he later appointed her as a front bench spokeswoman on Environmental Affairs working for Theresa May. In March 2004, Spelman re-entered the Shadow Cabinet as Shadow Secretary of State for Local and Devolved Government Affairs, succeeding David Curry. Under David Cameron's leadership of the Conservative Party, in 2007 she was promoted further to become Conservative Party Chairman.

In 2009, Spelman was moved in another reshuffle to the role of Shadow Secretary of State for Communities and Local Government, replacing Eric Pickles.

Between 2010 and 2012, Spelman served as Secretary of State for Environment, Food, and Rural Affairs. In this role, she helped secure a UN agreement on biodiversity in Nagoya (Japan), and the Sustainable Development Goals agreement in Rio. She contributed to the government's "collaborative working" on the transition to a green economy, while in an interview with the Institute for Government, she highlighted her Nature Environment White Paper laying out the Government's vision to 2060, as one of her "greatest achievements" in office.

In 2012, Spelman returned to the Commons backbenches.

Spelman served as Second Church Estates Commissioner from 2015 to 2019.

Spelman was opposed to Brexit prior to the 2016 referendum. In January 2019 MPs approved a symbolic, non-binding amendment, tabled by Spelman, to prevent a no-deal Brexit, by 318 votes to 310.

Following abuse and death threats over Brexit, Spelman announced in September 2019 that she would not seek re-election at the next general election.

== Expenses ==
In 2009, during the expenses scandal it was reported that Spelman had received £40,000 for cleaning and bills for her constituency home; this was despite her husband claiming it was their main home. In 2008 she reportedly over-claimed hundreds of pounds towards her council tax.

=== "Nannygate" controversy ===
On 6 June 2008, Spelman was the subject of controversy when it was suggested that for around twelve months from May 1997 she paid her child's nanny, Tina Haynes, from her parliamentary staffing allowance, contrary to the rule governing such allowances and fears of the misuse of them. Spelman claims that her nanny also acted as her constituency secretary and was paid from the public taxpayers' purse for this aspect of her further employment. Haynes confirms that occasionally she would answer phone calls and post documents but initially she denied such happenings when interviewed on BBC Two's Newsnight via telephone. The accusations came at a time when Conservative Party leader David Cameron had tasked Spelman with reviewing the use of parliamentary allowances by Conservative MPs and MEPs in the wake of the Derek Conway affair.

The allegation against Spelman came shortly after two Conservative MEPs, Giles Chichester (Leader of the Conservatives in the EU Parliament) and Den Dover (Conservative Chief Whip in the EU Parliament), were forced to resign amid claims they misused their parliamentary allowances. However, Spelman was not urged to resign by party leader, David Cameron. She referred the matter pertaining to herself, her nanny and parliamentary funds to John Lyon, the Parliamentary Commissioner for Standards. Senior Conservative colleagues including former Shadow Home Secretary David Davis stated their support for Spelman.

New allegations were reported on the BBC's Newsnight programme that nine years previously Spelman's secretary, Sally Hammond, complained to the Conservative Party leadership that she was using Parliamentary allowances to pay her nanny and that the arrangement with the nanny was over a two-year period and not one.

In March 2009, the Commons Standards and Privileges Committee ruled that Caroline Spelman had misused her allowances to pay for nannying work in 1997 and 1998.

== Privacy injunction ==
On 24 February 2012, the High Court in London refused to continue a privacy injunction previously granted to prevent the publication of a news item in the Daily Star Sunday involving her son. Judge Michael Tugendhat said that the injunction was "not necessary or proportionate". On 2 March 2012, the Spelmans decided not to appeal against the decision, which permitted the publication of a story about her son. The Spelman family was required to pay the legal costs of the Daily Star Sunday, in addition to their own legal costs of £60,994.

== Personal life ==
She married Mark Spelman, a senior partner at Accenture, on 25 April 1987 in south-east Kent. Her husband stood as a Conservative candidate in the 2009 European elections for the West Midlands region. They have two sons and a daughter. In 1997, Spelman was the only Conservative MP who was also a mother of school-age children; the Conservative party instructed that her children should be educated in her constituency as a condition of her selection as MP. As a result, Spelman rarely saw her children and she found this period of her life very stressful, losing a significant amount of weight.

The couple own a constituency home, a London townhouse and a villa in Algarve, Portugal.

She is a Patron of the Conservative Christian Fellowship.

Spelman was made a Dame Commander of the Order of the British Empire for political and public service as part of the Resignation Honours of the outgoing Prime Minister David Cameron.

Parliament of the United Kingdom
Preceded by Iain Mills	Member of Parliament for Meriden; 1997–2019	Succeeded by Saqib Bhatti
Political offices
Preceded by Gary Streeter	Shadow Secretary of State for International Development; 2001–2003	Succeeded by John Bercow
Preceded by Theresa May	Shadow Minister for Women; 2001–2004	Succeeded by Eleanor Laing
Preceded by David Lidington as Shadow Secretary of State for Environment, Food and Rural Affairs	Shadow Secretary of State for the Environment; 2003–2004	Succeeded by Richard Ottaway
Preceded by David Curry as Shadow Secretary of State for Local and Devolved Government Affairs	Shadow Secretary of State for Communities and Local Government; 2004–2007	Succeeded by Eric Pickles
Preceded by Eric Pickles	Shadow Secretary of State for Communities and Local Government; 2009–2010	Succeeded by John Denham
Preceded by Hilary Benn	Secretary of State for Environment, Food and Rural Affairs; 2010–2012	Succeeded by Owen Paterson
Party political offices
Preceded by Francis Maude	Chairman of the Conservative Party; 2007–2009	Succeeded by Eric Pickles
