= Labour government, 1974–1979 =

Government of the United Kingdom from 1974 to 1979

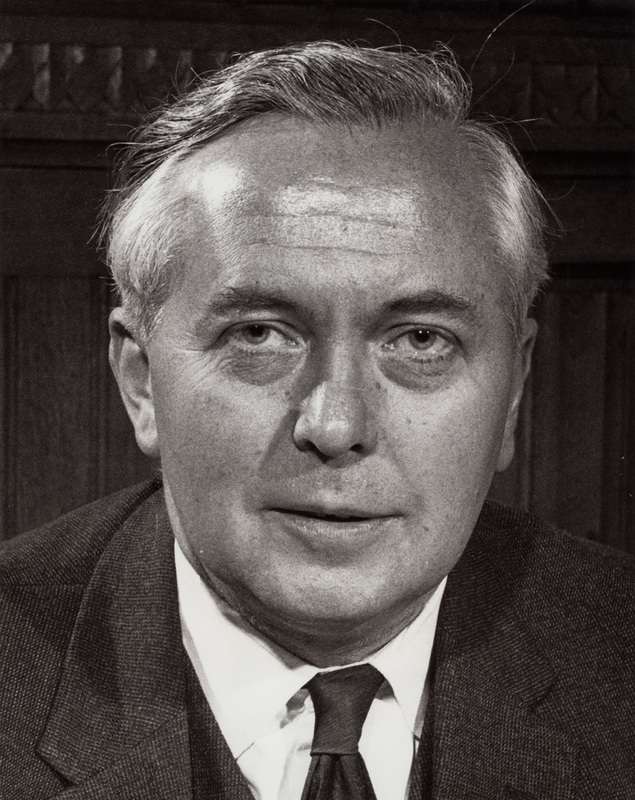
Harold Wilson led the Government from 1974 to 1976, and was succeeded by James Callaghan.

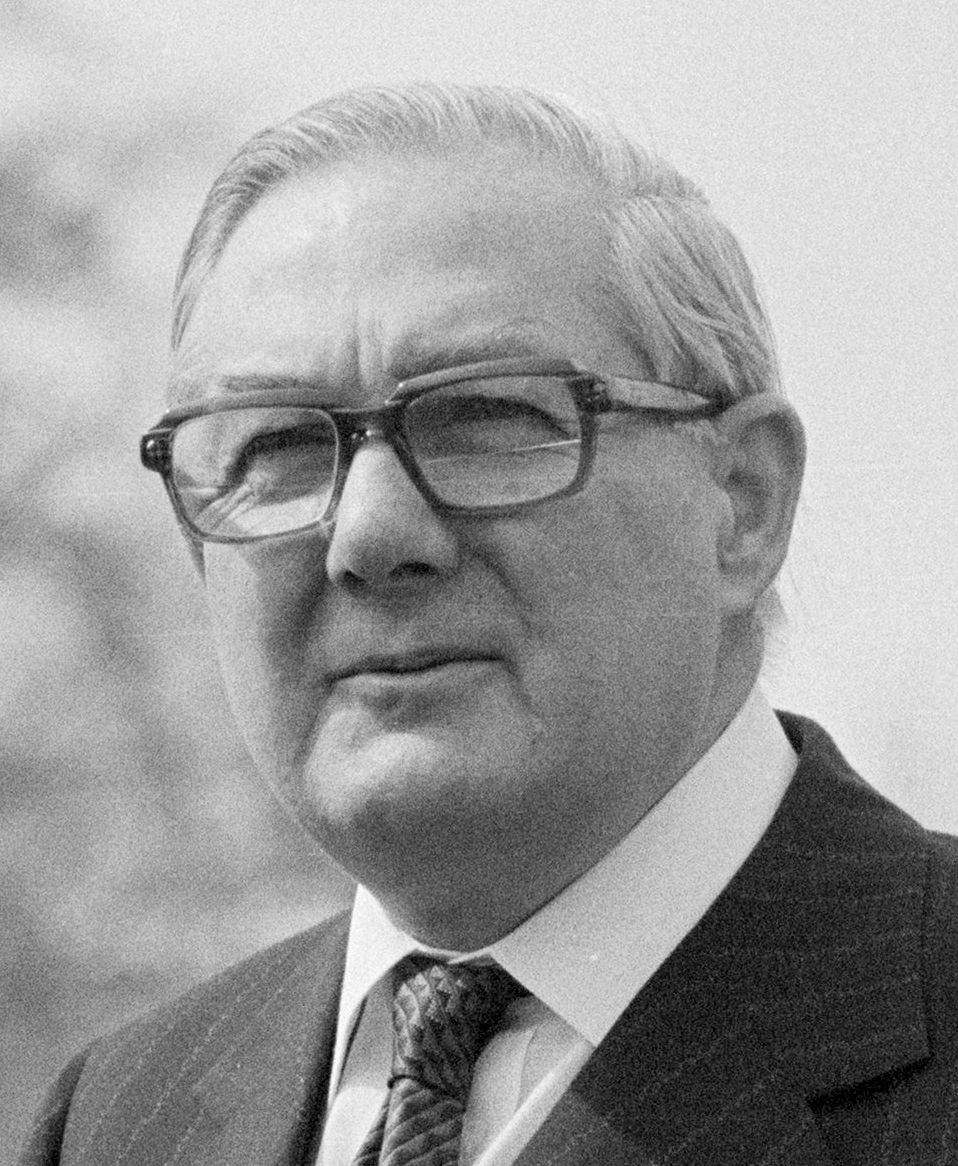
Callaghan led the Government from 1976 onward. He was defeated at the 1979 general election.

The Labour Party governed the United Kingdom from 1974 to 1979. During this period, Harold Wilson and James Callaghan were successively appointed as Prime Minister by Queen Elizabeth II. The end of the Callaghan ministry was presaged by the Winter of Discontent, a period of serious industrial discontent. This was followed by the election of the Conservatives led by Margaret Thatcher in 1979.

The government consisted of three ministries: the third and fourth Wilson ministry, and then the Callaghan ministry. After the 1979 election defeat Labour would not return to government for another 18 years until 1997 and the first Blair ministry.

== History ==
=== Formation ===
Following the February 1974 general election, no party had a majority of seats. The incumbent Conservative Party won the popular vote, but Labour took a plurality of seats. Edward Heath, the Conservative Prime Minister, attempted to negotiate a coalition agreement with the Liberal Party, but resigned as prime minister after failing to do so. The Labour Party, led by Harold Wilson, then established a minority government, which took office on 4 March 1974.

It was recognised that this had no long-term stability, and that another general election was likely within a few months. On 20 September Wilson called another snap election for 10 October, which resulted in a narrow victory for the Labour Party with a slim majority of three seats.

The economy was in recession by the time of the February 1974 election, but economic growth was re-established by 1976—although inflation, which had run into double digits before Labour came to power, was now above 20%. It would remain high for the rest of this ministry, rarely falling below 10%. Unemployment was now well in excess of 1,000,000 people, whereas it had been less than 600,000 at the start of the decade. This was the result of the economic decline, as well as advancing engineering techniques which required fewer personnel, along with other factors including the closure of unprofitable factories and coalmines. The government was forced into an interventionist policy to protect jobs - the most symbolic example being the largest home producer of cars, buses and trucks - British Leyland (BL) - which had been beset with poor profitability and a myriad of industrial relations problems was forced into public ownership in 1975, and became part of the newly established National Enterprise Board. BL would remain a major headache for the remainder of the government's term in office and for the Conservatives subsequently with full re-privatisation not occurring until the late 1980s.

On 16 March 1976, having just turned sixty years old, Wilson resigned as prime minister, ending his leadership of the Labour Party after thirteen years, and a total of nearly eight years as prime minister. He was replaced by James Callaghan, who had held senior government positions during both of Wilson's ministries, and had served as a Shadow Cabinet member in the early 1960s.

In 1976, Britain faced financial crisis. The Labour government was forced to apply to the International Monetary Fund (IMF) for a loan of nearly $4 billion. IMF negotiators insisted on deep cuts in public expenditure, greatly affecting economic and social policy.

Within a year of Callaghan taking office, the narrow Labour majority was eliminated due to by-election defeats, prompting a vote of confidence which prevented the government's collapse and a general election from being called. In order to sustain the government, Labour formed the Lib–Lab pact in March 1977 and this remained in force for sixteen months. This minority government also managed to stay in power with unofficial deals with the Ulster Unionist Party and Scottish National Party.

By September 1978, economic growth was firmly re-established and inflation was below 10%, although unemployment now stood at a post-war high of 1.5 million. With most of the opinion polls showing a clear Labour lead, it was widely expected that Callaghan would call a general election that autumn, despite having another year to do so, in order to gain a majority and give his government the chance of surviving in office until 1983.

However, he resisted these calls and Britain began 1979 with Labour still in power and Callaghan still in charge, but his failure to call a general election during the autumn of 1978 would prove to be the end of this Labour government.

=== Major contributions ===
Although the 1974–1979 Labour Government faced a number of economic difficulties, it was nevertheless able to carry out a broad range of reforms during its time in office. During Harold Wilson's final premiership, from 1974 to 1976, a number of changes were carried out such as the introduction of new social security benefits and improvements in the rights of tenants. In March 1974, an additional £2 billion was announced for benefits, food subsidies, and housing subsidies, including a record 25% increase in the state pension. Council house rents were also frozen. Council house building continued on a substantial scale, although there was now a greater emphasis on modernising older properties rather than replacing them with new ones. That year, national insurance benefits were increased by 13%, which brought pensions as a proportion of average earnings "up to a value equivalent to the previous high, which was reached in 1965 as a result of Labour legislation." In order to maintain the real value of these benefits in the long term, the government introduced legislation which linked future increases in pensions to higher incomes or wages. In 1974–1975, social spending was increased in real terms by 9%. In 1974, pensions were increased in real terms by 14%, while in early 1975 increases were made in family allowances. There were also significant increases in rate and rent subsidies, together with £500 million worth of food subsidies.

An independent Advisory, Conciliation and Arbitration Service (now simply called Acas) (regarded as the brainchild of the trade union leader Jack Jones) was established, which according to Robert Taylor continues to provide "an impartial and impressive function in resolving disputes and encouraging good industrial relations practice." A Manpower Services Commission was set up to encourage a more active labour market policy to improve job placements and deal with unemployment. The Pay Board was abolished, while the Price Commission was provided with greater powers to control and delay price increases. In addition, the Rehabilitation of Offenders Act 1974 prohibited employers from discriminating against ex-offenders where offences were minor and committed a long time ago, and the Housing Rents and Subsidies Act 1975 gave power over rents back to local authorities.

To help those with disabilities, the government introduced an Invalid Care Allowance, a Mobility Allowance, a Non-Contributory Invalidity Pension for those unable to contribute through national insurance, and other measures. To combat child poverty, legislation to create a universal Child Benefit was passed in 1975 (a reform later implemented by the Callaghan government). To raise the living standards of those dependent on national insurance benefits, the government index-linked short-term benefits to the rate of inflation, while pensions and long-term benefits were tied to increases in prices or earnings, whichever was higher.

A State Earnings Related Pension Scheme (SERPS) was also introduced. A new pension, which was inflation-proofed and linked to earnings, was added to the basic pension which was to increase in line with earnings for the first time ever. This reform assisted women by linking pensions to the 'twenty best years' of earnings, and those who worked at home caring for children or others were counted as contributors. This scheme was reformed by the subsequent Thatcher ministry. while the wage stop was finally abolished.

A Resource Allocation Working Party was also set up to produce a formula for a more equitable distribution of healthcare expenditure. Anthony Crosland, while serving as a minister during Wilson's second ministry, made a decision to reform the level of Rate Support Grant, introducing a standard level of relief across the country to benefit poorer urban areas.

The Damages (Scotland) Act of 1976 “amended the law relating to damages in respect of personal injuries and of death caused by such injuries, and abolished the action of indemnification.” The Education Act of 1976 also repealed part of the Education (Milk) Act 1971 “whereby local authorities were to charge for school milk.” The Bail Act of 1976 “created a presumption in favour of the grant of bail in criminal proceedings, required courts to give reasons when refusing bail, replaced the system of personal recognisances for defendants by a new offence of absconding while on bail, required that a person who is remanded in custody more than once should have the opportunity of obtaining legal aid, and effected certain improvements to the surety system.” The Fair Employment (Northern Ireland) Act of 1976 barred discrimination in employment in Northern Ireland on the grounds of religion and politics, and also established the Fair Employment Agency for Northern Ireland to promote equal job opportunity.

In April 1976, a Child Interim Benefit for single-parent families was introduced, which was preceded by a universal Child Benefit scheme introduced the following year. The Supplementary Benefit (Amendment) Act of 1976 amended the amount of earnings and other income of the parent in a one-parent family to be disregarded in calculating resources for comparison with requirements, and also amended certain social security and other allowances for children. The Industrial Common Ownership Act of 1976 gave the Secretary of State the power to “give up to £30,000 in grants and up to £250,000 in loans to common ownership enterprises, that is those bodies without share-capital and controlled by a majority of their workers.” The Rent (Agriculture) Act of 1976 gave security of tenure to certain agricultural workers, ex-workers and their successors living in housing provided by farmers, and also laid duty on housing authorities to rehouse occupiers of ‘tied cottages’ when dwellings are needed to house incoming workers.

The Congenital Disabilities (Civil Liability) Act 1976 provided that children injured while in utero could sue after birth. The Policyholders Protection Act 1975 introduced safeguards for customers of failed insurance companies.

The Supplementary Benefits Act 1976 gave every person over the age of sixteen, whose resources were not enough to meet his or her basic needs, the right to claim a supplementary pension if he or she had reached state pension age, and a supplementary allowance if he or she was less than this age. The Rent (Agricultural) Act 1976 provided security of tenure for agricultural workers in tied accommodation, while the Bail Act 1976 reformed bail conditions with courts having to explain refusal of bail. The Police Act 1976 set up a Police Complaints Board "to formalise the procedure for dealing with public complaints". The Education Act 1976 limited the taking up of independent and direct grant school places and required all local authorities who had failed to do so "to submit proposals for comprehensive schools", while the Housing (Homeless Persons) Act 1977 extended local council responsibility "to provide accommodation for homeless people in their area," and instituted the right of homeless families to a permanent local council tenancy. In addition, efforts were made under the Environment Secretary Peter Shore to redistribute resources toward deprived urban areas.

The Callaghan Government also introduced a range of measures aimed at moderating pressures for wage rises and to create a favourable climate "for an orderly restoration of collective bargaining". These included the granting of family income supplements to bring the incomes of lower-paid workers up to the level of social security benefits, the lowering of marginal tax rates on smaller incomes by rises in personal allowances, and increases in children's allowances (which were payable to the mother). However, child tax allowances were lowered, which had the effect of reducing the take-home pay of fathers. The impact of consumer price rises was also mitigated by higher income limits for free school meals, an increased milk subsidy, and a substantial reduction in the duty on petrol. In addition, electricity prices were lowered for families in receipt of supplementary benefits.

A number of new services and benefits for disabled people were also introduced. A Non-Contributory Invalidity Pension in lieu of ‘pocket money’ allowance for long-stay patients in mental hospitals was introduced. The therapeutic earnings limit for recipients of Invalidity Pension, Non-Contributory Invalidity Pension and Unemployability Supplement was raised while the Private Car Maintenance Allowance for War Pensioners was increased. From the 29th of August 1977, Attendance Allowance became payable to foster parents of disabled children, and was also extended to kidney patients dialysing at home. Industrial injury provisions for occupational deafness were introduced, and viral hepatitis and Vinyl Chloride Monomer induced diseases were prescribed as industrial diseases. Easing of conditions for entitlement to industrial death benefit in certain cases of death from pulmonary disease was carried out. £12.1 million was paid to the Rowntree Trust Family Fund for disabled children, while the terms of reference of the Rowntree Trust Family Fund were extended to include all severely disabled children. Limited right of appeal on diagnosis of pneumoconiosis was also introduced. Audiology services were developed, Hearing Therapists were introduced, and the Blind Person's tax allowance was increased.

Improvements were made to the wheel-chair service, while further parking concessions were made for all ‘Orange Badge’ holders. In addition, the ‘Orange Badge’ scheme was extended to include the blind, and concessions to ‘Orange Badge’ holders at most tolled crossings were introduced. The petrol allowance was also restored and doubled for drivers of government-supplied invalid vehicles. Another measure was the extension of exemption from Road Tax (vehicle excise duty) to Mobility Allowance beneficiaries or their nominees. Concessionary fares for disabled people were introduced, along with a discretionary allowance of up to £160 to disabled students whose disability led to additional expenses in connection with their studies. Improved provision for the needs of disabled people in educational establishments was carried out, and a scheme of grants was made to employers “towards the cost of adaptations to premises or equipment made to enable disabled individuals to obtain, or retain, employment.” The 4th of July 1977 saw the inception of an experimental Job Introduction Scheme “to provide financial assistance enabling certain disabled people to undertake a trial period of employment with an employer, where there is reasonable doubt as to the person’s ability to perform a particular job.” On the 5th of July 1978 a revised and simplified scheme designed to help severely disabled people with their travel-to-work costs was introduced. Increased allowances were paid to people going on employment rehabilitation courses, while under the MSC Special Programme for young people additional opportunities were provided at Employment Rehabilitation Centres for disabled young people. A Release for Training (RFT) scheme was introduced for disabled people already in employment “but experiencing problems which can only be resolved by a period of intensive training.” District Handicap Teams were set up, the War Pensioners’ visiting scheme was extended, and zero rating of VAT was introduced “on aids and appliances for disabled people and also on medical equipment for donation to a hospital for the purpose of treatment or research.” New arrangements were introduced for dental treatment of disabled patients, and special concessionary TV license arrangements were extended for people in old people's homes.

In 1976, a revision to the housing cost control system was introduced by the government for England and Wales to encourage (as noted by one study) “housing authorities and housing associations to provide accommodation for single working people." The Training Opportunities Scheme, under which more than 90,000 people completed their training in 1976 and which catered mainly for people over 19 years old, was extended during 1977 to include provisions for training persons for self-employment. In addition, technician training was extended and the network of skillcentres continued to expand. In August 1977, a scheme for voluntary early retirement was introduced in the coal industry for men aged 62+ with at least twenty years of underground service, with weekly payments up to normal pensionable age. In January 1977, unions became authorized to lodge a claim on behalf of workers with the Advisory, Conciliation and Arbitration Service for an improvement in terms and conditions of employment on the grounds that existing terms and conditions were less favourable than the relevant recognized terms and conditions for the trade in the area or, where these did not exist, the general level. In February, sections of the Employment Act 1975 were brought into operation dealing with the qualifying hours for part-time work, thereby entitling large numbers of part-time workers to the same rights and job security as full-time workers. Also in February, employees became entitled to receive guarantee payments from their employers when laid off or on short time, while in April sections of the 1975 Employment Act were activated giving employees the right to paid time off work in order to perform certain public duties. The main provisions of the Race Relations Act 1976 came into force in June 1977, making it unlawful for an employer to discriminate in recruitment or dismissal or in the treatment of existing employees in matters of promotion, transfer, training or other benefits on the grounds of nationality, race, colour, colour, or ethnic or national origins. A Commission for Racial Equality was established to work towards the elimination of discrimination the promotion of equality of opportunity, and good relations between persons of different racial groups. The Safety Representatives and Committees Regulations of 1977 made provision for recognised trade unions to appoint health and safety representatives "and gave such representatives rights to representation and consultation on health and safety as well as rights to access to training and facilities to support them in undertaking these tasks." The Homes Insulation Act 1978 provided for grants to occupiers towards the cost of thermal insulation of their dwellings, while under the Safety Representatives and Safety Committees Regulations recognized trade unions were allowed to appoint safety representatives who would have certain rights and functions. As part of an extension in external consultation on the prevention of industrial accidents and occupationally induced diseases the Health and Safety Commission established three Industry Advisory Committees for construction, railways and oil and regulations were issued in March 1978 dealing with the packaging and labelling of some 800 dangerous chemicals commonly used at work and in the home. Improvements to the Mineworkers Sick Pay Scheme were also introduced from 1978, with improvement in the formula for calculating benefit improved and the period of 'waiting days' reduced from seven to three. The Rating (Disabled Persons) Act 1978 provided rate relief (as noted by one study) “to people whose property has had to be adapted for them because of physical handicap.”

A shift of emphasis in housing policy towards housing rehabilitation was evident in the further increase in the number of General Improvement Areas and the number of Housing Action Areas declared. An Act of March 1977 makes provision, for a limited period, for benefits to be paid from the age of 64 to workers who agree to retire in order to free jobs for young unemployed people, in response to the rise of youth unemployment. A number of other improvements were introduced in 1977, with Attendance Allowances extended to cover disabled foster children and non-contributory disablement pensions extended to married women whose invalidity prevented them from carrying out their household tasks. In January 1977, regulations were issued which brought about a change in the administration of legislation governing fire precautions at places of work. Under these regulations the Health and Safety Executive retained full responsibility for fire safety in certain 'special' premises such as nuclear installations, coalmines and chemical plants, whereas responsibility for general fire precautions at places of work was transferred to local fire authorities. The 1979 Credit Unions Act, the last piece of legislation passed by the Labour government, set up a legal structure for credit unions.

=== Fate ===
The government came under fire from the British public in November 1977, when the Fire Brigades Union called its first national strike, in response to the government's refusal to grant firefighters a 30% pay rise. The strike lasted until after Christmas, and for its duration, Britain's fire services were operated by hastily trained army troops, whose Green Goddess vehicles dated from the 1950s and were considerably slower than the fire engines of the 1970s, and the troops lacked the breathing equipment available to fire brigades. Well over 100 people died in fires during the strike, with the worst tragedy occurring in Wednesbury, where four children died in a house fire.

The union strikes affected Britain during the Winter of Discontent (1978–1979) as public services ground to a halt. Furthermore, inflation was back in double digits. The House of Commons passed a vote of no confidence in late March 1979, by one vote. That vote necessitated a general election, which the Conservatives won decisively even though polls showed Callaghan was personally more popular with the voters than Conservative leader Margaret Thatcher. The problem was that many Labour voters swung away from Labour.

Callaghan continued to lead Labour in opposition for eighteen months; his friendliest biographers take a negative view of the period. He stepped down to make way for Michael Foot, the leader of the leftist faction. Callaghan remained in parliament as an MP until 1987, having served in parliament for 42 years.

Historians Alan Sked and Chris Cook have summarized the views of some historians regarding Labour in power in 1974–1979:

If Wilson's record as Prime Minister was soon felt to have been one of failure, that sense of failure was powerfully reinforced by Callaghan's term as premier. Labour, it seemed, was incapable of positive achievements. It was unable to control inflation, unable to control the unions, unable to solve the Irish problem, unable to solve the Rhodesian question, unable to secure its proposals for Welsh and Scottish devolution, unable to reach a popular modus vivendi with the Common Market, unable even to maintain itself in power until it could go to the country and the date of its own choosing. It was little wonder, therefore, that Mrs. Thatcher resoundingly defeated it in 1979.

Historian Kenneth O. Morgan states:

The fall of James Callaghan in the summer of 1979 meant, according to most commentators across the political spectrum, the end of an ancien régime, a system of corporatism, Keynesian spending programmes, subsidised welfare, and trade union power.

However, Alan Bailey in his 2013 article for the Institute for Public Policy Research Progressive Policy Think Tank entitled: "Not all 'the bad old days': Revisiting Labour's 1970s industrial strategy" gives an alternative reading.

The 'industrial strategy' of the 1974-79 Labour government has had a bad press. It is remembered, if at all, as a failed combination of left-wing Bennite extremism (planning agreements) and 'picking winners' (British Leyland). However, this caricature is unfair and misleading, and there are still lessons to be learned.

== Cabinets ==
=== Wilson ministry ===
Wilson ministries
- Cabinet of the United Kingdom
- March – October 1974; 1974–1976
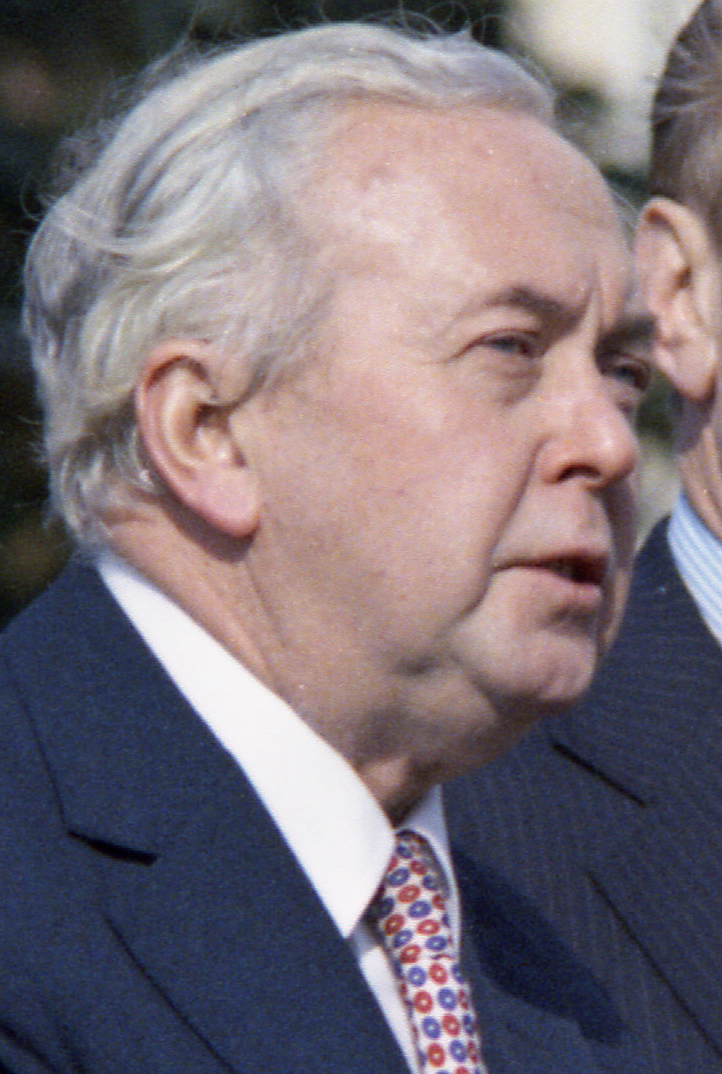
- Wilson in 1975
- Date formed: Third: 4 March 1974; Fourth: 10 October 1974
- Date dissolved: Third: 10 October 1974; Fourth: 5 April 1976

People and organisations
- Monarch: Elizabeth II
- Prime Minister: Harold Wilson
- Prime Minister's history: 1974–1976
- Deputy Prime Minister: (Note: Edward Short never acquired the title of Deputy Prime Minister of the United Kingdom. He did however serve as Deputy Leader of the Labour Party.)
- Member party: Labour Party
- Status in legislature: Minority (1974) with dependent on Liberal support; Majority (1974–1976)
- Opposition cabinet: Heath Shadow Cabinet; Thatcher Shadow Cabinet
- Opposition party: Conservative Party
- Opposition leader: Edward Heath (1974–1975); Margaret Thatcher (1975–1976)

History
- Elections: February 1974 general election; October 1974 general election
- Legislature terms: 46th UK Parliament; 47th UK Parliament
- Predecessor: Heath ministry
- Successor: Callaghan ministry

Office	Name	Term
Prime Minister; First Lord of the Treasury; Minister for the Civil Service	Harold Wilson	1974–1976
Chancellor of the Exchequer	Denis Healey	1974–1976
Lord High Chancellor of Great Britain	Elwyn Jones, Baron Elwyn-Jones	1974–1976
Leader of the House of Commons; Lord President of the Council	Edward Short	1974–1976
Leader of the House of Lords; Lord Keeper of the Privy Seal	Malcolm Shepherd, 2nd Baron Shepherd	1974–1976
Foreign Secretary	James Callaghan	1974–1976
Home Secretary	Roy Jenkins	1974–1976
Secretary of State for Defence	Roy Mason	1974–1976
Secretary of State for Education and Science	Reg Prentice	1974–1975
Secretary of State for Education and Science	Fred Mulley	1975–1976
Secretary of State for Employment	Michael Foot	1974–1976
Secretary of State for Energy	Eric Varley	1974–1975
Secretary of State for Energy	Tony Benn	1975–1976
Secretary of State for the Environment	Anthony Crosland	1974–1976
Secretary of State for Social Services	Barbara Castle	1974–1976
Secretary of State for Industry	Tony Benn	1974–1975
Secretary of State for Industry	Eric Varley	1975–1976
Minister for Overseas Development	Reg Prentice	1975–1976
Secretary of State for Prices and Consumer Protection	Shirley Williams	1974–1976
Secretary of State for Trade; President of the Board of Trade	Peter Shore	1974–1976
Secretary of State for Scotland	William Ross	1974–1976
Secretary of State for Wales	John Morris	1974–1976
Secretary of State for Northern Ireland	Merlyn Rees	1974–1976
Chancellor of the Duchy of Lancaster	Harold Lever	1974–1976
Parliamentary Secretary to the Treasury	Robert Mellish	1974–1976
Minister of Agriculture, Fisheries and Food	Fred Peart	1974–1976
Minister for Planning and Local Government	John Silkin	1974–1976

=== Callaghan ministry ===
Callaghan ministry
- Cabinet of the United Kingdom
- 1976–1979
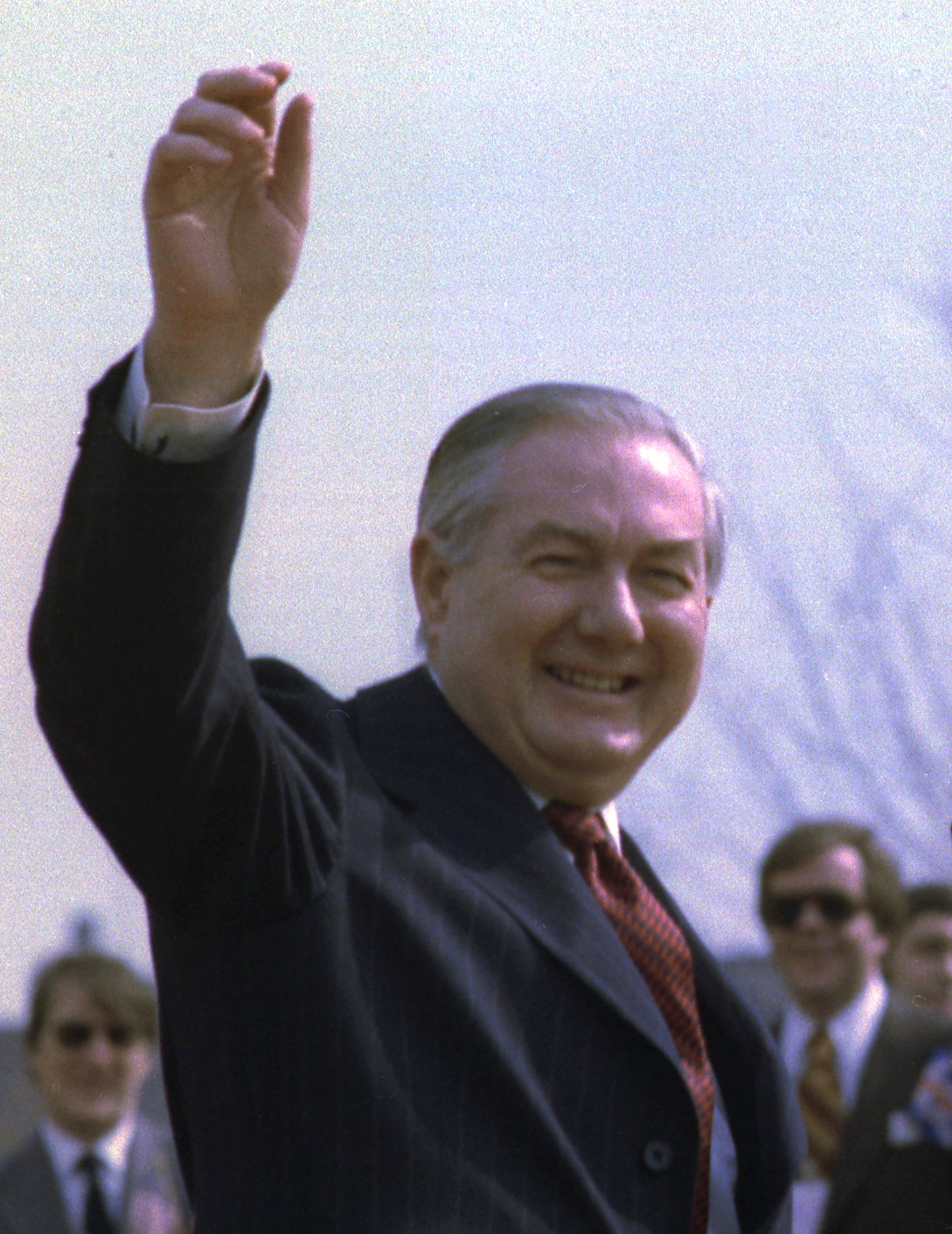
- Callaghan in 1977
- Date formed: 5 April 1976
- Date dissolved: 4 May 1979

People and organisations
- Monarch: Elizabeth II
- Prime Minister: James Callaghan
- Prime Minister's history: 1976–1979
- Deputy Prime Minister: (Note: Neither Edward Short nor Michael Foot acquired the title of Deputy Prime Minister of the United Kingdom. They did however serve as Deputy Leader of the Labour Party respectively.)
- Member party: Labour Party
- Status in legislature: Majority (1976–1977); Minority (1977–1979) with Liberal confidence & supply
- Opposition cabinet: Thatcher Shadow Cabinet
- Opposition party: Conservative Party
- Opposition leader: Margaret Thatcher

History
- Outgoing election: 1979 general election
- Legislature terms: 47th UK Parliament lost a vote of confidence
- Budgets: 1977 budget; 1978 budget; April 1979 budget
- Predecessor: Third Wilson ministry
- Successor: First Thatcher ministry

Office	Name	Term
Prime Minister; First Lord of the Treasury; Minister for the Civil Service	James Callaghan	1976–1979
Chancellor of the Exchequer	Denis Healey	1976–1979
Lord High Chancellor of Great Britain	Elwyn Jones, Baron Elwyn-Jones	1976–1979
Leader of the House of Commons; Lord President of the Council	Michael Foot	1976–1979
Leader of the House of Lords; Lord Keeper of the Privy Seal	Malcolm Shepherd, 2nd Baron Shepherd	1976
Leader of the House of Lords; Lord Keeper of the Privy Seal	Fred Peart, Baron Peart	1976–1979
Foreign Secretary	Anthony Crosland	1976–1977
Foreign Secretary	David Owen	1977–1979
Home Secretary	Roy Jenkins	1976
Home Secretary	Merlyn Rees	1976–1979
Secretary of State for Defence	Roy Mason	1976
Secretary of State for Defence	Fred Mulley	1976–1979
Secretary of State for Education and Science	Fred Mulley	1976
Secretary of State for Education and Science	Shirley Williams	1976–1979
Secretary of State for Employment	Albert Booth	1976–1979
Secretary of State for Energy	Tony Benn	1976–1979
Secretary of State for the Environment	Peter Shore	1976–1979
Secretary of State for Social Services	David Ennals	1976–1979
Secretary of State for Industry	Eric Varley	1976–1979
Minister for Overseas Development	Reg Prentice	1976
Secretary of State for Prices and Consumer Protection	Shirley Williams	1976
Secretary of State for Prices and Consumer Protection	Roy Hattersley	1976–1979
Secretary of State for Trade; President of the Board of Trade	Edmund Dell	1976–1978
Secretary of State for Trade; President of the Board of Trade	John Smith	1978–1979
Secretary of State for Transport	Bill Rodgers	1976–1979
Secretary of State for Scotland	Bruce Millan	1976–1979
Secretary of State for Wales	John Morris	1976–1979
Secretary of State for Northern Ireland	Merlyn Rees	1976
Secretary of State for Northern Ireland	Roy Mason	1976–1979
Chancellor of the Duchy of Lancaster	Harold Lever	1976–1979
Chief Secretary to the Treasury	Joel Barnett	1977–1979
Minister of Agriculture, Fisheries and Food	Fred Peart	1976
Minister of Agriculture, Fisheries and Food	John Silkin	1976–1979
Minister for Social Security	Stan Orme	1976–1979
Minister for Local Government and Planning	John Silkin	1976

== Full list of ministers ==
Members of the Cabinet are in bold face.

Office	Name	Dates	Notes
Prime Minister, First Lord of the Treasury and Minister for the Civil Service	**Harold Wilson**	4 March 1974 – 5 April 1976	
Prime Minister, First Lord of the Treasury and Minister for the Civil Service	**James Callaghan**	5 April 1976 – 4 May 1979	
Minister of State, Civil Service Department	Robert Sheldon	7 March 1974	
Minister of State, Civil Service Department	Charles Morris	18 October 1974	
Parliamentary Secretary, Civil Service Department	John Grant	7 March 1974 – 18 October 1974	
Lord Chancellor	**Elwyn Jones, Baron Elwyn-Jones**	5 March 1974	
Lord President of the Council and Leader of the House of Commons	**Edward Short**	5 March 1974	
Lord President of the Council and Leader of the House of Commons	**Michael Foot**	8 April 1976	
Minister of State for the Privy Council Office	Gerald Fowler	18 October 1974	
Minister of State for the Privy Council Office	Norman Crowther Hunt, Baron Crowther-Hunt	23 January 1976	
Minister of State for the Privy Council Office	John Smith	8 April 1976	
Minister of State for the Privy Council Office	Alma Birk, Baroness Birk	3 January 1979	
Parliamentary Secretary to the Privy Council Office	William Price	18 October 1974	
Lord Privy Seal and Leader of the House of Lords	**Malcolm Shepherd, 2nd Baron Shepherd**	7 March 1974	
Lord Privy Seal and Leader of the House of Lords	**Fred Peart, Baron Peart**	10 September 1976	
Chancellor of the Exchequer	**Denis Healey**	5 March 1974	
Chief Secretary to the Treasury	Joel Barnett	7 March 1974	In Cabinet from Feb 1977
Parliamentary Secretary to the Treasury	**Robert Mellish**	5 March 1974	
Parliamentary Secretary to the Treasury	Michael Cocks	8 April 1976	
Financial Secretary to the Treasury	John Gilbert	7 March 1974	
Financial Secretary to the Treasury	Robert Sheldon	17 June 1975	
Minister of State for Treasury	Robert Sheldon	18 October 1974	
Minister of State for Treasury	Denzil Davies	17 June 1975	
Lords of the Treasury	Donald Coleman	8 March 1974 – 6 July 1978	
Lords of the Treasury	James Dunn	8 March 1974 – 14 April 1976	
Lords of the Treasury	John Golding	8 March 1974 – 18 October 1974	
Lords of the Treasury	Tom Pendry	8 March 1974 – 18 January 1977	
Lords of the Treasury	James Hamilton	8 March 1974 – 28 June 1974	
Lords of the Treasury	Michael Cocks	28 June 1974 – 8 April 1976	
Lords of the Treasury	Jack Dormand	18 October 1974 – 4 May 1979	
Lords of the Treasury	David Stoddart	4 April 1976 – 18 November 1977	
Lords of the Treasury	Edward Graham	14 April 1976 – 4 May 1979	
Lords of the Treasury	Tom Cox	19 January 1977 – 4 May 1979	
Lords of the Treasury	Peter Snape	23 November 1977 – 4 May 1979	
Lords of the Treasury	Albert Stallard	5 July 1978 – 17 January 1979	
Lords of the Treasury	Alfred Bates	17 January 1979 – 4 May 1979	
Assistant Whips	Michael Cocks	March 1974 - June 1974	
Assistant Whips	Tom Cox	March 1974 - 19 January 1977	
Assistant Whips	Jack Dormand	March 1974 - 18 October 1974	
Assistant Whips	Laurence Pavitt	March 1974 - 1976	
Assistant Whips	Ernest Perry	March 1974 - 1975	
Assistant Whips	John Ellis	1974 - 1976	
Assistant Whips	Betty Boothroyd	24 October 1974 - 4 November 1975	
Assistant Whips	Margaret Beckett (Jackson)	January 1975 - January 1976	
Assistant Whips	David Stoddart	27 January 1975 - 4 April 1976	
Assistant Whips	Peter Snape	1 January 1975 - 1 January 1977	
Assistant Whips	Albert Stallard	1976 - 5 July 1978	
Assistant Whips	Alfred Bates	1976 - 17 January 1979	
Assistant Whips	Frank White	14 April 1976 - 31 October 1978	
Assistant Whips	James Tinn	16 June 1976 - 4 May 1979	
Foreign Secretary	**James Callaghan**	5 March 1974	
Foreign Secretary	**Anthony Crosland**	8 April 1976	
Foreign Secretary	**David Owen**	21 February 1977	
Minister of State for Foreign and Commonwealth Affairs	David Ennals	7 March 1974 – 8 April 1976	
Minister of State for Foreign and Commonwealth Affairs	Roy Hattersley	7 March 1974 – 10 September 1976	
Minister of State for Foreign and Commonwealth Affairs	Goronwy Roberts, Baron Goronwy-Roberts	4 December 1975 – 4 May 1979	
Minister of State for Foreign and Commonwealth Affairs	Ted Rowlands	14 April 1976 – 4 May 1979	
Minister of State for Foreign and Commonwealth Affairs	David Owen	10 September 1976 – 21 February 1977	
Minister of State for Foreign and Commonwealth Affairs	Frank Judd	21 February 1977 – 4 May 1979	
Under-Secretary of State for Foreign and Commonwealth Affairs	Joan Lestor	8 March 1974 – 12 June 1975	
Under-Secretary of State for Foreign and Commonwealth Affairs	Goronwy Roberts, Baron Goronwy-Roberts	8 March 1974 – 4 December 1975	
Under-Secretary of State for Foreign and Commonwealth Affairs	Ted Rowlands	12 June 1975 – 14 April 1976	
Under-Secretary of State for Foreign and Commonwealth Affairs	John Tomlinson	17 March 1976 – 4 May 1979	Also Overseas Development
Under-Secretary of State for Foreign and Commonwealth Affairs	Evan Luard	14 April 1976 – 4 May 1979	
Minister for Overseas Development	Judith Hart	7 April 1974	Subordinated to Foreign and Commonwealth Affairs 10 June 1975
Minister of Overseas Development	**Reg Prentice**	10 June 1975	
Minister of Overseas Development	Frank Judd	21 December 1976	
Minister of Overseas Development	Judith Hart	21 February 1977	
Parliamentary Secretary to the Ministry of Overseas Development	William Price	11 March 1974	
Parliamentary Secretary to the Ministry of Overseas Development	John Grant	18 October 1974	
Parliamentary Secretary to the Ministry of Overseas Development	Frank Judd	14 April 1976	
Parliamentary Secretary to the Ministry of Overseas Development	John Tomlinson	3 January 1977	
Home Secretary	**Roy Jenkins**	5 March 1974	
Home Secretary	**Merlyn Rees**	10 September 1976	
Minister of State for Home Affairs	John Harris, Baron Harris of Greenwich	8 March 1974 – 3 January 1979	
Minister of State for Home Affairs	Alex Lyon	8 March 1974 – 14 April 1976	
Minister of State for Home Affairs	Brynmor John	14 April 1976 – 4 May 1979	
Minister of State for Home Affairs	Terence Boston, Baron Boston of Faversham	3 January 1979 – 4 May 1979	
Under-Secretary of State for Home Affairs	Shirley Summerskill	8 March 1974	
Minister of Agriculture, Fisheries and Food	**Fred Peart**	5 March 1974	
Minister of Agriculture, Fisheries and Food	**John Silkin**	10 September 1976	
Minister of State for Agriculture, Fisheries and Food	Norman Buchan	8 March 1974	
Minister of State for Agriculture, Fisheries and Food	Edward Stanley Bishop	18 October 1974	
Parliamentary Secretary to Agriculture, Fisheries and Food	Roland Moyle	11 March 1974	
Parliamentary Secretary to Agriculture, Fisheries and Food	Edward Stanley Bishop	28 June 1974	
Parliamentary Secretary to Agriculture, Fisheries and Food	Gavin Strang	18 October 1974	
Secretary of State for Defence	**Roy Mason**	4 March 1974	
Secretary of State for Defence	**Frederick Mulley**	10 September 1976	
Minister of State for Defence	William Rodgers	4 March 1974	
Minister of State for Defence	John Gilbert	10 September 1976	
Under-Secretary of State for the Navy	Frank Judd	8 March 1974	
Under-Secretary of State for the Navy	Patrick Duffy	14 April 1976	
Under-Secretary of State for the Air Force	Brynmor John	8 March 1974	
Under-Secretary of State for the Air Force	James Wellbeloved	14 April 1976	
Under-Secretary of State for the Army	Desmond Brayley	4 March 1974	
Under-Secretary of State for the Army	Robert Brown	18 October 1974	
Secretary of State for Education and Science	**Reginald Prentice**	5 March 1974	
Secretary of State for Education and Science	**Frederick Mulley**	10 June 1975	
Secretary of State for Education and Science	**Shirley Williams**	10 September 1976	
Minister of State, Education and Science	Gerald Fowler	8 March 1974	
Minister of State, Education and Science	Norman Crowther Hunt	18 October 1974	
Minister of State, Education and Science	Gerald Fowler	23 January 1976	
Minister of State, Education and Science	Gordon Oakes	10 September 1976	
Under-Secretary of State, Education and Science	Ernest Armstrong	7 March 1974	
Under-Secretary of State, Education and Science	Joan Lestor	12 June 1975	
Under-Secretary of State, Education and Science	Margaret Jackson	12 March 1976	
Secretary of State for Employment	**Michael Foot**	5 March 1974	
Secretary of State for Employment	**Albert Booth**	8 April 1976	
Minister of State, Employment	Albert Booth	8 March 1976	
Minister of State, Employment	Harold Walker	14 April 1976	
Under-Secretary of State, Employment	John Fraser	8 March 1974 – 14 April 1976	
Under-Secretary of State, Employment	Harold Walker	8 March 1974 – 14 April 1976	
Under-Secretary of State, Employment	John Golding	14 April 1976 – 4 May 1979	
Under-Secretary of State, Employment	John Grant	14 April 1976 – 4 May 1979	
Secretary of State for Energy	**Eric Varley**	5 March 1974	
Secretary of State for Energy	**Tony Benn**	10 May 1975	
Minister of State, Energy	Thomas Balogh	7 March 1974	
Minister of State, Energy	John Smith	4 December 1975	
Minister of State, Energy	Dickson Mabon	14 April 1976	
Under-Secretary of State, Energy	Gavin Strang	7 March 1974 – 18 October 1974	
Under-Secretary of State, Energy	Alex Eadie	7 March 1974 – 4 May 1979	
Under-Secretary of State, Energy	John Smith	18 October 1974 – 4 December 1975	
Under-Secretary of State, Energy	Peter Lovell-Davis, Baron Lovell-Davis	4 December 1975 – 14 April 1976	
Under-Secretary of State, Energy	Gordon Oakes	14 April 1976 – 10 September 1976	
Under-Secretary of State, Energy	Jack Cunningham	10 September 1976 – 4 May 1979	
Secretary of State for the Environment	**Anthony Crosland**	5 March 1974	
Secretary of State for the Environment	**Peter Shore**	8 April 1976	
Minister of State, Urban Affairs	Charles Morris	7 March 1974 – 18 October 1974	
Minister of State (Sport, Recreation and Water Resources)	Denis Howell	7 March 1974 – 4 May 1979	
Under-Secretary of State, Environment	Gerald Kaufman	8 March 1974 – 12 June 1975	
Under-Secretary of State, Environment	Neil Carmichael	8 March 1974 – 4 December 1975	
Under-Secretary of State, Environment	Gordon Oakes	8 March 1974 – 14 April 1976	
Under-Secretary of State, Environment	Alma Birk	18 October 1974 – 3 January 1979	
Under-Secretary of State, Environment	Ernest Armstrong	12 June 1975 – 4 May 1979	
Under-Secretary of State, Environment	Guy Barnett	5 December 1975 – 4 May 1979	
Under-Secretary of State, Environment	Kenneth Marks	14 April 1976 – 4 May 1979	
Under-Secretary of State, Environment	Phyllis Stedman	3 January 1979 – 4 May 1979	
Minister for Planning and Local Government	John Silkin	7 March 1974	In Cabinet from 18 October 1974. Office abolished 10 September 1976
Minister for Transport	Fred Mulley	7 March 1974	
Minister for Transport	John Gilbert	12 June 1975	Separate department and Cabinet Minister from 10 September 1976
Minister for Housing and Construction	Reg Freeson	7 March 1974	
Secretary of State for Social Services	**Barbara Castle**	5 March 1974	
Secretary of State for Social Services	**David Ennals**	8 April 1976	
Minister of State, Health and Social Security	Brian O'Malley	8 March 1974 – 6 April 1976	
Minister of State, Health and Social Security	David Owen	26 July 1974 – 10 September 1976	
Minister of State, Health and Social Security	Stan Orme	8 April 1976 – 4 May 1979	In Cabinet as Minister for Social Security from 10 September 1976
Minister of State, Health and Social Security	Roland Moyle	10 September 1976 – 4 May 1979	
Under-Secretary of State, Health and Social Security	David Owen	8 March 1974 – 26 July 1974	
Under-Secretary of State, Health and Social Security	Robert Brown	8 March 1974 – 18 October 1974	
Under-Secretary of State, Health and Social Security	Alec Jones	18 October 1974 – 12 June 1975	
Under-Secretary of State, Health and Social Security	Michael Meacher	12 June 1975 – 14 April 1976	
Under-Secretary of State, Health and Social Security	Eric Deakins	14 April 1976 – 4 May 1979	
Under-Secretary of State, Health and Social Security	Reginald Wells-Pestell, Baron Wells-Pestell	3 January 1979 – 4 May 1979	
Under-Secretary of State, Disabled Industry	Alf Morris	11 March 1974 – 4 May 1979	
Secretary of State for Industry	**Tony Benn**	5 March 1974	Also Minister for Posts and Telecommunications 7–29 March 1974
Secretary of State for Industry	**Eric Varley**	10 June 1975	
Minister of State, Industry	Eric Heffer	7 March 1974 – 9 April 1975	
Minister of State, Industry	Frank Beswick, Baron Beswick	11 March 1974 – 4 December 1975	
Minister of State, Industry	Gerald Kaufman	4 December 1975 – 14 April 1976	
Minister of State, Industry	Alan Williams	14 April 1976 – 4 May 1979	
Under-Secretary of State, Industry	Gregor Mackenzie	7 March 1974 – 10 June 1975	
Under-Secretary of State, Industry	Michael Meacher	7 March 1974 – 12 June 1975	
Under-Secretary of State, Industry	Gerald Kaufman	12 June 1975 – 4 December 1975	
Under-Secretary of State, Industry	Peter Mond, 4th Baron Melchett	4 December 1975 – 10 September 1976	
Under-Secretary of State, Industry	Neil Carmichael	4 December 1975 – 14 April 1976	
Under-Secretary of State, Industry	Les Huckfield	4 April 1976 – 4 May 1979	
Under-Secretary of State, Industry	Bob Cryer	10 September 1976 – 20 November 1978	
Chancellor of the Duchy of Lancaster	**Harold Lever**	5 March 1974	
Secretary of State for Northern Ireland	**Merlyn Rees**	5 March 1974	
Secretary of State for Northern Ireland	**Roy Mason**	10 September 1976	
Minister of State, Northern Ireland	Stan Orme	7 March 1974 – 8 April 1976	
Minister of State, Northern Ireland	Roland Moyle	27 June 1974 – 10 September 1976	
Minister of State, Northern Ireland	Don Concannon	14 April 1976 – 4 May 1979	
Minister of State, Northern Ireland	Peter Mond, 4th Baron Melchett	10 September 1976 – 4 May 1979	
Under-Secretary of State, Northern Ireland	Jack Donaldson, Baron Donaldson of Kingsbridge	4 March 1974 – 5 April 1976	
Under-Secretary of State, Northern Ireland	Don Concannon	27 June 1974 – 5 April 1976	
Under-Secretary of State, Northern Ireland	James Dunn	5 April 1976 – 4 May 1979	
Under-Secretary of State, Northern Ireland	Raymond Carter	5 April 1976 – 4 May 1979	
Under-Secretary of State, Northern Ireland	Tom Pendry	11 November 1978 – 4 May 1979	
Paymaster General	Edmund Dell	7 March 1974	
Paymaster General	**Shirley Williams**	5 April 1976	
Secretary of State for Prices and Consumer Protection	**Shirley Williams**	4 March 1974	
Secretary of State for Prices and Consumer Protection	**Roy Hattersley**	10 September 1976	
Minister of State, Prices and Consumer Protection	Alan Williams	4 March 1974	
Minister of State, Prices and Consumer Protection	John Fraser	5 April 1976	
Under-Secretary of State, Prices and Consumer Protection	Robert Maclennan	4 March 1974	
Secretary of State for Scotland	**William Ross**	4 March 1974	
Secretary of State for Scotland	**Bruce Millan**	5 April 1976	
Minister of State for Scotland	Bruce Millan	4 March 1974 – 5 April 1976	
Minister of State for Scotland	William Hughes, Baron Hughes	4 March 1974 – 8 August 1975	
Minister of State for Scotland	John Smith, Baron Kirkhill	8 August 1975 – 15 December 1978	
Minister of State for Scotland	Gregor Mackenzie	5 April 1976 – 4 May 1979	
Under-Secretary of State for Scotland	Robert Hughes	4 March 1974 – 22 July 1975	
Under-Secretary of State for Scotland	Hugh Brown	27 June 1974 – 4 May 1979	
Under-Secretary of State for Scotland	Harry Ewing	18 October 1974 – 4 May 1979	
Under-Secretary of State for Scotland	Frank McElhone	22 July 1975 – 4 May 1979	
Secretary of State for Trade	**Peter Shore**	4 March 1974	
Secretary of State for Trade	**Edmund Dell**	5 April 1976	
Secretary of State for Trade	**John Smith**	11 November 1978	
Under-Secretary of State for Trade	Eric Deakins	4 March 1974 – 5 April 1976	
Under-Secretary of State for Trade	Clinton Davis	4 March 1974 – 4 May 1979	
Under-Secretary of State for Trade	Michael Meacher	5 April 1976 – 4 May 1979	
Secretary of State for Transport	**William Rodgers**	10 September 1976	
Under-Secretary of State for Transport	John Horam	10 September 1976	
Secretary of State for Wales	**John Morris**	4 March 1974	
Under-Secretary of State for Wales	Ted Rowlands	4 March 1974 – 12 June 1975	
Under-Secretary of State for Wales	Barry Jones	4 March 1974 – 4 May 1979	
Under-Secretary of State for Wales	Alec Jones	12 June 1975 – 4 May 1979	
Attorney General	Samuel Silkin	4 March 1974	
Solicitor General	Peter Archer	4 March 1974	
Parliamentary Secretary to the Law Officers	Arthur Davidson	4 March 1974	
Lord Advocate	Ronald King Murray	4 March 1974	
Solicitor General for Scotland	John McCluskey	4 March 1974	
Treasurer of the Household	Walter Harrison	4 March 1974	
Comptroller of the Household	Joseph Harper	4 March 1974	
Comptroller of the Household	James Hamilton	6 July 1978	
Vice-Chamberlain of the Household	Don Concannon	4 March 1974	
Vice-Chamberlain of the Household	James Hamilton	27 June 1974	
Vice-Chamberlain of the Household	Donald Coleman	6 July 1978	
Captain of the Gentlemen at Arms	Annie Llewelyn-Davies, Baroness Llewelyn-Davies of Hastoe	4 March 1974	
Captain of the Yeomen of the Guard	David Kenworthy, 11th Baron Strabolgi	4 March 1974	
Lords-in-Waiting	John Jacques, Baron Jacques	4 March 1974 – 19 January 1977, 11 January 1979 – 4 May 1979	
Lords-in-Waiting	Charles Garnsworthy, Baron Garnsworthy	4 March 1974 – 4 September 1974	
Lords-in-Waiting	Alma Birk, Baroness Birk	4 March 1974 – 18 October 1974	
Lords-in-Waiting	Reginald Wells-Pestell, Baron Wells-Pestell	4 March 1974 – 11 January 1979	
Lords-in-Waiting	Ian Winterbottom, Baron Winterbottom	18 October 1974 – 27 October 1978	
Lords-in-Waiting	Peter Lovell-Davis, Baron Lovell-Davis	18 October 1974 – 4 December 1975	
Lords-in-Waiting	Peter Mond, 4th Baron Melchett	18 October 1974 – 4 December 1975	
Lords-in-Waiting	Phyllis Stedman, Baroness Stedman	4 December 1975 – 11 January 1979	
Lords-in-Waiting	Albert Oram, Baron Oram	23 January 1976 – 23 March 1978	
Lords-in-Waiting	George Wallace, Baron Wallace of Coslany	19 January 1977 – 4 May 1979	
Lords-in-Waiting	John Leonard, Baron Leonard	27 October 1978 – 4 May 1979	
Lords-in-Waiting	Nora David, Baroness David	27 October 1978 – 4 May 1979	

Preceded by Heath ministry	Government of the United Kingdom; 1974–1979	Succeeded by First Thatcher ministry
