= Heath ministry =

Premiership of Edward Heath

- Cabinet of the United Kingdom
- 1970 – 1974
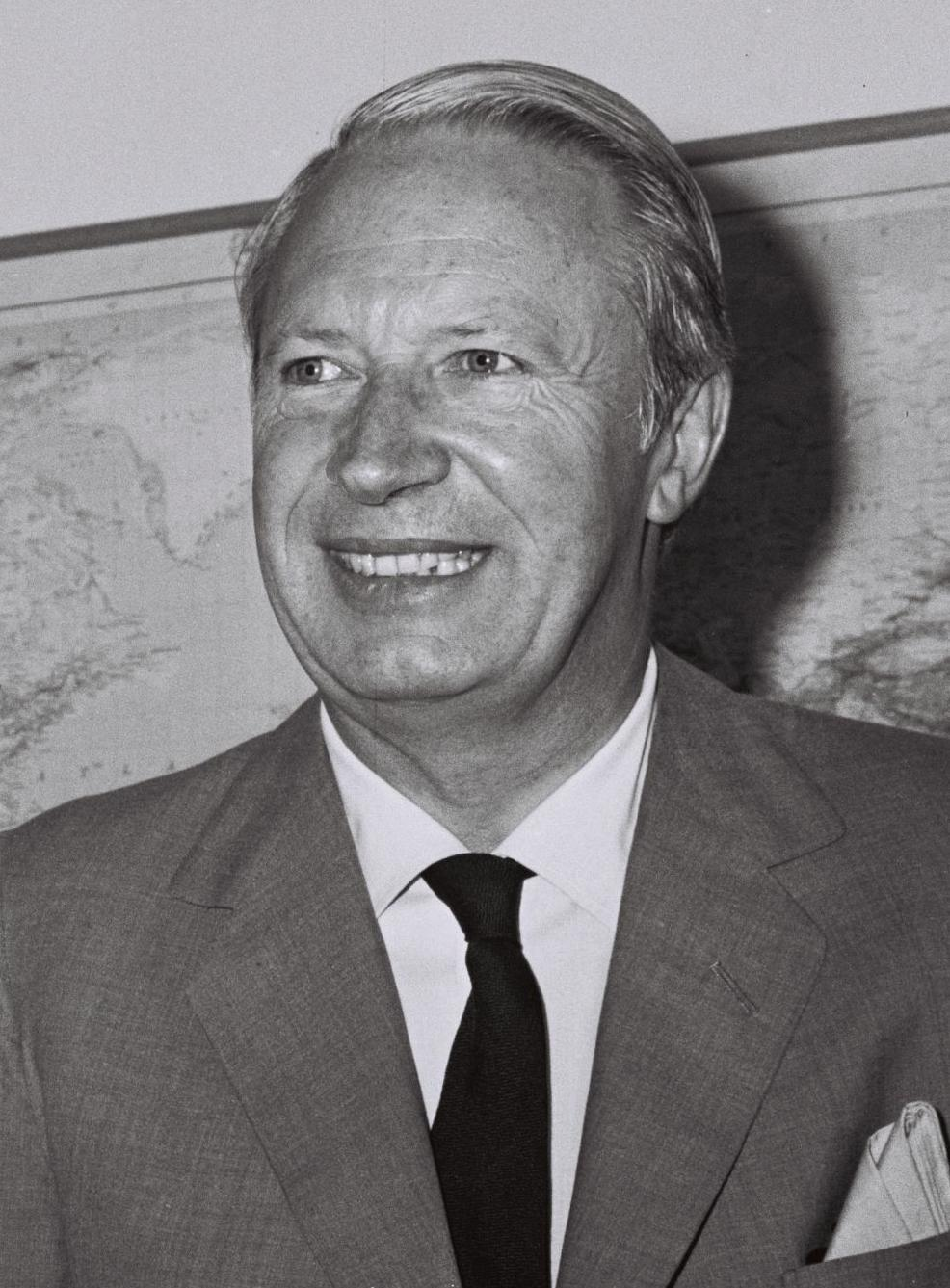
- Heath in 1969
- Date formed: 19 June 1970
- Date dissolved: 4 March 1974

People and organisations
- Monarch: Elizabeth II
- Prime Minister: Edward Heath
- Prime Minister's history: 1970–1974
- Deputy Prime Minister: (Note: Reginald Maudling never acquired the title of Deputy Prime Minister of the United Kingdom. He served as Deputy Leader of the Conservative Party up to 1972.)
- Total no. of members: 211 appointments
- Member party: Conservative Party
- Status in legislature: Majority (1970–1974); Caretaker (March 1974)
- Opposition cabinet: Wilson Shadow Cabinet
- Opposition party: Labour Party
- Opposition leader: Harold Wilson

History
- Election: 1970 general election
- Outgoing election: 1974 general election
- Legislature terms: 45th UK Parliament
- Predecessor: Second Wilson ministry
- Successor: Third Wilson ministry

Edward Heath of the Conservative Party formed the Heath ministry and was appointed Prime Minister of the United Kingdom by Queen Elizabeth II on 19 June 1970, following the general election of the previous day. The Heath ministry ended after the February 1974 general election, which produced a hung parliament, leading to the formation of a minority government by Harold Wilson of the Labour Party.

Heath had been elected Leader of the Conservative Party in 1965 – succeeding Alec Douglas-Home – within a few months of the party's election defeat after 13 years in government. In the following year, his first general election as Leader resulted in defeat as Wilson's Labour government increased its majority. The Conservatives enjoyed a surge in support over the next two years as the British economy went through a period of deflation that culminated in a devaluation, at the same time that the merging of businesses was encouraged. Unemployment rose significantly, but when Wilson called a general election for June 1970, the opinion polls all pointed towards a third successive Labour victory. It was a major surprise when the Conservatives won with a majority of 30 seats.

Heath's government initially enjoyed a strong economy and relatively low unemployment, and on 1 January 1973 the United Kingdom became a member state of the European Communities, principally the European Economic Community. But then came the 1973 oil crisis, and just before Christmas, Heath declared a three-day week in which the use of offices, factories and most public buildings was reduced to three days a week. He also faced a battle with the unions over pay freezes and restraints, which sparked a rise in strikes. The economy also entered a recession.

Historians have suggested the Heath government promoted both the old ways of the post-war consensus along with a new outlook of economic policies and monetarism. The premiership was trapped between these two paradigms as the 'old world' started to fail and the 'new world' lacked intellectual credibility and political backing.

Heath's response in February 1974 was to call a general election, urging the voters to decide the question of whether Britain was to be run by the government or by the unions. In the election on 28 February the Conservatives received the most votes, but in the resulting hung parliament Labour had the most seats. After Conservative talks with the Liberal Party about forming a coalition government failed, Labour formed a minority government on 4 March. A second general election was widely anticipated later in 1974, and was called by Harold Wilson for 10 October, in which the Labour Party secured a three-seat majority. This meant that Wilson had now won four of the five general elections he had contested, while Heath had now lost three of his four general elections, and it seemed inevitable that his leadership would soon end.

== Cabinet ==
=== June 1970 – March 1974 ===
The cabinet appointed in June 1970 comprised the following:

- Prime Minister: Edward Heath
- Lord High Chancellor of Great Britain: Quintin Hogg, Baron Hailsham of St Marylebone
- Leader of the House of Commons and Lord President of the Council: William Whitelaw
- Leader of the House of Lords and Lord Keeper of the Privy Seal: George Jellicoe, 2nd Earl Jellicoe
- Chancellor of the Exchequer: Iain Macleod
- Foreign Secretary: Alec Douglas-Home
- Home Secretary: Reginald Maudling
- Secretary of State for Defence: Peter Carington, 6th Baron Carrington
- Minister of Agriculture, Fisheries and Food: Jim Prior
- Secretary of State for Education and Science: Margaret Thatcher
- Secretary of State for Employment: Robert Carr
- Minister of Housing and Local Government: Peter Walker
- Secretary of State for Social Services: Sir Keith Joseph
- Chancellor of the Duchy of Lancaster: Anthony Barber
- Secretary of State for Scotland: Gordon Campbell
- Minister of Technology: Geoffrey Rippon
- President of the Board of Trade: Michael Noble
- Secretary of State for Wales: Peter Thomas

==== Changes ====
- July 1970 – Iain Macleod dies; Anthony Barber succeeds him as Chancellor of the Exchequer. Geoffrey Rippon succeeds Barber as Chancellor of the Duchy of Lancaster. John Davies succeeds Rippon as Minister of Technology.
- October 1970 – The Ministry of Technology and the Board of Trade are merged to become the Department of Trade and Industry. John Davies becomes Secretary of State for Trade and Industry. Michael Noble leaves the cabinet. The Ministry of Housing and Local Government is succeeded by the new Department of the Environment, which is headed by Peter Walker.
- March 1972 – William Whitelaw is appointed to the new position of Secretary of State for Northern Ireland; Robert Carr succeeds him as Lord President and Leader of the House of Commons. Maurice Macmillan succeeds Carr as Secretary for Employment.
- July 1972 – Reginald Maudling resigns as Home Secretary; Robert Carr succeeds him. Jim Prior succeeds Carr as Lord President and Leader of the House of Commons. Joseph Godber succeeds Prior as Secretary for Agriculture.
- November 1972 – Geoffrey Rippon succeeds Peter Walker as Secretary for the Environment. John Davies succeeds Rippon as Chancellor of the Duchy of Lancaster. Peter Walker succeeds Davies as Secretary for Trade and Industry. Geoffrey Howe becomes Minister for Trade and Consumer Affairs with a seat in the cabinet.
- June 1973 – The Earl Jellicoe resigns as Lord Privy Seal and Leader of the House of Lords; The Lord Windlesham succeeds him.
- December 1973 – William Whitelaw succeeds Maurice Macmillan as Secretary for Employment. Francis Pym succeeds Whitelaw as Secretary for Northern Ireland. Macmillan becomes Paymaster-General.
- January 1974 – The Lord Carrington is appointed to the new position of Secretary of State for Energy; Ian Gilmour succeeds him as Secretary for Defence.

== List of ministers ==
Cabinet members are in bold face.

Office	Name	Dates	Notes
Prime Minister, First Lord of the Treasury and Minister for the Civil Service	**Edward Heath**	19 June 1970 – 4 March 1974	
Parliamentary Secretary for the Civil Service Department	David Howell	23 June 1970 – 26 March 1972	
Parliamentary Secretary for the Civil Service Department	Kenneth Baker	7 April 1972 – 4 March 1974	
Parliamentary Secretary for the Civil Service Department	Geoffrey Johnson-Smith	5 November 1972 – 4 March 1974	
Lord High Chancellor of Great Britain	**Quintin Hogg, Baron Hailsham of St Marylebone**	20 June 1970	
Lord President of the Council and Leader of the House of Commons	**William Whitelaw**	20 June 1970	
Lord President of the Council and Leader of the House of Commons	**Robert Carr**	7 April 1972	
Lord President of the Council and Leader of the House of Commons	**Jim Prior**	5 November 1972	
Lord Keeper of the Privy Seal and Leader of the House of Lords	**George Jellicoe, 2nd Earl Jellicoe**	20 June 1970	
Lord Keeper of the Privy Seal and Leader of the House of Lords	**David Hennessy, 3rd Baron Windlesham**	5 June 1973	
Chancellor of the Exchequer	**Iain Macleod**	20 June 1970	Died in office, 20 July 1970
Chancellor of the Exchequer	**Anthony Barber**	25 July 1970	
Chief Secretary to the Treasury	**Maurice Macmillan**	23 June 1970	
Chief Secretary to the Treasury	**Patrick Jenkin**	7 April 1972	
Chief Secretary to the Treasury	**Tom Boardman**	8 January 1974	
Minister of State for Treasury	Terence Higgins	23 June 1970	
Minister of State for Treasury	John Nott	7 April 1972	
Parliamentary Secretary to the Treasury	Francis Pym	20 June 1970	
Parliamentary Secretary to the Treasury	Humphrey Atkins	2 December 1973	
Financial Secretary to the Treasury	Patrick Jenkin	23 June 1970	
Financial Secretary to the Treasury	Terence Higgins	7 April 1972	
Lords of the Treasury	Reginald Eyre	24 June 1970 – 23 September 1970	
Lords of the Treasury	David Howell	24 June 1970 – 6 January 1971	
Lords of the Treasury	Hector Monro	24 June 1970 – 28 July 1971	
Lords of the Treasury	Bernard Weatherill	24 June 1970 – 17 October 1971	
Lords of the Treasury	Walter Clegg	24 June 1970 – 7 April 1972	
Lords of the Treasury	Victor Goodhew	21 October 1970 – 9 October 1973	
Lords of the Treasury	Paul Hawkins	5 January 1971 – 2 December 1973	
Lords of the Treasury	Tim Fortescue	8 November 1971 – 7 April 1972	
Lords of the Treasury	Keith Speed	8 November 1971 – 21 September 1973	
Lords of the Treasury	Hugh Rossi	7 April 1972 – 8 January 1974	
Lords of the Treasury	Oscar Murton	7 April 1972 – 30 October 1973	
Lords of the Treasury	Michael Jopling	30 October 1973 – 4 March 1974	
Lords of the Treasury	Hamish Gray	30 October 1973 – 4 March 1974	
Lords of the Treasury	John Stradling Thomas	30 October 1973 – 4 March 1974	
Lords of the Treasury	Marcus Fox	2 December 1973 – 4 March 1974	
Lords of the Treasury	Kenneth Clarke	8 January 1974 – 4 March 1974	
Foreign Secretary	**Alec Douglas-Home**	20 June 1970	
Minister of State for Foreign and Commonwealth Affairs	Joseph Godber	23 June 1970 – 5 November 1972	
Minister of State for Foreign and Commonwealth Affairs	Richard Wood	15 October 1970 – 4 March 1974	
Minister of State for Foreign and Commonwealth Affairs	Priscilla Buchan, Baroness Tweedsmuir	7 April 1972 – 4 March 1974	
Minister of State for Foreign and Commonwealth Affairs	Julian Amery	5 November 1972 – 4 March 1974	
Minister of State for Foreign and Commonwealth Affairs	Robert Lindsay, Baron Balniel	5 November 1972 – 4 March 1974	
Under-Secretary of State for Foreign and Commonwealth Affairs	Peter Kerr, 12th Marquess of Lothian	24 June 1970 – 7 April 1972	
Under-Secretary of State for Foreign and Commonwealth Affairs	Anthony Royle	24 June 1970 – 8 January 1974	
Under-Secretary of State for Foreign and Commonwealth Affairs	Anthony Kershaw	15 October 1970 – 5 June 1973	
Under-Secretary of State for Foreign and Commonwealth Affairs	Peter Blaker	8 January 1974 – 4 March 1974	
Minister for Overseas Development	Richard Wood	15 October 1970	
Home Secretary	**Reginald Maudling**	20 June 1970	
Home Secretary	**Robert Carr**	18 July 1972	
Minister of State for Home Affairs	Richard Sharples	23 June 1970 – 7 April 1972	
Minister of State for Home Affairs	David Hennessy, 3rd Baron Windlesham	23 June 1970 – 26 March 1972	
Minister of State for Home Affairs	Mark Carlisle	7 April 1972 – 4 March 1974	
Minister of State for Home Affairs	Mark Colville, 4th Viscount Colville of Culross	21 April 1972 – 4 March 1974	
Under-Secretary of State for Home Affairs	Mark Carlisle	24 June 1970	
Under-Secretary of State for Home Affairs	David Lane	7 April 1972	
Minister of Agriculture, Fisheries and Food	**Jim Prior**	20 June 1970	
Minister of Agriculture, Fisheries and Food	Joseph Godber	5 November 1972	
Minister of State for Agriculture, Fisheries and Food	Anthony Stodart	7 April 1972	New post
Parliamentary Secretary to the Ministry of Agriculture, Fisheries and Food	Anthony Stodart	24 June 1970 – 7 April 1972	
Parliamentary Secretary to the Ministry of Agriculture, Fisheries and Food	Peter Mills	7 April 1972 – 5 November 1972	
Parliamentary Secretary to the Ministry of Agriculture, Fisheries and Food	Peggy Fenner	5 November 1972 – 4 March 1974	
Parliamentary Secretary to the Ministry of Agriculture, Fisheries and Food	Robert Washington Shirley, 13th Earl Ferrers	8 January 1974 – 4 March 1974	
Minister for Aviation Supply	Frederick Corfield	15 October 1970	New post. Abolished 1 May 1971 and functions transferred to Ministry of Defence
Parliamentary Secretary for Aviation Supply	David Price	15 October 1970	New post. Abolished 1 May 1971 and functions transferred to Ministry of Defence
Secretary of State for Defence	**Peter Carington, 6th Baron Carrington**	20 June 1970	
Secretary of State for Defence	**Ian Gilmour**	8 January 1974	
Minister of State for Defence	Robert Lindsay, Baron Balniel	23 June 1970	
Minister of State for Defence	Ian Gilmour	5 November 1972	
Minister of State for Defence	George Younger	8 January 1974	
Minister of State for Defence Procurement	Ian Gilmour	7 April 1971	Office abolished 5 November 1972
Under-Secretary of State for the Navy	Peter Kirk	24 June 1970	
Under-Secretary of State for the Navy	Antony Buck	5 November 1972	
Under-Secretary of State for the Air Force	Antony Lambton	24 June 1970	
Under-Secretary of State for the Air Force	Anthony Kershaw	5 June 1973	
Under-Secretary of State for the Air Force	Euan Howard, 4th Baron Strathcona and Mount Royal	8 January 1974	
Under-Secretary of State for the Army	Ian Gilmour	24 June 1970	
Under-Secretary of State for the Army	Geoffrey Johnson-Smith	7 April 1971	
Under-Secretary of State for the Army	Peter Blaker	5 November 1972	
Under-Secretary of State for the Army	Dudley Smith	8 January 1974	
Secretary of State for Education and Science	**Margaret Thatcher**	20 June 1970	
Minister of State, Education and Science	Norman St John-Stevas	5 June 1973	Minister for the Arts
Under-Secretary of State, Education and Science	John Ganzoni, 2nd Baron Belstead	24 June 1970 – 5 June 1973	
Under-Secretary of State, Education and Science	William van Straubenzee	24 June 1970 – 5 November 1972	
Under-Secretary of State, Education and Science	Norman St John-Stevas	5 November 1972 – 2 December 1973	
Under-Secretary of State, Education and Science	Timothy Raison	5 June 1973 – 4 March 1974	
Under-Secretary of State, Education and Science	John Edmondson, 2nd Baron Sandford	2 December 1973 – 4 March 1974	
Secretary of State for Employment	**Robert Carr**	20 June 1970	Employment and Productivity until 12 November 1970
Secretary of State for Employment	**Maurice Macmillan**	7 April 1972	
Secretary of State for Employment	**William Whitelaw**	2 December 1973	
Minister of State, Employment	Paul Bryan	23 June 1970	
Minister of State, Employment	Robin Chichester-Clark	7 April 1972	
Under-Secretary of State, Employment	Dudley Smith	24 June 1970 – 7 January 1974	
Under-Secretary of State, Employment	David Howell	5 January 1971 – 26 March 1972	
Under-Secretary of State, Employment	Nicholas Scott	8 January 1974 – 4 March 1974	
Secretary of State for Energy	**Peter Carington, 6th Baron Carrington**	8 January 1974	
Minister for Energy	**Patrick Jenkin**	8 January 1974	In Cabinet
Minister of State, Energy	David Howell	8 January 1974	
Under-Secretary of State, Energy	Peter Emery	8 January 1974	
Secretary of State for the Environment	**Peter Walker**	15 October 1970	
Secretary of State for the Environment	**Geoffrey Rippon**	5 November 1972	
Minister for Local Government and Development	Graham Page	15 October 1970	
Minister for Housing and Construction	Julian Amery	15 October 1970	
Minister for Housing and Construction	Paul Channon	5 November 1972	
Minister for Transport Industries	John Peyton	15 October 1970	
Under-Secretary of State, Environment	Eldon Griffiths	15 October 1970 – 4 March 1974	
Under-Secretary of State, Environment	Paul Channon	15 October 1970 – 26 March 1972	
Under-Secretary of State, Environment	John Cyril Edmondson, 2nd Baron Sandford	15 October 1970 – 5 June 1973	
Under-Secretary of State, Environment	Michael Heseltine	15 October 1970 – 7 April 1972	
Under-Secretary of State, Environment	Keith Speed	7 April 1972 – 4 March 1974	
Under-Secretary of State, Environment	Reginald Eyre	7 April 1972 – 4 March 1974	
Under-Secretary of State, Environment	Janet Young, Baroness Young	5 June 1973 – 4 March 1974	
Under-Secretary of State, Environment	Hugh Rossi	8 January 1974 – 4 March 1974	
Secretary of State for Social Services	**Sir Keith Joseph**	20 June 1970	
Minister of State, Health and Social Security	Morys Bruce, 4th Baron Aberdare	23 June 1970 – 8 January 1974	
Parliamentary Secretary, Health and Social Security	Paul Dean	24 June 1970 – 4 March 1974	
Parliamentary Secretary, Health and Social Security	Michael Alison	24 June 1970 – 4 March 1974	
Secretary of State for Housing and Local Government	**Peter Walker**	24 June 1970 – 15 October 1970	Part of Environment from 15 October 1970
Minister of State, Housing and Local Government	Graham Page	23 June 1970 – 15 October 1970	Part of Environment from 15 October 1970
Parliamentary Secretary, Housing and Local Government	Eldon Griffiths	23 June 1970 – 15 October 1970	Part of Environment from Oct 1970
Parliamentary Secretary, Housing and Local Government	Paul Channon	23 June 1970 – 15 October 1970	Part of Environment from Oct 1970
Parliamentary Secretary, Housing and Local Government	John Cyril Edmondson, 2nd Baron Sandford	23 June 1970 – 15 October 1970	Part of Environment from Oct 1970
Chancellor of the Duchy of Lancaster	**Anthony Barber**	20 June 1970	With special responsibility for Europe
Chancellor of the Duchy of Lancaster	**Geoffrey Rippon**	28 July 1970	
Chancellor of the Duchy of Lancaster	**John Davies**	5 November 1972	
Secretary of State for Northern Ireland	**William Whitelaw**	24 March 1972	
Secretary of State for Northern Ireland	**Francis Pym**	2 December 1973	
Minister of State, Northern Ireland	Paul Channon	26 March 1972 – 5 November 1972	
Minister of State, Northern Ireland	David Hennessy, 3rd Baron Windlesham	26 March 1972 – 5 June 1973	
Minister of State, Northern Ireland	William van Straubenzee	5 November 1972 – 4 March 1974	
Minister of State, Northern Ireland	David Howell	5 November 1972 – 8 January 1974	
Under-Secretary of State, Northern Ireland	David Howell	26 March 1972 – 5 November 1972	
Under-Secretary of State, Northern Ireland	Peter Mills	5 November 1972 – 4 March 1974	
Under-Secretary of State, Northern Ireland	The Lord Belstead	5 June 1973 – 4 March 1974	
Minister of Overseas Development	Richard Wood	23 June 1970 – 15 October 1970	Reorganised under Foreign Office, 12 November 1970
Paymaster General	David Eccles, 1st Viscount Eccles	23 June 1970	Minister for Arts. Not in Cabinet
Paymaster General	**Maurice Macmillan**	2 December 1973	
Minister without Portfolio	Niall Macpherson, 1st Baron Drumalbyn	15 October 1970	
Minister without Portfolio	Morys Bruce, 4th Baron Aberdare	8 January 1974	
Minister for Posts and Telecommunications	Christopher Chataway	24 June 1970	
Minister for Posts and Telecommunications	Sir John Eden	7 April 1972	
Minister of Public Buildings and Works	Julian Amery	23 June 1970 – 15 October 1970	Reorganised under Department of Environment 15 October 1970
Parliamentary Secretary, Public Buildings and Works	Anthony Kershaw	24 June 1970 – 15 October 1970	Reorganised under Department of Environment 15 October 1970
Secretary of State for Scotland	**Gordon Campbell**	20 June 1970	
Minister of State for Scotland	Priscilla Buchan, Baroness Tweedsmuir of Belhelvie	23 June 1970	
Minister of State for Scotland	Henry Hepburne-Scott, 10th Lord Polwarth	7 April 1972	
Under-Secretary of State for Scotland	Alick Buchanan-Smith	24 June 1970 – 4 March 1974	
Under-Secretary of State for Scotland	George Younger	24 June 1970 – 8 January 1974	
Under-Secretary of State for Scotland	Teddy Taylor	24 June 1970 – 28 July 1971	
Under-Secretary of State for Scotland	Hector Monro	28 July 1971 – 4 March 1974	
Under-Secretary of State for Scotland	Teddy Taylor	8 January 1974 – 4 March 1974	
Minister of Technology	**Geoffrey Rippon**	20 June 1970	
Minister of Technology	**John Davies**	28 July 1970 – 15 October 1970	Office reorganised under Trade & Industry 15 October 1970
Minister of State, Ministry of Technology	Sir John Eden	23 June 1970 – 15 October 1970	Office reorganised under Trade & Industry 15 October 1970
Minister of State, Ministry of Technology	Frederick Ponsonby, 10th Earl of Bessborough	24 June 1970 – 15 October 1970	Office reorganised under Trade & Industry 15 October 1970
Parliamentary Secretary, Ministry of Technology	David Price	24 June 1970 – 15 October 1970	Office reorganised under Trade & Industry 15 October 1970
Parliamentary Secretary, Ministry of Technology	Nicholas Ridley	24 June 1970 – 15 October 1970	Office reorganised under Trade & Industry 15 October 1970
President of the Board of Trade	**Michael Noble**	20 June 1970 – 15 October 1970	Office reorganised under Trade & Industry 15 October 1970
Minister of State, Board of Trade	Frederick Corfield	24 June 1970 – 15 October 1970	Office reorganised under Trade & Industry 15 October 1970
Parliamentary Secretary to the Board of Trade	Anthony Grant	24 June 1970 – 15 October 1970	Office reorganised under Trade & Industry 15 October 1970
Secretary of State for Trade and Industry	**John Davies**	15 October 1970	
Secretary of State for Trade and Industry	**Peter Walker**	5 November 1972	
Minister of State for Trade	Michael Noble	15 October 1970 – 5 November 1972	
Minister of State, Trade and Consumer Affairs	**Sir Geoffrey Howe**	5 November 1972	In Cabinet
Under-Secretary of State for Trade	Anthony Grant	15 October 1970	
Under-Secretary of State for Trade	Patrick Pery, 6th Earl of Limerick	7 April 1972	
Minister of State for Industry	Sir John Eden	15 October 1970	
Minister of State for Industry	Tom Boardman	7 April 1972	Office eliminated 8 January 1974
Under-Secretary of State for Industry	Nicholas Ridley	15 October 1970	
Under-Secretary of State for Industry	Peter Emery	7 April 1972	Office eliminated 8 January 1974
Minister for Aerospace	Frederick Corfield	1 May 1971	
Minister for Aerospace	Michael Heseltine	7 April 1972	Consolidated with Shipping 5 November 1972
Under-Secretary of State for Aerospace	David Price	1 May 1971	
Under-Secretary of State for Aerospace	Cranley Onslow	7 April 1972	Consolidated with Shipping 5 November 1972
Minister for Industrial Development	Christopher Chataway	7 April 1972	
Under-Secretary of State for Industrial Development	Anthony Grant	7 April 1972	
Minister of Transport	**John Peyton**	23 June 1970 – 15 October 1970	Transport merged with Environment Oct 1970
Parliamentary Secretary to the Ministry of Transport	Michael Heseltine	24 June 1970 – 15 October 1970	Transport merged with Environment Oct 1970
Secretary of State for Wales	**Peter Thomas**	20 June 1970	
Minister of State for Wales	David Gibson-Watt	23 June 1970	
Attorney General	Sir Peter Rawlinson	23 June 1970	
Solicitor General	Sir Geoffrey Howe	23 June 1970	
Solicitor General	Sir Michael Havers	5 November 1972	
Lord Advocate	Norman Wylie	23 June 1970	
Solicitor General for Scotland	David William Robert Brand	23 June 1970	
Solicitor General for Scotland	William Stewart	5 November 1972	Not an MP
Treasurer of the Household	Humphrey Atkins	24 June 1970	
Treasurer of the Household	Bernard Weatherill	2 December 1973	
Comptroller of the Household	Walter Elliott	24 June 1970	
Comptroller of the Household	Reginald Eyre	24 September 1970	
Comptroller of the Household	Bernard Weatherill	7 April 1972	
Comptroller of the Household	Walter Clegg	2 December 1973	
Vice-Chamberlain of the Household	Jasper More	24 June 1970	
Vice-Chamberlain of the Household	Bernard Weatherill	17 October 1971	
Vice-Chamberlain of the Household	Walter Clegg	7 April 1972	
Vice-Chamberlain of the Household	Paul Hawkins	2 December 1973	
Captain of the Gentlemen-at-Arms	Michael Hicks Beach, 2nd Earl St Aldwyn	24 June 1970	
Captain of the Yeomen of the Guard	John Goschen, 3rd Viscount Goschen	24 June 1970	
Captain of the Yeomen of the Guard	Bertram Bowyer, 2nd Baron Denham	20 November 1971	
Lords in Waiting	Charles Stourton, 26th Baron Mowbray	24 June 1970 – 4 March 1974	
Lords in Waiting	Bertram Bowyer, 2nd Baron Denham	24 June 1970 – 20 November 1971	
Lords in Waiting	Nicholas Bethell, 4th Baron Bethell	24 June 1970 – 5 January 1971	
Lords in Waiting	Robert Shirley, 13th Earl Ferrers	5 January 1971 – 8 January 1974	
Lords in Waiting	Peter Kerr, 12th Marquess of Lothian	7 April 1972 – 27 July 1973	
Lords in Waiting	Grey Gowrie, 2nd Earl of Gowrie	7 April 1972 – 4 March 1974	
Lords in Waiting	Janet Young, Baroness Young	21 April 1972 – 5 June 1973	
Lords in Waiting	Euan Howard, 4th Baron Strathcona and Mount Royal	27 June 1973 – 8 January 1974	
Lords in Waiting	Richard Hill, 7th Baron Sandys	8 January 1974 – 4 March 1974	
Lords in Waiting	Richard Wellesley, 6th Earl Cowley	8 January 1974 – 4 March 1974	
Lords in Waiting	Shane Alexander, 2nd Earl Alexander of Tunis	8 January 1974 – 4 March 1974	

Preceded by Second Wilson ministry	Government of the United Kingdom; 1970–1974	Succeeded by Third Wilson ministry
