= CIBE =

CIBE could mean:

- International Confederation of European Beet Growers
- CIBE-FM, a First Nations community radio station in Canada
- Compagnie Intercommunale Bruxelloise des Eaux, now known as Vivaqua
