= Birmingham West (European Parliament constituency) =

Former European Parliament constituency

- European Parliament constituency
- Boundary within the West Midlands (1984-1994)
- Member state: United Kingdom
- Created: 1984
- Dissolved: 1999
- MEPs: 1

Prior to its uniform adoption of proportional representation in 1999, the United Kingdom used first-past-the-post for the European elections in England, Scotland and Wales. The European Parliament constituencies used under that system were smaller than the later regional constituencies and only had one Member of the European Parliament each.

The constituency of Birmingham West was one of them.

It consisted of the Westminster Parliament constituencies (on their 1983 boundaries) of Aldridge-Brownhills, Birmingham Ladywood, Birmingham Perry Barr, Sutton Coldfield, Walsall North, Walsall South, West Bromwich East, and West Bromwich West.

== MEPs ==
Election	Member	Party
1984	John Tomlinson	Labour
1999	Constituency abolished: see West Midlands	

== Elections ==
European elections, 1984: Birmingham West
Party	Candidate	Votes	%	±%
Labour	John Tomlinson	61,946	45.2	
Conservative	Colin R.C. Hart	55,702	40.6	
SDP	Joseph C Binns	19,422	14.2	
Majority		5,237	4.6	
Turnout		137,070	27.3	
Labour win (new seat)				

European elections, 1989: Birmingham West
Party	Candidate	Votes	%	±%
Labour	John Tomlinson	86,545	50.5	+5.3
Conservative	Charles Francis Robinson	55,685	32.5	−7.9
Green	John D Bentley	21,384	12.5	New
SLD	Stewart Reynolds	7,673	4.5	−9.7
Majority		30,860	18.0	+13.4
Turnout		171,287	33.2	+5.9
Labour hold		Swing		

European elections, 1994: Birmingham West
Party	Candidate	Votes	%	±%
Labour	John Tomlinson	77,957	53.7	+3.2
Conservative	David M. Harman	38,607	26.6	−5.9
Liberal Democrats	Nicholas DM McGeorge	14,603	10.0	+5.5
UKIP	Dr Bernard A Juby	5,237	3.6	New
Green	Murray G Abbott	4,367	3.0	−9.5
National Front	Andrew Carmichael	3,727	2.6	New
Natural Law	Huw S Meads	789	0.5	New
Majority		39,350	27.1	+9.1
Turnout		145,287	28.5	−4.7
Labour hold		Swing		
