= 1968 Meriden by-election =

UK parliamentary by-election

The 1968 Meriden by-election was a by-election held for the British House of Commons constituency of Meriden in Warwickshire on 28 March 1968. It was won by the Conservative Party candidate Keith Speed.

== Vacancy ==
The seat had become vacant when the 38-year-old Labour incumbent Member of Parliament (MP), Christopher Rowland died on 5 November 1967 of pneumonia following a brief illness. He had held the seat since the 1964 general election.

== Result ==
The result was a clear victory for Speed in what had been a Labour marginal seat. It was one of three Conservative by-election gains from Labour on the same day, the others being at Acton and Dudley.

Speed held the seat until the February 1974 general election, when he lost the seat back to Labour. He went on to be MP for Ashford.

Meriden by-election, 1968
| Party | Candidate | Votes | % | ±% |
|---|---|---|---|---|
| Conservative | Keith Speed | 33,344 | 64.8 | +18.4 |
| Labour | Roderick MacFarquhar | 18,081 | 35.2 | −18.4 |
| Majority | | 15,263 | 29.6 | N/A |
| Turnout | | 51,425 | 66.0 | −19.7 |
| Conservative gain from Labour | | Swing | +18.4 | |

== Previous result ==
General election 1966: Meriden
| Party | Candidate | Votes | % | ±% |
|---|---|---|---|---|
| Labour | Christopher Rowland | 33,831 | 53.6 | +3.3 |
| Conservative | Jonathan Aitken | 29,250 | 46.4 | −3.3 |
| Majority | | 4,581 | 7.2 | +6.6 |
| Turnout | | 63,081 | 85.7 | +2.3 |
| Labour hold | | Swing | | |

== See also ==
- Meriden constituency
- List of United Kingdom by-elections
