= Gordon Matthews (politician) =

Gordon Richards Matthews CBE, FCA, FRSA

Member of Parliament for Meriden
- In office 8 October 1959 – 25 September 1964
- Preceded by: Reg Moss
- Succeeded by: Christopher Rowland

Personal details
- Born: 16 December 1908
- Died: 4 February 2000 (aged 91)
- Party: Conservative

Gordon Richards Matthews, CBE, FCA, FRSA (16 December 1908 – 4 February 2000) was a British chartered accountant, Director of a department store, and politician. Despite a near half-century involvement in the Conservative Party in the West Midlands, he served only a single term in Parliament.

== Accountancy ==
Matthews attended Repton School but did not go to university. Instead he trained as a chartered accountant, qualifying in 1932. His grandfather, William Matthews, had joined with John Rackham to set up Rackhams and Matthews department store in Bull Street, Birmingham, and this business had also employed his father Frank. Matthews himself joined the company in 1933 as a secretary, using his knowledge of accountancy.

== Conservative links ==
In 1934 Matthews married Ruth Brooks, the daughter of the former Lord Mayor of Birmingham Sir David Brooks. He also became involved in the Conservative Party, and in 1937 was appointed as Hon. Treasurer of Deritend Unionist Association. At the outbreak of the Second World War, Matthews enlisted in the Royal Navy; he was all set to join when he was switched to work as an accountant at the Admiralty.

At the end of the war, Matthews fought the Deritend division of Birmingham in the 1945 general election. He spent a great deal of time in the late 1940s reviving the Young Unionist association in Birmingham, under his own chairmanship. From 1948 to 1953 Matthews served as Hon. Secretary of the Birmingham Unionist Association, and at the 1950 general election he was the candidate in Birmingham Yardley. In the 1950s, Matthews was a member of the Board of Management of the Linen and Woollen Drapers Institution and acted as President of its Appeal for the year 1954–1955. He also get involved in the YMCA and was Chairman of the Finance Committee for the Birmingham Area. From 1957 to 1964, he was President of the City of Birmingham Friendly Society.

== Parliamentary candidate ==
Matthews did not find a seat at the 1951 or 1955 general elections, but was adopted for Meriden for the 1959 general election. This was a Labour-held marginal constituency which included prosperous and working-class areas, but Matthews took advantage of the national trend to the Conservatives to overturn a majority of over 1,000 to win by 263 votes.

== Backbencher ==
He proved a generally loyal Conservative backbencher, although he at first abstained on, and then supported, a new clause in the Finance Bill moved by Gerald Nabarro which aimed at exempting owner-occupiers from Schedule A income tax to which the government was opposed. In December 1960 he was appointed Parliamentary Private Secretary to Reginald Bevins; in March 1961, he initiated a debate on housing for the elderly, and called for private housebuilders to build more suitable homes. In December 1962 he called for reform of the rating system so that the burden fell more evenly. He opposed the government's move to abolish resale price maintenance in 1964, but abstained rather than vote against.

== Defeat ==
At the 1964 general election, Matthews had a tough time defending his seat given his narrow majority and the national trend to Labour. However, his record of diligent constituency work and the increased local prosperity (the car manufacturers were significant local employers) helped him. In one of the last results to be announced on the day of the election, Matthews lost to the Labour candidate – but only by 363 votes, a much better result for him than national trends would have seen.

== Post-Parliament career ==
Matthews found he had more time for his voluntary activities and served on the National Council and National Executive Committee of the YMCA from 1968 to 1971. He was also Chairman of the Finance Committee of the YWCA Birmingham Area from 1965 to 1972. Although giving up Parliamentary ambitions, he remained involved in the Conservative Party and served as Deputy Chairman, then Chairman of the West Midlands Conservative Council.

Later in the 1970s, Matthews retired to Chipping Campden in Gloucestershire. He was Chairman of the Oxfordshire Branch of the Campaign to Protect Rural England (CPRE) in the late 1970s and served one last term as President of the West Midlands Conservatives from 1983 to 1985. He died after a fall in 2000.

Parliament of the United Kingdom
Preceded by Reginald Moss	Member of Parliament for Meriden; 1959–1964	Succeeded by Christopher Rowland
