= Reg Moss =

Reginald Moss (5 December 1913 – 28 May 1995) was a British schoolteacher and Labour politician. After fighting an energetic campaign in Hemel Hempstead in the 1950 general election, he was elected as the first Member of Parliament for Meriden in 1955. As a backbencher he had a low profile but managed some achievements in House of Commons committees. Moss lost the highly marginal constituency after a single term and was forced to return to his previous career. He died many years later in obscurity.

== Family and education ==
Moss was the son of J.H. Moss, a colliery deputy at Parkhouse Colliery in Chesterton, Staffordshire; he was born in Audley, Staffordshire. At Wolstanton Grammar School he became Head Boy, and won a place at the University of Birmingham. There he won the Gladstone Prize, and was awarded a Bachelor of Arts degree in 1935. He stayed on at Birmingham for a further year and obtained a Diploma in Education the following year, a qualification needed for senior teaching posts.

== Professional life ==
After leaving university, Moss became a schoolteacher. A Methodist, in about 1934 he had become a lay preacher; he also joined the Labour Party in the late 1930s. Moss became involved as a tutor with the Workers' Educational Association and a lecturer with the National Council of Labour Colleges, also helping to give lectures to many Co-operative Societies. He wrote a Co-operative pamphlet entitled "The Way to Peace". In the late 1940s he went back to education himself, studying at the University of London for a Master of Arts degree which was awarded in 1949.

== Hemel Hempstead ==
In July 1949 Moss was working as a schoolmaster in Hertford when he was selected as Labour candidate for the Hemel Hempstead constituency. He had been secretary, and was then the chairman, of the Hertford Divisional Labour Party. Moss' opportunity to contest the seat came when a general election was called in February 1950; he was formally adopted as the Labour candidate at a meeting on 28 January 1950, rejecting a call from the Liberal Party candidate that he should stand aside. Moss told the meeting "I am opposed to both of them, both the Tory and the Liberal, and anyone with any understanding of social dynamics must understand that the Socialist takes up that position."

At the opening of the campaign Moss visited the rural area around Tring where he reported finding "filthy squalor and human misery" in countryside areas. Saying that he felt "ashamed and humiliated", he blamed the problems on the Conservative Party, explaining that "they had the means and opportunity to put it right and did nothing". The next week he addressed a meeting at the Boxmoor Hall where he described himself as a candidate "with his feet in the working class, and his head in the middle class, without money and without a price". He called on the new Parliament to bring about full employment, and claimed it was silly to talk about competition because the Conservative Party had destroyed it. Moss held a meeting specifically for women at Berkhamsted Town Hall on 15 February at which he insisted Labour was opposed to communism and was combatting it by improving living conditions in Britain and other countries.

On the eve of poll, the Labour Party circulated a leaflet which drew attention to remarks by the sitting Conservative Member in Parliament, Viscountess Davidson, on 15 December 1949 when she had said that bread and dripping was "the best possible food a child could have"; the leaflet was headlined "Bread and Dripping! – Lady Davidson's 'Best Diet' for workers' children". The Conservative Party objected that the comments had been taken out of context. On polling day, Viscountess Davidson won by nearly 7,000 votes with Moss taking a clear second place; it was said by the local newspaper that Moss had done better than generally expected. Moss took comfort from the fact that the Labour vote had increased from the previous election.

== Move to Warwickshire ==
Although Moss was said to be willing to fight Hemel Hempstead at future elections, and the Divisional Labour Party was willing to readopt him, in 1951 he moved away to Nuneaton. Moss was appointed head of the Day Continuation School, part of Nuneaton Technical College. He swiftly resumed his Labour Party activities in Nuneaton, becoming Chairman of Nuneaton Fabian Society, and Secretary of Nuneaton Constituency Labour Party. He became a member of the Abbey Street Methodist Church in Nuneaton. In 1953, Moss was made a Fellow of the Royal Economic Society.

== Meriden candidature ==
In a Boundary Commission report published in November 1954, a new constituency was created around Meriden in north Warwickshire. The constituency included a Birmingham overspill housing estate at Meriden, the Atherstone Rural District centred on Atherstone town, and the Tamworth Rural District which included most of the Warwickshire coalfield. When a general election was called in April 1955, Labour had hopes of winning. The selection for the candidate, held at Attlee Hall in Nuneaton on 23 April, saw five candidates interviewed; Moss was selected and was then adopted unanimously.

=== 1955 election campaign ===
The general election followed very soon; on being adopted as the Labour candidate, Moss said the Conservatives may have "hoped to win votes by bribery" with the tax-cutting 1955 budget. He then said that the election may have been called early "because later on this year we shall be facing a crisis". This theme was followed when Shadow cabinet member Alf Robens visited to speak for Moss on 11 May. During the campaign Moss stated that he "favours the intellectual approach" and the local press noted that the campaign was free of name-calling.

Opinion locally believed the Conservatives started off with an advantage due to smoother organisation in the early campaign; however Labour supporters came back more effectively in the last ten days. Moss had resigned his post at Nuneaton Technical College in order to fight the election (although there was an understanding that he could have his job back if he lost). Moss claimed that the Conservatives expected a majority in their favour of 2,000, even at the count; however a low turnout in Meriden coupled with a high poll in Atherstone saw Moss returned with a majority of 1,100.

== Parliament ==
Moss made an early maiden speech on 9 June, claiming that 1955 would be a crisis year in the balance of payments and that action was necessary to stop economic dependence on countries using the dollar. After a second budget later in the year, Moss demanded the continuation of farming subsidies to prevent "alarm and despondency" from spreading still further. Early in 1956 he pressed the Board of Trade to intervene in the case of car factories in the midlands who were on short-time working, in order to help the export trade. He took the same issue up later, describing the fall in car exports as "doleful statistics". Speaking on the 1956 budget, Moss criticised the size of the defence budget, and described the increasing greed in society as a "moral deterioration" caused by removing ourselves from the idea of mutual service.

During Moss' first session in Parliament he was active in debating the Teachers (Superannuation) Bill; he was opposed to the increase in contributions from 5% to 6% of salary but said that teachers would support higher payments if there was a system providing for widows and dependents similar to the civil service pension scheme. Although admitting the Bill had been improved by its debate, he remained opposed to its provisions.

== Suez ==
In a speech at Eastern Green on 11 January 1956, Moss had claimed that the preoccupation with pacts by the Conservative government had "set the Near East on fire" and that there was a danger of war between the Arab states and Israel in 1956. As the Suez Crisis began, Moss spoke at Corley saying that Anthony Eden could not impose on Egypt a plan which it did not accept, and urged compromise because freedom to use the canal mattered more than Nasser's nationalisation. He followed the Labour Party line in opposing the invasion of Suez, and addressed a public meeting on "Law–Not War" held at the Miners' Welfare Hall in Atherstone on 9 November 1956; the advertisement for the meeting claimed that public opinion could stop the war.

== 1959 general election ==
At the opening of the 1959 general election campaign, Moss made a speech criticising the Conservative government's foreign policy, specifically in Cyprus which he claimed had seen a "series of Tory death-dealing blunders" and in Nyasaland where he said the Government had been condemned by its own Devlin Commission. He looked forward confidently to re-election, having dealt with 456 problems brought by constituents. Later in the campaign, echoing a Labour campaign theme, he pledged to support an increase in state pensions.

Moss agreed, together with his Conservative opponent Gordon Matthews, to join the Temperance Group in the House of Commons if they won; the two jointly received a delegation of clergy and laymen from the Tamworth and District Ministers and Clergy Fraternal who put the principles of the National Temperance Federation to them in the last week of the campaign. The end result was that Moss lost his seat to Conservative candidate Gordon Matthews.

== Post-Parliamentary career ==
Moss ascribed his defeat to the 700 postal votes issued in the election. After his defeat was announced, Moss declared that he would leave politics and rejoin the teaching profession; he began part-time work as a teacher at Nuneaton Technical College the week after the election.

Moss soon slipped into relative obscurity. Entitled to an entry in Who's Who until his death, his entries in 1964 and 1965 included no current address. In 1966 a move to Coventry was reported; but the ensuing three years he gave only the address of his party's regional office. From 1970 to 1975 his entry appeared with no address; after 1976 it did not appear any more.

Moss died on 28 May 1995, "peacefully in hospital" in Middlesbrough. He was cremated on 2 June 1995 at St Hilda's Chapel, Teesside Crematorium.

Parliament of the United Kingdom
New constituency	Member of Parliament for Meriden; 1955–1959	Succeeded by Gordon Matthews
