= Iain Mills =

British politician

Member of Parliament for Meriden
- In office 3 May 1979 – 16 January 1997
- Preceded by: John Tomlinson
- Succeeded by: Caroline Spelman

Councillor for Lichfield District Council
- In office 1974–1976

Personal details
- Born: 21 April 1940 Glasgow, Scotland
- Died: 16 January 1997 (aged 56) London, England
- Party: Conservative
- Spouse: Gaynor Jeffries (m. 1971)

Iain Campbell Mills (21 April 1940 – 16 January 1997) was a Conservative Party politician in the United Kingdom.

Mills was born in Scotland but grew up in Rhodesia (now Zimbabwe) and was educated at Prince Edward School in Harare and the University of Cape Town in South Africa. He subsequently returned to Britain, where he worked as a Market Planning Executive for Dunlop, and helped design the tyres that Jackie Stewart used to win a World Drivers' Championship. He married Gaynor Jeffries in 1971, and served as a councillor on Lichfield District Council from 1974 until 1976.

He entered the House of Commons at the 1979 general election as Member of Parliament (MP) for the constituency of Meriden. He was a parliamentary private secretary to Norman Tebbit.

On 16 January 1997, Mills was found dead from alcohol poisoning at his Dolphin Square flat, aged 56. This caused the government of John Major to lose its slender parliamentary majority months before the upcoming national election.

== Sources ==
- The BBC Guide to Parliament, BBC Books, 1979, ISBN 0-563-17748-9.
- http://www.election.demon.co.uk

Parliament of the United Kingdom
Preceded by John Tomlinson	Member of Parliament for Meriden; 1979 – 1997	Succeeded by Caroline Spelman
