= Christopher Rowland =

British politician (1929–1967)

Member of Parliament for Meriden
- In office 15 October 1964 – 5 November 1967
- Preceded by: Gordon Matthews
- Succeeded by: Keith Speed

Personal details
- Born: Christopher John Salter Rowland; 26 September 1929
- Died: 5 November 1967 (aged 38)
- Party: Labour

Christopher John Salter Rowland (26 September 1929 – 5 November 1967) was a British politician. He was rated one of the more effective of the Labour Party's 1964 intake to Parliament, but died at the age of 38.

== Student life ==
Rowland went to Chesterfield Grammar School and then the London School of Economics where he obtained a degree in Economic Science. He then went to Corpus Christi College, Oxford where he obtained a Bachelor of Philosophy degree.

== Student politics ==
Having joined the Labour Party in 1946, Rowland became an active participant in student politics: in 1952 he was Chairman of the London School of Economics Labour Society. In 1953 he was elected Chairman of the National Association of Labour Student Organisations, a sabbatical post. He also joined the Fabian Society, for whom he became Treasurer of the Africa Bureau.

== BBC producer ==
On leaving student politics in 1954 he was recruited by the BBC as a talks producer in the Overseas Service. In 1957 he was on the Executive of the Commonwealth Fund Fellowship to the USA. When he fought Eastleigh in the 1959 general election, he had to leave the BBC which was committed to political neutrality (his dismissal became a controversy); in 1960 he moved to the Booker Group where he was an Information Officer.

== Elected to Parliament ==
Rowland succeeded in winning the Meriden seat at the 1964 general election, a gain which was one of the last constituencies to be announced and which showed that Labour was likely to win an overall majority. He became Parliamentary Private Secretary to the Ministers of State at the Foreign Office.

== Rhodesia ==
In January 1966, Rowland travelled with two other Labour MPs (Jeremy Bray and David Ennals) to Rhodesia (which had just declared independence from the United Kingdom; albeit unofficially recognised) to see what conditions there were like, and meet some of those involved. Supporters of Ian Smith asked to meet them and so the three men agreed a time when they would talk; unexpectedly, more than 400 turned up and a rowdy meeting ensued. At the end, one of the Rhodesians attempted to snatch Rowland's papers and Rowland, while attempting to get them back, was forced to the floor, kicked, punched and had water thrown over him. Rowland was insistent that the Wilson government should not back down on confronting Ian Smith's Rhodesia.

== Re-election ==
Rowland easily retained his seat with a much improved majority at the 1966 general election, benefiting from his prominence after the Rhodesian assault incident. He beat Jonathan Aitken, the youngest Conservative Party candidate at the time. His BBC experience showed when he pledged to vote against the government if it decided to allow commercial radio.

In October 1967, he was taken ill on a visit to his constituency, and died two weeks later of pneumonia and pleurisy.

Parliament of the United Kingdom
Preceded by Gordon Matthews	Member of Parliament for Meriden; 1964–1967	Succeeded by Keith Speed
