= Meriden (constituency) =

Parliamentary constituency in the United Kingdom, 1955-2024

- Former county constituency for the House of Commons
- 2010–2024 boundary of Meriden in the West Midlands

- Location of the West Midlands within England
- County: West Midlands
- Electorate: 83,428 (December 2010)
- Major settlements: Balsall Common, Hampton-in-Arden, Meriden and Chelmsley Wood

1955–2024
- Seats: One
- Created from: Sutton Coldfield and Nuneaton
- Replaced by: Meriden and Solihull East; Birmingham Hodge Hill and Solihull North (part); Solihull West and Shirley (part)

Meriden was a constituency (Note: A county constituency (for the purposes of election expenses and type of returning officer)) represented in the House of Commons of the UK Parliament. (Note: As with all constituencies, the constituency elects one Member of Parliament (MP) by the first past the post system of election at least every five years.) It was named after the village of Meriden, halfway between Solihull and Coventry.

Further to the completion of the 2023 Periodic Review of Westminster constituencies, the seat was abolished. Subject to boundary changes, it was reformed as new Meriden and Solihull East constituency, first contested in the 2024 general election.

== Constituency profile ==
The constituency was one of two covering the Metropolitan Borough of Solihull. It covered the rural area known as the Meriden Gap located between the West Midlands conurbation and Coventry, which contains villages such as Balsall Common, Hampton-in-Arden, and Meriden itself, with some suburban towns, particularly Castle Bromwich and Chelmsley Wood (a large area of 1960s council housing on the eastern edge of Birmingham, some of which since acquired privately under the right to buy others of which being remaining social housing), higher than average national income and affluent areas particular examples being Hockley Heath, Bentley Heath, Temple Balsall, Catherine-de-Barnes, Dorridge and Knowle. Incidence of home ownership in this area is high, as opposed to the rented sector.

== History ==
Meriden was the largest geographical constituency in the West Midlands metropolitan area. It was created for the 1955 general election.

The 1983 boundary changes and landslide electoral success of Margaret Thatcher that year transformed the constituency into a Conservative safe seat, with the Labour-leaning areas becoming part of the new Warwickshire North constituency (which was also won by the Conservatives). Iain Mills held this seat until he died in office in January 1997, with the seat remaining vacant until the dissolution of Parliament that March (and therefore no by-election being held). Caroline Spelman was victorious in the 1997 general election, though on that occasion only by a marginal majority, and held the seat until her retirement in 2019, with the challenge from Labour becoming more distant.

== Boundaries ==
Map of 2010–2024 boundaries

The constituency was created in 1955 following a review of parliamentary seats in Warwickshire by the Boundary Commission appointed under the House of Commons (Redistribution of Seats) Act 1949. The constituency's area was transferred from the neighbouring constituencies of Nuneaton and Sutton Coldfield.

Tamworth Rural District was abolished in 1965, with most of its area redistributed between the two neighbouring rural districts. Accordingly, this resulted in only a minor boundary change to the constituency in 1974.

Until 1983 the seat was a Labour-Conservative marginal, covering the coal mining areas of northern Warwickshire and the more affluent area near Solihull. It changed hands between the two parties several times, including in a by-election in 1968, which was won by Keith Speed of the Conservatives.

In 1983, reflecting the major local government boundary changes effected by the Local Government Act 1972, a new Meriden County Constituency was created as part of the parliamentary county of West Midlands. There were no boundary changes in 1997. The Conservatives have generally achieved solid majorities in the constituency since 1983, although Labour came within 582 votes of gaining the seat in its 1997 landslide.

1955–1974: The Rural Districts of Atherstone, Meriden, and Tamworth.

1974–1983: The Rural Districts of Atherstone and Meriden.

1983–2010: The Metropolitan Borough of Solihull wards of Bickenhill, Castle Bromwich, Chelmsley Wood, Fordbridge, Kingshurst, Knowle, Meriden, Packwood, and Smith's Wood.

2010–2024: The Metropolitan Borough of Solihull wards of Bickenhill, Blythe, Castle Bromwich, Chelmsley Wood, Dorridge and Hockley Heath, Kingshurst and Fordbridge, Knowle, Meriden, and Smith's Wood.

== Members of Parliament ==
The MP from 1997 to 2019 was the Conservative Caroline Spelman. Conservative Saqib Bhatti took over the position after the 2019 General Election.

Election	Member	Party	Notes
1955	Reg Moss	Labour	
1959	Gordon Matthews	Conservative	
1964	Christopher Rowland	Labour	Died November 1967
1968 by-election	Keith Speed	Conservative	
February 1974	John Tomlinson	Labour	
1979	Iain Mills	Conservative	Died January 1997; no by-election held due to imminent general election
1997	Caroline Spelman	Conservative	Secretary of State for Environment, Food and Rural Affairs (2010–2012); Second Church Estates Commissioner (2015–2020)
2019	Saqib Bhatti	Conservative	
2024	Constituency abolished		

== Elections ==
=== Elections in the 1950s ===
General election 1955: Meriden
Party	Candidate	Votes	%	±%
Labour	Reg Moss	22,796	51.24	
Conservative	John Peel	21,691	48.76	
Majority		1,105	2.48	
Turnout		44,487	81.48	
Labour win (new seat)				

General election 1959: Meriden
Party	Candidate	Votes	%	±%
Conservative	Gordon Matthews	26,498	50.25	
Labour	Reg Moss	26,235	49.75	
Majority		263	0.50	N/A
Turnout		52,733	84.44	
Conservative gain from Labour		Swing		

=== Elections in the 1960s ===
General election 1964: Meriden
Party	Candidate	Votes	%	±%
Labour	Christopher Rowland	29,425	50.31	
Conservative	Gordon Matthews	29,062	49.69	
Majority		363	0.62	N/A
Turnout		58,487	83.45	
Labour gain from Conservative		Swing		

General election 1966: Meriden
Party	Candidate	Votes	%	±%
Labour	Christopher Rowland	33,831	53.6	+3.3
Conservative	Jonathan Aitken	29,250	46.4	−3.3
Majority		4,581	7.2	+6.6
Turnout		63,081	85.7	+2.3
Labour hold		Swing		

Meriden by-election, 1968
Party	Candidate	Votes	%	±%
Conservative	Keith Speed	33,344	64.8	+18.4
Labour	Roderick MacFarquhar	18,081	35.2	−18.4
Majority		15,263	29.6	N/A
Turnout		51,425	66.0	−19.7
Conservative gain from Labour		Swing	+18.4	

=== Elections in the 1970s ===
General election 1970: Meriden
Party	Candidate	Votes	%	±%
Conservative	Keith Speed	40,077	53.13	
Labour	Peter Lister	35,353	46.87	
Majority		4,724	6.26	
Turnout		75,430	75.59	
Conservative hold		Swing		

General election February 1974: Meriden
Party	Candidate	Votes	%	±%
Labour	John Tomlinson	40,541	52.93	
Conservative	Keith Speed	36,056	47.07	
Majority		4,485	5.86	N/A
Turnout		76,597	79.47	
Labour gain from Conservative		Swing		

General election October 1974: Meriden
Party	Candidate	Votes	%	±%
Labour	John Tomlinson	34,641	47.39	
Conservative	Christopher Horne	25,675	35.12	
Liberal	Dennis Minnis	12,782	17.49	New
Majority		8,966	12.27	
Turnout		73,098	75.08	
Labour hold		Swing		

General election 1979: Meriden
Party	Candidate	Votes	%	±%
Conservative	Iain Mills	37,151	48.77	
Labour	John Tomlinson	33,024	43.35	
Liberal	David Spurling	4,976	6.53	
National Front	Alfred Parkes	1,032	1.35	New
Majority		4,127	5.42	N/A
Turnout		76,183	77.02	
Conservative gain from Labour		Swing		

=== Elections in the 1980s ===
General election 1983: Meriden
Party	Candidate	Votes	%	±%
Conservative	Iain Mills	28,474	53.7	
Labour	John Sever	13,456	25.4	
SDP	Pamela Dunbar	10,674	20.1	
National Front	Cliff Collins	460	0.9	
Majority		15,018	28.3	
Turnout		53,064	71.6	
Conservative hold		Swing		

General election 1987: Meriden
Party	Candidate	Votes	%	±%
Conservative	Iain Mills	31,935	55.1	+1.4
Labour	Richard Burden	15,115	26.1	+0.7
SDP	Christine Parkinson	10,896	18.8	−1.3
Majority		16,820	29.0	+0.7
Turnout		57,946	73.9	+2.3
Conservative hold		Swing	+0.3	

=== Elections in the 1990s ===
General election 1992: Meriden
Party	Candidate	Votes	%	±%
Conservative	Iain Mills	33,462	55.1	±0.0
Labour Co-op	Nick Stephens	18,763	30.9	+4.8
Liberal Democrats	Judy A Morris	8,489	14.0	−4.8
Majority		14,699	24.2	−4.8
Turnout		60,714	78.8	+4.9
Conservative hold		Swing	−2.4	

General election 1997: Meriden
Party	Candidate	Votes	%	±%
Conservative	Caroline Spelman	22,997	42.0	−13.1
Labour	Brian Seymour-Smith	22,415	41.0	+10.1
Liberal Democrats	Tony Dupont	7,098	13.0	−1.0
Referendum	Paul Gilbert	2,208	4.0	New
Majority		582	1.0	−23.2
Turnout		54,718	71.7	−7.1
Conservative hold		Swing	−11.6	

=== Elections in the 2000s ===
General election 2001: Meriden
Party	Candidate	Votes	%	±%
Conservative	Caroline Spelman	21,246	47.7	+5.7
Labour	Christine Shawcroft	17,462	39.2	−1.8
Liberal Democrats	Nigel Hicks	4,941	11.1	−1.9
UKIP	Richard Adams	910	2.0	New
Majority		3,784	8.5	+7.5
Turnout		44,559	60.4	−11.3
Conservative hold		Swing	+3.7	

General election 2005: Meriden
Party	Candidate	Votes	%	±%
Conservative	Caroline Spelman	22,416	48.2	+0.5
Labour	Jim Brown	15,407	33.1	−6.1
Liberal Democrats	William Laitinen	7,113	15.3	+4.2
UKIP	Denis Brookes	1,567	3.4	+1.4
Majority		7,009	15.1	+6.6
Turnout		46,503	60.1	−0.3
Conservative hold		Swing	+3.3	

=== Elections in the 2010s ===
General election 2010: Meriden
Party	Candidate	Votes	%	±%
Conservative	Caroline Spelman	26,956	51.7	+4.0
Labour	Ed Williams	10,703	20.5	−11.7
Liberal Democrats	Simon Slater	9,278	17.8	+1.0
BNP	Frank O'Brien	2,511	4.8	New
UKIP	Barry Allcock	1,378	2.6	−0.7
Green	Elly Stanton	678	1.3	New
Solihull and Meriden Residents' Association	Nikki Sinclaire	658	1.3	New
Majority		16,253	31.2	+15.7
Turnout		52,162	63.3	+3.2
Conservative hold		Swing	+7.9	

General election 2015: Meriden
Party	Candidate	Votes	%	±%
Conservative	Caroline Spelman	28,791	54.7	+3.0
Labour	Tom McNeil	9,996	19.0	−1.5
UKIP	Mick Gee	8,908	16.9	+14.3
Liberal Democrats	Ade Adeyemo	2,638	5.0	−12.8
Green	Alison Gavin	2,170	4.1	+2.8
Independence from Europe	Chris Booth	100	0.2	New
Majority		18,795	35.7	+4.5
Turnout		52,603	64.9	+1.6
Conservative hold		Swing	+2.3	

General election 2017: Meriden
Party	Candidate	Votes	%	±%
Conservative	Caroline Spelman	33,873	62.0	+7.3
Labour	Tom McNeil	14,675	26.9	+7.9
Liberal Democrats	Antony Rogers	2,663	4.9	−0.1
UKIP	Les Kaye	2,016	3.7	−13.2
Green	Alison Gavin	1,416	2.6	−1.5
Majority		19,198	35.1	−0.6
Turnout		54,643	67.6	+2.7
Conservative hold		Swing	−0.3	

General election 2019: Meriden
Party	Candidate	Votes	%	±%
Conservative	Saqib Bhatti	34,358	63.4	+1.4
Labour	Teresa Beddis	11,522	21.3	−5.6
Liberal Democrats	Laura McCarthy	5,614	10.4	+5.5
Green	Stephen Caudwell	2,667	4.9	+2.3
Majority		22,836	42.1	+7.0
Turnout		54,161	64.9	−2.7
Conservative hold		Swing	+3.5	

== See also ==
- List of parliamentary constituencies in the West Midlands (county)
