= Under-Secretary of State for the Navy =

The Under-Secretary of State for the Navy was a junior ministerial position in the Ministry of Defence in the British government. The minister had jurisdiction over the Royal Navy.

== List of ministers ==
Name	Portrait	Term of office		Party	Prime Minister	Cabinet
Under-Secretary of State for Transport
Peter Kirk		24 June 1970	1973	Conservative	Edward Heath	Heath ministry
Antony Buck		5 November 1972	1974	Conservative	Edward Heath	Heath ministry
Frank Judd		8 March 1974	1976	Labour	Harold Wilson	Wilson/Callaghan
Patrick Duffy		14 April 1976	1979	Labour	James Callaghan	Wilson/Callaghan
Keith Speed		6 May 1979	18 May 1981	Conservative	Margaret Thatcher	First Thatcher ministry
