= John Tomlinson, Baron Tomlinson =

British politician (1939–2024)

The Right Honourable The Lord Tomlinson
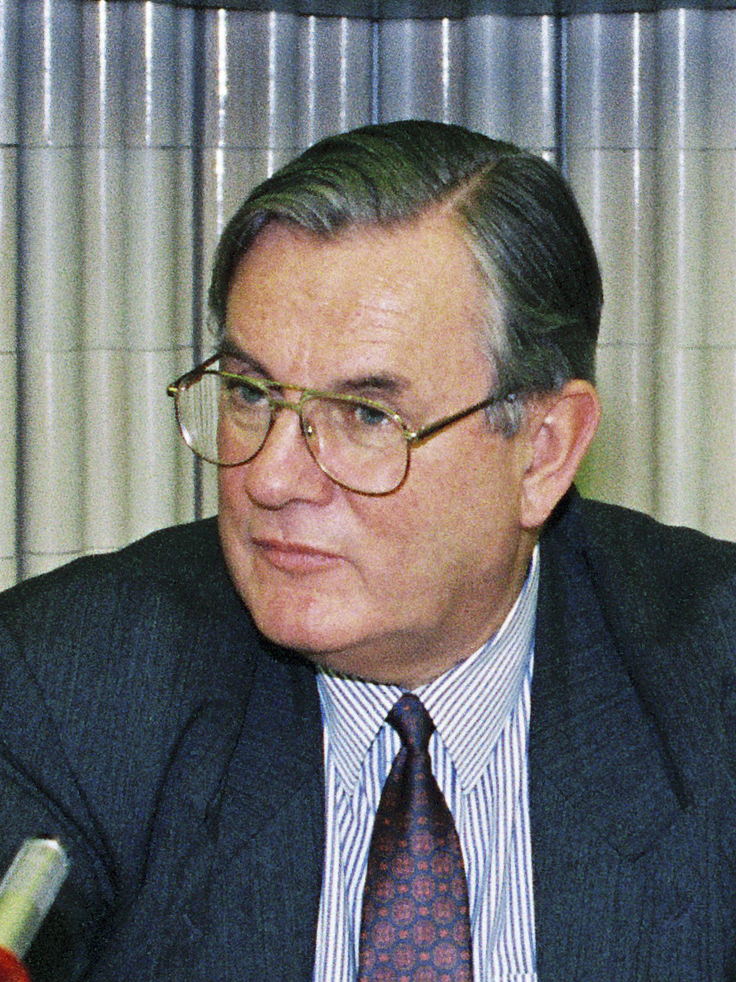
- Tomlinson in 1996

Parliamentary Secretary to the Ministry of Overseas Development
- In office 3 January 1977 – 4 May 1979
- Prime Minister: James Callaghan
- Preceded by: Frank Judd
- Succeeded by: office abolished

Parliamentary Under-Secretary of State for Foreign and Commonwealth Affairs
- In office 17 March 1976 – 4 May 1979
- Prime Minister: Harold Wilson; James Callaghan
- Preceded by: Ted Rowlands
- Succeeded by: Richard Luce

Member of the House of Lords
- Lord Temporal
- Life peerage 21 July 1998 – 20 January 2024

Member of the European Parliament for Birmingham West
- In office 14 June 1984 – 10 June 1999
- Preceded by: constituency established
- Succeeded by: constituency abolished

Member of Parliament for Meriden
- In office 28 February 1974 – 7 April 1979
- Preceded by: Keith Speed
- Succeeded by: Iain Mills

Personal details
- Born: 1 August 1939 London, England
- Died: 20 January 2024 (aged 84)
- Party: Labour Co-operative
- Education: Co-operative College; Brunel University; University of Warwick

John Edward Tomlinson, Baron Tomlinson (1 August 1939 – 20 January 2024) was a British Labour Co-operative politician. He served as a life peer in the House of Lords from 1998 until his death, and had previously been a Member of Parliament from 1974 to 1979, and a Member of the European Parliament (MEP) from 1984 to 1999.

Tomlinson was a pro-European Labour moderate who was Harold Wilson's final Parliamentary Private Secretary.

== Early life ==
Born in London, Tomlinson was educated at Westminster City School and the Co-operative College in Loughborough. He later studied health services management at Brunel University, and in 1982 he was awarded an MA in industrial relations from the University of Warwick.

== Professional and early political career ==
Tomlinson was active in Yorkshire politics, secretary of Sheffield Co-operative Party and an executive member of Yorkshire Labour Party. He was the youngest councillor on Sheffield City Council from 1964. He worked as head of research for the Amalgamated Union of Engineering Workers 1968–1970.

== Parliamentary career ==
Tomlinson stood for Parliament without success in 1966 at Bridlington and in 1970 at Walthamstow East. He was elected to the House of Commons as Labour Member of Parliament for Meriden in the February 1974 general election, defeating the sitting Conservative MP Keith Speed. In the October 1974 General Election he retained the seat, defeating a new Conservative candidate, the former Chairman of the Highway Planning Committee in the London Borough of Hammersmith, and Chairman of the Hyde Park Tories (the Conservative Party's open air speakers) Christopher Horne. He lost his seat in the 1979 general election to the Conservative candidate, Iain Mills.

During his five years in the Commons, he held a series of government posts:

- Parliamentary Private Secretary (PPS) to Prime Minister Harold Wilson (1975–76);
- Parliamentary Under-Secretary of State, Foreign and Commonwealth Office (1976–79);
- Parliamentary Secretary, Ministry of Overseas Development (1977–79)

After his defeat in 1979, he lectured at Solihull College of Technology. After unsuccessfully standing in the new constituency of North Warwickshire at the general election held in June 1983, in 1984, Tomlinson was elected as Labour Co-operative Member of the European Parliament (MEP) for the new euro-constituency of Birmingham West. He was re-elected in the 1989 European election and in the 1994 election, but did not stand for re-election under the new list system in the 1999 election.

Tomlinson .

In the European Parliament, he was, notably, Deputy Leader of the European Parliamentary Labour Party (EPLP), Chair of the cross-party intergroup on Sports policy and the Parliament's rapporteur on the EU budget for 1990.

On 21 July 1998, he was created a life peer as Baron Tomlinson, of Walsall in the County of West Midlands.

Tomlinson was latterly Chair of the Association of Independent Higher Education Providers.

=== Elections contested ===
==== UK Parliament elections ====
Date	Constituency	Party	Votes	% votes	Position	Ref.
1966 general election	Bridlington	Labour	11,939	29.65	2nd of 3	
1970 general election	Walthamstow East	Labour	13,732	45.0	2nd of 3	
February 1974 general election	Meriden	Labour	40,451	52.93	Won	
October 1974 general election	Meriden	Labour	34,641	47.39	Won	
1979 general election	Meriden	Labour	33,024	43.35	2nd of 4	
1983 general election	North Warwickshire	Labour	19,867	37.1	2nd of 3	

==== European Parliament elections ====
Date	Constituency	Party	Votes	% votes	Position	Ref.
1984	Birmingham West	Labour Co-op	61,946	45.2	Won	
1989	Birmingham West	Labour Co-op	86,452	50.5	Won	
1994	Birmingham West	Labour Co-op	77,957	53.7	Won	

== Death ==
Tomlinson died on 20 January 2024, at the age of 84. He died at Heartlands Hospital in Birmingham following a brief illness.

== Sources ==
- https://web.archive.org/web/20050608163239/http://european-convention.eu.int/CVs/pdf/TOMLINSON.pdf

Parliament of the United Kingdom
Preceded by Keith Speed	Member of Parliament for Meriden; Feb 1974–1979	Succeeded by Iain Mills
European Parliament
New constituency	Member of the European Parliament for Birmingham West; 1984–1999	Constituency abolished
