= Keith Speed =

British politician

Sir Keith Speed RD DL

Member of Parliament for Meriden
- In office 29 March 1968 – 8 February 1974
- Preceded by: Christopher Rowland
- Succeeded by: John Tomlinson

Member of Parliament for Ashford
- In office 10 October 1974 – 8 April 1997
- Preceded by: Bill Deedes
- Succeeded by: Damian Green

Personal details
- Born: Herbert Keith Speed; 11 March 1934 Evesham, Worcestershire, England
- Died: 12 January 2018 (aged 83) Ashford, Kent, England
- Party: Conservative

Sir Herbert Keith Speed RD DL (11 March 1934 – 12 January 2018) was a British Conservative politician and former Member of Parliament. He was a descendant of cartographer and historian John Speed.

== Life ==
Speed was born on 11 March 1934 in Evesham and educated at Bedford Modern School. He served in the Royal Navy from 1947 to 1956 and continued in the Royal Naval Reserve thereafter as a Lt Cdr. After a period as a sales and marketing manager, he gained employment in the Conservative Research Department in 1965.

After unsuccessfully contesting St Helens in 1964, Speed was elected MP for Meriden in Warwickshire in a 1968 by-election and held the seat until 1974. New constituency boundaries were drawn up prior to the February 1974 general election and Speed lost his Meriden seat to Labour's John Tomlinson, who retained the seat in October 1974 defeating Christopher Horne. He was selected to succeed Bill Deedes as Conservative Candidate for the seat of Ashford in Kent in the October 1974 General Election, and was elected as MP with a majority of over 6,000.

On 4 May 1979 he was appointed Parliamentary Undersecretary of State for Defence, a position known then as the Navy Minister. He was sacked by Margaret Thatcher in May 1981, after refusing to hand in his resignation. This was because he was unable to accept the reductions in the strength of the Royal Navy proposed by Thatcher and then Secretary of State for Defence, John Nott. With typical service humour, a Royal Navy saying of the time was the fictitious order "Less (K)notts, more Speed!". Later events in the Falklands War showed the shrewdness of his position, and he was knighted in the 1992 Birthday Honours. He retired as an MP in 1997.

In 1982 he wrote a book, Sea Change (see bibliography), which outlined the background to the Falklands conflict and expressed admiration for former Soviet Admiral Sergey Gorshkov.

As of April 2005, Sir Keith Speed was a Deputy Lord-Lieutenant for the County of Kent, and Vice President of the Maritime Volunteer Service.

Speed died in hospital on 12 January 2018.

== Bibliography ==
- Speed, Keith (1982). Sea Change: The Battle for the Falklands and the Future of Britain's Navy. Ashgrove Press ISBN 0-906798-20-5

Parliament of the United Kingdom
Preceded by Christopher Rowland	Member of Parliament for Meriden; 1968 – Feb. 1974	Succeeded by John Tomlinson
Preceded by W.F. Deedes	Member of Parliament for Ashford; Oct. 1974 – 1997	Succeeded by Damian Green
