= International Confederation of European Beet Growers =

Organization representing sugar beet farmers

Logo of the International Confederation of European Beet Growers

The International Confederation of European Beet Growers (Confédération Internationale des Betteraviers Européens - CIBE) is an organization representing sugar beet farmers in 15 countries in Europe. It operates on behalf of affiliate organizations in each country. Its head office is in Brussels, Belgium.

It was founded in Warsaw in Poland in 1925. It is a member of the EU Beet Sugar Sustainability Partnership and the International Institute of Sugar Beet Research.

== Affiliated organizations ==
Country	Organization Name	Abbreviation
Sweden	Betodlarna	
Finland	Maa- ja metsätaloustuottajain Keskusliitto	MTK
United Kingdom	National Farmers' Union Sugar Board	NFU Sugar
Netherlands	Koninklijke Coöperatie Cosun U.A.	Cosun
Belgium	Confédération des Betteraviers Belges / Confederatie van de Belgische Bietenplanters	CBB
France	Confédération générale des planteurs de betteraves	CGB
France	Fédération Nationale des Coopératives de collecte et de transformation de la Betterave	FCB
Italy	Cooperativa Produttori Bieticoli	COPROB
Switzerland	Fédération Suisse des Betteraviers	FSB
Switzerland	Schweizerischer Verband der Zuckerrübenpflanzer	SVZ
Germany	Dachverband Norddeutscher Zuckerrübenanbauer e.V.	DNZ
Germany	Verband Süddeutscher Zuckerrübenanbauer e. V.	VSZ
Germany	Rheinischer Rübenanbauer-Verband e. V.	RRV
Denmark	Danske Sukkerroedyrkere	DKS
Austria	Vereinigung der österreichischen Rübenbauernorganisationen	VÖR
Hungary	Cukorrépa Termesztők Országos Szövetsége	CTOSZ
Romania	Federaţia cultivatorilor de sfeclă de zahăr din România	FCSZR
Greece	Panhellenic Confederation Of Agricultural Cooperative Organizations	PASEGES
Greece	General Confederation Of Greek Agrarian Associations	GESASE
Turkey	Pancar Ekicileri Kooperatifleri Birligi	PANKOBIRLIK
Slovakia	Zväz pestovateľov cukrovej repy Slovenska	ZPCRS
Czech Republic	Svaz pěstitelů cukrovky Čech	SPCC
Poland	Krajowy Związek Plantatorów Buraka Cukrowego	KZPBC

== See also ==
- European Association of Sugar Manufacturers
- International Sugar Organization
- World Association of Beet and Cane Growers
