= West Midlands conurbation =

Coordinates: 52.511794°N 1.975307°W

West Midlands: Birmingham and the Black Country; Birmingham-Wolverhampton
- Conurbation
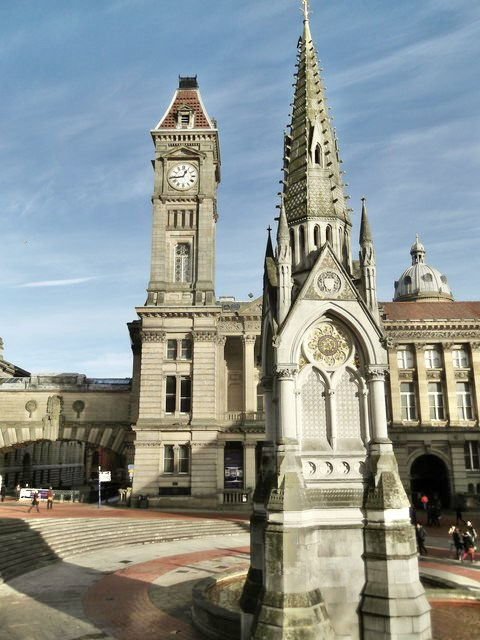
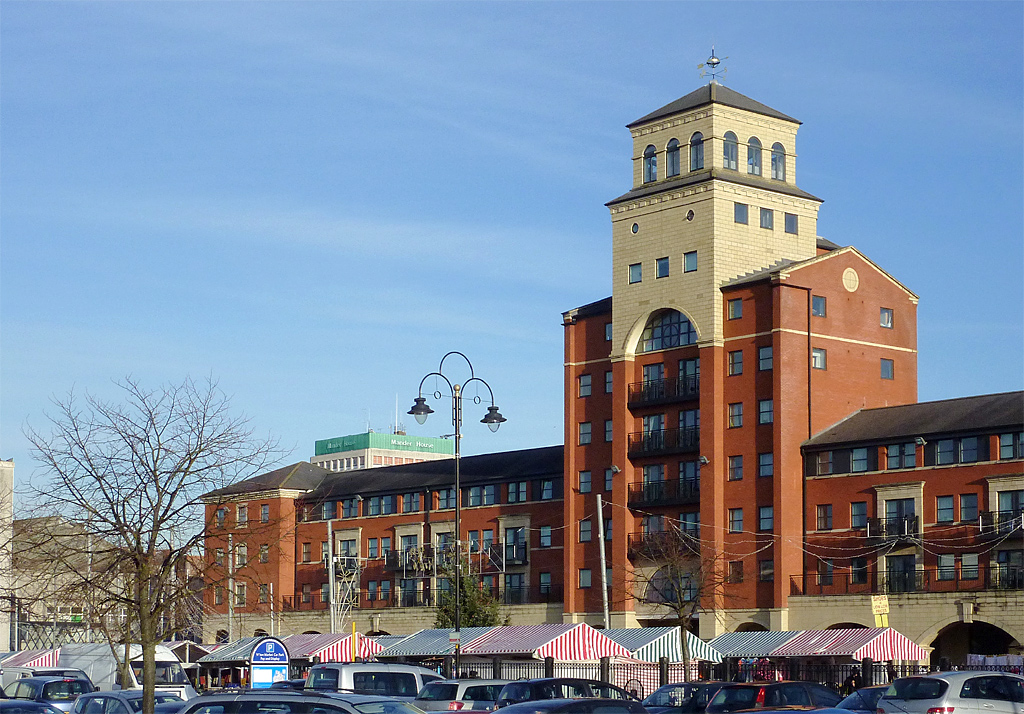
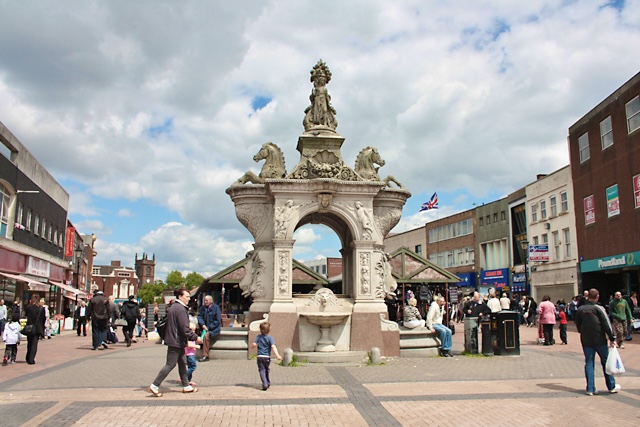
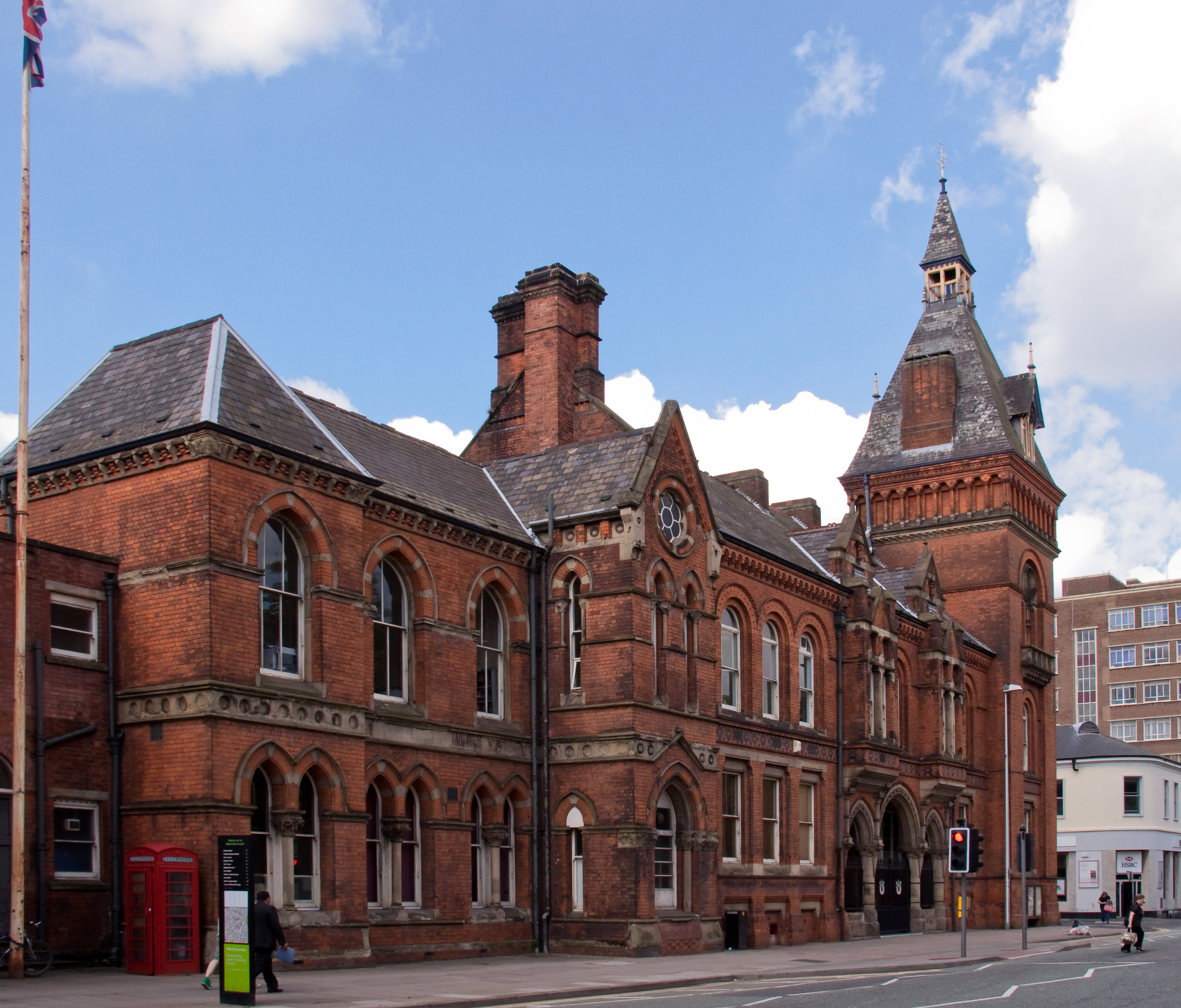
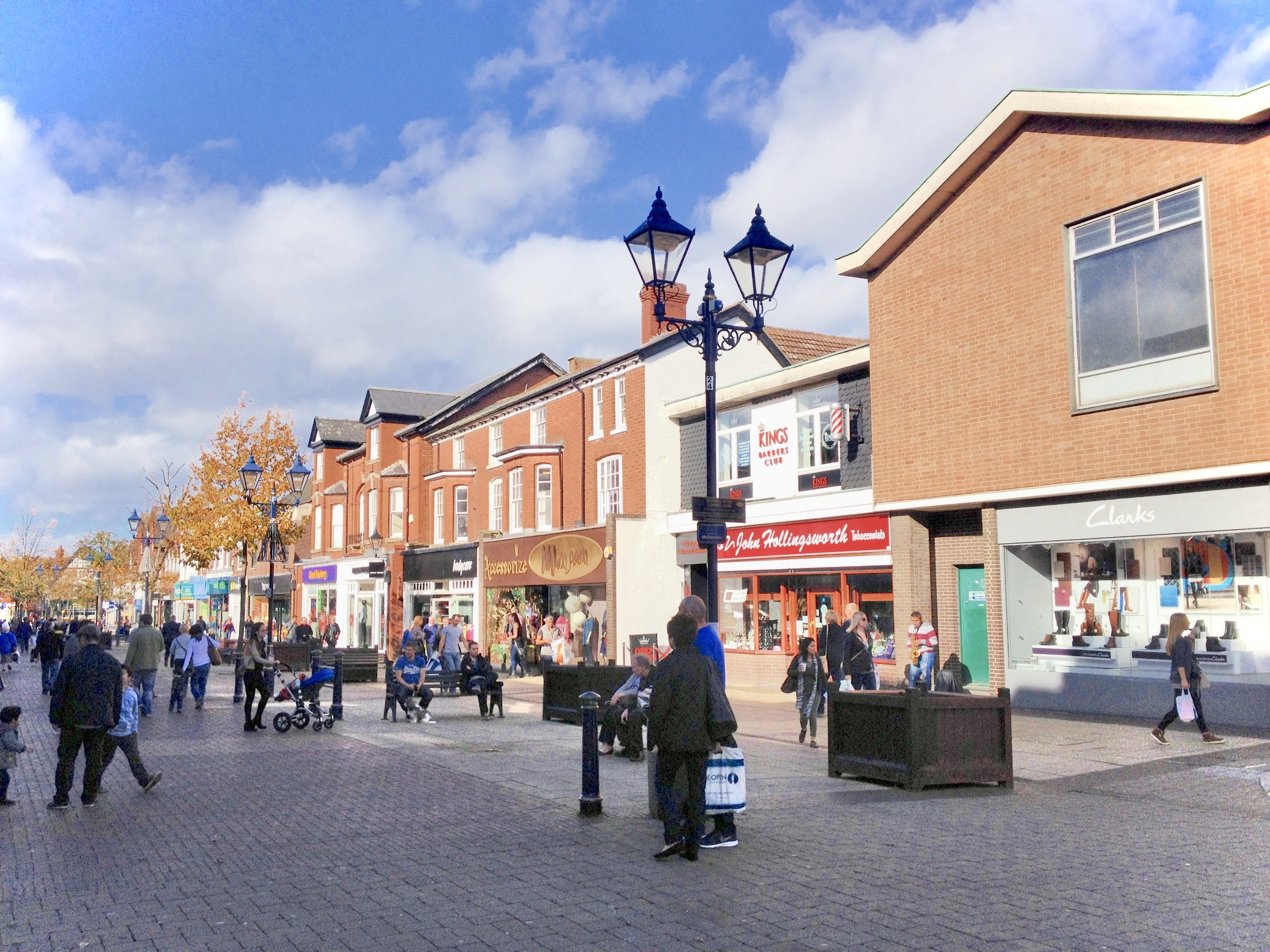
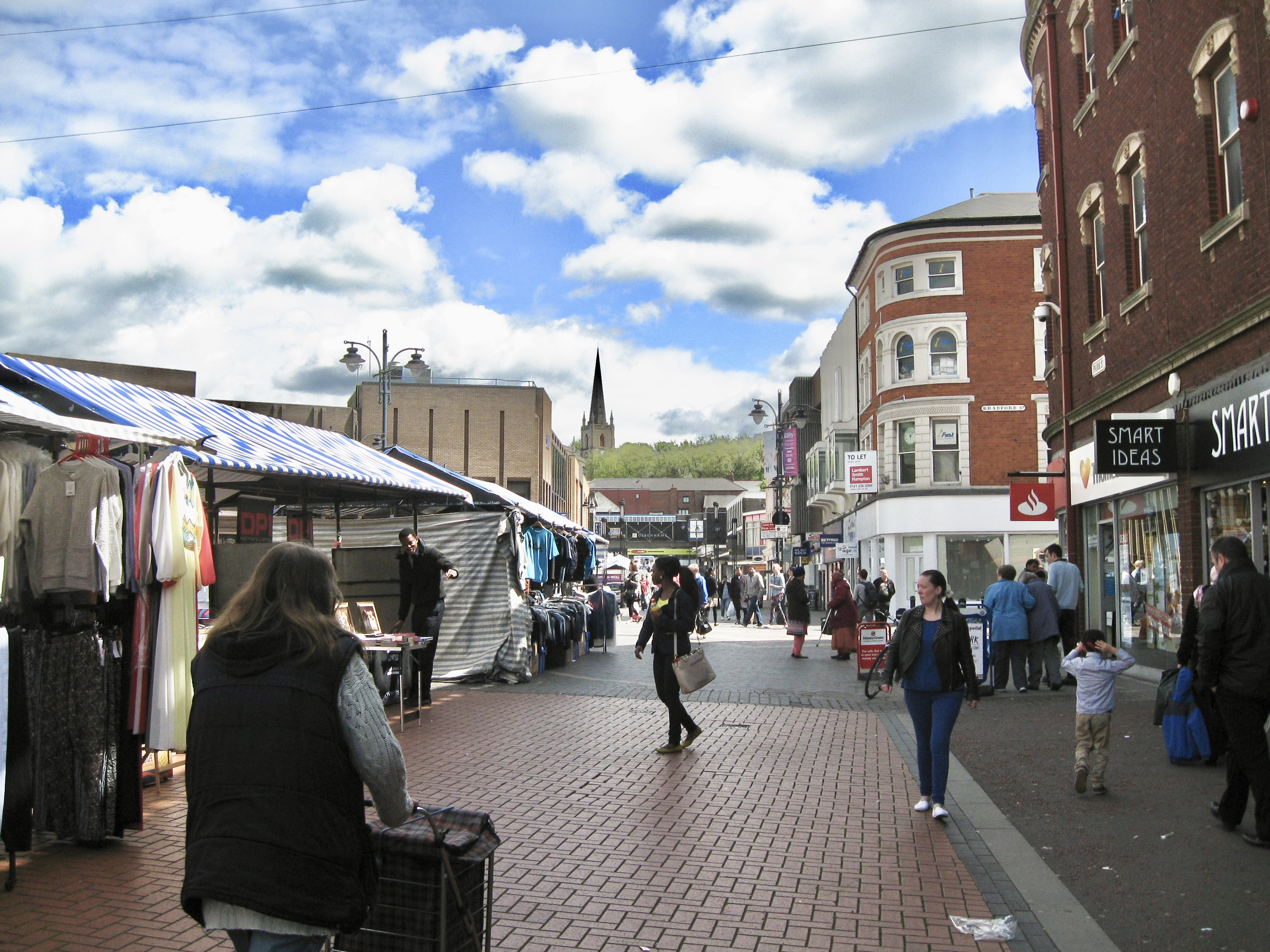
- Top: Birmingham and Wolverhampton; Lower: Dudley and West Bromwich; Bottom: Solihull and Walsall

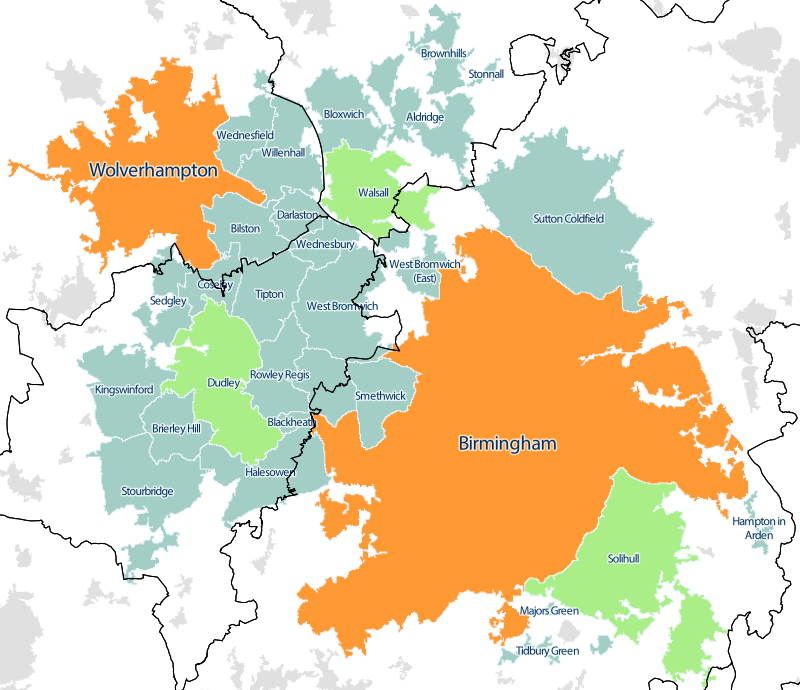
- Map of the West Midlands conurbation in 2011, with Travel to Work Areas overlaid. The five most populous are highlighted with Birmingham and Wolverhampton sub-divisions in orange and the Dudley, Walsall and Solihull sub-divisions in green.
- Sovereign state: United Kingdom
- Constituent country: England
- Largest settlements: (Pop. 100,000+): Birmingham; Dudley; Solihull; Sandwell; Wolverhampton; Walsall

Population (2011 census)
  - Total: 2,440,986
  - Rank: 3rd
- Time zone: UTC+0 (GMT)
  - Summer (DST): UTC+1 (BST)
- Postcode: B, DY, WS, WV
- Area codes: 0121, 01543, 01562, 01384, 01902, 01922

The West Midlands conurbation is a conurbation in the West Midlands region of England. The area consists of two cities and numerous towns: to the east, the city of Birmingham, along with adjacent towns of Solihull, Shirley, Chelmsley Wood, Fordbridge and Sutton Coldfield; and to the west, the city of Wolverhampton and the area called the Black Country, containing the towns of Dudley, Walsall, Brownhills, Bloxwich, Aldridge, West Bromwich, Oldbury, Cradley Heath, Lye, Willenhall, Bilston, Darlaston, Wednesfield, Tipton, Smethwick, Wednesbury, Rowley Regis, Netherton, Brierley Hill, Kingswinford, Sedgley, Stourbridge and Halesowen.

It is broken down into multiple Travel to Work Areas: Birmingham, Wolverhampton, Dudley & Sandwell, Walsall & Cannock, Hagley is within the Kidderminster area and the extreme south-east corner is within the Warwick & Stratford upon Avon area. The conurbation is mainly in the West Midlands county, including parts of the surrounding counties of Staffordshire (e.g. Little Aston, Perton and Essington) and Worcestershire (such as Hagley and Hollywood), with Coventry a separate area in the county.

According to the 2011 Census the area had a population of 2,440,986, making it the third most populated in the United Kingdom behind Greater London and Greater Manchester.

With the West Midlands also being a region and county, the conurbation is sometimes known as Birmingham-Wolverhampton. though it is the term Birmingham & The Black Country that has gained the widest traction as an alternative to the conurbation's official name: an example of this is the tagline used by BBC Radio WM - "The sound of Birmingham & The Black Country".

== Constituent parts ==
The West Midlands Urban Area as at the 2001 Census

Although the exact boundaries of any conurbation are open to debate, dependent on what criteria are used to determine where an urban area ceases, the Office for National Statistics defines the West Midlands Built Up Area as including the urban areas of Birmingham, Wolverhampton, Solihull, West Bromwich, Dudley, and Walsall amongst others. These settlements are not coterminous with the Metropolitan Boroughs of the same name.

Coventry is separated from the West Midlands conurbation by the Meriden Gap, and other urban areas, such as Cannock and Codsall remain separate from the conurbation. Coventry is 19 miles east of Birmingham.

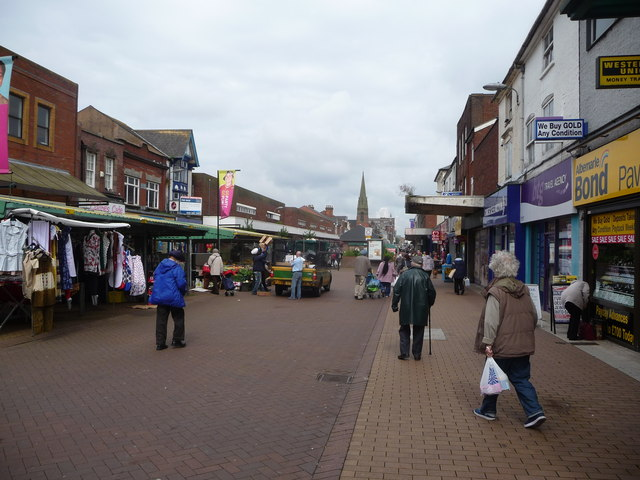
West Bromwich

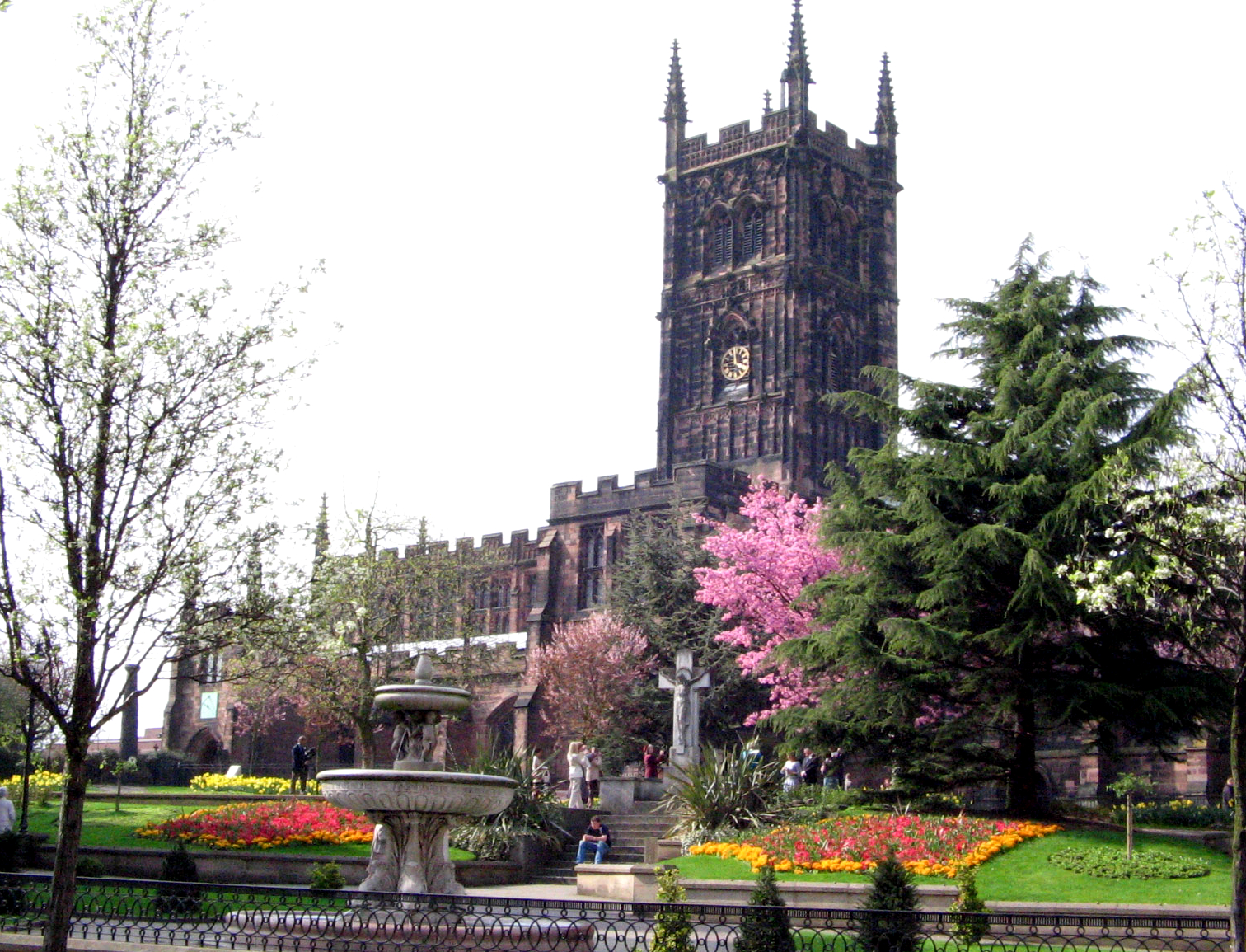
St Peter's Collegiate Church in Wolverhampton.

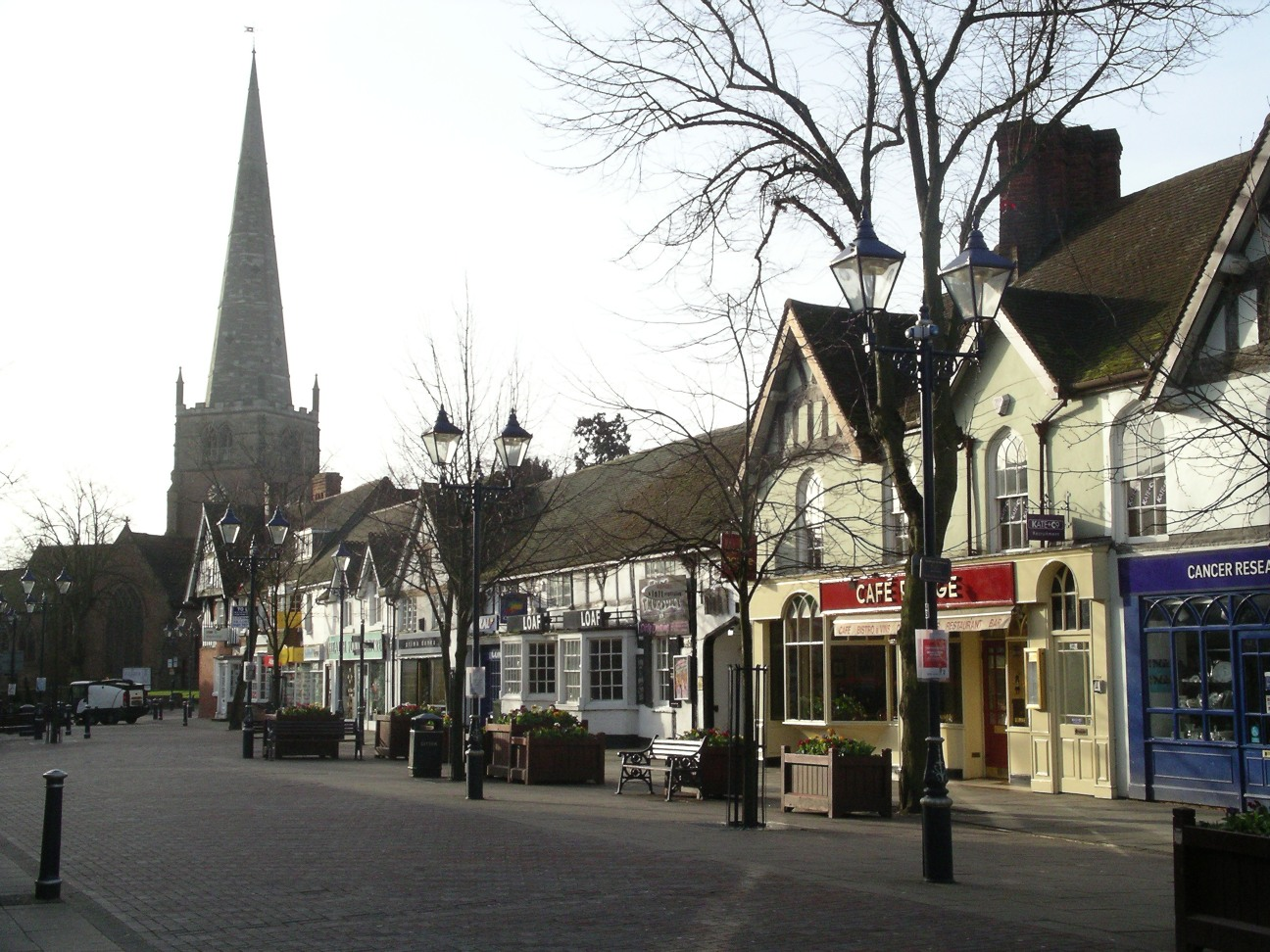
Solihull High Street.

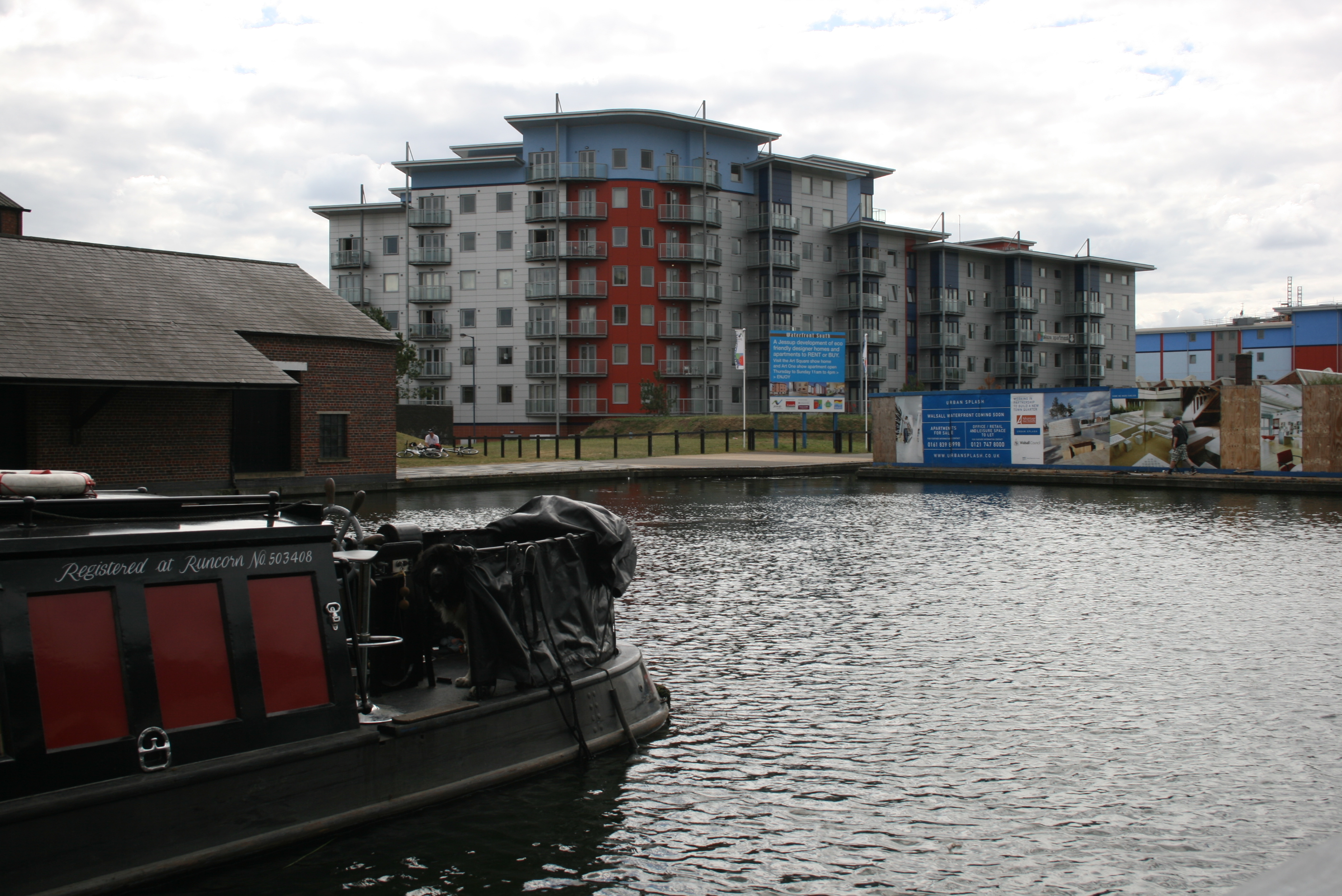
Walsall

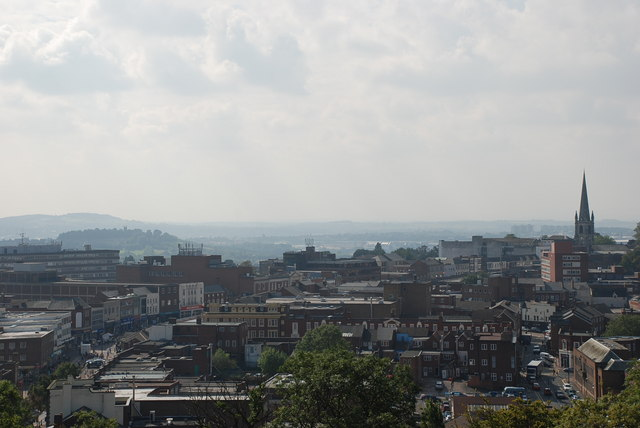
Dudley Town Centre.

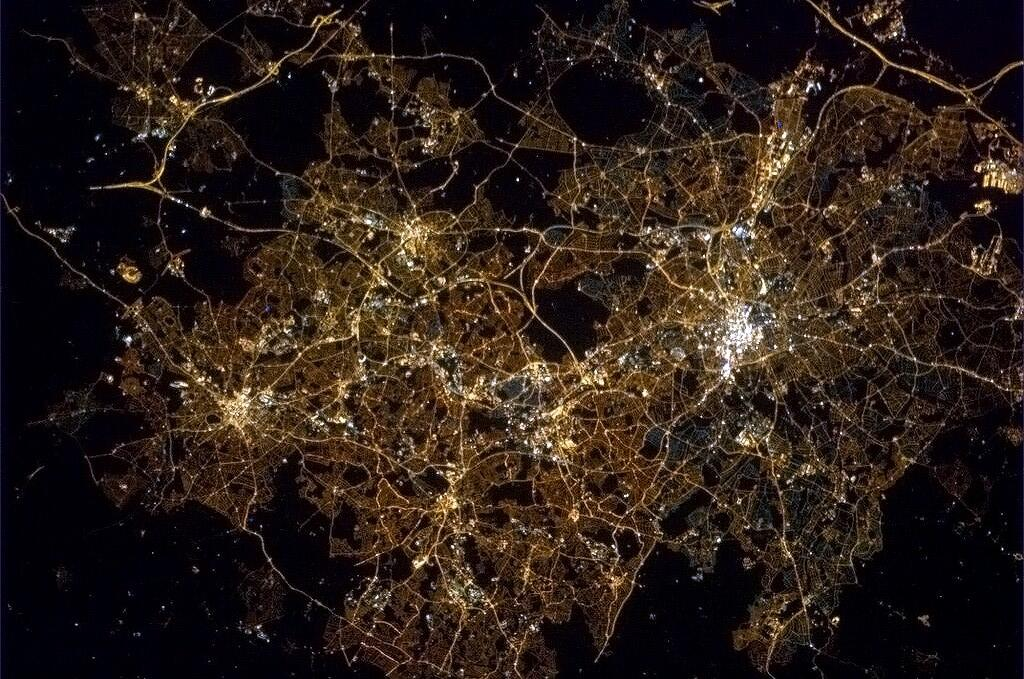
West Midlands conurbation at night from the ISS.

== Administration ==
Occasionally the conurbation is seen as being coterminous with the West Midlands Metropolitan county; however, this includes Coventry, which is separate from the main urban area, and excludes the parts of the surrounding counties of Staffordshire, Warwickshire and Worcestershire that fall within the conurbation.

For administrative purposes, the vast majority of the conurbation falls within the six Metropolitan Boroughs of Birmingham, Dudley, Sandwell, Solihull, Walsall and Wolverhampton.

Two Local enterprise partnerships (LEPs) cover the majority of the conurbation area: Black Country LEP comprises the local authorities of Dudley, Sandwell, Walsall and Wolverhampton while the Greater Birmingham & Solihull LEP includes those two authorities and a number of satellite boroughs, many remote from the conurbation and not traditionally associated with it (Bromsgrove, Cannock Chase, East Staffordshire, Lichfield, Redditch, Tamworth and Wyre Forest).

== Settlements ==
=== 2011 Census ===
The West Midlands Built Up Area consists of the below subdivisions. Due to the change in methodology between the 2001 and 2011 Census, and the amount of change between 2011 Census and previous census data, it is impossible to compare the data directly between 2011 and earlier Censuses.

Rank	Settlement	Population (2011)	Notes on significant changes since 2001
1	Birmingham	1,085,810	Gained Quinton from Oldbury-Smethwick USD. Gained Minworth from Sutton Coldfield USD.
2	Wolverhampton	210,319	Bilston and Wednesfield removed from 2001. The three BUASDs combined total 265,178. Essington removed and placed within Willenhall BUASD.
3	Solihull	123,187	Gained Shelly Green and Knowle-Bentley Heath from 2001.
4	Sutton Coldfield	95,107	
5	Dudley	79,379	Coseley, Kingswinford, Brierley Hill and Sedgley removed from 2011. The five BUASDs combined total 215,693. Gained Cradley Heath and Quarry Bank from Oldbury-Smethwick USD.
6	West Bromwich	72,945	Wednesbury and Tipton removed from 2001. Town split in two by Sandwell Valley and the two parts are now considered separately. The four BUASDs combined total 153,366. Gained Yew Tree from 2001.
7	Walsall	67,594	Willenhall, Darlaston and Bloxwich removed from 2001. The four BUASDs combined total 185,114.
8	Stourbridge	63,298	Gained Hagley from 2001.
9	Halesowen	58,135	
10	Willenhall	51,429	New in 2011. Previously part of Walsall USD, but also gained Essington from Wolverhampton USD.
11	Kingswinford	50,801	New in 2011. Previously part of Dudley USD.
12	Smethwick	48,765	New in 2011. Previously part of Oldbury-Smethwick USD.
13	Bloxwich	47,288	New in 2011. Previously part of Walsall USD.
13	Tipton	42,407	New in 2011. Previously part of West Bromwich USD.
14	Aldridge	39,463	Gained Rushall, Shelfield and Pelsall from 2001.
15	Rowley Regis	34,260	New in 2011. Previously part of Oldbury-Smethwick USD.
16	Brierley Hill	31,430	New in 2011. Previously part of Dudley USD.
17	Sedgley	30,979	New in 2011. Previously part of Dudley USD.
18	Bilston	29,556	New in 2011. Previously part of Wolverhampton USD.
19	Wednesfield	25,303	New in 2011. Previously part of Wolverhampton USD
20	Oldbury	23,964	New in 2011. Previously part of Oldbury-Smethwick USD.
21	Coseley	23,104	New in 2011. Previously part of Dudley USD.
22	Brownhills	20,373	
23	Wednesbury	19,029	New in 2011. Previously part of West Bromwich USD.
24	West Bromwich East	18,985	New in 2011. Previously part of West Bromwich USD.
25	Darlaston	18,803	New in 2011. Previously part of Walsall USD.
26	Blackheath	6,518	New in 2011. Previously part of Oldbury-Smethwick USD.
27	Cheswick Green	2,197	
28	Wythall	1,912	New in 2011.
29	Hampton in Arden	1,678	New in 2011.
30	Stonnall	1,338	New in 2011.
31	Major's Green	1,002	New in 2011.
32	Tidbury Green	720	New in 2011.

In the 2011 Census, Coleshill and Water Orton are two separate built-up areas with populations of 6,341 and 3,444 respectively. Prior to 2011, they were considered part of the West Midlands Urban Area.

=== Prior censuses ===
Prior to the 2011 census, the conurbation was known by the ONS as the West Midlands Urban Area, which contained the following Urban Sub-Divisions:

Rank (2001)	Settlement	Population (2001)	Population (1991)	Population (1981)
1	Birmingham	970,892	965,928	1,024,118
2	Wolverhampton	251,462	257,943	265,631
3	Dudley	194,919	192,171	187,367
4	Walsall	170,994	174,739	178,852
5	Oldbury / Smethwick	139,855	145,542	153,461
6	West Bromwich	136,940	146,386	154,531
7	Sutton Coldfield	105,452	106,001	103,097
8	Solihull	94,753	94,531	94,613
9	Stourbridge	55,480	55,624	55,499
10	Halesowen	55,273	57,918	57,532
11	Brownhills	19,866	18,159	18,200
12	Knowle / Bentley Heath	18,452		
13	Aldridge	15,659	16,832	17,589
14	Pelsall	10,524	10,007	10,328
15	Shelfield	6,807	7,079	6,029
16	Coleshill	6,235	6,324	
17	Yew Tree	6,109		
18	Rushall	5,864	5,871	6,137
19	Hagley	5,723	5,417	5,754
20	Shelly Green	5,702		
21	Water Orton	3,573	3,555	
22	Cheswick Green	2,261	2,511	
23	Knowle		17,588	16,872
24	Bentley Heath		5,984	

Notes:

- Knowle and Bentley Heath are considered as one settlement in 2001, but are considered separately in 1991 and 1981. Bentley Heath was not considered to be a settlement within the West Midlands Urban Area in 1981.
- Coleshill and Water Orton were not considered to be part of the West Midlands Urban Area in 1981, but a separate Coleshill/Water Orton Urban Area with a total population of 9,554; made up of Coleshill (6,113) and Water Orton (3,441).
- Yew Tree is only considered part of the West Midlands Urban Area in the 2001 census.
- Cheswick Green was not considered to be a settlement within the West Midlands Urban Area in 1981.
- Shelly Green was not considered to be a settlement within the West Midlands Urban Area in 1981 or 1991.

== See also ==
- List of areas in Birmingham
- List of areas in Dudley
- List of areas in Sandwell
- List of areas in the Metropolitan Borough of Walsall
- List of areas in Wolverhampton
