= Greater Birmingham =

Greater Birmingham can refer to:

- Birmingham, United Kingdom, and the area surrounding it, the West Midlands conurbation.
- Birmingham metropolitan area, Alabama, U.S.

== See also ==
- Greater Birmingham Scheme 1911
- Greater Birmingham and Solihull Local Enterprise Partnership
- West Midlands Combined Authority, which was referred to commonly as the Greater Birmingham Combined Authority during its formation.
