= 1995 Solihull Metropolitan Borough Council election =

1995 UK local government election

(1994 ←) 1995 United Kingdom local elections (→ 1996)

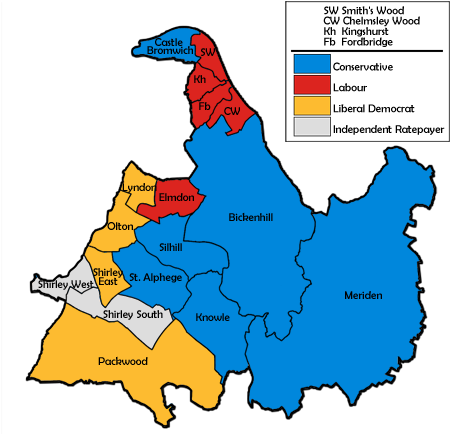
Map of the results for the 1995 Solihull council election.

The 1995 Solihull Metropolitan Borough Council elections were held on Thursday, 4 May 1995, with one third of the council to be elected. The council remained under no overall control with the Conservative and Independent Ratepayer and Residents coalition continuing. Voter turnout was 36.2%.

== Election result ==
Solihull local election result 1995
Party	Seats	Gains	Losses	Net gain/loss	Seats %	Votes %	Votes	+/−
Conservative	6	0	1	-1	35.3	32.4	18,203	-2.3
Labour	5	0	0	0	29.4	30.3	17,058	+4.1
Liberal Democrats	4	1	0	+1	23.5	28.0	15,752	-2.5
Independent Ratepayers & Residents	2	0	0	0	11.8	6.4	3,577	+0.4
Independent	0	0	0	0	0.0	2.1	1,168	-0.4
New Britain	0	0	0	0	0.0	0.7	402	+0.7
National Front	0	0	0	0	0.0	0.1	53	-0.1

This result had the following consequences for the total number of seats on the council after the elections:

Party	Previous council	New council
Conservatives	22	21
Labour	15	15
Liberal Democrat	8	9
Independent Ratepayers & Residents	5	5
Independent	1	1
Total	51	51
Working majority	-7	-9

== Ward results ==
Bickenhill
Party	Candidate	Votes	%	±%
Conservative	Peter Kellie	1,517	40.9	+6.4
Labour	Irma Shaw	1,421	38.3	−16.6
New Britain	Clifford Hards	402	10.8	+10.8
Liberal Democrats	Arthur Crossley	372	10.0	−0.7
Majority		96	2.6	−17.9
Turnout		3,712	38.2	−10.7
Conservative hold		Swing	+11.5	

Castle Bromwich
Party	Candidate	Votes	%	±%
Conservative	David Rees	1,779	48.9	−4.7
Labour	Brian Carter	1,534	42.2	+12.3
Liberal Democrats	Olive Hogg	323	8.9	−7.5
Majority		245	6.7	−17.0
Turnout		3,636	38.0	−7.6
Conservative hold		Swing	-8.5	

Chelmsley Wood
Party	Candidate	Votes	%	±%
Labour	Nicholas Stephens	1,512	74.6	+6.0
Conservative	Graham Juniper	312	15.4	−2.4
Liberal Democrats	C. Barber	204	10.1	−3.6
Majority		1,200	59.2	+8.3
Turnout		2,028	23.8	−5.8
Labour hold		Swing	+4.1	

Elmdon
Party	Candidate	Votes	%	±%
Labour	K. Llewellyn	2,125	59.3	+2.7
Conservative	E. Bailey	1,174	32.7	+2.2
Liberal Democrats	Jonathan Merkens	287	8.0	−4.9
Majority		951	26.5	+0.5
Turnout		3,586	44.0	−8.3
Labour hold		Swing	+0.3	

Fordbridge
Party	Candidate	Votes	%	±%
Labour	A. Hanley	1,191	75.0	+9.0
Conservative	Richard Hubbard	235	14.8	−2.9
Liberal Democrats	Bernard Wright	105	6.6	−2.4
Independent Ratepayers	John Rogers	56	3.5	−3.7
Majority		956	60.2	+12.0
Turnout		1,587	23.7	−6.8
Labour hold		Swing	+6.0	

Kingshurst
Party	Candidate	Votes	%	±%
Labour	David Threlkeld	1,281	70.9	+5.3
Conservative	Graham White	331	18.3	−4.6
Liberal Democrats	M. Dixon	194	10.7	−0.7
Majority		950	52.6	+9.9
Turnout		1,806	29.4	−6.4
Labour hold		Swing	+4.9	

Knowle
Party	Candidate	Votes	%	±%
Conservative	Don Blake	2,135	59.8	−0.6
Liberal Democrats	Jennifer Wright	928	26.0	−4.5
Labour	William Shaw	510	14.3	+5.2
Majority		1,207	33.8	+3.9
Turnout		3,573	40.5	−5.2
Conservative hold		Swing	+1.9	

Lyndon
Party	Candidate	Votes	%	±%
Liberal Democrats	Jill Puckering	1,991	63.9	−5.2
Labour	Ben Magee	618	19.8	+6.3
Conservative	Peter Duddy	508	16.3	−1.0
Majority		1,373	44.0	−7.7
Turnout		3,117	38.7	−7.6
Liberal Democrats hold		Swing	-5.7	

Meriden
Party	Candidate	Votes	%	±%
Conservative	Kenneth Allsopp	1,632	51.2	−8.2
Labour	Arthur Brill	848	26.6	+12.6
Liberal Democrats	Richard Morris	708	22.2	−4.3
Majority		784	24.6	−8.3
Turnout		3,188	36.7	−9.7
Conservative hold		Swing	-10.4	

Olton
Party	Candidate	Votes	%	±%
Liberal Democrats	Honor Cox	2,338	57.7	−0.5
Conservative	Michael Goodwin	1,344	33.2	−1.0
Labour	Ann Wood	372	9.2	+1.5
Majority		994	24.5	+0.4
Turnout		4,054	43.7	−5.2
Liberal Democrats gain from Conservative		Swing	+0.7	

Packwood
Party	Candidate	Votes	%	±%
Liberal Democrats	Judy Morris	2,782	60.6	+5.3
Conservative	Peter Radnall	1,522	33.2	−6.8
Labour	Michael Steed	286	6.2	+1.5
Majority		1,260	27.4	+12.2
Turnout		4,590	45.2	−6.5
Liberal Democrats hold		Swing	+6.1	

Shirley East
Party	Candidate	Votes	%	±%
Liberal Democrats	John Reeve	2,090	54.0	+2.6
Conservative	Richard Lewis	1,230	31.8	−3.2
Labour	Robert Houghton	553	14.3	+5.3
Majority		860	22.2	+5.8
Turnout		3,873	41.9	−8.3
Liberal Democrats hold		Swing	+2.9	

Shirley South
Party	Candidate	Votes	%	±%
Independent Ratepayers	James Eames	2,341	56.9	+2.0
Labour	Peter Ward	1,039	25.2	+12.0
Liberal Democrats	Declan Wilson	736	17.9	−13.9
Majority		1,302	31.6	+8.5
Turnout		4,116	30.9	−8.3
Independent Ratepayers hold		Swing	-5.0	

Shirley West
Party	Candidate	Votes	%	±%
Independent Ratepayers	Eric Pemberton	1,180	36.8	+9.0
Independent	Leslie Pitt	1,098	34.2	−3.9
Labour	Eric Collins	717	22.4	+6.2
Liberal Democrats	Anthony Verduyn	212	6.6	−11.3
Majority		82	2.6	−7.8
Turnout		3,207	34.5	−6.7
Independent Ratepayers hold		Swing	+6.4	

Silhill
Party	Candidate	Votes	%	±%
Conservative	Geoffrey Gibbons	1,673	43.0	−8.4
Liberal Democrats	Susan Balmer	1,345	34.6	+5.3
Labour	Donald Bargery	819	21.1	+5.0
National Front	Norman Tomkinson	53	1.4	−1.8
Majority		328	8.4	−13.7
Turnout		3,890	39.0	−7.7
Conservative hold		Swing	-6.8	

Smith's Wood
Party	Candidate	Votes	%	±%
Labour	Donald Cornock	1,602	77.1	+6.8
Conservative	Timothy Vernon	253	12.2	−5.6
Liberal Democrats	Irene Chamberlain	154	7.4	−4.6
Independent	Norman Harper	70	3.4	+3.4
Majority		1,349	64.9	+12.4
Turnout		2,079	24.6	−6.8
Labour hold		Swing	+6.2	

St. Alphege
Party	Candidate	Votes	%	±%
Conservative	Ronald Herd	2,558	61.3	−4.2
Liberal Democrats	Brenda Chapple	983	23.6	−2.6
Labour	Janet Fletcher	630	15.1	+6.8
Majority		1,575	37.8	−1.6
Turnout		4,171	38.1	−9.5
Conservative hold		Swing	-0.8	
