= 1996 Solihull Metropolitan Borough Council election =

1996 UK local government election

(1995 ←) 1996 United Kingdom local elections (→ 1998)

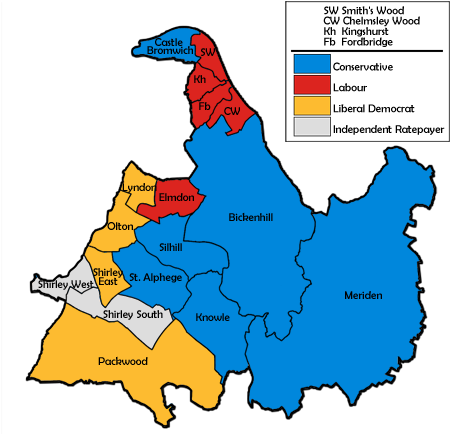
Map of the results for the 1996 Solihull council election.

The 1996 Solihull Metropolitan Borough Council elections were held on Thursday, 2 May 1996, with one third of the council to be elected. The council remained under no overall control, with the Conservatives and Independent Ratepayer and Residents no longer holding enough seats to continue their coalition. Voter turnout was 35.4%.

== Election result ==
Solihull local election result 1996
Party	Seats	Gains	Losses	Net gain/loss	Seats %	Votes %	Votes	+/−
Conservative	6	0	4	-4	35.3	37.1	20,481	+4.7
Labour	5	1	0	+1	29.4	26.9	14,821	-3.4
Liberal Democrats	4	3	0	+3	23.5	25.7	14,190	-2.3
Independent Ratepayers & Residents	2	0	0	0	11.8	8.0	4,419	+1.6
Ind. Conservative	0	0	0	0	0.0	1.7	958	+1.7
Independent	0	0	0	0	0.0	0.5	276	-1.6

This result had the following consequences for the total number of seats on the council after the elections:

Party	Previous council	New council
Conservatives	21	17
Labour	15	16
Liberal Democrat	9	12
Independent Ratepayers & Residents	5	5
Independent	1	1
Total	51	51
Working majority	-9	-17

== Ward results ==
Bickenhill
Party	Candidate	Votes	%	±%
Conservative	Elizabeth Plaister	1,667	48.3	+7.4
Labour	Brian Carter	1,282	37.1	−1.1
Independent	Clifford Hards	276	8.0	+8.0
Liberal Democrats	M. Dixon	228	6.6	−3.4
Majority		385	11.1	+8.6
Turnout		3,453	34.6	−3.6
Conservative hold		Swing	+4.2	

Castle Bromwich
Party	Candidate	Votes	%	±%
Conservative	George Richards	2,140	59.6	+10.7
Labour	Vera Wood	1,128	31.4	−10.8
Liberal Democrats	Jonathan Merkens	321	8.9	+0.1
Majority		1,012	28.2	+21.5
Turnout		3,589	37.6	−0.4
Conservative hold		Swing	+10.7	

Chelmsley Wood
Party	Candidate	Votes	%	±%
Labour	Alfred Hill	1,329	73.2	−1.3
Conservative	Graham Juniper	343	18.9	+3.5
Liberal Democrats	C. Barber	143	7.9	−2.2
Majority		986	54.3	−4.8
Turnout		1,815	21.8	−2.0
Labour hold		Swing	-2.4	

Elmdon
Party	Candidate	Votes	%	±%
Labour	Ann Littley	1,937	55.0	−4.3
Conservative	Donald Jones	1,274	36.2	+3.4
Liberal Democrats	A. Blakeley	312	8.9	+0.8
Majority		663	18.8	−7.7
Turnout		3,523	43.5	−0.5
Labour hold		Swing	-3.8	

Fordbridge
Party	Candidate	Votes	%	±%
Labour	Michael Corser	970	70.6	−4.4
Conservative	T. O'Riordan	238	17.3	+2.5
Liberal Democrats	Jennifer Wright	96	7.0	+0.4
Independent Ratepayers	John Rogers	70	5.1	+1.6
Majority		732	53.3	−7.0
Turnout		1,374	21.0	−2.7
Labour hold		Swing	-3.5	

Kingshurst
Party	Candidate	Votes	%	±%
Labour	Janet Fletcher	1,035	65.3	−5.6
Conservative	Dorothy Wallace	414	26.1	+7.8
Liberal Democrats	H. Edgington	136	8.6	−2.2
Majority		621	39.2	−13.4
Turnout		1,585	25.9	−3.5
Labour hold		Swing	-6.7	

Knowle
Party	Candidate	Votes	%	±%
Conservative	Leslie Kyles	2,163	63.8	+4.0
Liberal Democrats	Bernard Wright	796	23.5	−2.5
Labour	William Shaw	433	12.8	−1.5
Majority		1,367	40.3	+6.5
Turnout		3,392	37.4	−3.1
Conservative hold		Swing	+3.2	

Lyndon
Party	Candidate	Votes	%	±%
Liberal Democrats	Irene Chamberlain	1,738	58.0	−5.8
Conservative	Neill Watts	672	22.4	+6.1
Labour	Eric Collins	585	19.5	−0.3
Majority		1,066	35.6	−8.5
Turnout		2,995	37.4	−1.3
Liberal Democrats hold		Swing	-6.0	

Meriden
Party	Candidate	Votes	%	±%
Conservative	Alan Vincent	1,365	37.9	−13.3
Ind. Conservative	M. Emm	958	26.6	+26.6
Labour	Arthur Brill	827	22.9	−3.6
Liberal Democrats	Richard Morris	454	12.6	−9.6
Majority		407	11.3	−13.3
Turnout		3,604	41.2	+4.5
Conservative hold		Swing	-19.9	

Olton
Party	Candidate	Votes	%	±%
Liberal Democrats	Norman Davies	2,150	52.8	−4.8
Conservative	Diana Holl-Allen	1,622	39.9	+6.7
Labour	Frederick Nash	297	7.3	−1.9
Majority		528	13.0	−11.5
Turnout		4,069	43.3	−0.4
Liberal Democrats gain from Conservative		Swing	-5.7	

Packwood
Party	Candidate	Votes	%	±%
Liberal Democrats	Anthony Dupont	2,178	48.3	−12.3
Conservative	Kenneth Meeson	2,099	46.5	+13.3
Labour	Irma Shaw	236	5.2	−1.0
Majority		79	1.7	−25.7
Turnout		4,513	43.9	−1.3
Liberal Democrats gain from Conservative		Swing	-12.8	

Shirley East
Party	Candidate	Votes	%	±%
Liberal Democrats	June Gandy	1,942	49.7	−4.3
Conservative	Theresa Samuels	1,444	36.9	+5.2
Labour	James Burman	523	13.4	−0.9
Majority		498	12.7	−9.5
Turnout		3,909	41.9	+0.0
Liberal Democrats gain from Conservative		Swing	-4.7	

Shirley South
Party	Candidate	Votes	%	±%
Independent Ratepayers Anti European Union	Ursula Eames	2,489	61.6	+4.7
Labour	Peter Ward	927	22.9	−2.3
Liberal Democrats	D. Wilson	627	15.5	−2.4
Majority		1,562	38.6	+7.0
Turnout		4,043	30.0	−0.9
Independent Ratepayers hold		Swing	+3.5	

Shirley West
Party	Candidate	Votes	%	±%
Independent Ratepayers	Keith Williamson	1,860	62.8	+26.0
Labour	Peter Metcalfe	781	26.4	+4.0
Liberal Democrats	Anthony Verduyn	322	10.9	+4.3
Majority		1,079	36.4	+33.9
Turnout		2,963	32.1	−2.4
Independent Ratepayers hold		Swing	+11.0	

Silhill
Party	Candidate	Votes	%	±%
Conservative	Peter Hogarth	1,985	47.9	+4.9
Liberal Democrats	David Puckering	1,568	37.8	+3.3
Labour	Donald Bargery	591	14.3	−6.8
Majority		417	10.1	+1.6
Turnout		4,144	41.1	+2.1
Conservative hold		Swing	+0.8	

Smith's Wood
Party	Candidate	Votes	%	±%
Labour	Graham Craig	1,393	73.9	−3.2
Conservative	Timothy Vernon	328	17.4	+5.2
Liberal Democrats	Olive Hogg	164	8.7	+1.3
Majority		1,065	56.5	−8.4
Turnout		1,885	22.6	−2.0
Labour hold		Swing	-4.2	

St. Alphege
Party	Candidate	Votes	%	±%
Conservative	Nicholas Worley	2,727	63.6	+2.2
Liberal Democrats	Brenda Chapple	1,015	23.7	+0.1
Labour	Paul Tuxworth	547	12.8	−2.3
Majority		1,712	39.9	+2.2
Turnout		4,289	38.5	+0.4
Conservative hold		Swing	+1.1	

== By-elections between 1996 and 1998 ==
Castle Bromwich by-election 18 July 1996
Party	Candidate	Votes	%	±%
Conservative		1,490	59.0	−0.6
Labour		794	31.5	+0.1
Liberal Democrats		236	9.4	+0.5
Majority		696	27.5	−0.7
Turnout		2,520	26.2	−11.4
Conservative hold		Swing	-0.3	

Fordbridge by-election 24 October 1996
Party	Candidate	Votes	%	±%
Labour		525	72.7	+2.1
Conservative		104	14.4	−2.9
Independent Ratepayer		56	7.8	+2.7
Liberal Democrats		37	5.1	−1.9
Majority		421	58.3	+5.0
Turnout		722	11.0	−10.0
Labour hold		Swing	+2.5	

Kingshurst by-election 16 October 1997
Party	Candidate	Votes	%	±%
Labour		345	62.5	−2.8
Conservative		175	31.7	+5.6
Liberal Democrats		32	5.8	−2.8
Majority		170	30.8	−8.4
Turnout		552	16.6	−9.3
Labour hold		Swing	-4.2	

Silhill by-election 16 October 1997
Party	Candidate	Votes	%	±%
Conservative		1,328	46.1	−1.8
Liberal Democrats		1,235	42.9	+5.1
Labour		301	10.5	−3.8
Other		16	0.5	+0.5
Majority		93	3.2	−6.9
Turnout		2,880	28.1	−13.0
Conservative hold		Swing	-3.4	
