= Meriden and Solihull East =

UK Parliament constituency (since 2024)

Coordinates: 52.42°N 1.69°W

- County constituency for the House of Commons
- Boundaries since 2024
- Boundary of Meriden and Solihull East in West Midlands region
- County: West Midlands county
- Electorate: 74,211 (2023)
- Major settlements: Solihull (part), Dorridge, Meriden, Chelmsley Wood

Current constituency
- Created: 2024
- Member of Parliament: Saqib Bhatti (Conservative)
- Seats: One
- Created from: Meriden (majority); Solihull (minority)

Meriden and Solihull East is a constituency of the House of Commons in the UK Parliament. Further to the 2023 periodic review of Westminster constituencies, it was first contested in the 2024 general election. It is represented by Conservative Party member Saqib Bhatti, who was MP for the predecessor seat of Meriden from 2019 to 2024.

The constituency name refers to the village of Meriden and the eastern areas of the Metropolitan Borough of Solihull. This is part of a boundary review that resulted in the Meriden constituency being split into three.

== Constituency profile ==
Meriden and Solihull East is a constituency in the West Midlands county. It covers the eastern parts of the Borough of Solihull and the Meriden Gap; the rural area between Solihull and the city of Coventry. Settlements in the constituency include the Solihull neighbourhood of Elmdon Heath, the town of Chelmsley Wood, the connected villages of Dorridge, Bentley Heath and Knowle, and the villages of Balsall Common and Meriden.

This is a mostly suburban and rural constituency, and its position close to the cities of Birmingham and Coventry makes it popular with retirees and middle-class commuters. It contains Birmingham Airport and the National Exhibition Centre. The constituency is generally wealthy and affluent, especially in the villages in the south. However, Chelmsley Wood is highly-deprived; it is a large council estate that was built in the late 1960s to rehouse people from Birmingham. The average house price in the constituency is higher than the national average and considerably higher than the West Midlands regional average.

In general, residents of Meriden and Solihull East are older and have high rates of homeownership. They have average levels of education, but household income is high and a large proportion of residents work in the business administration and transport sectors. Rates of unemployment and child poverty in the constituency are average. White people made up 86% of the population at the 2021 census.

At the local borough council, Elmdon Heath and Chelmsley Wood are mostly represented by Reform UK, whilst the rural areas in the Meriden Gap elected primarily Conservatives. An estimated 57% of voters in Meriden and Solihull East supported leaving the European Union in the 2016 referendum, higher than the nationwide figure of 52%.

== Boundaries ==
=== 2024–present ===
The constituency is composed of the following (as they existed on 1 December 2020):

- The Metropolitan Borough of Solihull wards of: Bickenhill; Chelmsley Wood; Dorridge and Hockley Heath; Elmdon; Kingshurst and Fordbridge; Knowle; Meriden; Silhill.

It was created from the following areas:

- The majority (74.5%) of the previous Meriden constituency (abolished)
- Elmdon and Silhill wards (25.5%) from the previous Solihull constituency (abolished)

In addition to Meriden, the constituency also contains Birmingham Airport and the National Exhibition Centre (NEC), which are in the Bickenhill ward.

== Members of Parliament ==
Meriden prior to 2024

Election	Member	Party
2024	Saqib Bhatti	Conservative

== Elections ==
=== Elections in the 2020s ===
General election 2024: Meriden and Solihull East
Party	Candidate	Votes	%	±%
Conservative	Saqib Bhatti	16,792	38.1	▼24.3
Labour	Sarah Alan	12,208	27.7	▲6.9
Reform	Malcolm Sedgley	8,753	19.9	N/A
Liberal Democrats	Sunny Virk	3,353	7.6	▼6.0
Green	Shesh Sheshabhatter	2,929	6.7	▲3.5
Majority		4,584	10.4	▼31.2
Turnout		44,035	59.8	▼4.8
Conservative hold		Swing	▼15.6	

Changes are from the notional results of the 2019 election on the new boundaries.

- Saqib Bhatti (Conservative) was previously MP for Meriden

== See also ==
- List of parliamentary constituencies in the West Midlands (county)
- List of parliamentary constituencies in West Midlands (region)
