= Fisher's Tale =

- Origin: Ware, Barnet, Sussex, Kent (UK)
- Genres: Folk rock, Contemporary Christian music
- Years active: 1996-2010
- Members: Adrian Burr – Lead guitar, Violin; Abbie Cordial – Lead vocals, Keyboards, Percussion; Darren Cordial – Drums, Percussion, Keyboards; Nathanael Stock – Rhythm guitar, Vocals; Peter Gaston – Organ, Piano, Flute, Saxophone
- Past members: Andrew Delin; Andrew De Witt; Coren Miles; David Fenton; Debby Fenton; Richard Downton; Sarah Downton; Tim Stephens
- Website: www.fisherstale.co.uk

Fisher's Tale were a Christian (Christadelphian) folk rock band, based in the United Kingdom. They released five studio albums over a fourteen-year period.

== Name ==
The band's name is captured in the title of the debut album: "Why didn't you tell me... the fisher's tale?". The "fisher" referred to the fisherman Peter, telling a tale of what happened in the early first century CE. The original band had an a cappella song called "The fisher's tale" which only existed as a demo version.

== History ==
The group started in the early 1990s when a Music and Drama workshop was started in Ware (Hertfordshire UK), under the direction of Mark Gates. The workshop was intended to bring together young people's talents with the aim of expressing aspects of the Christian message in different art forms. After some time the workshop organisers decided that a fixed membership music group would have a greater opportunity to write and present music than a variable workshop attendance, some attendees having other commitments (Richard Gates, Becky Chambers, Adrian Burr).

From 1993 the group performed as 'Not yet band' until the name Fisher's Tale was chosen during a tea break at rehearsals in Barnet. Andrew De Witt and Tim Stephens, from the earlier band Six of One, were involved from the outset, contributing to the folk-rock influence of the music. De Witt played in the early live performances and was a significant source of songwriting talent, with his contributions appearing on several albums.

== Original lineup ==
The original members of the band were:

- Andrew Delin: Acoustic & electric guitar, bass, vocals
- Coren Tanner: Keyboard, bassoon, vocals
- David Fenton: Vocals
- Debby Fenton: Saxophone
- Richard Downton: Percussion
- Sarah Downton: Bass guitar, vocals
- Tim Stephens: Drums

From the outset the band had a strong performance ethic, combining musical performance with audio-visual presentation and dramatic reading. Part of the original philosophy for Fisher's Tale was to operate as a music project (The Fisher's Tale Music Project, "FTMP"), allowing for changing membership and ongoing output through the life of the project (1996-2010).

== Why Didn't You Tell Me? ==
The original group recorded the debut album, Why Didn't You Tell Me? which was released in 1996. The album was digitally mastered but produced to cassette only. Rumours of a digital release of the original album have not been confirmed.

Following the release of the first album, Delin and Tanner, two founding members, left the band. Richard Downton moved to acoustic rhythm guitar and vocals.

== Written in Rock ==
In 2000, original drummer Tim Stephens left the group and Richard Downton moved to drums in addition to guitar and vocals. Adrian Burr, from the original Ware music workshop, re-joined as lead guitarist, bringing more of a rock style to the band's sound. The band recorded Written in Rock in 1999. Following the album, Pete Howarth joined as rhythm guitarist.

Following Written in Rock, Richard & Sarah Downton left the group. David Fenton and Adrian Burr recruited Darren Cordial on drums, and Abbie Downer to share lead vocals with Nathanael Stock on rhythm guitar. The new talent allowed the group to progress in new directions. In 2001, Fisher's Tale became a six-piece with Peter Gaston on keyboard.

== Boundless ==
In 2003, Fisher's Tale recorded their 3rd album, Boundless, with guest musician Anna Ryder on cello. Later that year Simeon Kay joined as bass guitarist, and founding member David Fenton resigned.

== Different Horizon ==
In 2005, the band changed musical direction with the release of its 4th album, Different Horizon.

== United Song ==
After a sabbatical in 2006, Fisher's Tale resumed playing to live audiences around the UK. An open-air concert in May 2009 introduced new songs to the set. The 5th album, United Song, was launched on 5 June 2010 at a concert in Knowle, England, with the band playing songs from previous albums, alongside all 12 songs from the new project.

Following the release of United Song in 2010, Simeon and Jo Kay resigned, and Peter and Julia Gaston emigrated to Australia.

== Representation ==
Fisher's Tale maintains independent control of its content. Albums and tracks can be downloaded from iTunes and CDs are available through its website (http://fisherstale.co.uk/).

== Discography ==
- 1996: Why Didn't You Tell Me?
- 1999: Written in Rock
- 2003: Boundless
- 2005: Different Horizon
- 2010: United Song
