= 1994 Solihull Metropolitan Borough Council election =

1994 UK local government election

(1992 ←) 1994 United Kingdom local elections (→ 1995)

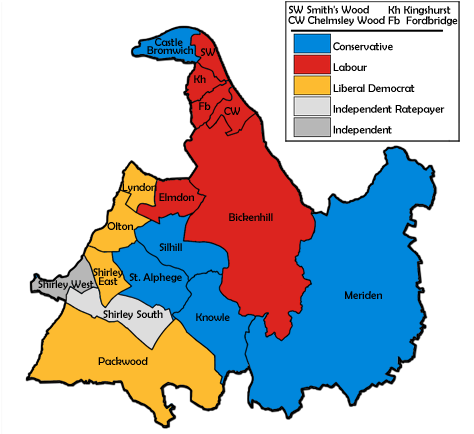
Map of the results for the 1994 Solihull council election.

The 1994 Solihull Metropolitan Borough Council elections were held on Thursday, 5 May 1994, with one third of the council and a double vacancy in Fordbridge to be elected. The council remained under no overall control with the Conservatives seven seats short of a majority. Voter turnout was 43.6%.

== Election result ==
Solihull local election result 1994
Party	Seats	Gains	Losses	Net gain/loss	Seats %	Votes %	Votes	+/−
Labour	7	0	0	0	38.9	26.2	17,764	+9.4
Conservative	5	0	2	-2	27.8	34.7	23,559	-22.3
Liberal Democrats	4	2	0	+2	22.2	30.5	20,698	+15.0
Independent Ratepayers & Residents	1	0	0	0	5.5	6.0	4,065	-2.8
Independent	1	0	0	0	5.5	2.5	1,677	+2.5
National Front	0	0	0	0	0.0	0.2	150	+0.2

This result had the following consequences for the total number of seats on the council after the elections:

Party	Previous council	New council
Conservatives	24	22
Labour	15	15
Liberal Democrats	6	8
Independent Ratepayers & Residents	5	5
Independent	1	1
Total	51	51
Working majority	-3	-7

== Ward results ==
Bickenhill
Party	Candidate	Votes	%	±%
Labour	James Ryan	2,624	54.9	+23.1
Conservative	T. Young	1,646	34.4	−28.7
Liberal Democrats	A. Blakeley	513	10.7	+10.7
Majority		978	20.4	−10.8
Turnout		4,783	48.9	+8.2
Labour hold		Swing	+25.9	

Castle Bromwich
Party	Candidate	Votes	%	±%
Conservative	Beryl Bennett	2,351	53.7	−24.1
Labour	Derek Jones	1,310	29.9	+10.8
Liberal Democrats	Olive Hogg	719	16.4	+16.4
Majority		1,041	23.8	−34.9
Turnout		4,380	45.6	+5.7
Conservative hold		Swing	-17.4	

Chelmsley Wood
Party	Candidate	Votes	%	±%
Labour	Robert Reed	1,750	68.6	+15.2
Conservative	Graham Juniper	453	17.7	−20.8
Liberal Democrats	C. Barber	349	13.7	+5.6
Majority		1,297	50.8	+36.1
Turnout		2,552	29.6	+8.9
Labour hold		Swing	+18.0	

Elmdon
Party	Candidate	Votes	%	±%
Labour	Sheila Brookes	2,437	56.5	+18.6
Conservative	D. Wilkes	1,317	30.5	−18.6
Liberal Democrats	J. Jardine	557	12.9	+12.9
Majority		1,120	26.0	+14.7
Turnout		4,311	52.3	+7.8
Labour hold		Swing	+18.6	

Fordbridge
Party	Candidate	Votes	%	±%
Labour	Arthur Harper	1,343	66.0	+9.1
Labour	Ben Magee	1,079		
Conservative	Keith Samuels	361	17.7	−17.4
Liberal Democrats	Bernard Wright	184	9.0	+1.1
Liberal Democrats	Jennifer Wright	157		
Independent Ratepayers	M. Hitchcock	147	7.2	+7.2
Majority		982	48.3	+26.5
Turnout		2,035	30.5	+10.2
Labour hold		Swing		
Labour hold		Swing	+13.2	

Kingshurst
Party	Candidate	Votes	%	±%
Labour	Jeffrey Potts	1,478	65.6	+10.4
Conservative	Don Blake	517	22.9	−17.9
Liberal Democrats	A. Frost	258	11.4	+11.4
Majority		961	42.6	+28.3
Turnout		2,253	35.8	+8.5
Labour hold		Swing	+14.1	

Knowle
Party	Candidate	Votes	%	±%
Conservative	Geoffrey Wright	2,424	60.4	−14.6
Liberal Democrats	Arthur Crossley	1,224	30.5	+10.6
Labour	Vera Wood	365	9.1	+4.0
Majority		1,200	29.9	−25.2
Turnout		4,013	45.7	+2.7
Conservative hold		Swing	-12.6	

Lyndon
Party	Candidate	Votes	%	±%
Liberal Democrats	Norman Chapple	2,577	69.1	+17.1
Conservative	Peter Duddy	646	17.3	−21.7
Labour	J. Stanley	505	13.5	+4.6
Majority		1,931	51.8	+38.8
Turnout		3,728	46.3	+4.9
Liberal Democrats hold		Swing	+19.4	

Meriden
Party	Candidate	Votes	%	±%
Conservative	Peter Lea	2,392	59.4	−9.7
Liberal Democrats	Richard Morris	1,067	26.5	+3.8
Labour	Jacqueline Moore	565	14.0	+5.8
Majority		1,325	32.9	−13.5
Turnout		4,024	46.4	+7.6
Conservative hold		Swing	-6.7	

Olton
Party	Candidate	Votes	%	±%
Liberal Democrats	John Windmill	2,631	58.2	+14.7
Conservative	Nicholas Worley	1,542	34.1	−18.4
Labour	Joan Holt	346	7.7	+3.6
Majority		1,089	24.1	+15.1
Turnout		4,519	48.9	+2.5
Liberal Democrats hold		Swing	+16.5	

Packwood
Party	Candidate	Votes	%	±%
Liberal Democrats	Peter Lee	2.865	55.3	+20.5
Conservative	Peter Llewellyn	2,073	40.0	−22.5
Labour	Michael Steed	244	4.7	+2.0
Majority		792	15.3	−12.5
Turnout		5,182	51.7	+3.4
Liberal Democrats gain from Conservative		Swing	+21.5	

Shirley East
Party	Candidate	Votes	%	±%
Liberal Democrats	Michael Southcombe	2,388	51.3	+11.4
Conservative	Richard Lewis	1,626	34.9	−19.4
Labour	Robert Houghton	416	8.9	+3.2
Independent	Leslie Pitt	224	4.8	+4.8
Majority		762	16.4	+1.9
Turnout		4,654	50.2	+6.0
Liberal Democrats gain from Conservative		Swing	+15.4	

Shirley South
Party	Candidate	Votes	%	±%
Independent Ratepayers	Richard Jackson	2,859	54.9	+54.9
Liberal Democrats	Richard Blight	1,657	31.8	+31.8
Labour	Peter Ward	692	13.3	+7.5
Majority		1,202	23.1	+11.0
Turnout		5,208	39.2	−1.2
Independent Ratepayers hold		Swing	+11.5	

Shirley West
Party	Candidate	Votes	%	±%
Independent	Brenda Otton	1,453	38.1	−16.9
Independent Ratepayers	John Rogers	1,059	27.8	+27.8
Liberal Democrats	Honor Cox	684	17.9	+17.9
Labour	Ann Littley	615	16.1	+8.6
Majority		394	10.3	−7.2
Turnout		3,811	41.2	+4.0
Independent hold		Swing	-22.3	

Silhill
Party	Candidate	Votes	%	±%
Conservative	Sheila Pittaway	2,414	51.4	−22.0
Liberal Democrats	Jill Puckering	1,376	29.3	+14.9
Labour	Donald Bargery	754	16.1	+3.9
National Front	Norman Tomkinson	150	3.2	+3.2
Majority		1,038	22.1	−36.9
Turnout		4,694	46.7	+6.7
Conservative hold		Swing	-18.4	

Smith's Wood
Party	Candidate	Votes	%	±%
Labour	Hugh Hendry	1,902	70.2	+9.5
Conservative	Timothy Vernon	481	17.8	−18.5
Liberal Democrats	Jonathan Merkens	325	12.0	+12.0
Majority		1,421	52.5	+27.9
Turnout		2,708	31.4	+9.7
Labour hold		Swing	+14.0	

St. Alphege
Party	Candidate	Votes	%	±%
Conservative	Kathleen Wild	3,316	65.6	−13.7
Liberal Democrats	Roger Gemmell	1,324	26.2	+26.2
Labour	A. Hanley	418	8.3	+2.3
Majority		1,992	39.4	−25.2
Turnout		5,058	47.6	+3.6
Conservative hold		Swing	-19.9	
