= James Bridge =

James Bridge may refer to:

- James Bridge Copper Works, British copper smelting plant
- James River Bridge, a bridge in Virginia, United States carrying U.S. Route 17, U.S. 258, and State Route 32
- James River Bridge (Interstate 95), a bridge in Virginia, United States carrying Interstate 95

== See also ==
- Darlaston James Bridge railway station (former), West Midlands
- James Bridges (disambiguation)
