= Shelly Green =

Coordinates: 52.3874°N 1.7871°W

- Interactive map of Shelly Green
- Country: United Kingdom
- Urban Area: West Midlands conurbation

Area
  - Total: 132 ha (330 acres)

Population (2001)
  - Total: 5,702
  - Density: 4,320/km^{2} (11,200/sq mi)
- Time zone: UTC+0 (UTC)
  - Summer (DST): UTC+1 (BST)

Shelly Green is a settlement in the West Midlands conurbation, although it was not considered as such until the late 1990s. As of 2001 it had a population of 5,702.
