= Saqib Bhatti =

British politician (born 1985)

Saqib Bhatti MBE MP
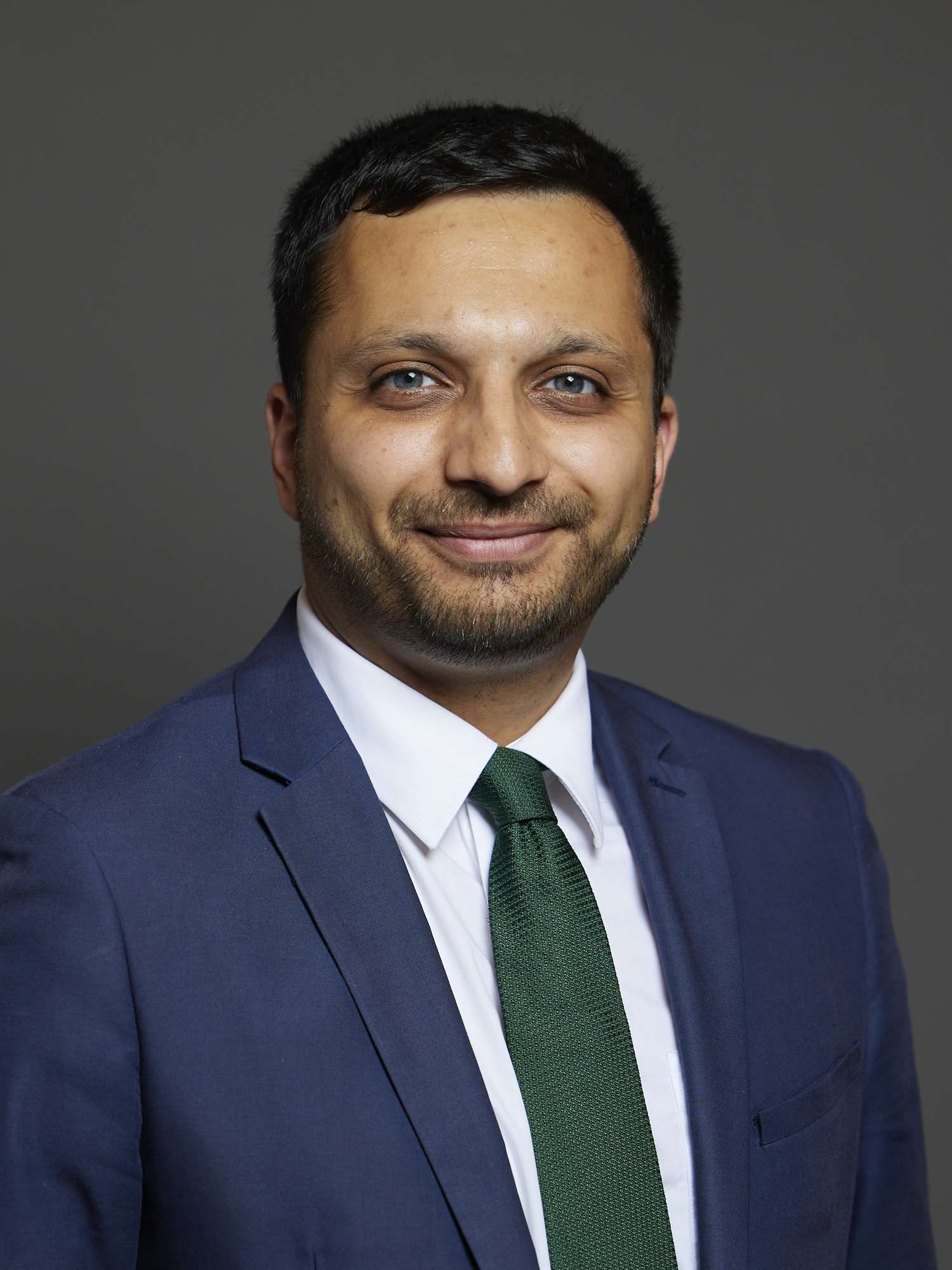
- Official portrait, 2024

Shadow Minister for Education
- Incumbent
- Assumed office 23 July 2025
- Leader: Kemi Badenoch
- Preceded by: Neil O'Brien

Shadow Minister for Culture, Media and Sport
- In office 4 November 2024 – 23 July 2025
- Leader: Kemi Badenoch
- Preceded by: Luke Evans
- Succeeded by: Louie French

Shadow Minister for Health and Social Care
- In office 19 July 2024 – 6 November 2024
- Leader: Rishi Sunak
- Preceded by: Preet Kaur Gill
- Succeeded by: Caroline Johnson; Luke Evans

Shadow Minister for Science, Innovation and Technology
- In office 19 July 2024 – 6 November 2024
- Leader: Rishi Sunak
- Preceded by: Chi Onwurah
- Succeeded by: Ben Spencer

Parliamentary Under-Secretary of State for Tech and the Digital Economy
- In office 13 November 2023 – 5 July 2024
- Prime Minister: Rishi Sunak
- Preceded by: Paul Scully
- Succeeded by: The Baroness Jones of Whitchurch

Vice Chairman of the Conservative Party for Business
- In office 30 September 2022 – 13 November 2023
- Leader: Liz Truss; Rishi Sunak

Member of Parliament for Meriden and Solihull East Meriden (2019–2024)
- Incumbent
- Assumed office 12 December 2019
- Preceded by: Caroline Spelman
- Majority: 4,584 (10.4%)

Personal details
- Born: Mohammad Saqib Bhatti; 18 June 1985 (age 41) Walsall, West Midlands, England
- Party: Conservative
- Spouse: Aminah Bhatti (m. 2020)
- Children: 3
- Education: London School of Economics (LLB)
- Website: www.saqibbhatti.org.uk

Mohammad Saqib Bhatti MBE (born 18 June 1985) is a British Conservative Party politician who has been the Member of Parliament (MP) for Meriden and Solihull East, formerly Meriden, since the 2019 general election. Saqib currently serves as Shadow Minister for Education. His previous positions in the Conservative Shadow Government are as Shadow Minister for Science, Innovation and Technology, Shadow Minister for Health and Social Care and Shadow Minister for Culture, Media and Sport. He previously served as Parliamentary Under-Secretary of State for Tech and the Digital Economy from 2023 to 2024 and as the Vice Chairman of the Conservative Party for Business from 2022 to 2023.

Prior to serving in parliament, Bhatti founded the pro-Brexit group Muslims for Britain, which advocated for leaving the European Union (EU) in the 2016 referendum.

== Early life and education ==
Bhatti was born and raised in Walsall, West Midlands, England in a Pakistani immigrant family from Punjab. His father, Younis Bhatti, is from Gujar Khan, while his mother is from Murree. Younis is UK secretary general of the Al-Shifa Eye Trust, a Pakistan-based eyecare hospital that provides treatment to individuals who cannot afford it.

Bhatti was privately educated at King Edwards VI School in Edgbaston, before studying law at the London School of Economics (LSE), from where he graduated with an LLB (Hons) degree. Whilst at university, he served as president of the LSE Pakistan Society.

== Early career ==
Bhatti is an accountant by profession. In 2018, he became the President of the Greater Birmingham Chambers of Commerce, becoming the youngest person and first Muslim to hold the post.

Bhatti founded the group Muslims for Britain which campaigned for the UK to leave the EU during the Brexit referendum. He argued that EU policy prevented immigration from South Asia and that leaving the EU would make it easier. As of 2018 he was a senior policy adviser with the Alliance of Conservatives and Reformists in Europe.

== Member of Parliament ==
After Caroline Spelman announced she was standing down as an MP, Bhatti was selected to represent the Conservative seat of Meriden at the 2019 general election, beating the political adviser Nick Timothy in the ballot of party members.

Saqib was appointed Private Parliamentary Secretary Liz Truss, the then Secretary of State to the Department for International Trade in 2020. He then moved to the Department for Health and Social Care where he served as Private Parliamentary Secretary to the Secretary of State, the Rt Hon. Sajid Javid MP, whom he followed in resigning on 5 July 2022 in the aftermath of the Chris Pincher scandal.

On 30 September 2022, Bhatti became the Conservative Party's Vice Chair for Business. Saqib was then appointed as Parliamentary Under-Secretary of State for Tech and the Digital Economy - a position he held until the 2024 general election.

In the 2024 UK general election, Bhatti's constituency of Meriden was renamed to Meriden and Solihull East after the reshaping of constituency boundaries. Saqib won 16,792 votes, seeing him retain his position as the elected Member of Parliament for his constituency.

Following the election, Bhatti was instated as Shadow Minister for Science, Innovation and Technology, in addition to Shadow Minister for Health and Social Care.

After the 2024 Conservative Leadership Election, newly elected Conservative Party Leader Kemi Badenoch reshuffled her Shadow Government, resulting in Bhatti's move to Shadow Minister for Culture, Media and Sport. The most recent shadow government reshuffle saw Saqib assume the role of Shadow Minister for Education, which he has held since 23 July 2025.

=== Leadership election positions ===
In the July–September 2022 Conservative leadership election, Bhatti endorsed Liz Truss, stating that Truss "understands that for businesses to thrive, the government needs to get out of the way."

== Honours ==
Bhatti was appointed a Member of the Order of the British Empire (MBE) in the 2020 New Year Honours "for services to diversity and inclusion in the business community", while he was President of the Greater Birmingham Chamber of Commerce.

Bhatti also holds an honorary doctorate from Aston University in Business Administration.

== Electoral history ==
General election 2024: Meriden and Solihull East
Party	Candidate	Votes	%	±%
Conservative	Saqib Bhatti	16,792	38.1	−24.3
Labour	Sarah Alan	12,208	27.7	+6.9
Reform	Malcolm Sedgley	8,753	19.9	N/A
Liberal Democrats	Sunny Virk	3,353	7.6	−6.0
Green	Shesh Sheshabhatter	2,929	6.7	+3.5
Majority		4,584	10.4	−31.2
Turnout		44,035	59.8	−4.8
Conservative hold		Swing	-15.6	

General election 2019: Meriden
Party	Candidate	Votes	%	±%
Conservative	Saqib Bhatti	34,358	63.4	+1.4
Labour	Teresa Beddis	11,522	21.3	−5.6
Liberal Democrats	Laura McCarthy	5,614	10.4	+5.5
Green	Stephen Caudwell	2,667	4.9	+2.3
Majority		22,836	42.1	+7.0
Turnout		54,161	64.9	−2.7
Conservative hold		Swing	+3.5	

Parliament of the United Kingdom
Preceded by Caroline Spelman	Member of Parliament for Meriden; 2019–2024	Constituency abolished
New constituency	Member of Parliament for Meriden and Solihull East; 2024–present	Incumbent
