= Black Country Local Enterprise Partnership =

Local enterprise partnership in the United Kingdom

The Black Country Local Enterprise Partnership was a local enterprise partnership (LEP) established in 2012, which sought to help with economic growth and plans around the Black Country, in West Midlands County, England. The partnership officially closed services at the end of 2023 with operations moving over to the West Midlands Combined Authority.

== Members ==
The LEP covered the towns of Aldridge, Bilston, Brownhills, Darlaston, Dudley, Halesowen, Oldbury, Smethwick, Stourbridge, Tipton, Walsall, Wednesbury, West Bromwich, Willenhall, and the city of Wolverhampton. The partnership was shared among Dudley Metropolitan Borough, Sandwell Metropolitan Borough, Walsall Metropolitan Borough and the city of Wolverhampton, which were also part of the West Midlands Conurbation.

== History ==
In 2010, the Black Country Consortium submitted a rationale for a local enterprise partnership:

The Black Country has well established, mature relationships between business, education and the four local authorities which have transcended changes in political leadership and enabled the Black Country to work collaboratively for a decade. With a strong evidence base, and a Joint Spatial Strategy we are extremely confident of our ability to deliver economic growth to communities in the Black Country. It is from these foundations that the Black Country will build a Local Enterprise Partnership.

— Black County Consortim submission to Government

According to the Express and Star, "Since 2012 the Black Country Consortium hosted the Black Country Local Enterprise Partnership, and using the LEP as a conduit the consortium invested £430 million of LEP-awarded funding to help develop the Black Country economy."

Mayor Andy Street explained, "The Black Country LEP in particular was crucial in helping to begin to transform the Black Country thanks to their part in securing the Dudley Institute of Technology, the revamp of Junction 10 of the M6, and the growth of i9 in Wolverhampton - as well as supporting countless other projects and businesses across the region."

M2 Presswire reported the closure of LEPs: "The moves comes after the Government's announcement in last year's Levelling-Up White Paper that all 38 LEPs in England were to integrate into their local democratic institutions." According to Mayor Street, "Helping businesses to develop is critical to the success of the West Midlands - both in creating jobs and driving economic growth. The Black Country alone has phenomenal businesses employing over 460,000 people and contributing billions of pounds to the region's economy... We therefore cannot allow the hard work and success of the Black Country and other LEPs across the region to be lost..."

== See also ==
- Greater Birmingham and Solihull Local Enterprise Partnership
