= Dorridge =

Village in the West Midlands, England

Coordinates: 52.37196°N 1.75541157°W

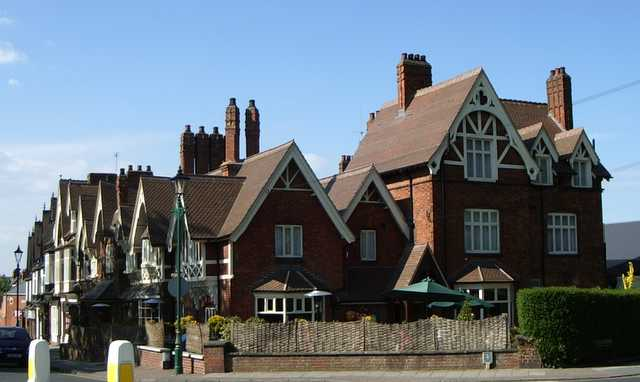
- The Forest Hotel, Dorridge

- Location within the West Midlands
- Population: 11,140 (2011 Census)
- OS grid reference: SP166749
  - London: 91 mi (146 km)
- Metropolitan borough: Solihull
- Metropolitan county: West Midlands
- Region: West Midlands
- Country: England
- Sovereign state: United Kingdom
- Post town: Solihull
- Postcode district: B93
- Police: West Midlands
- Fire: West Midlands
- Ambulance: West Midlands
- UK Parliament: Meriden and Solihull East

Dorridge is a large village in the Metropolitan Borough of Solihull in the West Midlands (county), England. Historically part of the historic county of Warwickshire, the village is encompassed within the electoral ward of Dorridge and Hockley Heath, which had a population of 11,140 in the 2011 census.

== Location ==
Dorridge is to the north of the M40 and the east of the M42, which, with a small but important green belt area, separates Dorridge and its neighbours Knowle and Bentley Heath from the greater urban area of Birmingham, with the town Solihull encompassing the green-belt area. It is situated at the southwestern extreme of the Meriden Gap and until 1974 was part of Warwickshire. Indeed, there are no major towns between Dorridge and Warwick. It is 125 metres (400 ft) above sea level, located in the Midlands Plateau. Both Knowle and the sub-village Bentley Heath are contiguous with Dorridge to the north and share its B93 postcode.

== History ==
=== Earliest existence ===
The village of Dorridge did not exist as a community until the mid-19th century, though it is mentioned as far back as 1400 in the Westminster Muniments which recorded a place called 'Derrech' - a clearing in the wood frequented by animals. It was just the name given to the ridge of land running westwards from Knowle (also then called 'Dorege'). The earliest evidence of settlement dates to the Bronze Age – an axe dated to 1300 BC was found in Norton Green. Cottages dating back to the 16th century exist in Mill Pool Lane. However, the lack of any significant road system until the arrival of the railway showed that there was no community there.

With the rise of Solihull, a road connecting to Hockley Heath became formed. Along this road, the Four Ashes (after which the recently developed estate was named) became a landmark – records show the trees being present in 1662 and marking the Parish boundary. They were also mapped in 1725 even in preference to some local buildings of note. The ashes still exist today near to the driving range, though they have been replaced several times since the earliest records. The Drum and Monkey existed from around 1860, though then it was known as The White Lion Inn.

=== Impact of the railway ===
In 1852 the railway was built by the Great Western Railway, originally in Brunel's preferred 7-foot gauge track. Dorridge railway station, which was originally called Knowle, and later Knowle and Dorridge, created the focal point for a new community. The Muntz family granted the land for the railway on condition that a station was built – perhaps less surprising on discovering that the Chairman of the Birmingham & Oxford Railway Company was P. H. Muntz, a relative. There is some folklore about the agreement that suggests that the railway was obliged to stop at Dorridge; however, with the affluent residents of Knowle and Dorridge, it was certainly a commercial practicality. Evidence of the popularity of the railway can be seen in that a "bus" service from the Greswolde Hotel in Knowle was provided in the early days of the railway at the cost of 6d. In its heyday, the train service ran between Lapworth and Birmingham with four tracks, but by the mid-1960s two tracks had been removed and traffic was declining. The link with London was revived in the 1990s as part of the privatisation of British Rail, initially with a single track running south of Banbury. Dual track working was reinstated and today in spite of being a village, Dorridge is still one of the stops on the express service.

=== Muntz family influence ===
The development of Dorridge is strongly linked to the Muntz family, who lived in nearby Umberslade Hall. The Muntz family were descendants of Philip Fredrick Muntz, an immigrant of the 18th century, who had left revolutionary France after settling there from Poland. Through industrial wealth, founded on a brass-making process for creating Muntz metal, a form of brass used in shipbuilding, the family acquired a considerable estate in the area.

Possibly the most famous of the Muntz family was the inventor of Muntz metal, George Frederic Muntz, who was also an early Member of Parliament for Birmingham. He was a supporter of political reform and a founding member of the Birmingham Political Union along with Thomas Attwood. In his actions that led to the Reform Act 1832 Muntz was indicted for sedition as he tried to undermine the Duke of Wellington with a run on gold – To stop the Duke, run for Gold. He also was involved in a riot at St Martin's in Birmingham in protest against the Church Rates which were levied at around 6d to 9d in the pound. He was sent to trial in 1838 but was acquitted on all but one of 13 charges. Whilst claiming to be a Republican, his true character appeared to be that of an egotistical aristocrat. E. Edwards wrote in 1877 in the Birmingham Daily Mail of a conversation about a speech he made: "They won't be able to print Muntz's speech verbatim." "Why not?" said I. "Why my dear fellow, no printing office in the world would have capital I's enough."

=== Middlefield Hospital ===
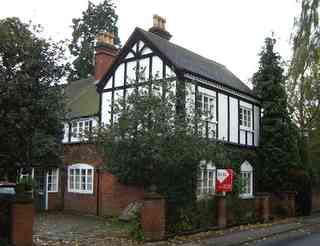
Dorridge Grove, former public house and asylum.

Dr Fletcher of Dorridge, together with Jonathan Henry Kimball of Knowle also provided for an 'Asylum for 20 Idiot Girls' in the mid-19th century, in 'Dorridge Grove' which was on the site of the former 'Royal Oak'; the building still exists as a distinctive house on Knowle Wood Road. The term 'idiot' was a specific term for those considered ineducable and was considered different from insanity. The records of the early years show that it was a successful enterprise, surprising those who visited that they achieved so much improvement in the behaviour of the patients.

The demand for this facility was such that a purpose-built Idiot Asylum was then constructed in 1872 near Grove Road for £10,000. The construction of this was something of a national event: representatives of 100 Masonic Lodges marched from Knowle Station to take part in the laying of the foundation stone, which was set in place using the same mallet used by King Charles the Second to lay the foundation stone of Saint Paul's Cathedral in London. The asylum was funded mainly by the local Counties of the Midlands, but George Fredrick Muntz sponsored competition with a prize of £100 for the best design. It provided for housing idiot children from all over the Midlands. It is perhaps telling that in 1867 it was renamed to be the 'Midland Counties Middleclass Idiots Asylum' and although subsidised, families typically had to pay an annual fee to have their children placed there. This was extended in 1893 and evolved into the Middlefield Hospital which existed on the same site until the 1990s, having been adopted by the National Health Service in 1948.

=== Development of housing ===
Dorridge was not considered a district in its own right until 1940. Around the start of the 19th century, much of what is now Knowle Wood Road, (was then Packwood Road) was farmland with just a few dwellings, similarly Avenue Road (which was then Warwick Road) had a handful of dwellings. By the 1930s the main Dorridge Triangle was properly established. Aside from the substantial family homes, there are a significant number of mansions, some of which, such as Parkfield near the park, have now been converted into flats.

During the 1930s, development slowed, and it was not until the 1950s that expansion gathered pace again. One of the earliest post-War developments was Kingscote Road, one of the few developments of semi-detached housing in the area, followed by the nearby Rodborough Road development in 1960.

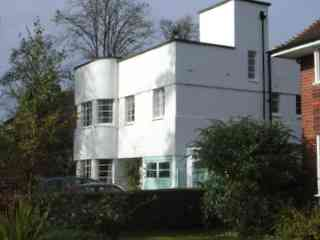
Art Deco house on Avenue Road.

There was a substantial development in the 1960s around the area christened by estate agents as the "Golden Triangle" – alluding to the expensive and desirable housing of the area bounded by Dorridge Road, Avenue Road and Knowle Wood Road. Even then the local press noted the high cost of housing, and that 2 and 3 car households were well above the national average. This area of housing has been noted as the most expensive in all of Dorridge and Knowle. This neighbourhood's proximity to the railway station has pushed property prices up much more than other areas of Dorridge. The population expanded rapidly: there were around 600 dwellings in 1955, which expanded to 1800 by the mid-1970s to somewhere above 2500 homes by the year 2000.

Whilst there is a history of locals taking a dim view of developers, a local developer, Mr Ford, gave the land which is now Dorridge Park to the community in 1965.

In the late 1990s another substantial development was built on former farmland in the area known as Four Ashes, behind the Porsche Centre Solihull, and the development of the Middlefield Hospital site occurred at a similar time.

The architecture is a reflection of this development — there are some fine buildings from the Victorian era all around the area. Over the years, each period has then added buildings of its style — Avenue Road, for example, has classic Art Deco houses with rounded metal-framed windows. Building sizes were restricted in the post-war era. Buildings in the 1960s, though of limited architectural merit, were built with large gardens; many owners have since imposed character on these houses. More modern developments have seen the move to build apartment-style blocks, though there have also been substantial houses built, often on the site of much smaller houses and at the expense of the large gardens that still characterise the area.

=== Schools ===
The Infant and Junior schools today have over 750 pupils, until as recently as 1955 there were no schools in Dorridge, with pupils travelling to Bentley Heath, Hockley Heath, Knowle or Packwood to get an education. In 1955 Dorridge Junior School was built and by 1963 an Infant School was built. These were joined by the Catholic School of St. George and Teresa. The secondary education is mainly provided by Arden School in nearby Knowle, which now also has a sixth form centre. The sixth form buildings were completed in 2007 with additions being made every year. A considerable number of children go to private schools in Solihull, Warwick or Birmingham or to grammar schools in Birmingham, Stratford and Alcester.

=== Commercial development ===
When coming to Dorridge today, a visitor would be surprised to know that there was significant activity in the area over the last hundred years.

In Poplar Road, between the Station and the level crossing at Bentley Heath, a significant goods yard existed. During the 1960s and 1970s the Austin Motor Company used it to deliver up to 600 cars a day for export, via the railway. It has now been replaced with sheltered housing.

A brickworks, the Knowle Brick Company, existed off Mill Lane with its own clay pit. The company ceased production in 1969, and whole the site was converted to housing in 1993 by Bloor Homes. The extent of the brickworks and pit site is the same as that now occupied by all the housing accessed via Oakhall Drive.

A gasworks was developed on land that has now been developed into flats. Many of the buildings around the area that is now a Conservation Area – Station Approach – date back to around the start of the 20th century or before, though aside from the Forest Court shopping centre and the HSBC bank, now a café, the centre is essentially unchanged from the mid-1950s.

In 2008, Sainsbury's revealed that they had purchased a long lease to redevelop the Forest Court shopping centre and also owned part of the Station Approach Conservation Area which they intend to refurbish. An independent local group was formed in 2010 as a focus of opposition to any redevelopment of Forest Court which, it is argued, would be inappropriate in scale for the existing village centre. After some changes to the plans approval was given by Solihull Metropolitan Borough Council, and in the summer of 2013 Sainsbury's submitted an application to amend some details of the scheme.

== Dorridge today ==
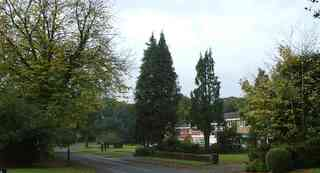
Clyde Road.

The railway station is on the line between London and Birmingham. Chiltern Railways have created an inter-city route out of the run-down remnants of what had become primarily a goods line. A West Midlands Railway route now terminates in Dorridge or Leamington Spa, from Birmingham.

Dorridge is neither urban nor a village. However, it sits right next to the Warwickshire countryside, with green fields being a short walk from the town centre.

It has a small shopping precinct, a village hall, three churches and a number of schools. The substantial Dorridge Park borders the countryside to the South.

There are three pubs in Dorridge - The Drum & Monkey, the Railway Inn, and The Forest Hotel. There is also a bar and social club at Knowle and Dorridge Cricket Club.

The property prices around Dorridge are the highest in the West Midlands region and also the highest in the entire English Midlands. In 2005, several houses sold for over £1,000,000 according to the land registry. According to housing website Zoopla, the average house price in Dorridge in the year to October 2024 was almost £678,000, amongst the very highest in the UK outside of London.

There are a number of notable residents who live here or very nearby, Jasper Carrott, The Office actress Lucy Davis, Sir Adrian Cadbury, Karren Brady former managing director of Birmingham City F.C, Steve Bruce, former manager of Birmingham City F.C, former England International Lee Hendrie, alongside many other professional footballers and Musicians Bev Bevan, Harry Sutcliffe and Russell Leetch.

Dorridge is part of the Meriden constituency. Which will be renamed as Meriden and Solihull East for the 2024 general election.

== Community groups ==
Aside from the strong church communities, the town benefits from a Round Table, a Residents' Association, a Neighbourhood Forum, drama groups and youth organisations including the strong Dorridge Scout Group. Some of the organisations are shared with Knowle, such as Knowle Sea Scout Group for young people aged 6 to 18.

=== Residents' Association ===
The Residents' Association was formed in 1961. It was formed in response to concerns over unwelcome developments and also helped develop facilities for local residents. In 1974, Dorridge Day was first held as a fundraising event for the Village Hall which was opened in 1976. The Dorridge & District Residents Association first ran the event, though in recent years, Knowle and Dorridge Round Table have run this popular annual fair.

=== Neighbourhood Forum ===
Knowle, Dorridge and Bentley Heath Neighbourhood Forum was formed in 2015 with the purpose of bringing together the people from the three adjoining villages to define how they would like to see the villages develop in the future. The Forum will collate the policies developed into a draft Neighbourhood Plan for the three villages during 2017, and subsequently arrange for a local referendum to create the Neighbourhood Plan as a statutory planning document for the area. The Forum is run entirely by volunteers, and by Spring 2017 had a membership of over 800.

=== Churches ===
St Phillip's Church was first built in 1878 serving the Anglican community. It was demolished and rebuilt in 2020.

Originally, the Catholic population had no formal meeting place but met in Cross Close, a house in Arden Drive. In 1917 St George & St Teresa's church was built on Station Road. This burnt down in 1935 and was replaced with the substantial building on the same site, which still exists today. In 2006, a parish centre was added to the church, which was paid off in 2015.

The Methodists put down their roots in 1958 with the arrival of their church in Mill Lane.

Knowle and Dorridge Christadelphians meet in Dorridge Village Hall on Sundays.

=== Round table ===
Knowle and Dorridge Round Table 812 was founded in 1963. For many years its regular meeting place was in Knowle, but the membership has always been drawn from the two communities. Whilst primarily a friendship organisation, it supports local charities, with the two main events it runs being Dorridge Day and the Christmas sleigh, visiting nearly every street in the area every December.

=== Dorridge Scout Group ===
Dorridge Scout Group was formed from the old 1st and 2nd Dorridge Scouts. In 1974 Ken Billings assisted by Tim became Scout Masters. The Scouts had a meeting house in Dorridge Park, but only two scouts in the first year. The next two years saw the group grow to over 50 members.

In the 00s, Dorridge Scout Group expanded with the addition of "Darwin", an Explorer Scout group, providing activities for young people of mixed genders between the ages of 14–18. As of 2026, the group is part of the Cole Valley South Scout District, one of six districts making up Birmingham Scout County. Dorridge Scout Group consists of three Beaver groups, three Cub groups, three Scout groups, and an Explorer group.

== Places of interest ==
Nearby there are the historic buildings of Packwood House and Baddesley Clinton now in the care of the National Trust, and the Grand Union Canal is in walking distance with both the Heron's Nest and Black Boy pubs being accessible. The Stratford-upon-Avon Canal also links in and is notable for a large flight of locks that descend into nearby Lapworth from Birmingham.

To the West, just across the M42, there is a nature reserve at Blythe Valley Business Park. The park is next to the River Blythe which is a Site of Special Scientific Interest. Footpaths run from Dorridge both to the Park and to Solihull's Brueton Park, the latter at times running alongside the River Blythe.

== Sport ==
As well as being home to Ye Olde Knowle Bowling Club, Dorridge Cricket Club play at The John Woolman Ground in Grange Road while Birmingham and District Premier League side Knowle and Dorridge Cricket Club sits on the village's border with Knowle.

== Noted Person ==
John Wyndham - (John Wyndham Parkes Lucas Beynon Harris) - born in Dorridge - (10 July 1903 – 11 March 1969)
