= James Bridge Copper Works =

Copper refining plant in Walsall, Staffordshire, England

Coordinates: 52°34′39″N 2°00′39″W

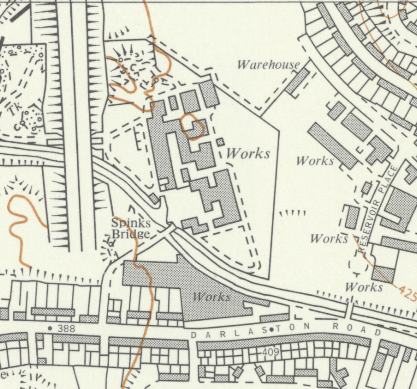
The works on a 1968 Ordnance Survey map. The part-built M6 Motorway can be seen immediately to the west.

The James Bridge Copper Works was a copper refining plant in Walsall, Staffordshire, England. It was established as a smelting plant in 1917 on a site formerly used for ironstone and coal mining and as a brickworks. From 1920 it was owned by the Wolverhampton Metal Company who expanded the works. It was temporarily closed in 1931–2 because of local pollution issues and during the Second World War due to blackout regulations. After the war the plant specialised in reclamation of copper from waste materials and helped to alleviate a national shortage of copper; by 1964 the plant had electrowinning facilities. The works was purchased by Imperial Metal Industries Limited in 1967 and the electrowinning facilities were greatly expanded over the following decades. The site closed in 1999.

The site had been heavily contaminated by its industrial use and by 2019 had come into the ownership of Walsall Council and Homes England. The site, known as Phoenix 10, was proposed for redevelopment into commercial units and permission for this was granted in April 2021. Henry Boot plc commenced remediation works in May 2021.

== Copper works ==
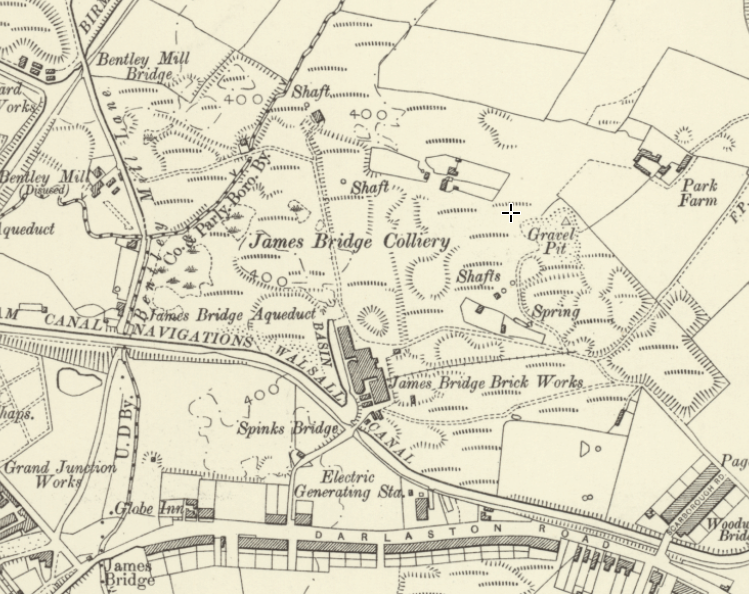
The colliery and brickworks shown on a 1904 Ordnance Survey map

The site, located in western Walsall, Staffordshire, was formerly a colliery and ironstone mine. It operated under a number of owners between 1855 and 1910. A basin on the Walsall Canal adjacent to the ironstone works allowed for the export of ore. A brickworks operated on the site until 1897 and gravel and sand extraction was also carried out in the area.

A copper works was established on the site in 1917 with the canal basin used to supply coal to the works. The copper works helped to meet the increased demand caused by the First World War. The works was purchased by the Wolverhampton Metal Company in 1920. In 1931 the works, which by then employed 150 workers, closed following complaints from Walsall County Borough Council. The council complained about the odour caused by the smelting of copper ore with a high sulphur content and about soot from the works' 100-foot (30 m) chimney falling onto the town. Taller chimneys were erected at the site and the works resumed production in 1932.

Aerial photographs of the James Bridge Copper Works
- By Aerofilms Ltd
- From the southwest (April 1928)
- From the south (July 1948)

The works closed during the Second World War due to the impact of blackout regulations. It reopened after the war to salvage copper from war surplus material and James Bridge Copper Works was floated as a public company in 1946. In the post-war years the works pioneered new smelting processes and became leaders in the reclamation of copper from waste material. The James Bridge site was able to recover copper from lower-grade material than any other plant in the country. Raw material, including ash residue from other foundries and old car parts, was brought to the site by road and rail to produce copper of up to 80% purity. This helped to ease a national shortage of copper and reduced the need for imports from abroad. The James Bridge works also recovered other metals from the raw material; steel was sold direct while aluminium was sent to the Wolverhampton Metal Company for further processing. By 1964 the works had electrowinning facilities in addition to the smelters and manufactured anodes, cathodes and rough filter cake. Nickel(II) sulphate was produced as a by-product from the electrowinning process.

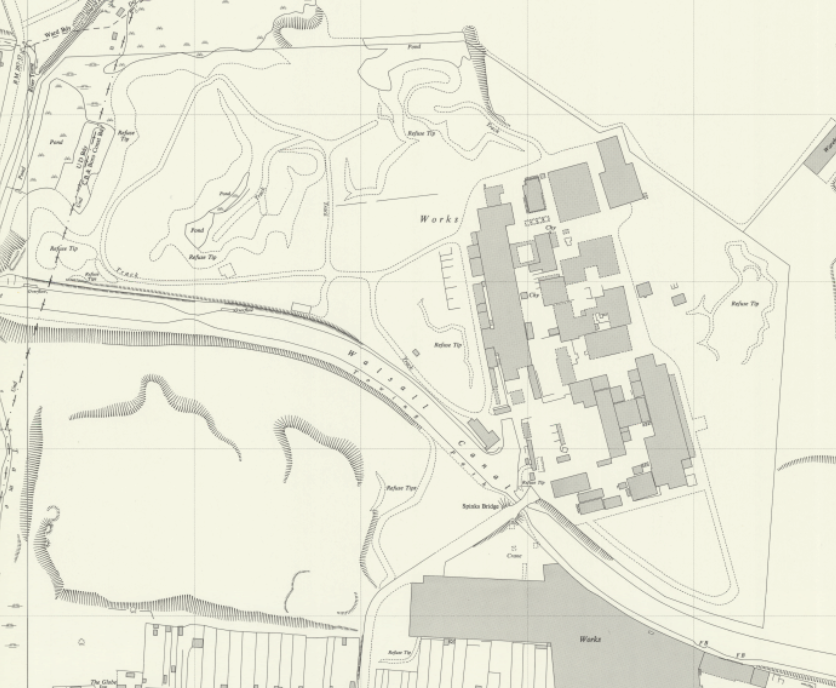
A 1962 map showing the works

In 1967 the James Bridge Copper Works was modernised as part of a £3 million (equivalent to £61,777,778 in 2024) redevelopment that aimed to increase outputs of the highest grade electrolytic copper to 50,000 long tons (51,000 t) per year. Imperial Metal Industries Limited (IMI) purchased the Wolverhampton Metal Company in 1967, having been attracted by the James Bridge site. A new electrowinning refining tank was opened in 1968, designed to produce 27,500 long tons (27,900 t) of copper per year. This was constructed adjacent to the existing facilities, which allowed for the works to carry out low- and high-purity refining simultaneously for the first time. By 1971 the new refining tank alone was producing 34,000 long tons (35,000 t) per year. The new refining tank was upgraded in 1972 and by the following year was producing 56,000 long tons (57,000 t) per year.

The James Bridge Copper Works became IMI Refiners Limited on 1 October 1971. The parent company continued to invest heavily in the works and in 1984 introduced a largescale continuous copper anode casting line, one of only three in the world. This development cost £3.4 million (equivalent to £11,422,356 in 2024) and was part-funded by a £400,000 (equivalent to £1,343,807 in 2024) industrial development grant from the British government. Around the same time a £758,586 (equivalent to £2,548,482 in 2024) three-year project was carried out to install a continuous copper strip casting line, part-funded by a £252,862 (equivalent to £849,494 in 2024) government grant. Slag from the works was sold for use in grit blasting. The James Bridge Copper Works closed in 1999. IMI Refiners Limited continues to exist as a non-trading company, based out of the Birmingham Business Park in Solihull; its sole activity is to receive interest on a loan made to another IMI company.

== Redevelopment ==
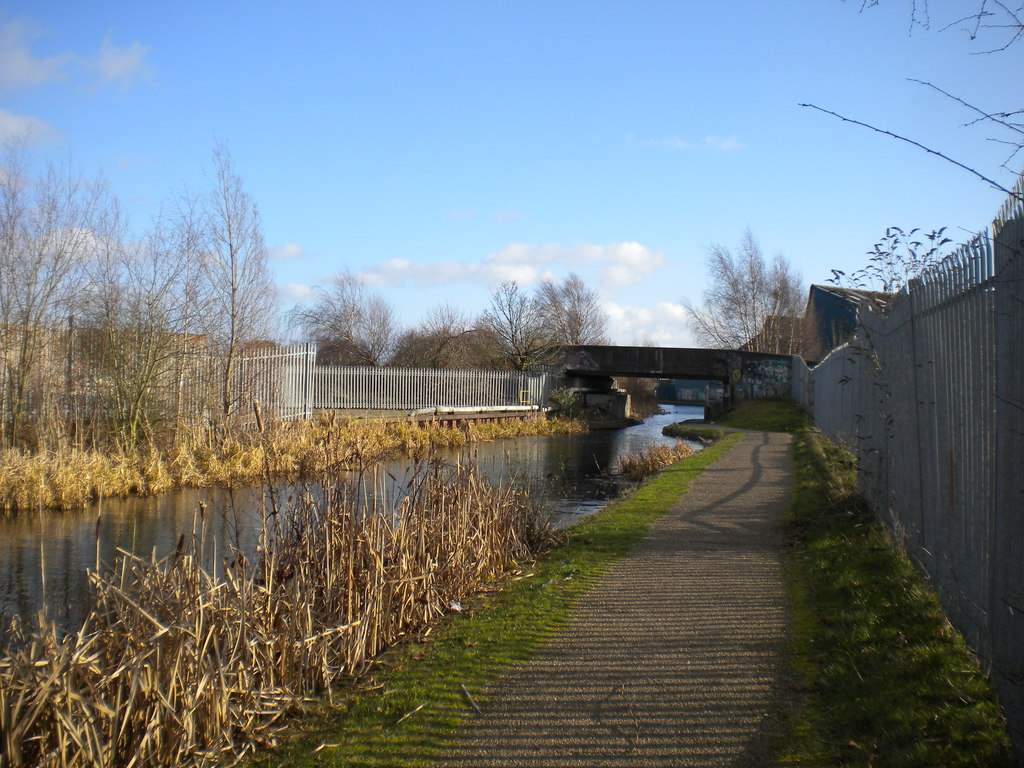
A 2020 photograph of the Spinks Bridge over the Walsall Canal. This bridge connected the main works (left) to the Darlaston Road. The sheet piles on the left bank block off the former canal basin.

The James Bridge site sat unused following the closure of the copper works and was described by the West Midlands Combined Authority (WMCA) as "one of the biggest derelict sites in the Black Country". By 2019 the 44 acres (18 ha) plot was jointly owned by Walsall Council and Homes England and was known as the Phoenix 10 site. The site has been heavily contaminated by its industrial use and Walsall Council leader Mike Bird described it in 2021 as the "most contaminated site in Europe". The site posed no risks to surrounding land but concerns were raised by local residents over the potential for release of contaminants into the atmosphere and water supplies if the site was to be developed. Walsall Council had been trying to carry out remediation to the contaminated site since circa 2011. In 2015 the Homes and Communities Agency advertised a contract to repair and replace the boundary fence, to bury slag (which was noted to have very low levels of ionising radiation) and to remove asbestos-containing materials from the site. The contract documentation noted that trespassers were accessing the site to remove slag and recover the metal.

A redevelopment of the site into 620,000 square feet (58,000 m^{2}) of commercial units was proposed in 2019; to be part-funded by WMCA and carried out by Henry Boot plc. The WMCA described the site, which has the potential to create 1,100 permanent jobs, as the "largest potential employment site in the Black Country and one of the largest brownfield employment opportunities in the West Midlands". Contracts between Walsall Council and Henry Boot were signed in 2021, with the works expected to cost around £100 million; at this time additional funding had been made available by the Black Country Local Enterprise Partnership. Henry Boot submitted a planning application for the works in January 2021. Some local residents objected to the application because of the loss of vegetation and possible traffic, parking and dust during construction; the Birmingham and Black Country Wildlife Trust also objected on the grounds of habitat loss. Council planning officers recommended that the application be granted and councillors approved it on 30 April 2021.

Remediation works began on site by May 2021 and were completed in 2024. This included the grouting and capping of 134 former mine shafts, the processing of 735,200 cubic metres (25,960,000 cu ft) of refuse tip material, of which 91% was kept on site, and the treatment of 5,700,000 litres (1,300,000 imp gal; 1,500,000 US gal) of groundwater. Construction of a manufacturing and logistics hub, to be named SPARK, began in early 2025.
