= Bentley Heath =

Village in the West Midlands, England

Coordinates: 52.3837°N 1.7571°W

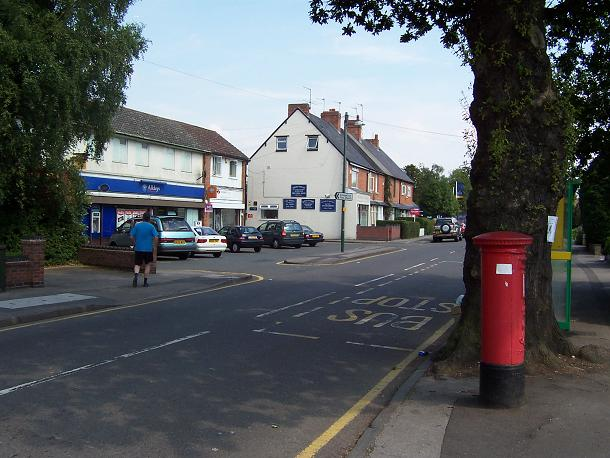
Bentley Heath

Bentley Heath is a village in the West Midlands Borough of Solihull, England, approximately 3 miles southeast of Solihull town centre.The name Bentley derives from the Old English words beonet (bent-grass) and lēah (a woodland clearing or glade), meaning "clearing where bent-grass grows", while Heath refers to the open, uncultivated heathland that lay between the historic manors of Widney and Longdon.

== Location ==
Bentley Heath is to the north of the M40 and east of the M42 which, along with a small but important green belt area, separates the village and its larger neighbours of Dorridge and Knowle from the Birmingham conurbation. It falls in the Meriden Gap and historically was part of Warwickshire. It is 125 metres (400 ft) above sea-level, located on the Midlands Plateau. The village shares the B93 postcode with its larger contiguous neighbours Dorridge and Knowle.

== Features ==
Bentley Heath contains a relatively large amount of green space, with the park, Bentley Heath School fields and various small greens dotted around the residential roads. In the village itself is the Bentley Heath Church of England Primary School, a village hall, a butcher's, a local Co-operative store, a carpet shop, a post office and a newsagent. There is a beauty salon, a hair salon, a café and an Indian restaurant, plus a florist's in the village centre and an Edward VII pillar box situated under a large oak tree next to the bus stop. The only public House in Bentley Heath is The Drum & Monkey which is owned by the Chef & Brewer chain.

== Economy and local businesses ==
While Bentley Heath is primarily a residential village with many residents commuting to nearby Solihull, Birmingham, and the wider West Midlands, it maintains a small local retail centre along Widney Road and Slater Road.

The local shopping parade provides everyday convenience services—including a post office, convenience store, newsagent, butcher, florist, veterinary practice, cafés, and independent salons—which are protected against loss of retail use under the Knowle, Dorridge and Bentley Heath Neighbourhood Plan. Every Friday morning, the Bentley Heath Country Market also operates at Bentley Heath Community Hall, selling locally produced baked goods, seasonal produce, plants, and handmade crafts.

== History ==
=== Earliest existence ===
It is likely that the Heath was first inhabited in Anglo-Saxon times. The Domesday Book records the land as belonging to Turchil of Warwick. After changing hands a number of times, the most famous Lord of the Manor was Lord Byron after whose wife Lady Byron Lane in Knowle is named. Widney Manor is referred to back in the reign of Henry III. Bentley Heath was first mentioned in its own right in 1280 where reference was made to the "Heath at Benteley".

Widney Manor came into the ownership of the Holbech family in the reign of Elizabeth I. No one landlord owned the land of Bentley Heath as the estate was split up in 1738; in the mid-19th century the main landowners were Thomas Haydon, Lady Noel Byron and Ann Musgrove.

Around 1850, the Great Western Railway was built, splitting the estate in two. The Muntz family bought some of the land in the latter part of the 19th century.

=== World War I ===
Several local men from Bentley Heath served in the British Armed Forces during the First World War, including:

- Corporal William Reginald Finley – born in Bentley Heath; served with the 1st Life Guards.
- Sapper Eustace Bertram Wagstaff – born in Bentley Heath; served with the Royal Engineers.
- Private Ernest William Clifford – Bentley Heath resident; served with the 1st Battalion, Coldstream Guards (died 4 March 1917).
- Private Walter James Painting – Bentley Heath resident; served with the 1st Battalion, Worcestershire Regiment (died 4 March 1917).
- Corporal William Robert Smith – moved to Bentley Heath as a child in 1891 and grew up in the village; served with the 4th Battalion, Coldstream Guards (died 26 January 1917).
- Lance Corporal Charles Thomas Hutchings – raised in Bentley Heath; served with the 9th Battalion, Worcestershire Regiment (died 16 August 1915).
- Frederick Clifford Baulcombe – moved to Bentley Heath as a child, attended Bentley Heath School, and served during the First World War (died 22 November 1916).
- Private James Stephen Wrench – lived at Grendon Cottages in Bentley Heath; served with the 9th Battalion, Royal Warwickshire Regiment (died 6 July 1916).

=== 20th Century ===
The former school building in Bentley Heath

During the 20th century, Bentley Heath transitioned from a rural hamlet into a residential suburb of Solihull. Its historic windmill, Bentley Heath Mill, stood in the village until its demolition in 1960, with its original millstone preserved on Milton Road.

British fairground historian, writer, and archivist Chris Russell was born on Francis Way in Bentley Heath on 13 May 1953; his research papers and archival collection are preserved by the National Fairground and Circus Archive at the University of Sheffield.

== Bentley Heath Church of England Primary School ==
Bentley Heath C of E Primary School, on Widney Road, is the only primary school in the village.

== Neighbourhood Forum ==
Knowle, Dorridge and Bentley Heath Neighbourhood Forum was formed in 2015 with the purpose of bringing together the people from the three adjoining villages to define how they would like to see the villages develop in the future. The Forum collated the policies into a draft Neighbourhood Plan, which was formally adopted in 2019 following a local referendum. The Forum is run entirely by volunteers, and by Spring 2017 had a membership of over 800.

== Landmarks ==
Several historic sites are located in and immediately bordering the village:

- The Chase (Smith's Lane) – a 17th-to-19th-century farmhouse and barns built on the remnants of a medieval moated site, included on Solihull Council's Local List of Heritage Assets.
- Tilehouse Green moated site – a water-filled medieval rectangular moat and scheduled monument located on the eastern edge of Bentley Heath bordering Knowle, historically part of a group of six moated sites within the Manor of Longdon.
- Bentley Heath Mill – a historic windmill that stood in the village until its demolition in 1960; its original millstone is preserved on Milton Road.
- Bullivents Coppice – a surviving pocket of ancient woodland linked to the historic Forest of Arden.

== Sport and recreation ==
Playing fields at Bentley Heath Recreation Ground

Bentley Heath has an active community hub centred on the Bentley Heath Community Centre on Widney Road, which hosts local clubs, fitness classes, and community events.

Bentley Heath Community Centre on Widney Road

Local sports facilities include Bentley Heath Recreation Ground on Widney Road, which provides public open space, a children's play area, and sports pitches, as well as the nearby Knowle & Dorridge Cricket Club on Station Road.

== Transport ==
Bentley Heath Level Crossing on the Chiltern Main Line

Bentley Heath sits immediately west of the B4101 (Widney Manor Road / Station Road), which links the village north-west towards Solihull town centre and south-east towards Knowle and Redditch. Junction 4 of the M42 motorway lies approximately 2 miles (3.2 km) to the south-west via the A34 (Stratford Road) at Monkspath.

The nearest railway stations are Widney Manor railway station to the north and Dorridge railway station to the south-east, both on the Chiltern Main Line and Leamington–Stratford line with regular services to Birmingham Snow Hill, Solihull, Leamington Spa, and London Marylebone. Local bus services connect Bentley Heath with Solihull, Knowle, Dorridge, and Balsall Common.
