= Greater Birmingham and Solihull Local Enterprise Partnership =

The Greater Birmingham & Solihull Local Enterprise Partnership (GBSLEP) was one the Local Enterprise Partnerships set up by UK Government to drive economic development in England.

== History ==
Established in May 2011, the LEP covers the geographical boundaries of the local authorities of Birmingham, Bromsgrove, Cannock Chase, East Staffordshire, Lichfield, Redditch, Solihull, Tamworth and Wyre Forest.

Its board is made up of representatives from the public and private sectors, in addition to skills providers. The interim chair of the GBSLEP Board is Steve Hollis, former Midlands Chairman of KPMG and Aston Villa. This followed the resignation of Andy Street, now former Managing Director of John Lewis, who stood down from the position in September 2016 after serving since 2011 in order to seek the Conservative nomination for Mayor of the West Midlands.

Since January 2013, the GBSLEP has been working with Michael Heseltine on proposals to create a Single Local Growth Fund to enable LEPs to accelerate economic development. In May 2013, the GBSLEP published its growth plan for Greater Birmingham, titled The Strategy for Growth: Delivering Growth.

== Geography and economic data ==
The LEP area covers the geographical boundaries of the local authorities of Birmingham, Bromsgrove, Cannock Chase, East Staffordshire, Lichfield, Redditch, Solihull, Tamworth and Wyre Forest.

In total, the LEP area - consisting of the Birmingham and Solihull core, along with Southern Staffordshire and Northern Worcestershire - has as a population of nearly two million, contains 835,000 jobs and has a GVA of about £34 billion.

The core area of Birmingham and Solihull have a population of 1.23 million and contain many of the economic drivers of the conurbation such as Birmingham Airport, Birmingham city centre, four major universities and international meeting places such as the National Exhibition Centre.

Southern Staffordshire comprises the four local authority areas to the north: Cannock Chase, Lichfield, Tamworth and East Staffordshire (based upon Burton and Uttoxeter). It has a population of 380,000 with considerable numbers commuting to and from Birmingham.

Northern Worcestershire comprises three local authority areas to the south of Birmingham – Redditch, Bromsgrove and Wyre Forest (based upon Kidderminster). It has a population of 270,000 and has a similar relationship to Birmingham and Solihull as that of Southern Staffordshire. There is considerable commuting into Birmingham and Solihull, but also commuting out from the core city.

== Birmingham City Centre Enterprise Zone ==
The Birmingham City Centre Enterprise Zone is one of the major projects for the GBSLEP, with the potential to create 40,000 new jobs, add £2 billion a year to the economy and make available 1.3 million sq metres of floorspace over the lifetime of the project.

Birmingham City Centre Enterprise Zone, comprises 26 sites across the city centre covering 68 hectares in seven clusters at Westside, Snow Hill District, Eastside, Southern Gateway, Digbeth Creative Quarter, Birmingham Science Park Aston and the Jewellery Quarter.

These sites are focussed on the business and financial services, Information and Communication Technology, creative industries and digital media sectors which are already clustered in the city centre and present significant growth opportunities.

The Chancellor of the Exchequer, George Osborne, formally launched the prospectus detailing the investment sites in March 2013.

== The Greater Birmingham Project ==
In March 2012 the UK Prime Minister David Cameron asked former Deputy Prime Minister, Michael Heseltine, to report to the Chancellor of the Exchequer George Osborne and the Secretary of State for Business Vince Cable as to how wealth might be more effectively created in the UK. The Chancellor announced the terms of the review on 21 March 2012 and offered the support of a cross departmental team of officials to assist in the task.
The result was ‘No Stone Unturned’ – a report with a national scope that included 89 recommendations by Heseltine and focused on the way that changes in Government organisation and funding could be beneficial to driving localised growth, particularly in the cities.

The report was launched at Birmingham Town Hall on October 30, 2012 with GBSLEP Chair Andy Street and Birmingham City Council Leader Sir Albert Bore joining Heseltine to outline the report. The document received significant support from the business community and, in particular, Local Enterprise Partnerships, which were identified as powerful drivers of economic growth in the report.

Following the launch at Birmingham's Town Hall, the GBSLEP approached Heseltine and asked him if they could work together to explore the opportunities that could arise in Greater Birmingham if the economic recommendations in ‘No Stone Unturned’ were implemented.

The Prime Minister gave his support to the project, saying that he was delighted that business and civic leaders wanted to come together to consider and plan the economic and commercial future of the region in light of Michael Heseltine's report.

Work began immediately following a launch event for the Greater Birmingham Project on 3 January 2013, following which more than 200 economic development partners across Greater Birmingham inputted into the report. On 17 March 2013, in advance of the Chancellor's Budget, Michael Heseltine presented the results of his work with stakeholders in Greater Birmingham.

This report, the Greater Birmingham Project: The Path To Local Growth outlined how the GBSLEP would take forward the proposals contained in ‘No Stone Unturned’.
