= Knowle, West Midlands =

Village in the West Midlands, England

Coordinates: 52.388093°N 1.73181°W

Knowle
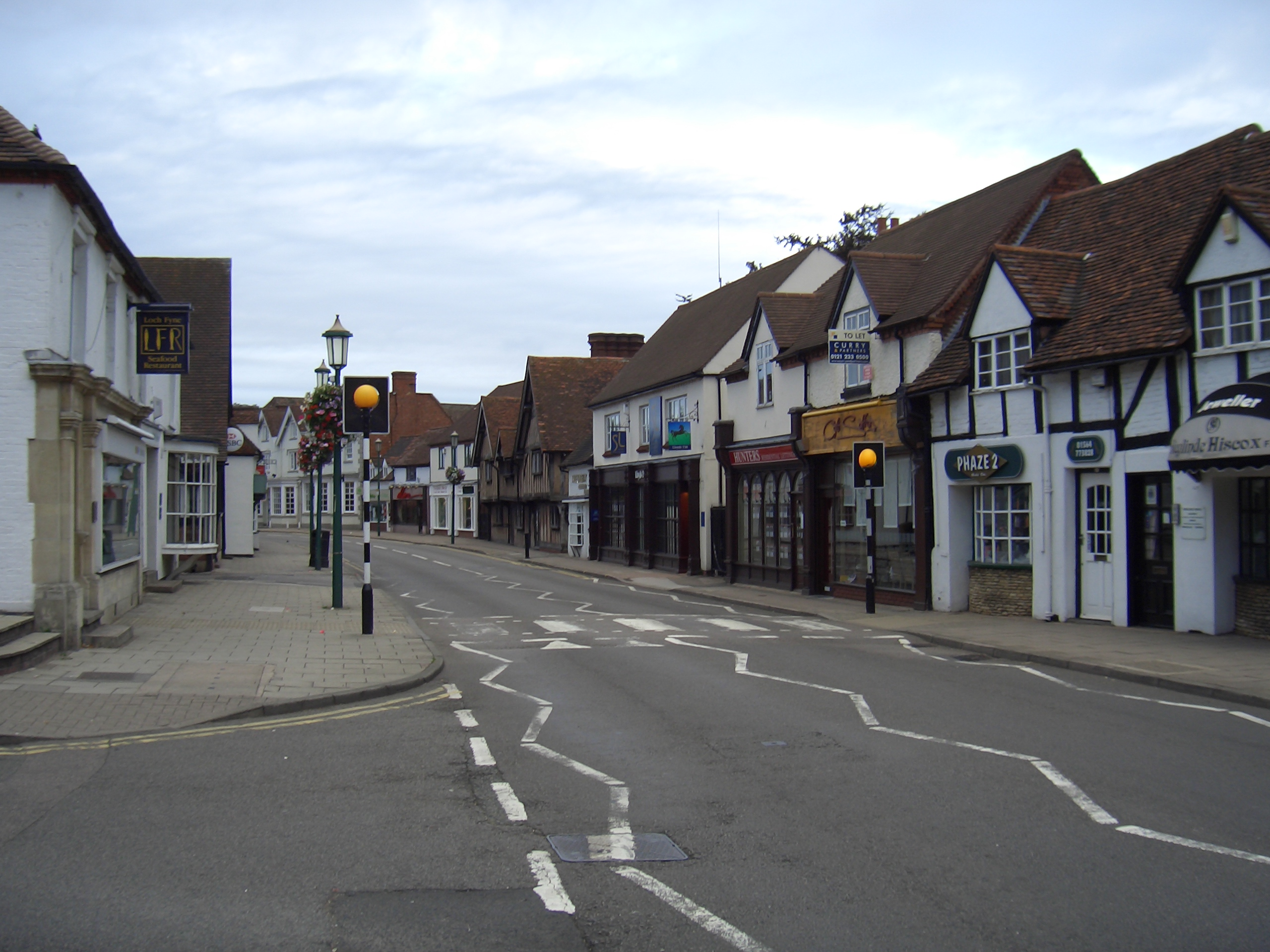
- Knowle High Street

- Location within the West Midlands
- Population: 10,678 (2001, ward)
- OS grid reference: SP182767
- Metropolitan borough: Solihull
- Metropolitan county: West Midlands
- Region: West Midlands
- Country: England
- Sovereign state: United Kingdom
- Post town: Solihull
- Postcode district: B93
- Dialling code: 01564
- Police: West Midlands
- Fire: West Midlands
- Ambulance: West Midlands
- UK Parliament: Meriden and Solihull East

Knowle /ˈnoʊl/ is a large village situated 3 miles (5 km) east-southeast of the town of Solihull, in the county of the West Midlands, England. Knowle lies within the Arden area of the historic county boundaries of Warwickshire, and since 1974 it has been part of the Metropolitan Borough of Solihull. It lies 2.5 miles from the Warwickshire border and had a recorded population of 10,678.

Knowle is in the parliamentary constituency of Meriden and Solihull East. It is contiguous to the south with the similar-sized communities of Dorridge and Bentley Heath, both of which are mainly residential in nature. The affluent district of Copt Heath is a suburb of Knowle to the north, with Tilehouse Green to the south.

== History ==
Formerly a chapelry, in 1866 Knowle became a civil parish. On 1 April 1932, the parish was abolished to form Solihull Urban, part also went to Balsall and Lapworth. In 1931, the parish had a population of 2,982.

== Amenities ==
Knowle has many shops. Most of these are located on the High Street, though there are a number of side roads and a shopping precinct. Knowle Library is maintained by Solihull Council in a building called Chester House dating back to Tudor times. At the rear of the building a knot garden has been restored. The small shopping area also has restaurants of all varieties, making Knowle a popular destination for dining out.

=== Recreation ===
Knowle is near to the Grand Union Canal which links Birmingham to London. Knowle Locks are a flight of five locks (originally six until around 1930) near the canal bridge on Kenilworth Road. Recreation areas include Knowle Park, which has a children's play area, tennis courts, football field and plenty of open space. There is also another children's playing field owned by the National Trust near Knowle Primary School, and in the smaller village of Bentley Heath, there is a newly refurbished park, near the highly rated school, of the same name. There is also Knowle F.C., Knowle Village Cricket Club who play in Division 2 of the Warwickshire Cricket League, after 3 promotions in three years, and the exclusive Copt Heath Golf Club. The Silhillians Sports Club is nearby, the home venue of Silhillians Rugby Union Football Club which is the home of Warwickshire Hockey as well as Old Silhillians Hockey Club.

There are also many clubs in the village for all ages. There are various Scout and Guide groups including a karate class and church groups. The Knowle Society exists to help maintain the village and its heritage. Knowle Local History Society also holds a wealth of historical information about the village and its people from very early times. Knowle also has drama groups and a village hall and Knowle and Dorridge Round Table meet locally.

=== Housing and schools ===
Knowle has two schools, a Church of England primary school with a nursery and a secondary school, Arden Academy, which also caters for Dorridge, Bentley Heath and Hockley Heath. In September 2006, a sixth form centre commenced with over 50 students. The project cost approximately £4 million and has attracted students from many of the surrounding schools. A new design and technology block called 'The Smart Centre' has also been recently completed with another similar building which has also recently been completed. They are considered to be well performing schools, even considering the advantaged catchment area.

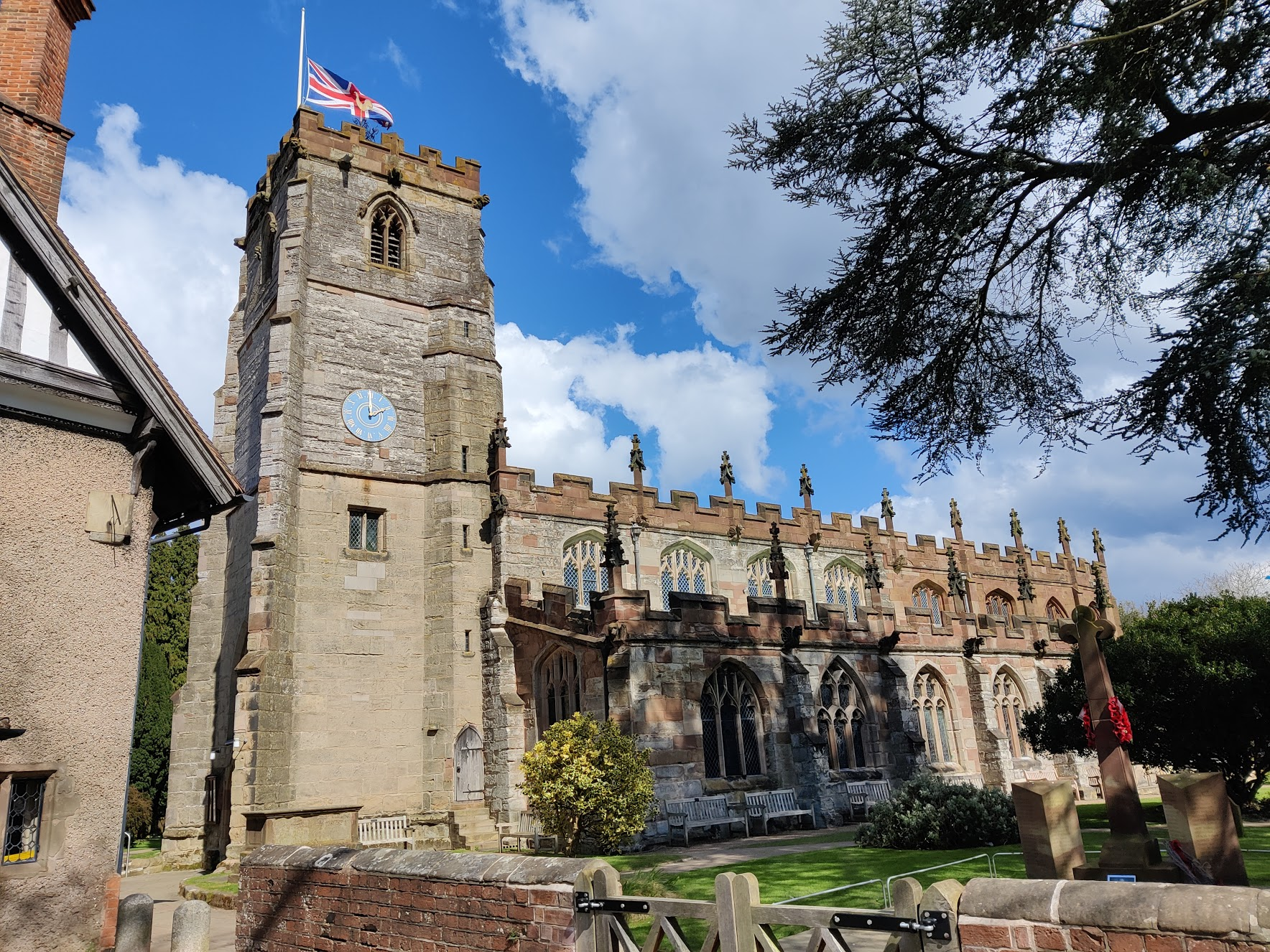
Church of St. John the Baptist, St. Lawrence and St. Anne

The main church is a Church of England parish church and there is a United Reformed Church on Station Road. The parish church offers many services using modern equipment, the old Guild house and much newer St. John's Hall.

The housing in Knowle is mainly detached or semi-detached with the occasional terraced street and some apartment blocks. More recently, developers have bought up housing for demolition and are building "windfall developments" of apartments on its outskirts. House prices are considerably higher than the national average due to the demand for housing in the highly affluent southeastern fringes of the West Midlands conurbation and high achieving schools.

== Community groups ==
Local community organisations include the Knowle Society, a neighbourhood forum, Round Table, Lions Club, and several Scout groups.

Knowle, Dorridge and Bentley Heath Neighbourhood Forum was formed in 2015 to bring together the people from the three adjoining villages to contribute to the neighbourhood plan, a statutory planning document that outlines how residents would like to see the villages develop in the future.

== Transport ==
The village lies on the A4141 road and is close to the M42 motorway. Knowle does not have its own railway station, but nearby Dorridge railway station, on the Chiltern Main Line, was previously known as 'Knowle and Dorridge' and for a period just as 'Knowle'. Hampton-in-Arden station lies a few miles north on the Coventry-Birmingham (West Coast) line and Birmingham International railway station is nearby for express services to London Euston. Knowle is also close to Birmingham Airport and is linked to Solihull by bus services A3 and A3W operated by Landflight. Junction 5 of the M42 motorway runs a little over a mile from the western edge of the village.

The Grand Union Canal Birmingham Main Line lies to the east of Knowle, between Birmingham to the north and Leamington Spa to the south and east. A set of locks are named after the village.

== Nearby places of interest ==
Surrounding villages include Bentley Heath, Dorridge, Hampton-in-Arden, Balsall Common, Hockley Heath, Henley-in-Arden and Heronfield. To the northwest is Solihull and Birmingham, to the east Coventry, and to the south Warwick, Leamington Spa and, further afield, Stratford-upon-Avon.

== Notable residents ==
- Jasper Carrott, comedian
- Karren Brady, businesswoman
- John Wyndham, science fiction writer
- Steve Bruce, football manager
- Peter Withe, footballer
- Trevor Francis, footballer
