= Solihull West and Shirley =

UK Parliament constituency (since 2024)

Coordinates: 52.40°N 1.82°W

- Borough constituency for the House of Commons
- Boundaries since 2024
- Boundary of Solihull West and Shirley in West Midlands region
- County: West Midlands county
- Electorate: 70,537 (2023)
- Major settlements: Shirley, Solihull

Current constituency
- Created: 2024
- Member of Parliament: Neil Shastri-Hurst (Conservative)
- Seats: One
- Created from: Solihull (Majority); Meriden (Minority)

Solihull West and Shirley is a constituency of the House of Commons in the UK Parliament. The constituency was created as a result of the 2023 Periodic Review of Westminster constituencies and was first contested at the 2024 general election. It is represented by Neil Shastri-Hurst of the Conservative Party.

The constituency name refers to the suburban town of Shirley and the western areas of the Metropolitan Borough of Solihull. This is part of a boundary review that resulted in the borough being split between three Westminster constituencies.

== Constituency profile ==
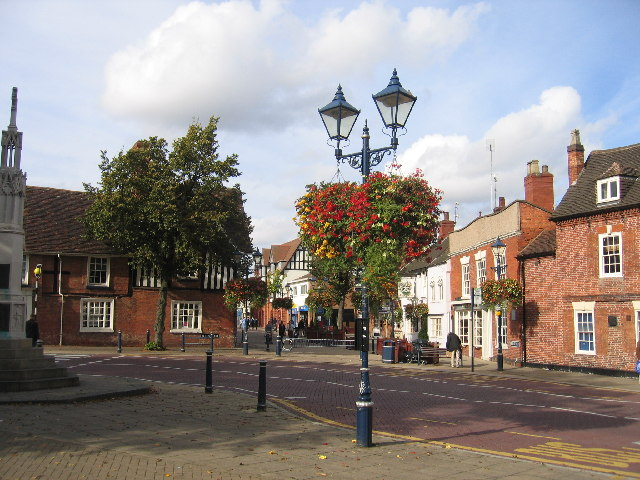
New Road, Solihull

Solihull West and Shirley is a constituency in West Midlands county in England, within the Metropolitan Borough of Solihull. It covers the town centre and southern neighbourhoods of Solihull, the town of Shirley, the suburban neighbourhoods of Olton and Monkspath and the outlying villages of Dickens Heath and Cheswick Green.

Solihull and Shirley are affluent, suburban towns on the outskirts of Birmingham. They are located around 6 miles (9.7 km) south-east of the city centre and form part of the wider West Midlands conurbation. Unlike the rest of this area, Solihull largely avoided industrialisation and remained a small market town until its 20th-century suburban expansion. Solihull mostly consists of detached properties whilst a majority of households in Shirley are denser, semi-detached houses. House prices across the constituency are generally higher than the UK average and considerably higher than the rest of the West Midlands region.

Solihull West and Shirley has an above-average retired population and a low proportion of young adults. Residents have high rates of income and homeownership, and the child poverty rate is around half the nationwide figure. They are generally well-educated and a high proportion work in the manufacturing and business administration sectors. The percentage of residents claiming unemployment benefits is low. White people made up 77% of the population at the 2021 census. Asians, mostly of Indian or Pakistani origin, were the largest ethnic minority group at 16%.

The constituency is politically mixed at the local borough council; Solihull and the outlying villages are represented by Conservatives, Shirley by Green Party and Reform UK councillors and the northern suburbs by Liberal Democrats. An estimated 52% of voters in Solihull West and Shirley supported leaving the European Union in the 2016 referendum, identical to the UK-wide figure.

== Boundaries ==
The constituency is composed of the following (as they existed on 1 December 2020):

- The Metropolitan Borough of Solihull wards of: Blythe; Lyndon; Olton; St. Alphege; Shirley East; Shirley South; Shirley West.

It contains the following areas:

- Blythe ward (17.9% of this constituency) from the previous Meriden constituency (abolished)
- The majority (82.1%) of the previous Solihull constituency (abolished)

== Members of Parliament ==
Solihull prior to 2024

Election	Member	Party
2024	Neil Shastri-Hurst	Conservative

== Elections ==
=== Elections in the 2020s ===
General election 2024: Solihull West and Shirley
Party	Candidate	Votes	%	±%
Conservative	Neil Shastri-Hurst	16,284	34.7	−26.2
Labour	Deirdre Fox	11,664	24.9	+5.4
Liberal Democrats	Ade Adeyemo	7,916	16.9	+1.2
Reform	Mary McKenna	7,149	15.3	N/A
Green	Max McLoughlin	3,270	7.0	+3.0
Independent	Julian Knight	594	1.3	N/A
Majority		4,620	9.8	−31.6
Turnout		46,877	65.0	−5.8
Registered electors		71,813		
Conservative hold		Swing	−15.8	

== See also ==
- List of parliamentary constituencies in the West Midlands (county)
- List of parliamentary constituencies in West Midlands (region)
