= Culture, Media and Sport Committee =

UK House of Commons select committee

The Culture, Media and Sport Select Committee, formerly the Digital, Culture, Media and Sport Select Committee, is one of the select committees of the House of Commons, established in 1997. It oversees the operations of the Department for Digital, Culture, Media and Sport which replaced the Department for National Heritage.

== Chairs ==
Committee chairs include those listed below.

Name	Start	End	Party	Constituency
Gerald Kaufman	17 April 1992	12 July 2005	Labour	Manchester Gorton
John Whittingdale	14 July 2005	11 May 2015	Conservative	Maldon and East Chelmsford (2005–2010)
John Whittingdale	14 July 2005	11 May 2015	Conservative	Maldon (2010–2025)
Jesse Norman	18 June 2015	18 July 2016	Conservative	Hereford and South Herefordshire
Damian Collins	19 October 2016	6 November 2019	Conservative	Folkestone and Hythe
Julian Knight	29 January 2020	10 January 2023	Conservative (2020–2022)	Solihull
Julian Knight	29 January 2020	10 January 2023	Independent (2022–2023)	Solihull
Damian Green; Acting	10 January 2023	31 March 2023	Conservative	Ashford
Julian Knight	31 March 2023	24 April 2023	Independent	Solihull
Damian Green; Acting	25 April 2023	17 May 2023	Conservative	Ashford
Caroline Dinenage	17 May 2023	present	Conservative	Gosport

=== Chair elections ===
From June 2010 chairs of select committees have been directly elected by a secret ballot of the whole House of Commons using the alternative vote system. Candidates with the fewest votes are eliminated and their votes redistributed until one remaining candidate has more than half of valid votes. Elections are held at the beginning of a parliament or in the event of a vacancy.

Chair	Party	Constituency	First elected	Method
Dame Caroline Dinenage	Conservative	Gosport	17 May 2023	Elected by the House of Commons
As Digitial, Culture, Media and Sport Select Committee
Julian Knight	Conservative/Independent	Solihull	29 January 2020	Elected by the House of Commons
Damian Collins	Conservative	Folkestone and Hythe	12 July 2017	Elected by the House of Commons
As Culture, Media and Sport Select Committee
Damian Collins	Conservative	Folkestone and Hythe	19 October 2016	Elected by the House of Commons
Jesse Norman	Conservative	Hereford and South Herefordshire	17 June 2015	Elected by the House of Commons
John Whittingdale	Conservative	Maldon (Maldon and East Chelmsford 1997–2010)	11 July 2005	Elected by the Select Committee (and the House of Commons in 2010)
Gerald Kaufman	Labour	Manchester Gorton	14 July 1997	Elected by the Select Committee
As National Heritage Select Committee
Gerald Kaufman	Labour	Manchester Gorton	27 April 1992	Elected by the Select Committee

9 September 2024
Candidate	1st round	
Candidate	Votes	%
Dame Caroline Dinenage	Unopposed	
Not redistributed		
Valid votes		

17 May 2023
Candidate	1st round	
Candidate	Votes	%
Dame Caroline Dinenage	198	51.7
Damian Collins	100	26.1
Damian Green	85	22.2
Not redistributed		
Valid votes	383	

29 January 2020
Candidate	1st round	
Candidate	Votes	%
Julian Knight	283	50.8
Damian Collins	274	49.2
Not redistributed		
Valid votes	557	

12 July 2017
Candidate	1st round	
Candidate	Votes	%
Damian Collins	Unopposed	
Not redistributed		
Valid votes		

19 October 2016
Candidate	1st round	
Candidate	Votes	%
Damian Collins	302	56.8
Helen Grant	230	43.2
Not redistributed		
Valid votes	532	

17 June 2015
Candidate	1st round		2nd round		3rd round		4th round	
Candidate	Votes	%	Votes	%	Votes	%	Votes	%
Jesse Norman	221	36.8	240	40.6	268	47.2	319	60.2
Graham Stuart	157	26.2	164	27.7	178	31.3	211	39.8
Damian Green	93	15.5	97	16.4	122	21.5	Eliminated	
Damian Collins	87	14.5	90	15.2	Eliminated			
Jason McCartney	42	7.0	Eliminated					
Not redistributed			9	1.5	32	5.3	70	11.7
Valid votes	600		591		568		530	

9 June 2010
Candidate	1st round	
Candidate	Votes	%
John Whittingdale	Unopposed	
Not redistributed		
Valid votes		

== Membership ==
Members are as follows.

Member	Party	Constituency
Caroline Dinenage MP (Chair)	Conservative	Gosport
Bayo Alaba MP	Independent (Note: Suspended from Labour.)	Southend East and Rochford
Gill German MP	Labour	Clwyd North
Nigel Huddleston MP	Conservative	Droitwich and Evesham
Alison Hume MP	Labour	Scarborough and Whitby
Rupa Huq MP	Labour	Ealing Central and Acton
Liz Jarvis MP	Liberal Democrats	Eastleigh
Tom Rutland MP	Labour	East Worthing and Shoreham
Jeff Smith MP	Labour	Manchester Withington
Jo Stevens MP	Labour	Cardiff East
Cameron Thomas MP	Independent (Note: Suspended from Liberal Democrats.)	Tewkesbury

=== Changes since 2024 ===
Date	Outgoing Member & Party	Constituency	→	New Member & Party	Constituency	Source
9 December 2024	Mims Davies MP (Conservative)	East Grinstead and Uckfield	→	Damian Hinds MP (Conservative)	East Hampshire	Hansard
27 October 2025	James Frith MP (Labour)	Bury North	→	Vicky Foxcroft MP (Labour)	Lewisham North	Hansard
27 October 2025	Tom Rutland MP (Labour)	East Worthing and Shoreham	→	Anneliese Midgley MP (Labour)	Knowsley	Hansard
27 October 2025	Paul Waugh MP (Labour)	Rochdale	→	Jeff Smith MP (Labour)	Manchester Withington	Hansard
13 November 2025	Zöe Franklin MP (Liberal Democrats)	Guildford	→	Cameron Thomas MP (Liberal Democrats)	Tewkesbury	Hansard
15 September 2026	Damian Hinds MP (Conservative)	East Hampshire	→	Nigel Huddleston MP (Conservative)	Droitwich and Evesham	Hansard
26 October 2025	Vicky Foxcroft MP (Labour)	Lewisham North	→	Gill German MP (Labour)	Clwyd North	Hansard
26 October 2025	Natasha Irons MP (Labour)	Croydon East	→	Alison Hume MP (Labour)	Scarborough and Whitby	Hansard
26 October 2025	Anneliese Midgley MP (Labour)	Knowsley	→	Tom Rutland MP (Labour)	East Worthing and Shoreham	Hansard
26 October 2025	Jo Platt MP (Labour)	Leigh and Atherton	→	Jo Stevens MP (Labour)	Cardiff East	Hansard

== 2019-2024 Parliament ==
The chair was elected on 29 January 2020, with the members of the committee being announced on 2 March 2020.

After the previous Chair Julian Knight recused himself from Parliament, Damian Green was selected as the Acting Chair of the committee. He held this role until Dame Caroline Dinenage was elected as the new Chair on 17 May 2023.

Member	Party	Constituency
Julian Knight MP (Chair)	Conservative	Solihull
Kevin Brennan MP	Labour	Cardiff West
Steve Brine MP	Conservative	Winchester
Philip Davies MP	Conservative	Shipley
Clive Efford MP	Labour	Eltham
Julie Elliott MP	Labour	Sunderland Central
Damian Green MP	Conservative	Ashford
Damian Hinds MP	Conservative	East Hampshire
John Nicolson MP	Scottish National Party	Ochil and South Perthshire
Jo Stevens MP	Labour	Cardiff Central
Giles Watling MP	Conservative	Clacton

=== Changes 2019-2024 ===
Date	Outgoing Member & Party	Constituency	→	New Member & Party	Constituency	Source
11 May 2020	Jo Stevens MP (Labour)	Cardiff Central	→	Alex Davies-Jones MP (Labour)	Pontypridd	Hansard
9 November 2020	Philip Davies MP (Conservative)	Shipley	→	Heather Wheeler MP (Conservative)	South Derbyshire	Hansard
19 October 2021	Damian Hinds MP (Conservative)	East Hampshire	→	Simon Jupp MP (Conservative)	East Devon	Hansard
19 October 2021	Heather Wheeler MP (Conservative)	South Derbyshire	→	Jane Stevenson MP (Conservative)	Wolverhampton North East	Hansard
7 March 2022	Alex Davies-Jones MP (Labour)	Pontypridd	→	Rupa Huq MP (Labour)	Ealing Central and Acton	Hansard
24 April 2023	Julian Knight MP (Chair, independent)	Solihull	→	Vacant		Hansard
17 May 2023	Vacant		→	Dame Caroline Dinenage MP (Chair, Conservative)	Gosport	Hansard
15 January 2024	Kevin Brennan MP (Labour)	Cardiff West	→	Alex Sobel MP (Labour)	Leeds North West	Hansard

== See also ==
- Parliamentary committees of the United Kingdom
