= Olton =

Area in Solihull, England

Coordinates: 52.4377°N 1.8058°W

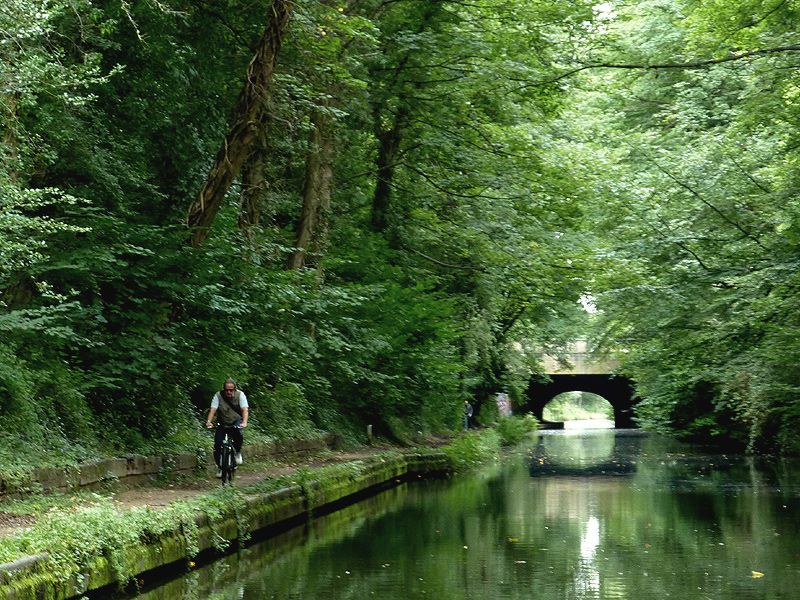
- Grand Union Canal

- Location within the West Midlands
- Population: 12,167 (2011 census, ward)
  - London: 117 mi (188 km)
- Metropolitan borough: Solihull
- Metropolitan county: West Midlands
- Region: West Midlands
- Country: England
- Sovereign state: United Kingdom
- Post town: Solihull
- Postcode district: B91, B92
- Dialling code: 0121
- Police: West Midlands
- Fire: West Midlands
- Ambulance: West Midlands
- UK Parliament: Solihull

Olton is a suburban village within the Metropolitan Borough of Solihull in the West Midlands, England. Originally known as Ulverlei, the lords of the manor moved their seat in the 13th century and formed a new settlement, at the junction of two major roads. It was then that the name 'Oulton' (meaning 'old town') began to be used to distinguish the village from nearby Solihull. Historically within the county of Warwickshire, the village has gradually become contiguous with Solihull to the southeast and Birmingham to the northwest, though it retains the character of a large independent village.

It is located on the A41 road between Solihull town centre 4 miles (6.4 km), Acocks Green, 2 miles (3.2 km) and Birmingham 5.7 miles (9.2 km). Dating back over a 1,000 years, it is a now a residential suburb. Many of the large houses built in St. Bernard's Road, Grange Road and Kineton Green Road during the Victorian and Edwardian period form part of one of Solihull's conservation areas.

== History ==
Olton means 'old town' and is the site of the manor of Ulverlei from where Solihull was founded. Ulverlei has been translated to mean Wulfhere's clearing or meadow. Wulfhere was the first Christian king of all of Mercia, from the end of the 650s until 675. Wulfhere's father, Penda, was killed in 655 fighting against Oswiu of Northumbria. Penda's son Peada became king under Oswiu's overlordship, but was murdered a year later. Wulfhere came to the throne when Mercian nobles organised a revolt against Northumbrian rule in 658, and drove out Oswiu's governors. As he was a youth, Wulfhere had been kept in hiding until he came of age.

After the absorption of Mercia into the rest of England, Ulverlei became the property of the Earls of Mercia, who if not descendants of the royal house were their successors. The first of these was Leofric, husband of Godiva, heroine of the Coventry legend, and the earldom descended through his son Ælfgar to Edwin, his grandson, who was in possession at the time of the Norman Conquest. Perhaps, because of the royal connection, William I granted the lands to Christina, who was granddaughter of King Edmund Ironside.

The Domesday Book of 1086 records Ulverlei as part of the lands of Christina, sister of Edgar the Ætheling, the last male of the house of Cerdic of Wessex, the original ruling dynasty of England. It states, "In Coleshill Hundred Christina holds 8 hides in Ulverlei from the King. Land for 20 ploughs. In lordship 1; 3 slaves. 22 villagers with a priest and 4 smallholders have 7 ploughs. Meadow, 12 acres; woodland 4 leagues long and 1/2 league wide; when exploited, value 12s. The value was £10; now £4. Earl Edwin held it."

Shortly after the Domesday Book was compiled in 1086, Christina "took the veil" entering the nunnery of Romsey Abbey in Hampshire. Her lands were granted to Ralph de Limesy whose family held Ulverlei until his great-granddaughter married Hugh de Odingsells, whose family were thought to be of Flemish origin. William De Odingsells succeeded his father in 1238 and it was in his time that the new village of Solihull began to develop.

That Ulverley stood where Olton now does is evident from the survival of the place names of Ulverley Green and the Ulleries. Ulverley Green close to the Birmingham-Warwick Road is the probable site of the original Saxon manor house. The site was described by William Hutton

"Four miles from Birmingham on upon the Warwick Road, entering the parish of Solihull in Castle Lane, is Ulverley, in doomsday Ulverlei. Trifling as this place now seems it must have been the manor house of Solihull, under the Saxon heptarchy, but went to decay so long ago as the conquest. The manor was the property of the Earls of Mercia, but whether their residence is uncertain. The traces of a moat remain, which are triangular, and enclose a wretched farmhouse of no note; (named Manor House Farm) one of the angles of the moat is filled up and becomes part of Castle Lane, which proves that Ulverley went into disuse when Hogg's moat was erected; it also proves that the lane terminated here, which is about 200 yards from the turnpike road. The great width of the lane, from the road to Ulverley, and its singular narrowness from thence to Hogg's moat, is another proof of its antiquity. If we pursue our journey half a mile further along this lane which, by the way, is scarcely passable, it will bring us to Hogg's moat."

This site is now the scheduled ancient monument of Hobs Moat, standing back from Lode Lane. The Hugford family occupied it after the Odingsells, Burman suggested that the name could as easily come from the Hugfords as the Odingsell's, as Hutton calls it Hoggs Moat in his 1782 description. However, Dugdale believed it derived from "Odingsells moat" and states he has seen Odingsells incorrectly written as "Hodingsells" and believes the corruption came from that. The Reverend Pemberton wrote that, "the moat, surmounted as it would have been by a stockade, would have been a formidable obstacle to assault" The Odingsells name is still to be found in the modern road name of Odensil Green built on the site of Odensil Farm.

Probably due to the relocation of the lords of the manor to the new settlement of Solihull, Olton declined in comparison and remained largely agricultural until the opening of Olton railway station in 1869 and the development of St Bernard's Road. Part of this road appears on the 1839 Tithe map and, in 1869, a new road was constructed to link this road with the Warwick Road. Originally named Windmill Road, it had become St Bernard's Road by 1872, named after the seminary that was being built then. The first house to be constructed in the road is thought to be Elmhurst (no. 21), which was used for a gathering of 200 people in 1872.

== Housing ==
Many of the properties in Olton (B91) are detached and from the Victorian and Edwardian eras, these form part of Solihull conservation areas. Data revealed that the most expensive postcode in the Birmingham area was Olton in Solihull.

== Landmarks ==
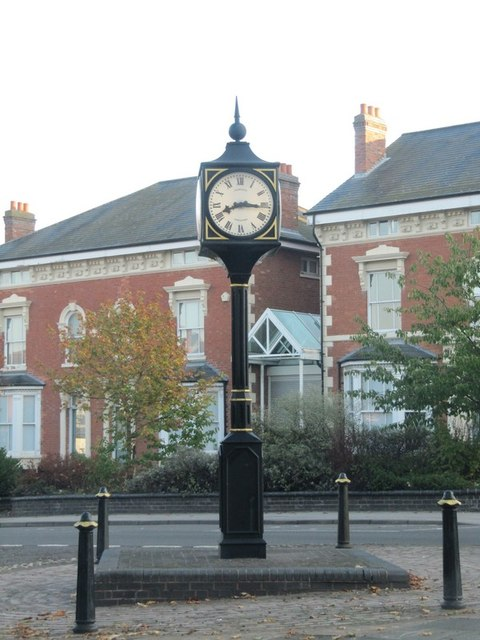
Olton Clock

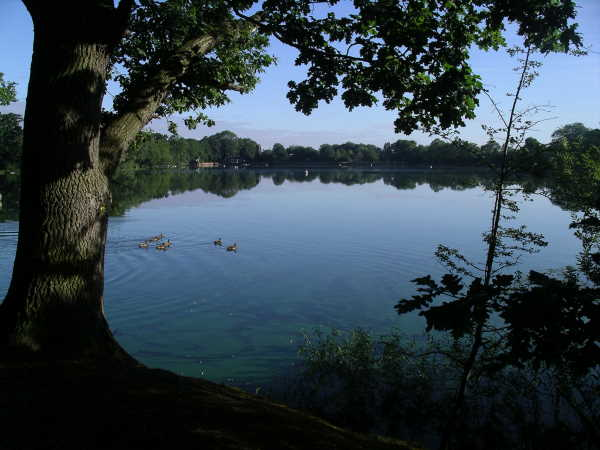
Olton Mere

The scheduled monument of Hobs Moat is a moated island of ditches and banks, alongside which are the earthworks of a medieval hollow way. Excavation, geophysical and field survey carried out between 1985 and 1986 revealed pottery found in a trench excavated across the inner rampart and interior indicating a 13th-century construction date, with later modifications to the enclosing earthworks. The remains of a number of medieval buildings were found and in addition a late medieval/early post-medieval shed-like structure. The activity on the site during the 17th century and later appears to be agricultural. A survey carried out in October 1997 by RCHME concluded that the site was probably a homestead or hunting lodge.

Olton Mere was created as a reservoir to act as a feeder for the Grand Union Canal, which was opened in 1799. The mere was formed from marshland fed by Folly Brook (now Hatchford Brook) and was designed to hold 150 locks full of water, but this was not achieved until the mere was extended in 1834. It is the largest of the few areas of open water in Solihull and supports a large number of waterfowl. The woodland surrounding the mere has remained undisturbed for many years, providing an important habitat for plants and animals.

Sailing on the mere started in 1900 when five residents of St Bernard's Road leased the reservoir from the canal company. A club was formed for sailing, fishing and shooting, although shooting was suspended in 1926 owing to a shortage of wildfowl.

== Governance ==
Politically, the Olton ward has recently leaned towards liberalism. Since 1973, the three seats on Solihull Council have been shared by Conservative and Liberal (later, Liberal Democrat) councillors. Honor Cox of the Liberal Democrats held the ward from 1991 until her death on 1 November 2010. However, for several years now all three seats have been held by the Liberal Democrats. Olton has a strong residents' association that liaises with Solihull Council and other bodies to improve the locality.

Nationally, Olton is a ward of the Solihull constituency whose member of Parliament is Julian Knight, (Conservative), who replaced Lorely Burt, the first Liberal Democrat MP for Solihull, at the 2015 election. Olton was included in the West Midlands electoral region of the European Parliament.

== Transport ==
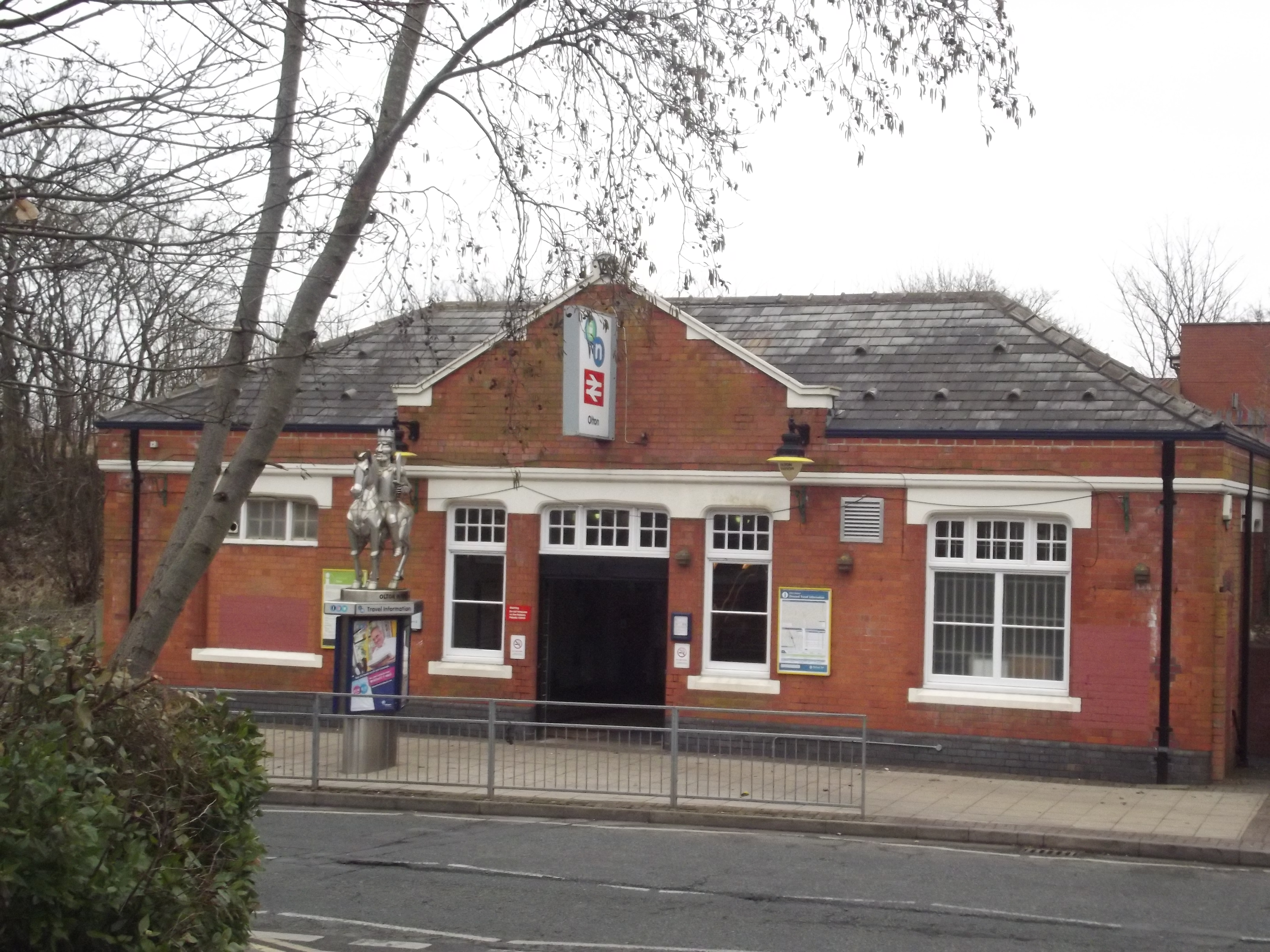
Olton Railway Station

- The Grand Union Canal and the Leamington Spa to Birmingham railway line pass through the village. Olton railway station situated in approximately the geographical centre of the area is served by London Midland to Birmingham, Dorridge and Leamington Spa.
- The West Midlands Warwick Road bus No 4 operated by National Express West Midlands runs along the A41 linking Olton with Solihull in the south and Birmingham to the north.
- Motorway access is via junction 5 of the M42 at Knowle 4.3 miles (6.9 km) away with links to the M5, M6 and M40 motorways.
- The nearest airport is Birmingham Airport situated 5.5 miles (8.9 km) to the North.
- National Exhibition Centre (NEC) is a short 15 min drive via the A41 or M42 and is adjacent to Birmingham Airport and Birmingham International railway station.
- The new High Speed 2 line will have a new stop called Birmingham Interchange and will be adjacent to the NEC and Birmingham Airport which is a short drive away.

== Education ==
- Nurture Nest Nursery
- Olton Primary School
- Kineton Green Primary School
- Langley Primary School
- Langley School
- Lyndon School Humanities College
- Oak Cottage School
- Our Lady of Compassion Catholic Primary School
- Reynalds Cross Special School
- St Margaret's CofE Primary School
- Ulverley Junior & Infant School previously Ulverley County Junior and Infant School

== Religious sites ==
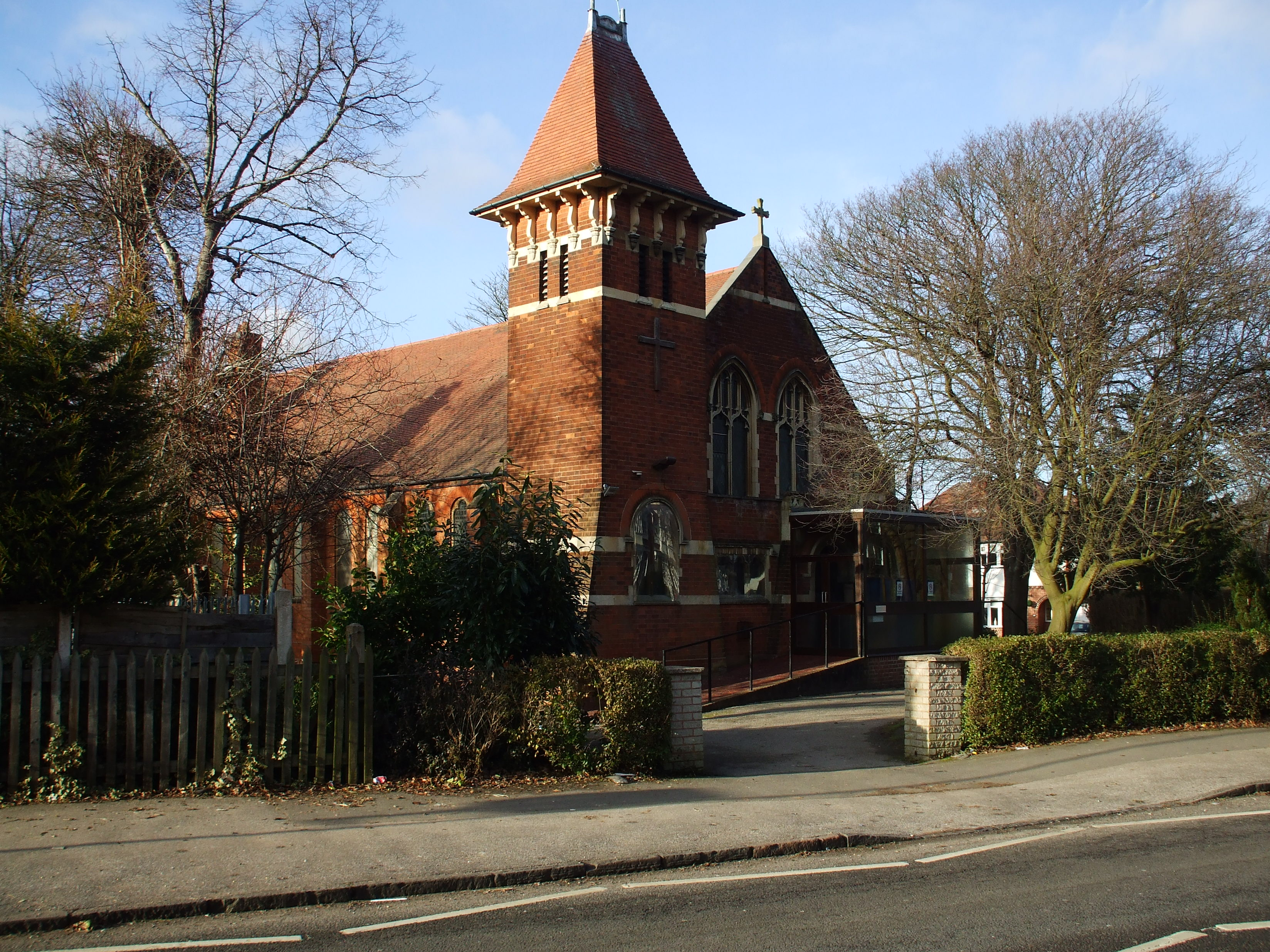
United Reformed Church

Situated at the junction of the Warwick Road with St Bernards Road and Kineton Green Road is the parish church of St. Margaret's, begun in 1880 as a chancel and completed by B. Corser in 1896. It has rock faced walls, no tower and round piers with well carved naturalistic flower capitals.

To the south is the Roman Catholic Olton Friary. Built in 1873 as St Bernard's Catholic Seminary by Bishop William Bernard Ullathorne, the first Catholic bishop of Birmingham, it closed in 1889 when the bishop's successor moved the seminary to Oscott. The building was purchased by the Capuchin Friars and became the Franciscan Monastery of the Immaculate Conception. The friars left on 10 January 1981 and the Sacred Heart Fathers and Brothers of Bétharram took over the running of the parish.

There are also the Olton Baptist Church, which meets at Langley School on Kineton Green Road. The former United Reformed church on Kineton Green Road is now redundant and has been sold for redevelopment (November 2018). It's currently a part of "The Olton Project".

On the Warwick Road just by the railway bridge is the former Primitive Methodist Chapel which appears on early 20th century maps: the building is now a bridal shop.

Located on Monastery Road the Solihull and District Hebrew Congregation hold regular religious services at their Solihull Synagogue as well as running a wide range of social activities.

== Sports and leisure ==
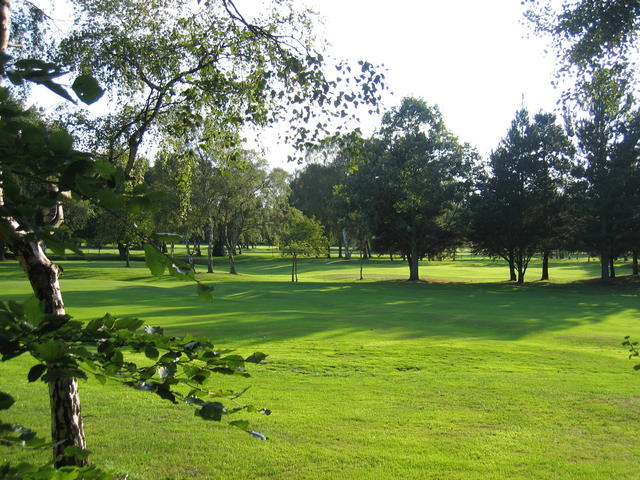
Robin Hood Golf Course

- Two golf clubs, Robin Hood Golf Club and Olton Golf Club, lie in the wealthy southern part of Olton.
- The West Warwickshire Sports Club, which is in Grange Road, has tennis, football and hockey facilities.
- Olton Mere was created as a reservoir to act as a feeder for the Warwick and Birmingham Canal, which was opened in 1799. The mere was formed from marshland fed by Folly Brook (now Hatchford Brook) and was designed to hold 150 locks full of water, but this was not achieved until the mere was extended in 1834. It is the largest of the few areas of open water in Solihull and supports a large number of waterfowl. The woodland surrounding the mere has remained undisturbed for many years, providing an important habitat for plants and animals. There is no public access to the mere, which has been designated a Site of Special Scientific Interest for nature conservation. However, there is a good view of the mere from the trains travelling between Solihull and Olton. The Olton Mere Sailing Club also has a membership category for those who wish to have walking access to the Mere.

== Notable people ==
- Alfred John Bostock Hill, cricketer
- Edith Blackwell Holden, author, artist and art teacher
- Frank Horton, vice-chancellor of the University of London 1939–45
- Felicity Kendal, actress
- Jack Grealish, footballer
- Gary Gardner, footballer
- Frederick William Lanchester, polymath and engineer
- George Lloyd, 1st Baron Lloyd, politician, born at Olton Hall 1879
- Bernard William Quaife, cricketer
- Harry Sutcliffe, musician
- Johnnie Walker, disc jockey
