= Damian Green =

British politician (born 1956)

The Right Honourable Damian Green
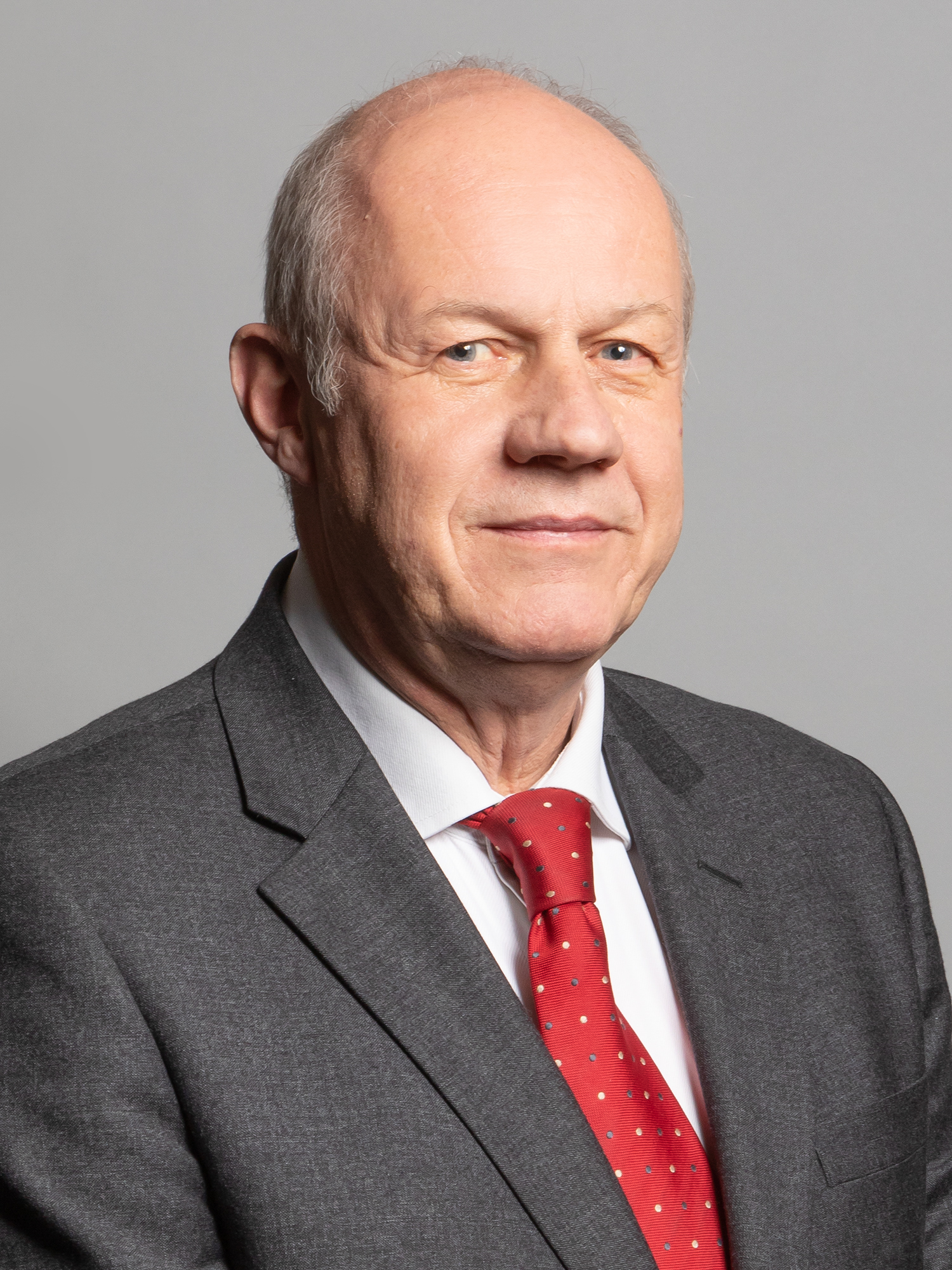
- Official portrait, 2020

First Secretary of State
- In office 11 June 2017 – 20 December 2017
- Prime Minister: Theresa May
- Preceded by: George Osborne^{[a]}
- Succeeded by: Dominic Raab^{[b]}

Minister for the Cabinet Office
- In office 11 June 2017 – 20 December 2017
- Prime Minister: Theresa May
- Preceded by: Ben Gummer
- Succeeded by: David Lidington

Secretary of State for Work and Pensions
- In office 14 July 2016 – 11 June 2017
- Prime Minister: Theresa May
- Preceded by: Stephen Crabb
- Succeeded by: David Gauke

Minister of State for Policing and Criminal Justice
- In office 4 September 2012 – 14 July 2014
- Prime Minister: David Cameron
- Preceded by: Nick Herbert
- Succeeded by: Mike Penning

Minister of State for Immigration
- In office 13 May 2010 – 4 September 2012
- Prime Minister: David Cameron
- Preceded by: Phil Woolas
- Succeeded by: Mark Harper

Chair of the Culture, Media and Sport Committee (Note: Digital, Culture, Media and Sport Committee until April 2023.)
- Acting; 25 April 2023 – 17 May 2023
- Preceded by: Julian Knight
- Succeeded by: Caroline Dinenage
- Acting; 10 January 2023 – 31 March 2023
- Preceded by: Julian Knight
- Succeeded by: Julian Knight

Chair of the One Nation Conservatives Caucus
- In office 24 July 2019 – 30 May 2024
- Leader: Boris Johnson; Liz Truss; Rishi Sunak
- Preceded by: Nicky Morgan & Amber Rudd
- Succeeded by: position abolished

Member of Parliament for Ashford
- In office 1 May 1997 – 30 May 2024
- Preceded by: Keith Speed
- Succeeded by: Sojan Joseph

Shadow Cabinet portfolios
- 2001–2003: Education and Skills
- 2003–2004: Transport

Personal details
- Born: Damian Howard Green; 17 January 1956 (age 70) Barry, Wales
- Party: Conservative
- Spouse: Alicia Collinson
- Children: 2
- Education: Balliol College, Oxford
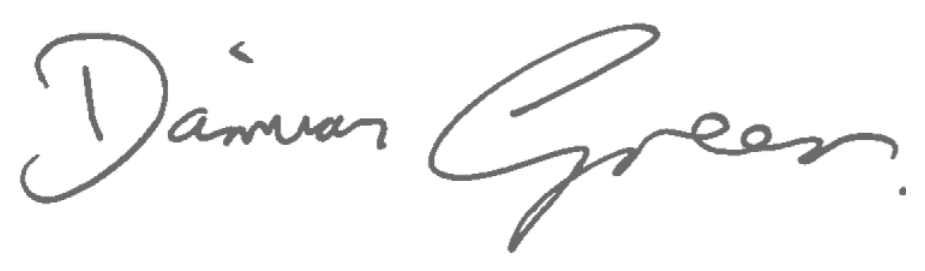
- Signature
- Website: Official website
- a. Office vacant from 13 July 2016 to 11 June 2017. b. Office vacant from 20 December 2017 to 24 July 2019.

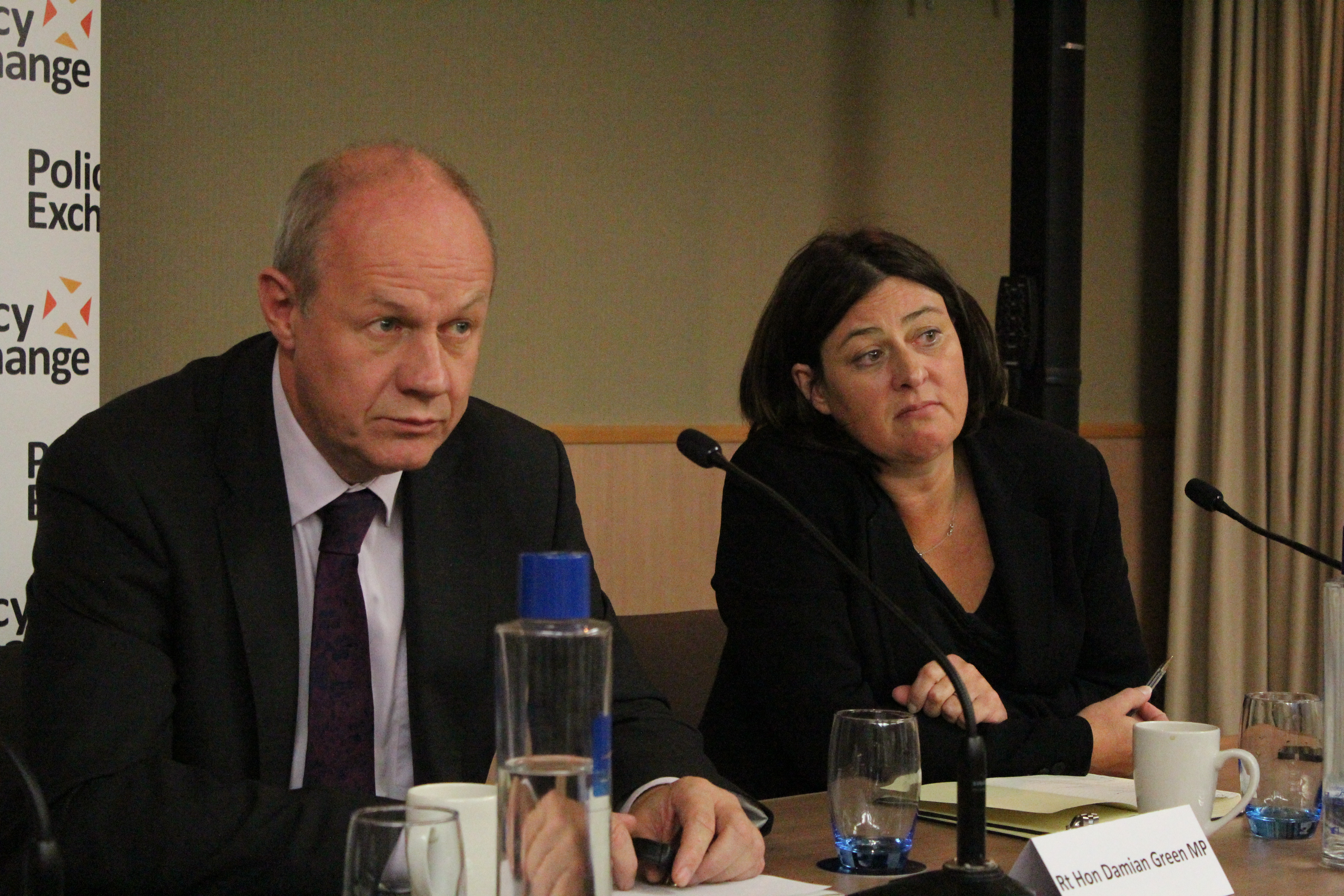
Green at a meeting of Policy Exchange in 2013

Damian Howard Green (born 17 January 1956) is a British politician. A member of the Conservative Party, he served as Member of Parliament (MP) for Ashford from 1997 to 2024. Green briefly served as Theresa May's deputy, holding the office of First Secretary of State, which functions as that of the de facto Deputy Prime Minister.

Green was born in Barry, Vale of Glamorgan, in Wales and studied philosophy, politics and economics at Balliol College, Oxford. He is married to the barrister Alicia Collinson, who was a contemporary of Theresa May at St Hugh's College, Oxford. After working as a journalist for the BBC, Channel 4 and The Times, he entered parliament at the 1997 general election by winning the seat of Ashford in Kent. Green served in several shadow ministerial positions, including Shadow Transport Secretary and Shadow Education and Skills Secretary. He came to national prominence in November 2008 after being arrested and having his parliamentary office raided by police, although no case was brought. He served in the Cameron–Clegg coalition until July 2014, first as Minister of State for Immigration and then as Minister of State for Police and Criminal Justice.

Green was appointed as Secretary of State for Work and Pensions by Prime Minister Theresa May in July 2016. Following the 2017 general election, he was promoted to First Secretary of State and Minister for the Cabinet Office. After the results of an inquiry into allegations that he sexually harassed a woman and viewed pornography on a work computer were published, it was found that he had breached the ministerial code and he was instructed to resign from the cabinet amidst the 2017 Westminster sexual misconduct allegations. He became chair of the One Nation Conservatives caucus following the formation of Boris Johnson's government in July 2019. In January 2023, he became acting chair of the Digital, Culture, Media and Sport Committee after Julian Knight temporarily stood aside, and again in April 2023 after Knight resigned.

At the 2024 general election, Green lost the Ashford constituency to Sojan Joseph of the Labour Party amidst a strong nationwide swing from the Conservatives. This represented the first time since 1929 that the seat had returned a non-Conservative MP.

== Early life and education ==
Damian Green was born in Barry, Glamorgan, Wales. He grew up in Reading and was educated at Reading School.

Green studied philosophy, politics and economics at Balliol College, Oxford. He was president of the Oxford Union in 1977 and was the vice-chairman of the Federation of Conservative Students (now known as Conservative Future) from 1980 until 1982.

During his time at Oxford, Green broke a wrist after a group of fellow students ambushed him and threw him into the River Cherwell. Reportedly the group included Dominic Grieve, who was later to serve alongside Green as a cabinet minister.

== Early career ==
In 1978, Green was appointed by BBC Radio as a financial journalist, before joining Channel 4 News as a business producer in 1982. He joined The Times for a year in 1984 as the business news editor before returning to television journalism and Channel 4 as the business editor in 1985. He became the City editor and presenter on Channel 4's Business Daily television programme in 1987 until he left television to join Prime Minister John Major's Policy Unit in 1992. Green had acted as an occasional speechwriter for Major since 1988. He left 10 Downing Street in 1994 to run his own consultancy in public affairs.

== Political career ==
Green stood unsuccessfully for election in Brent East at the 1992 general election, where he came second with 36.6% of the vote behind the incumbent Labour MP Ken Livingstone.

At the 1997 general election, Green was elected as MP for Ashford, winning with 41.4% of the vote and a majority of 5,345. He made his maiden speech on 20 May 1997. He was re-elected as MP for Ashford at the 2001 general election with an increased vote share of 47.4% and an increased majority of 7,359. At the 2005 general election, Green was again re-elected with an increased vote share of 51.6% and an increased majority of 13,298. At the 2010 general election, Green was again re-elected with an increased vote share of 54.1% and an increased majority of 17,297.

Green is an advocate of allowing illegal immigrants to return to the UK sooner. He has supported voluntary return for overstayers and other migrants in order to avoid deportation, claiming "we expect those with no right to be in the country to leave voluntarily". In 2011, in his role as Immigration Minister, he relaxed a five-year re-entry ban to two years He has stated that the illegal immigrants being in the UK for a "shorter period of time" was a positive and "saves money", although children kept being detained.

At the 2015 general election, Green was again re-elected, with a decreased vote share of 52.5% and an increased majority of 19,296.

Green was opposed to Brexit prior to the 2016 EU membership referendum.

Green is chairman of Parliamentary Mainstream, a vice-president of the Tory Reform Group and is a vice-chairman of the John Smith Memorial Trust.

At the snap 2017 general election, Green was again re-elected, with an increased vote share of 59% and a decreased majority of 17,478. He was again re-elected at the 2019 general election, with an increased vote share of 62.1% and an increased majority of 24,029.

=== Shadow ministerial career ===
While a backbencher, he was a member of the Culture, Media and Sport Select Committee from 1997 until his appointment to the frontbench by William Hague in 1998 as a spokesman on education and employment. He spoke on the environment from 1999 and was promoted to the shadow cabinet by Iain Duncan Smith in 2001 as the Shadow Secretary of State for Education and Skills.

In 2003, Michael Howard gave him the position of Shadow Secretary of State for Transport. In September 2004, he left the frontbench altogether of his own accord and joined the Home Affairs Select Committee.

Following the 2005 general election, Green returned to the shadow frontbench under the leadership of David Cameron as a spokesman on home affairs and shadow minister for immigration.

Whilst sitting as an MP he was a non-executive director of Mid Kent Water from 2005 to 2007, and of its successor company South East Water until 2010. Between July 2009 and February 2010, Green was paid £16,666.64 for 112 hours by South East Water for "attending meetings and offering advice" according to the House of Commons Record of Members Interests.

=== Police Minister ===
As Police Minister in the coalition government, Green called for increased partnerships between the police and the private sector.

=== Theresa May ministry ===
Green was appointed as Secretary of State for Work and Pensions by Theresa May in July 2016.

He was appointed as First Secretary of State on 11 June 2017 following the 2017 general election. He was also promoted to Minister for the Cabinet Office.

=== Candidacy for the 2024 election ===
With the 2023 boundary review foreshadowing substantial changes to the Ashford constituency, Green sought selection for the new seat of Weald of Kent. On 19 February 2023 he announced on Twitter that he had been unsuccessful. On 28 February he announced that he would seek selection for the revised seat of Ashford. Green's selection for Ashford was confirmed on 31 March 2023.

Green came second in the Ashford constituency at the 2024 UK general election.

== Controversies ==
=== 2008 arrest ===
Green was arrested by the Metropolitan Police at his constituency home on 27 November 2008 on suspicion of "aiding and abetting misconduct in public office" and "conspiring to commit misconduct in a public office". The documents were reported to include information politically embarrassing to the then-Labour government. He was later released on bail. In a statement to parliament on 3 December, Michael Martin, Speaker of the House of Commons, responsible for the security of the Palace of Westminster, stated that although the police undertaking the search had neither presented a search warrant nor given "the requisite advice that such a warrant was necessary", the search of the Parliamentary office had been undertaken with the express written consent of the Serjeant-at-Arms, Jill Pay, who had signed a consent form without consulting the Clerk of the House.

The arrest led to speculation about the apparent coincidence that it was authorised on the last day in office of Metropolitan Police Commissioner Sir Ian Blair. It was criticised by political figures and journalists. It was reported in The Andrew Marr Show that he believed he was the subject of a bugging operation, which would have required the authorisation of the Home Secretary. Jacqui Smith stated that she had not granted any such order. Green's constituency agent subsequently confirmed that a search of Green's property and car had been commissioned, but that no listening devices were discovered.

A junior Home Office civil servant, Christopher Galley, subsequently admitted leaking four "embarrassing" documents to Green and was sacked. On 16 April 2009, the Crown Prosecution Service announced that it was not going to bring a case against either Green or Galley as there was "insufficient evidence".

=== Expenses claims ===
During the UK parliamentary expenses scandal The Daily Telegraph newspaper revealed that, although Green's constituency is a 45-minute commute from Westminster, he claimed expenses for a designated second home in Acton, west London. Green has regularly claimed expenses up to the maximum of £400 for food. He has also claimed for the interest on his mortgage, for his council tax, and for his phone bills.

=== Sexual harassment and pornography allegations ===
During the 2017 Westminster sexual scandals revelations, a Cabinet Office inquiry was started into allegations Green sent suggestive text messages and "fleetingly" touched the knee of a young Conservative activist, Kate Maltby. He disputes this, stating it's "absolutely and completely untrue that I've ever made any sexual advances on Ms Maltby". Both Baroness Kennedy and journalist Rosamund Urwin stated that Maltby had made the claims to them over a year before making them public. Urwin published Facebook messages and time stamps, showing that Maltby had complained to her, and detailed her earlier experience with Green, within four minutes of receiving what she reported as an "inappropriate" text message from Green in 2016.

During this investigation, allegations emerged that pornography had been found on Green's work computer when he was arrested over leaks in 2008. He said this was a "political smear". The police detective computer forensics expert who examined the computer when Green was arrested rebutted this in early December 2017, stating: "The computer was in Mr Green's office, on his desk, logged in, his account, his name ... it was ridiculous to suggest anybody else could have done it". In December 2017 the police expert was being investigated by Scotland Yard for keeping copies of confidential material, unrelated to the case he was working on, and then releasing it to the public. Green denied that he downloaded or looked at such images. Green said that the claims made by the retired Bob Quick were "political smears". Metropolitan Police Commissioner Paul Stephenson confirmed that he was informed about the matter at the time but regarded it as a "side issue".

On 20 December 2017, Green was removed from his position as First Secretary of State; it was found that he had lied to colleagues over pornography found on his computer. The report concluded that Green's conduct as a minister had "generally been both professional and proper", but that regarding the allegations by Maltby, although the private nature of their meetings meant that it was "not possible to reach a definitive conclusion" regarding his behaviour towards her, the report found her account to be "plausible". In his resignation letter, Green said that he deeply regretted the distress to Maltby that the reaction to her article about him had caused, and although maintaining that he did not recognise the events described in it, he "clearly made her feel uncomfortable" and apologised for doing so. Theresa May had asked him to resign and accepted his resignation. She stated she had "greatly appreciated" his hard work and contribution to her team and that it was "right" that he had apologised to Maltby.

A few days later, Green faced calls to stand down as an MP, following the disclosure of a "dirty tricks" campaign which appeared to target his accuser. It emerged that text messages passed to the Mail on Sunday, allegedly sent between Maltby and Green before she made her complaint, had been edited and rewritten in order to inaccurately suggest that Maltby, rather than Green, had encouraged a continued close relationship and solicited a meeting between the two. After contacting Maltby prior to publication, the Mail on Sunday corrected one series of messages and the newspaper later issued a further post-publication correction acknowledging that it had published a second forged message and falsely attributed it to her. The faked message and subsequent article falsely accused of her of having flirtatiously texted Green that she regretted his absence from his party, because in his stead one of his aides had "been smooching the room on your behalf x".

The Conservative MP Anna Soubry, previously an ally of Green, told the Sunday Times that attempts to smear Maltby were "wrong and shameful". Another Conservative MP said: "It appears that Green's allies barely paused for breath after he apologised for the distress caused to Kate Maltby before launching an attack. It smacks of a dirty tricks campaign and is unhelpful to the government when it is still dealing with the fallout of the Westminster harassment scandal." Maltby and her supporters had accused Green of also being behind a negative, anonymously-briefed attack on her written by the Daily Mail journalist Andrew Pierce. Her parents, in a statement, responded angrily to claims made by Pierce that they disapproved of her actions and condemned "the attempted campaign in certain sections of the media to denigrate and intimidate her and other witnesses".

Writing in the Sunday Times, Maltby alleged that the Daily Mail attack had been coordinated by Green's team and formed part of a broader strategy of witness intimidation. Maltby alleged that two other women had intended to make allegations against Green, but "as a result" of the Daily Mail' coverage of her own complaint, "immediately backed out". In May 2018, the Daily Mail paid £11,000 towards Maltby's legal costs after she prepared to go to court regarding Pierce's article. The article was removed from the Mail's website without an admission of fault.

== Post-parliamentary career ==
Following his defeat at the 2024 election, Green was appointed as Chair of the Social Care Foundation.

== Publications ==
- ITN Budget Factbook, 1984, ITN
- ITN Budget Factbook, 1985, ITN
- ITN Budget Factbook, 1986, ITN
- Better BBC: Public Service Broadcasting in the '90s, 1990, Centre for Policy Studies ISBN 1-870265-77-7
- Freedom of the Airwaves, 1990, CPC ISBN 0-85070-806-0
- Communities in the Countryside, 1995. ISBN 1-874097-11-9
- The Cross Media Revolution: Ownership and Control, Edited by Damian Green, 1995, University of Luton Press ISBN 0-86196-545-0
- Regulating the Media in the Digital Age, 1997, European Media Forum
- 21st Century Conservatism, 1998
- The Four Failures of the New Deal, 1998, Centre for Policy Studies ISBN 1-897969-84-8

== Notes ==
Parliament of the United Kingdom
| Preceded by Keith Speed | Member of Parliament for Ashford; 1997–2024 | Succeeded by Sojan Joseph |
Political offices
| Preceded by Theresa May as Shadow Secretary of State for Education and Employment | Shadow Secretary of State for Education and Skills; 2001–2003 | Succeeded by Tim Yeo |
| Preceded by Tim Collins | Shadow Secretary of State for Transport; 2003–2004 | Succeeded by Tim Yeo as Shadow Secretary of State for Environment and Transport |
| Preceded by Phil Woolas as Minister of State for Borders and Immigration | Minister of State for Immigration; 2010–2012 | Succeeded by Mark Harper |
| Preceded by Nick Herbert | Minister of State for Policing and Criminal Justice; 2012–2014 | Succeeded by Mike Penning |
| Preceded by Stephen Crabb | Secretary of State for Work and Pensions; 2016–2017 | Succeeded by David Gauke |
| Vacant Title last held by George Osborne | First Secretary of State; 2017 | Vacant Title next held by Dominic Raab |
| Preceded by Ben Gummer | Minister for the Cabinet Office; 2017 | Succeeded by David Lidington |
