= Neil Shastri-Hurst =

British politician

Major Neil Shastri-Hurst MP
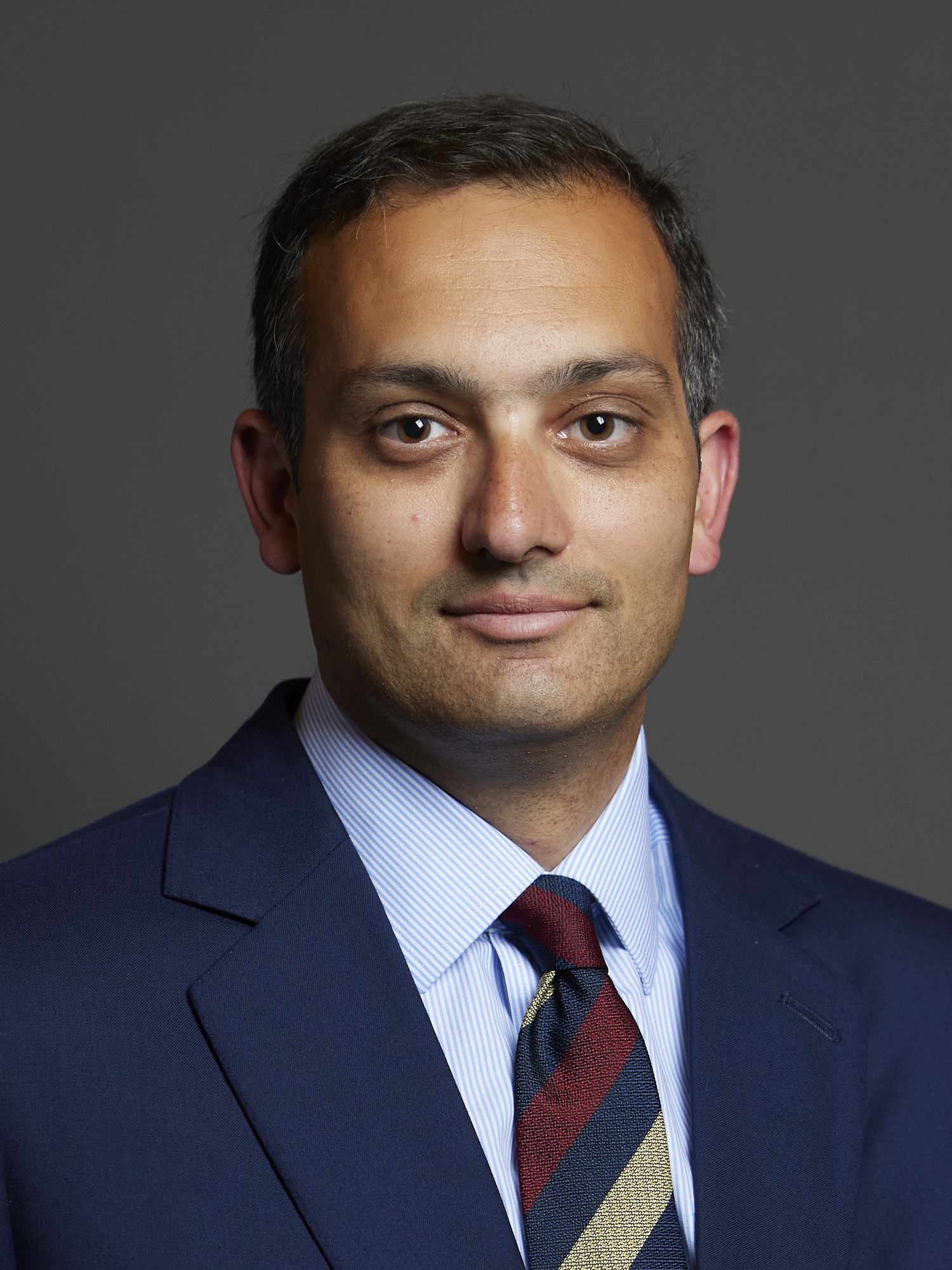
- Official portrait, 2024

Shadow Parliamentary Under-Secretary of State for Health and Social Care
- Incumbent
- Assumed office 31 August 2026
- Leader: Kemi Badenoch
- Preceded by: Luke Evans

Member of Parliament for Solihull West and Shirley
- Incumbent
- Assumed office 4 July 2024
- Preceded by: Constituency established
- Majority: 4,620 (9.8%)

Personal details
- Born: 1984 (age 41–42) Birmingham, England
- Party: Conservative
- Education: University of Nottingham
- Profession: Barrister, doctor (relinquished licence)

Military service
- Allegiance: United Kingdom
- Branch/service: British Army
- Years of service: 2006–2014
- Rank: Major
- Unit: Royal Army Medical Corps

Neil Shastri-Hurst (born 1984) is a British Conservative Party politician who has been the Member of Parliament for Solihull West and Shirley since 2024. He has been Shadow Parliamentary Under Secretary of State in the Shadow Health and Social Care Team since September 2026.

== Early life ==
Neil Shastri-Hurst was born and brought up in Birmingham, attending King Edward's School, Birmingham. His father was a general practitioner in Birmingham for three decades and his mother a nurse.

== Early career ==
He trained in medicine at the University of Nottingham, during which time he joined the Royal Army Medical Corps. He was granted a short service commission as a second lieutenant on probation on 1 August 2006 and promoted to lieutenant on probation on 1 August 2007. He was confirmed in his commission and promoted to captain on 6 August 2008. He was transferred from the active list to the Regular Army reserve of officers on 29 July 2011 and then from the reserve to the Territorial Army on 11 August that year. He was returned to the Regular Army reserve on 13 September 2013. His time in the British Army saw him serve both in the UK and overseas.

His most recent medical appointment was as an Honorary Consultant Trauma Co-ordinator for the Major Trauma Service at University Hospitals Birmingham. In addition to his clinical work, Neil was appointed a Medical Member of the Medical Practitioners Tribunal in 2016.

Shastri-Hurst retrained as a barrister specialising in healthcare related law.

Since 2019, Shastri-Hurst has been a member of No5 Chambers, specialising in healthcare, coronial, and personal injury law.

He was the Conservative candidate in the 2021 North Shropshire by-election.

== Parliamentary career ==
At the 2024 general election, Shastri-Hurst was elected to Parliament as MP for Solihull West and Shirley with 34.7% of the vote and a majority of 4,620. Shastri-Hurst won selection for the newly created seat over Conservative MP Nicola Richards.

Shastri-Hurst supported the Terminally Ill Adults (End of Life) Bill and served on the committee examining the legislation.

As co-chair of the All-Party Parliamentary Group on Defence Technology, Shastri-Hurst was investigated and found to have breached parliamentary standards by accepting funding from an arms manufacturer owned by the Israeli government. He apologised and resigned as chair in June 2025.

== Political opinions ==
Shastri-Hurst opposes banning of trail hunting. He is an advocate for integration of immigrants. He supports reform of the World Health Organization.

== Electoral history ==
General election 2024: Solihull West and Shirley
Party	Candidate	Votes	%	±%
Conservative	Neil Shastri-Hurst	16,284	34.7	−26.2
Labour	Deirdre Fox	11,664	24.9	+5.4
Liberal Democrats	Ade Adeyemo	7,916	16.9	+1.2
Reform	Mary McKenna	7,149	15.3	N/A
Green	Max McLoughlin	3,270	7.0	+3.0
Independent	Julian Knight	594	1.3	N/A
Majority		4,620	9.8	−31.6
Turnout		46,877	65.0	−5.8
Registered electors		71,813		
Conservative hold		Swing	−15.8	

Parliament of the United Kingdom
New constituency	Member of Parliament for Solihull West and Shirley; 2024–present	Incumbent
