= Olton Reservoir =

Reservoir in West Midlands, England

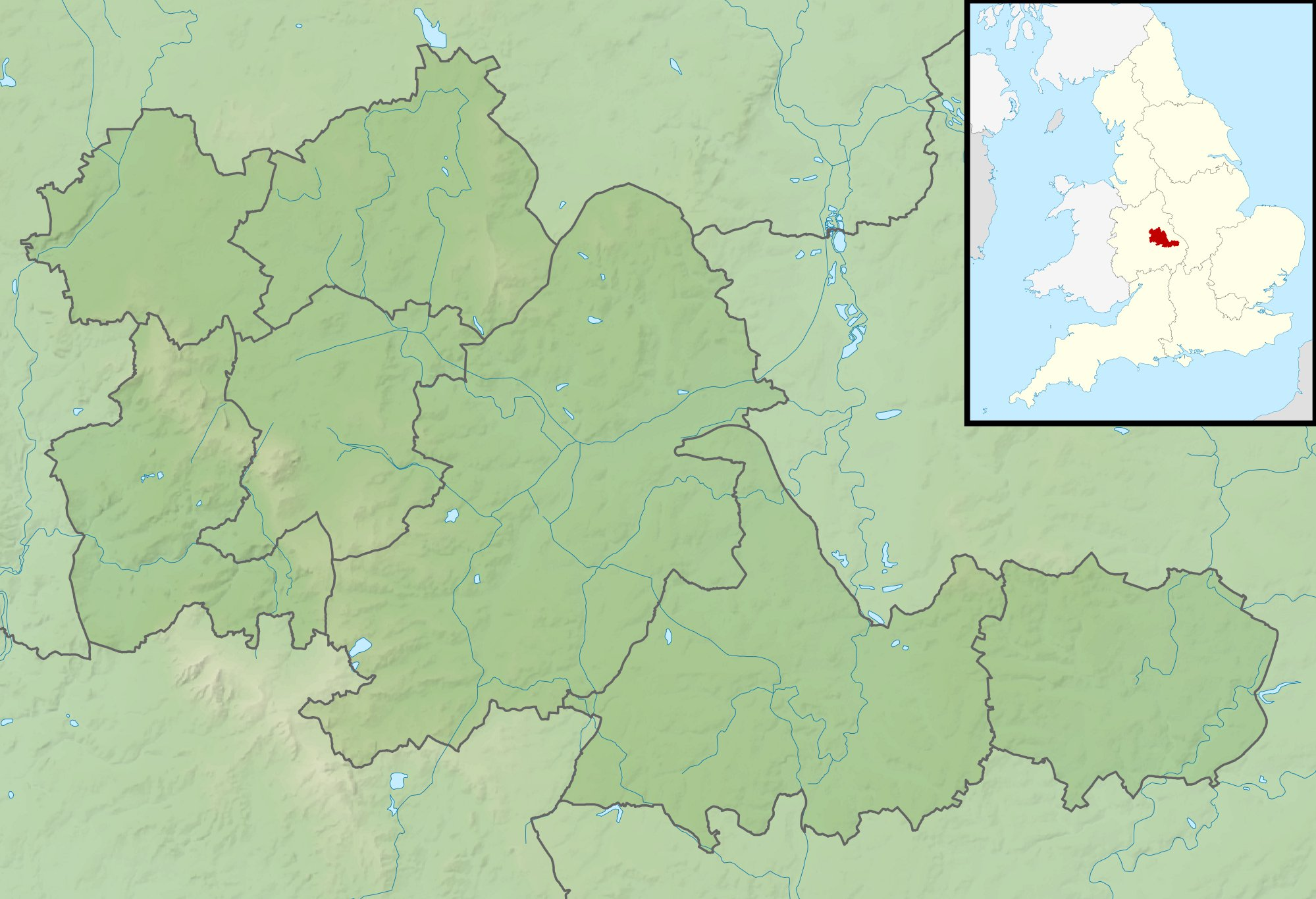
- Location within West Midlands county
- Location: Olton, West Midlands
- Coordinates: 52.43132°N 1.80434°W
- Type: canal reservoir
- Primary inflows: Folly Brook
- Primary outflows: via culvert to Grand Union Canal
- Basin countries: England
- Managing agency: Canal and River Trust
- Built: 1799
- Max. length: 695 metres (2,280 ft)
- Max. width: 200 metres (660 ft)
- Surface area: 126,000 square metres (31 acres)
- Average depth: 2.5 metres (8.2 ft)
- Water volume: 320,000m³ (70 million gallons)
- Shore length^{1}: 1.70 kilometres (1.06 miles)
- Website: https://www.oltonmere.co.uk/
- ^{1} Shore length is not a well-defined measure.

Olton Reservoir or Olton Mere (grid reference SP134815) is a canal feeder reservoir in the Olton district of Solihull, West Midlands, England.

The reservoir, constructed in 1799 to supply the Grand Union Canal, was formed from marshland fed by Folly Brook. It was designed to hold 150 locks full of water, but this was not achieved until it was extended in 1834. It is the largest of the few areas of open water in Solihull and supports numerous waterfowl.

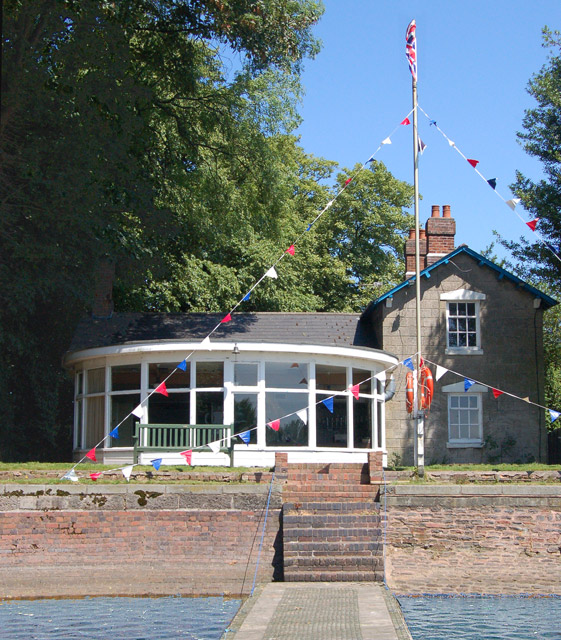
Olton Mere Sailing Club

The lake and its surroundings are privately owned by the Canal and River Trust and are leased to Olton Mere Sailing Club. The sailing club is run by a board of trustees.

== See also ==
- Canals of the United Kingdom
- History of the British canal system
