= Meral Hussein-Ece, Baroness Hussein-Ece =

British politician (born 1955)

The Right Honourable The Baroness Hussein-Ece OBE
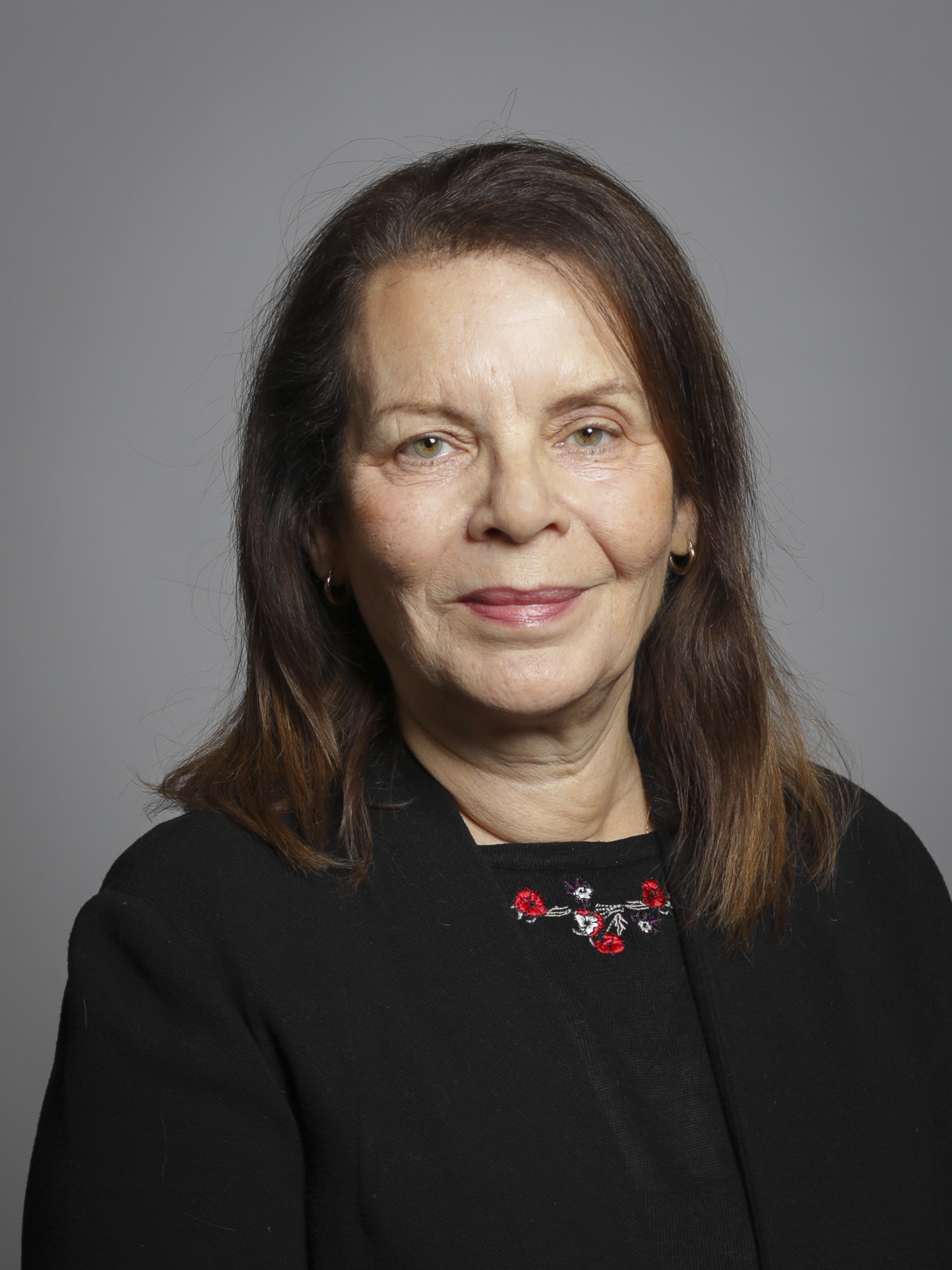

Liberal Democrat Women and Equalities Spokesperson
- In office 29 July 2015 – October 2016
- Leader: Tim Farron
- Preceded by: Jo Swinson
- Succeeded by: The Baroness Burt

Member of the House of Lords
- Lord Temporal
- Life peerage 25 June 2010

Islington Borough Councillor for Mildmay Ward
- In office 2 May 2002 – 6 May 2010
- Preceded by: Jennette Arnold
- Succeeded by: Joe Caluori

Personal details
- Born: 10 October 1955 (age 70) Islington, London
- Party: Liberal Democrats
- Children: 3

Meral Hussein Ece, Baroness Hussein-Ece, OBE ([ˈedʒe] EDGE-ey; born 10 October 1955) is a British Liberal Democrat member of the House of Lords. She is the first woman of Turkish Cypriot origin to be a member of either house of Parliament after she was appointed a Liberal Democrat working peer on 28 May 2010. She was the Liberal Democrat Spokeswoman for Equalities from 2015 until 2016, under leader Tim Farron.

== Early life ==
Baroness Hussein-Ece was born in Islington. Her Turkish Cypriot parents, Ayşe Cuma Abdullah (mother) and Hasan Nihat Hüseyin (father), came to the UK from Cyprus in the early 1950s, she has ties to the village of Anglisides. She later settled in Islington, North London. Ece and her second cousin Tracey Emin's paternal great-grandfather, Abdullah, was reportedly a Sudanese slave in the Ottoman Empire.

== Career ==
Ece originally studied art history and fine art at Sir John Cass School of Art, Architecture and Design, before going to work in local government and training as a librarian. She subsequently worked for Islington Council's Race Equality Unit, then went to work as a senior manager in the National Health Service, including as chief officer for Haringey Community Health Council.

She was elected as to Hackney Council as a Labour Party councillor for Clissold ward in 1994, and was Deputy Leader in 1995 and 1996. She was the first woman from a Turkish/Cypriot background elected to public office in the UK.

Following a split in the Hackney Labour group, in 1997 Ece joined the Liberal Democrats; she was re-elected to Hackney Borough Council in Dalston ward in 1998. She was instrumental in setting up the very first Turkish Women's Group, and establishing a domestic violence project for Turkish and Kurdish women in London.

In the local government elections of 2002, was elected as Liberal Democrat councillor for Mildmay ward on Islington Council. She was the Cabinet Member for Health and Social Care from 2002 to 2006, serving as chair of the Islington Health Partnership board and as a member of Islington Primary Care Trust board. She was also a non-executive director of Camden and Islington Mental Health and Social Care Trust.

After being re-elected in 2006, Ece was chair of the Overview and Scrutiny Committee from 2007 to 2009. In November 2009, Ece was appointed as a commissioner to the Equality and Human Rights Commission (EHRC). In November 2012, Hussein-Ece and Lord Simon Woolley were not reappointed to their roles and later claimed that they had been forced out because they were "too loud and vocal" about issues of race.

In May 2008, Ece was appointed by the Minister for Equalities, Harriet Harman MP to serve on the Government's Task Force to increase the numbers of ethnic minority women councillors in the UK.

Ece was awarded the OBE in the Queens New Year Honours 2009, for services to local government. She was chair of the Ethnic Minority Liberal Democrats (2007–10) and was a member of the Liberal Democrats Federal Executive Committee 2005–10, and advised Nick Clegg MP, Leader of the Liberal Democrats on community cohesion and minority ethnic communities.

It was announced by the UK Cabinet Office on 28 May 2010 that Hussein-Ece was to be appointed to the House of Lords. She was created a life peer on 25 June 2010 taking the title Baroness Hussein-Ece, of Highbury in the London Borough of Islington. She made her maiden speech at the House of Lords on 15 July 2010 in a debate on criminal justice.

In November 2012, she was awarded an Honorary Doctorate (DLitt) by Coventry University, for her work to promote equality for ethnic minorities in the UK, and contribution to peace in Cyprus.

In May 2011 Hussein-Ece apologised after she referred to customers in her local supermarket as "chavs". She claimed the word was not derogatory, but writers such as Polly Toynbee criticised her, arguing that the term was "acceptable class abuse by people asserting superiority over those they despise".

In 2015 she joined Tim Farron's Spokesperson team as the Liberal Democrat Spokesperson for Equalities.

== Personal life ==
She has 3 children.
