= Sir Martin Lindsay, 1st Baronet =

British soldier, explorer and Conservative politician (1905–1981)

Lieutenant Colonel Sir Martin Lindsay Bt CBE DSO
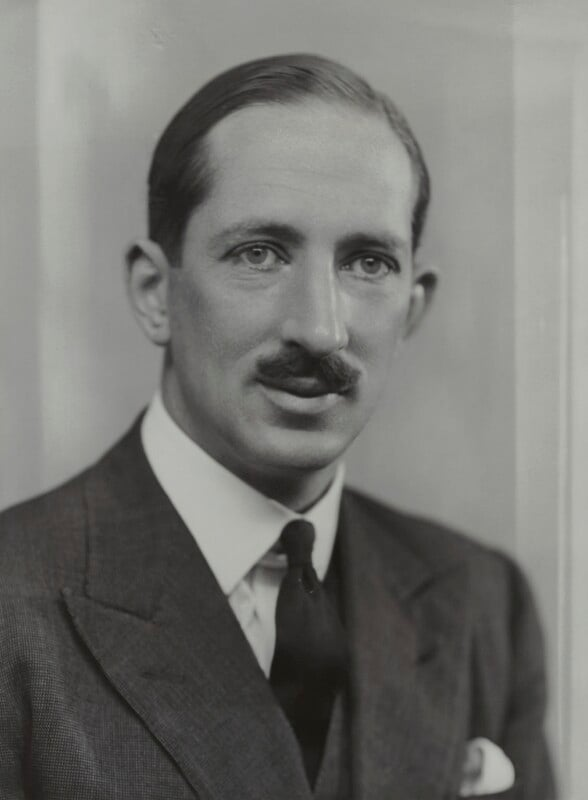
- Lindsay in 1936
- Born: 22 August 1905; London, England
- Died: 5 May 1981 (aged 75); Surrey, England
- Military career
- Allegiance: United Kingdom
- Branch: British Army
- Service years: 1923–1950
- Rank: Lieutenant-Colonel
- Service number: 32017
- Unit: Royal Scots Fusiliers
- Commands: 1st Battalion, Gordon Highlanders (1944–1945)
- Conflicts: Second World War
- Awards: Commander of the Order of the British Empire; Distinguished Service Order; Mentioned in Despatches (2); Polar Medal

Lieutenant Colonel Sir Martin Alexander Lindsay, 1st Baronet of Dowhill, CBE, DSO (22 August 1905 – 5 May 1981) was a British Army officer, polar explorer, politician and author.

He first came to national attention in the 1930s, as a Polar explorer in Greenland. During the Second World War, Lindsay held a staff role in the Norwegian campaign, where he became sharply critical of the operation’s failures. He later commanded a battalion in Northwest Europe, was wounded in action, Mentioned in Despatches twice, and awarded the Distinguished Service Order.

Immediately after the war, he went into politics and served as a Member of Parliament for nearly two decades. In 1962, he was awarded a Baronetage of the United Kingdom, being created Baronet of Dowhill in the County of Kinross.

== Early life ==
Lindsay was born to a long-established Scottish noble family and could trace direct descent, as 22nd in line to Sir William Lindsay of Rossie, 1st of Dowhill, a younger son of Sir Alexander Lindsay of Glenesk the third son of Sir David Lindsay, 6th Lord of Crawford. Martin Lindsay was himself the son of an officer in Britain's Indian Army who became a lieutenant colonel in the 2nd King Edward VII's Own Gurkha Rifles.

Lindsay was educated at Wellington College and at the Royal Military College Sandhurst.

== Army officer ==
In 1925, Lindsay passed out from the Royal Military College, Sandhurst and was commissioned as a second lieutenant in the Royal Scots Fusiliers.

Two years later, he was posted to Nigeria and seconded to the 4th Battalion, the Nigeria Regiment. During this period, Lindsay won Nigeria's Grand National horse race.

After his 13-month stint with the Arctic expedition he was posted with the 2nd Bat. of the Royal Scots Fusiliers to Shanghai.

== First expeditions ==
At the end of his two years in Nigeria in 1929, Lindsay undertook his first expedition, travelling from West to East Africa through the Ituri Rainforest in what was then called the Belgian Congo.

In 1930 he was appointed Surveyor to the British Arctic Air Route Expedition to Greenland, led by Gino Watkins. Expedition members included John Rymill and Freddie Spencer Chapman but, as a seasoned Army officer, Lindsay brought a disciplined organisational and administrative experience to the team. Lindsay later wrote up his experiences in a book Those Greenland Days (1932), paying tribute to Watkins' team building. The success of this expedition resulted in Lindsay and the other key expedition members being awarded the Polar Medal, with the clasp Arctic 1930–1931.

Lindsay enjoyed writing about explorers and, in 1933, followed up his success with The Epic of Captain Scott, his tribute to the famous explorer.

=== British Trans-Greenland Expedition ===
In 1934 Lindsay was the Leader of the British Trans-Greenland Expedition under the patronage of the Prince of Wales. The expedition was sponsored by several British government ministries and aimed to explore and map a 350-mile long stretch of Greenland which had not previously been visited but contained the highest mountains in the Arctic Circle. Andrew Croft was the photographer for the expedition; Lt. Daniel Godfrey was in charge of survey and navigation.

The expedition crossed Greenland from west to east, and succeeded in fixing the positions of many important features including Gunnbjørnsfjeld. On the return journey the team headed south-west to Amassalik (now Tasiilaq) and on their journey discovered the extent of the Crown Prince Frederick Range (Kronprins Frederik Bjerge). Lindsay's expedition set a new world record after sledging for 1,050 miles (700 of which were through unexplored territory).

When all three returned safe and well, the expedition was regarded as an unqualified success, with The Times devoting a leader to it. The Times observed that "for daring and success [it] will rank high in the long annals of polar exploration". Lindsay had also written his report of the expedition for The Times and in 1935 wrote a book, Sledge, based on these reports. His fame extended beyond Britain and in April 1935 he was awarded the Alexandre de la Roquette Gold Medal by the French Geographical Society for his leadership.

== Civilian interlude ==
In 1936, Lindsay left the army. He had married a distant cousin, Joyce Lindsay, in 1932 and they had a young family.

He moved to Lincolnshire where he was adopted as Conservative Party candidate for Brigg in June 1936. The constituency was held by Labour with a majority of only 203, and Lindsay began to attend social events in the constituency in an attempt to build up his chances of election.

He was a Deputy Lieutenant of Lincolnshire from 1938.

== Second World War ==
Lindsay wrote to The Times in April 1939 to support the introduction of conscription, based on his knowledge of the people of Brigg, stating that "so widespread is the determination of the British working man to 'Stop Hitler' that I do not believe there would be any opposition of importance".

=== Norwegian Campaign ===
Lindsay returned to soldiering 1939, on the outbreak of the Second World War and served in a staff appointment during the Norwegian campaign. It was just three years since he had left the Army. In the spring of 1940 Britain decided to send troops to Northern Norway and Lindsay, with his experience of organising Polar expeditions, was an obvious choice to help advise on the particular problems the climate and terrain could bring to military operations.

However he became deeply critical of the poorly organised and ill-prepared operation in Norway to the extent that he feared that Britain would lose the war unless important lessons were learned following the debacle. Lindsay was one of the first soldiers to reach London following the evacuation from Norway, and presented his candid account of the operation to members of His Majesty's Opposition such as Clement Attlee and Herbert Morrison. This report became known as the "Lindsay Memorandum" in which Lindsay recalled an operation riven with the utmost incompetence, which he contended went to the very top of the government. The evidence presented by Lindsay was used by Attlee in order to bring about a vote of censure against the leadership of the then Prime Minister Neville Chamberlain, which ultimately led to Chamberlain's resignation, the appointment of Winston Churchill and the creation of a coalition government. Lindsay's contribution to the Norwegian Campaign resulted in him being Mentioned in Despatches.

=== Subsequent operations ===
On 14 April 1943 Lindsay was appointed CO of the newly formed 9 Para. Taking over from the recently promoted Brigadier James Hill, Lindsay played a central role in training 9 Para ready for Operation Tonga. Lieutenant Colonel Lindsay held this position until 1 April 1944.

In July 1944 Lindsay was appointed second-in-command of the 1st Battalion The Gordon Highlanders, in the 51st Highland Division. He commanded the battalion in sixteen operations between July 1944 and May 1945, being again Mentioned in Despatches, wounded in action, and receiving the Distinguished Service Order. He ended the war as a lieutenant colonel.

As was already his pattern, he wrote up his experiences in So Few Got Through: The Diary of an Infantry Officer in 1946; this was followed by a recap of his Arctic exploits, Three Got Through: Memoirs of an Arctic Explorer the following year.

== Member of Parliament ==
Lindsay's political career had been put on hold during the war – he had resigned his Brigg candidacy – instead in June 1945, just after the war in Europe had ended, he was adopted as Conservative candidate for Solihull, a newly created constituency which was expected to be safely Conservative. His Labour opponent was the future cabinet minister Roy Jenkins, but Lindsay beat him by 5,049.

His maiden speech on 7 November 1945 dwelt on the problems of an international arms race between the United States and Soviet Union. Lindsay supported giving details of the atomic bomb to the latter "if she would agree to cooperate and take part in a mutual system of controls and inspections".

Early in his parliamentary career he concentrated on conditions for servicemen and ex-servicemen; in May 1946 he encouraged discharged officers to take up posts with the Colonial Office and with the Control Commission in occupied enemy countries. A week later he condemned the Germany Control Commission's publication "The British Zone in Germany" as "a miserable little rag" because it was a pale ghost of the Manchester Guardian. He was a firm opponent of nationalisation of the steel industry, which took place.

Lindsay spoke in October 1946 in support of German prisoners of war being allowed to remain in Britain and being allowed British citizenship, because of the shortage of skilled labour.

Although a generally moderate MP, Lindsay could be roused to anger. In April 1949, a criticism of the Conservative Party by Minister of Food John Strachey prompted Lindsay, recalling Strachey's association with Oswald Mosley, to ask "Is it in order for an ex-member of the Fascist Party ...", the rest of the sentence being drowned out by angry shouts from Labour MPs. The exchange between the two caused a major row involving many Members of Parliament.

== Journalism ==
Outside Parliament, Lindsay also contributed his journalistic skill, writing the text for a book about the House of Commons published in the "Britain in Pictures" series in 1947. In 1948, with debates on the House of Lords starting as a result of the Labour government's Parliament Bill, he wrote Shall We Reform 'the Lords'?, which discussed the options which might be taken.

He was Chairman of the West Midlands Area of Conservative and Unionist Associations from 1949 to 1952.

During the 1950 general election, Lindsay made a speech at Wellington, Shropshire in which he prophesied that Aneurin Bevan would soon take over as prime minister after Clement Attlee retired.

During the close Parliament of 1950–51, Lindsay played his part in harrying the Labour government. In November 1950 he won a spot in the ballot for Private Member's Bills and introduced a freedom of information Bill to give the press a statutory right to report the proceedings of public bodies. Lindsay's Bill ran out of time; he also supported the bill, that became statute, introduced by Labour MP Eirene White reforming the divorce laws. Early in 1951 he called on Belgium not to put General von Falkenhausen, the former German military governor, on trial for war crimes. Lindsay argued that Belgium had the least oppressive occupation of any nation.

== Churchill's second ministry ==
Lindsay was not offered any government posts when Churchill returned to office in 1951.

He pressed the new government to set up an all-party conference on House of Lords reform, and to abolish identity cards as soon as possible. Lindsay also supported a committee such as that run by Eric Geddes in 1920 to cut public expenditure, criticising "the Government's hitherto total failure to fulfil their election promises" to make a substantial economy.

He was appointed a Commander of the Order of the British Empire in 1952.

At the Coronation of Queen Elizabeth II, Lindsay served as a Gold Staff Officer.

He was a member of the Royal Company of Archers, the Queen's Body Guard for Scotland.

Writing in his constituency association's magazine in June 1954, he stated that Winston Churchill would retire before that autumn to make way for Anthony Eden and predicted that Harold Macmillan would be promoted to be the new Foreign Secretary. In the autumn he became interested in the problems of road congestion and tabled a motion urging a much increased road programme to solve it.

When Sydney Silverman proposed the abolition of capital punishment in 1956, Lindsay put down an amendment to retain it only for the murder of a police officer. Despite the significant employment in the car industry in his constituency, he once in parliament criticised workers in the industry for "shoddy workmanship", When the workers at British Motor Corporation were ordered on strike that summer, Lindsay pointed to the fact that 53% of workers had reported for work as usual to observe that it was an unpopular strike.

== 1956–1964 ==
Lindsay was one of the sponsors of a motion critical of the United States after the Suez Crisis. He was critical of the Macmillan government in July 1957 for not doing enough to tackle inflation, and led a group of three MPs who abstained on it. At the end of 1957 he criticised the mediocrity of many MPs and called for reforms to House of Commons procedures including ending all-night sittings, in a letter which prompted a long debate. At the end of January 1958 the House of Commons set up a Select Committee on the issue, with Lindsay criticising the continued denigration of Parliament by newspapers who were also damaging the royal family.

When the parliamentary group on Egypt and Syria was formed in June 1960, Lindsay was appointed chairman.

In November 1960 he protested that the Government should not sell its shares in Ford Motors of Dagenham without allowing MPs to express their views.

== Honours ==
In the New Years' Honours list of 1962, Lindsay was made a baronet.

Following a lecture tour of the United States early that year, in March he tabled a strongly worded motion attacking Lord Beaverbrook for authorising editorial comments attacking the royal family. Lindsay circulated to other Members of Parliament examples of coverage in the Daily Express, which he described as a "sustained vendetta".

He supported the Macmillan government's application to join the Common Market, commenting that it was difficult to find a banker or industrialist who did not think membership was essential.

Coat of arms of Sir Martin Lindsay, 1st Baronet
Crest A castle triple-towered Proper port Gules tower-caps Argent. Escutcheon Gules a fess chequy Argent and Azure between a mullet of the second in chief and the base barry undy Or and of the third in a dexter canton Argent a sinister hand couped apaume erect of the first. Supporters Two doves Proper gorged of collars chequy Argent and Azure. Motto Firmus Maneo

== Retirement announcement ==
Lindsay announced in March 1963 that he would leave politics at the next election, stating his intention to take life easier.

He abstained rather than support Macmillan on the Profumo affair.

Early in 1964 he called for an inquiry into the Public Trust Office, after discovering that it had lost a large sum of money in investments.

== Later life ==
In 1964 he was left $250,000 and a luxury Manhattan flat in the will of American philanthropist Florence Berlowitz Shaw (widow of George Hamlin Shaw and former wife of Bernard Pollak), whom he had escorted at social occasions in New York City. The will was disputed by Mrs Shaw's three stepchildren, but eventually upheld. A cousin living in North Wales also left him £20,000 the same year. Lindsay indulged his interest in horse racing by becoming a racehorse breeder.

Sir Martin married Joyce Lindsay (1904–1998), daughter of the Hon. Robert Hamilton Lindsay (a younger son of the 26th Earl of Crawford) and Mary Janet Clarke (daughter of Sir William Clarke, 1st Baronet) in 1932. Although sharing the same surname they are not closely related but share a common ancestor, Alexander Lindsay of Glenesk. Lady Lindsay divorced her husband in 1967 on grounds of his desertion. Later that year he took the Sunday Express to the Press Council over an article asking, after his two legacies, whether Sir Martin was "after a rich widow". The editor John Junor defended the story, but the Press Council upheld the complaint and deplored the form of journalism. The couple had three children including his heir apparent Ronald and only daughter Jacynth Rosemary, who married Lord Mark Fitzalan-Howard, son of Bernard Fitzalan-Howard, 3rd Baron Howard of Glossop.

On 1 August 1969, Lindsay married Loelia, Duchess of Westminster, a former wife of the 2nd Duke of Westminster. In 1973 an interview was conducted with Lindsay which featured in the episode Distant War, part of the highly acclaimed series The World at War, in which he recalled his critique of the Norwegian Campaign and the subsequent response to it.

Involved in business as chairman of several companies, Lindsay was chairman of the Standing Council of the Baronetage and published his final book, The Baronetage, in 1977 (2nd edition, Woking, 1979), recognised as the standard concise account of the dignity.

Parliament of the United Kingdom
New constituency	Member of Parliament for Solihull; 1945–1964	Succeeded by Percy Grieve
Baronetage of the United Kingdom
New title Granted by Queen Elizabeth II	Baronet (of Dowhill); 1962–1981	Succeeded by Ronald Alexander Lindsay
