= Lindsay Memorandum =

1940 account of the British Army's Norwegian Campaign

The Lindsay Memorandum was a report written by Sir Martin Lindsay, then a captain in the British Army, in which he detailed the various short-comings and ineptitude which accompanied the British Army's involvement in the Norwegian Campaign during the spring of 1940.

== Overview ==
In the spring of 1940 Britain decided to send troops to Northern Norway and Lindsay, with his experience of organising Polar expeditions, was an obvious choice to help advise on the particular problems the climate and terrain could bring to military operations.

However he became deeply critical of the poorly organised and ill-prepared operation in Norway to the extent that he feared that Britain would lose the war unless important lessons were learned following the debacle. Lindsay was one of the first soldiers to reach London following the evacuation from Norway, and presented his candid account of the operation to members of His Majesty's Opposition such as Clement Attlee and Herbert Morrison. In the report Lindsay recalled an operation riven with the utmost incompetence, which he contended went to the very top of the government. The gravity of the report was not lost on Lindsay who is quoted as being:

“aware that for an officer to write as I have written is against the regulations, but I consider that the truth should be made known in the public interest and not buried.”

— Captain Martin Lindsay, May 1940.

The evidence presented by Lindsay was used by Attlee in order to bring about a vote of censure against the leadership of the then Prime Minister Neville Chamberlain, which ultimately led to Chamberlain's resignation, the appointment of Winston Churchill and the creation of a coalition government.
