= Hobs Moat =

Ruined castle in Solihull, England

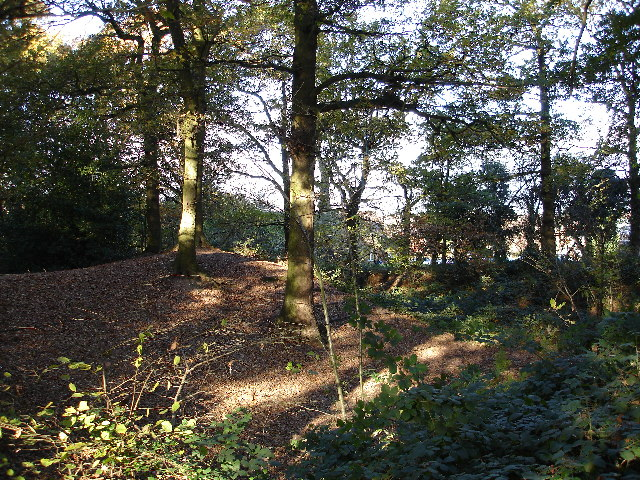
Edge of the Moat at Hobs Moat Ancient Monument

Hobs Moat is a ruined 12th-century castle located to the west of Hobs Moat Road and north of Castle Lane in Olton in Solihull, England. The site is designated a scheduled ancient monument, however, only the earthworks remain above the ground level.

== Etymology ==
The prevailing theory is that the name 'Hobs Moat' is a corruption of 'Odingsells' Moat', so called because the founders of the castle were the de Odingsells, anciently written as 'Hoginsells', family.

Other suggestions have been put forward, such as that after the ruin of the castle, the site was a location for the practice of pannage – where pigs ('hogs' corrupted to 'hobs') could be sent to eat acorns. Another, more fanciful theory, suggests that prior to the construction of the castle, the site was locally believed to be home to Hobs – creatures of English folklore derived from the Cofgodas or "cove-gods" of Anglo-Saxon paganism.

== History ==
The castle is believed to have been constructed as the fortified manor house of Ulverli (today in Solihull) by the de Ogdinsells family. The family were believed to be of Flemish origin, with their heir marrying the grand-daughter and heir of Ralph de Limesy, thereby inheriting the Lordship of the Manor of Ulverli.

It is not exactly clear when the castle fell into ruin, but it is believed to have happened in the 14th century. Antiquary Sir William Dugdale would visit the site in 1656, finding only "a large Moat", and was informed by the locals that the castle there had long since been removed. Following the subinfeudation of the manor of Ulverli into the manor of Solihull, the Odingsells had constructed a new purpose-built manor house closer to the new Solihull town centre, called Silhill Hall, at some point in the 13th century.

== Structure ==
The site has been subject to numerous archaeological inspections, which have uncovered evidence for a collapsed sandstone wall, and suggested a late-13th-century date for its construction – pottery has been found at the site further affirming this date. The remains of the wall had been overlain by the base of a later structure.

Excavation, geophysical and field survey were carried out at Hob's moat between 1985 and 1986 and found a number of medieval buildings. In addition a late medieval/early post medieval shed-like structure was found indicative that the site had at one time been used for agriculture after the castle was ruined, however a later survey carried out in October 1997 by RCHME concluded that it was probably a hunting lodge.

The castle would have stood on the remaining large rectangular earthwork platform, which is encased by a rampart, a wide ditch and a counterscarp bank. The moat was spring-fed, with the northern boundary of the moat on a spring line.

Immediately alongside the north side of Hob's Moat are the earthwork remains of a hollow way which is medieval in origin and is thought to have run westwards to connect Hob's Moat with Castle Lane.

== See also ==
- Maxstoke Castle
- Kenilworth Castle
- Baddesley Clinton
- Weoley Castle
