= John Taylor (Solihull MP) =

British politician (1941–2017)

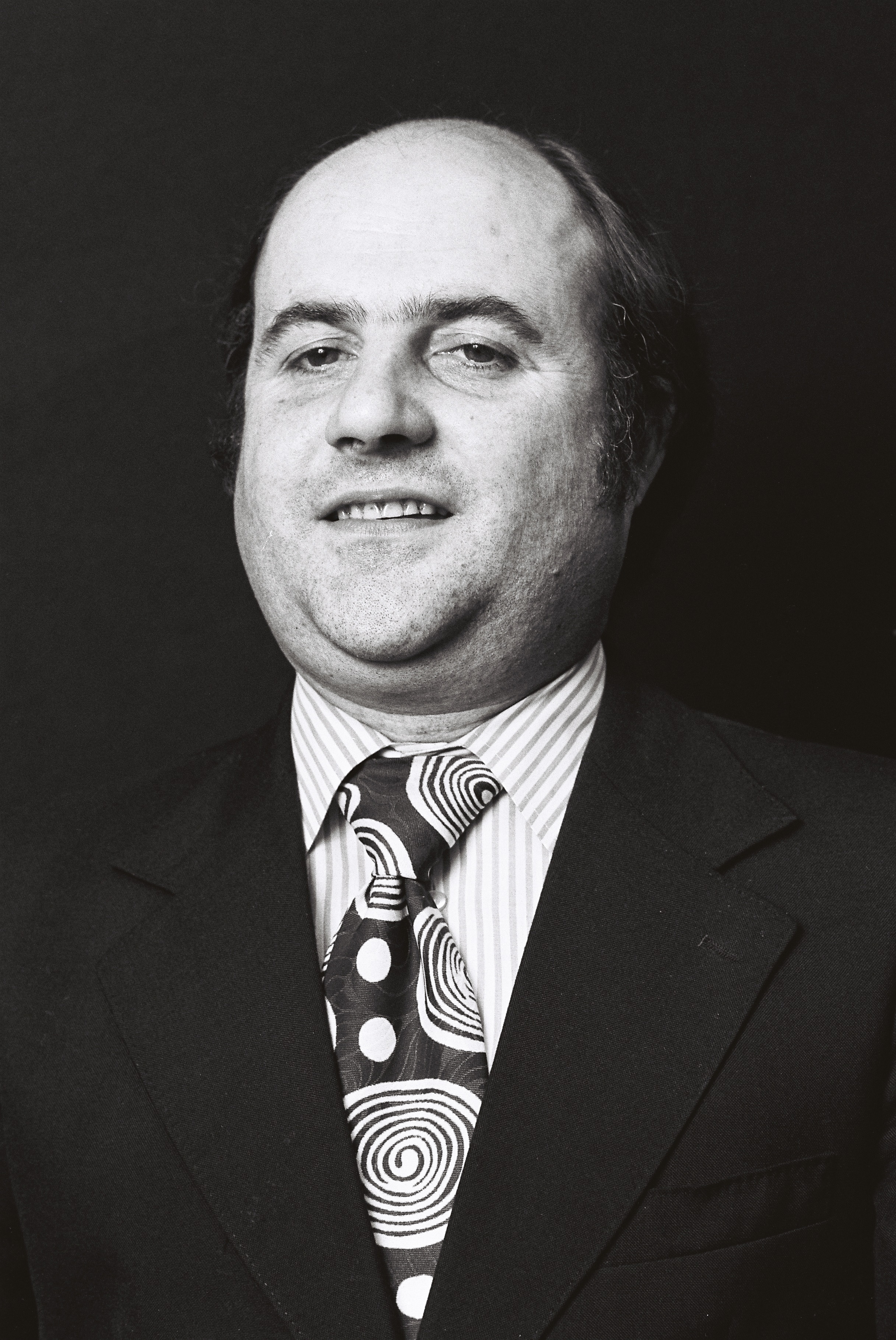
- Taylor as an MEP

Parliamentary Under-Secretary of State for Trade and Industry
- In office 29 November 1995 – 1 May 1997
- Prime Minister: John Major
- Preceded by: Jonathan Evans
- Succeeded by: Nigel Griffiths

Vice-Chamberlain of the Household
- In office 28 November 1990 – 15 April 1992
- Prime Minister: John Major
- Preceded by: David Lightbown
- Succeeded by: Sydney Chapman

Lord Commissioner of the Treasury
- In office 26 July 1989 – 28 November 1990
- Prime Minister: Margaret Thatcher
- Preceded by: David Maclean
- Succeeded by: Tim Wood (1992)

Member of Parliament for Solihull
- In office 9 June 1983 – 11 April 2005
- Preceded by: Percy Grieve
- Succeeded by: Lorely Burt

Personal details
- Born: John Mark Taylor; 19 August 1941 Hampton in Arden, Warwickshire, England
- Died: 28 May 2017 (aged 75) Solihull, England
- Party: Conservative
- Education: Bromsgrove School
- Alma mater: College of Law
- Occupation: Solicitor; MP

John Mark Taylor (19 August 1941 – 28 May 2017) was a British solicitor and Conservative politician who served as Member of Parliament (MP) for Solihull from 1983 to 2005, when he lost his seat to Lorely Burt of the Liberal Democrats by a margin of 279 votes in the 2005 general election. He had previously been a Member of the European Parliament (MEP) and leader of West Midlands County Council. He was first elected to the House of Commons in 1983, and served as a junior minister under John Major.

== Early life ==
He went to the independent Bromsgrove School and the College of Law. He was a senior partner in John Taylor & Co. solicitors.

He began his career in the Solihull County Borough Council in 1971, then went on to the West Midlands Metropolitan County Council in 1973. He became Leader of the Opposition in 1975, Leader of the Council in 1977 and deputy chairman of the Association of Metropolitan Authorities in 1978.

== Parliamentary career ==
He contested Dudley East in February and October 1974.

Taylor was elected to the European Parliament for Midlands East in 1979, and served as the Conservatives' European Spokesman on the Community Budget from 1979 to 1981. He was deputy chairman of the Conservative Group in the European Parliament from 1981 to 1982.

Elected as MP for Solihull in 1983, he held the seat for the subsequent four general elections. He became secretary of the Conservative Back Bench Committee on European Affairs in 1983, member of the Select Committee on the Environment from 1983 to 1987, as well as vice chairman of the Conservative Back Bench Committee on Sport.

He served as an assistant government whip from 1988 to 1989, a Lord Commissioner of Her Majesty's Treasury from 1989 to 1990 and Vice-Chamberlain of Her Majesty's Household from 1990 to 1992.

From 1992 to 1995, Taylor was Parliamentary Secretary at the Lord Chancellor's Department, a Parliamentary Under-Secretary of State at the Department of Trade and Industry from 1995 to 1997, and then a delegate Member of the Council of Europe and vice-chairman of the Conservative Parliamentary Committees on Trade and Industry and Legal Affairs. He served in the Conservative Whips Office from 1997 to 1999, and became a Shadow Minister for Northern Ireland in 1999.

He narrowly lost his Solihull seat to the Liberal Democrat Lorely Burt in a surprise result in the May 2005 general election.

== Death ==
Taylor died in Solihull on 28 May 2017 at the age of 75.

Parliament of the United Kingdom
Preceded by Percy Grieve	Member of Parliament for Solihull; 1983–2005	Succeeded by Lorely Burt
Political offices
Preceded by David Lightbown	Vice-Chamberlain of the Household; 1990–1992	Succeeded by Sydney Chapman
