= Percy Grieve =

British politician (1915–1998)

William Percival Grieve, QC (25 March 1915 – 22 August 1998) was a British Conservative Party politician.

Grieve was educated at Trinity Hall, Cambridge. He became a barrister, and was called to the bar at Middle Temple in 1938, and a Queen's Counsel in 1962. He was assistant recorder of Leicester 1956-65 and became recorder of Northampton in 1965 and Deputy Chairman of Lincoln (Holland) Quarter Sessions in 1962.

Grieve contested the 1962 Lincoln by-election, where he lost heavily to Labour's Dick Taverne. At the 1964 general election, he was returned as Member of Parliament (MP) for Solihull, and re-elected until his retirement from Parliament at the 1983 general election. He briefly employed the slogan "Grieve for Solihull".

He married, in 1949, Evelyn Raymonde Louise (d. 1991), daughter of Commandant Hubert Mijouain, of Paris, and maternal granddaughter of Sir George Roberts, 1st and last baronet. Their son Dominic Grieve, KC, PC, was elected MP for Beaconsfield at the 1997 general election, and became Attorney General for England and Wales in May 2010.

Parliament of the United Kingdom
Preceded by Sir Martin Lindsay	Member of Parliament for Solihull; 1964–1983	Succeeded by John M. Taylor
