= Lorely Burt =

British politician (born 1954)

The Right Honourable The Baroness Burt of Solihull
- Official portrait, 2019

Liberal Democrat Spokesperson for Women and Equalities
- In office October 2016 – 21 August 2019
- Leader: Tim Farron; Vince Cable; Jo Swinson
- Preceded by: Baroness Hussein-Ece
- Succeeded by: Christine Jardine

Liberal Democrat Business, Energy and Industrial Strategy Spokesperson
- In office 29 July 2015 – October 2016
- Leader: Tim Farron
- Preceded by: Vince Cable
- Succeeded by: Don Foster, Baron Foster of Bath

Liberal Democrat Northern Ireland Spokesperson
- In office 9 January 2015 – 16 July 2015
- Leader: Nick Clegg
- Preceded by: Alistair Carmichael (2010)
- Succeeded by: Lord Alderdice

Assistant Government Whip
- In office 4 November 2014 – 8 May 2015
- Preceded by: Jenny Willott

Parliamentary Private Secretary to the Chief Secretary to the Treasury
- In office 11 September 2012 – 4 November 2014
- Prime Minister: David Cameron
- Leader: Nick Clegg
- Preceded by: Gordon Birtwistle

Chair of the Liberal Democrat Parliamentary Party
- In office 25 October 2007 – 1 November 2012
- Leader: Nick Clegg
- Preceded by: Paul Holmes
- Succeeded by: Paul Burstow

Member of the House of Lords
- Lord Temporal
- Life peerage 9 October 2015 – 7 May 2026

Member of Parliament for Solihull
- In office 5 May 2005 – 30 March 2015
- Preceded by: John Taylor
- Succeeded by: Julian Knight

Personal details
- Born: 10 September 1954 (age 72) Sedgley, Staffordshire, England
- Party: Liberal Democrats
- Spouse: Richard Burt
- Children: 2
- Education: University College, Swansea
- Website: www.lorelyburt.org.uk

Lorely Jane Burt, Baroness Burt of Solihull (born 10 September 1954), is a British politician, who was the Liberal Democrat Member of Parliament for Solihull from 2005 to 2015. She received a life peerage in the 2015 Dissolution Honours. She is a patron of Humanists UK.

== Early life ==
Burt attended High Arcal Grammar School, Dudley (1966–1971) and Dudley Technical College (A-levels 1971–1973) before going to University College, Swansea, where she attained a BSc degree in economics. She later received an MBA degree from The Open University.

== Employment before Parliament ==
After graduating in economics, Burt began her career in the Prison Service as an Assistant Governor at HM Prison Holloway before working for several national companies in personnel and training. She later set up a training company and worked as a director in the marketing and financial services sector. She started part-time consultancy work when she became the prospective Liberal Democrat candidate for Solihull.

== Political career ==
Burt's political career began on Dudley Metropolitan Borough Council, where she served from 1998 to 2003. She stood for election in Dudley South at the 2001 general election. She also stood for the West Midlands region at the 2004 European Parliament election.

=== Member of Parliament ===
In the run up to the 2005 general election, Burt campaigned on various local issues affecting Solihull, and succeeded in overturning incumbent John Taylor's 9,407 majority to a 279 majority in her favour.

Following her election, Burt became a Liberal Democrat Spokesperson on Northern Ireland, an Opposition Whip, and served on the Treasury Select Committee. Following the election of Sir Menzies Campbell to the leadership of the party in 2006, Burt became the Liberal Democrat Spokesperson on Small Business and Women and Equality. In 2007 she moved to become the Spokesperson for Business, Enterprise and Regulatory Reform.

In October 2007, she was elected as the party's first female Chair of the Liberal Democrats' Parliamentary Party, defeating John Thurso and Andrew George in a poll of MPs.

In the 2010 general election, boundary changes had made her seat notionally Conservative. She held Solihull by 175 votes over her Conservative opponent Maggie Throup.

In 2013 Burt was appointed Parliamentary Private Secretary to Danny Alexander, the Chief Secretary to the Treasury. Upon taking this new role she resigned from her positions as BIS Co-chair and Chair of the Parliamentary Party.

In April 2014 she was appointed the government's Ambassador for Women in Enterprise.

In November 2014 Burt was appointed to be an Assistant Government Whip.

She lost her seat to the Conservative Julian Knight in the 2015 general election. Burt and her supporters were criticised for pushing away reporters as she left her election count following her defeat.

She was announced as a new peer in the 2015 Dissolution Honours and on the afternoon of 9 October she was created Baroness Burt of Solihull, of Solihull in the County of West Midlands.

== Campaigns ==
Burt has campaigned on a number of issues both locally and nationally. Locally, she has campaigned to prevent Shirley parkland from being developed, to save Solihull's NHS Walk-In Centre, to save Shirley Library from closure and for a better ambulance service.

== Personal life ==
Burt is married to Richard, who himself has been a Liberal Democrat parliamentary candidate several times, and has a daughter and a stepson.

She is an honorary associate of the National Secular Society and a Vice Chair of the All-Party Parliamentary Humanist Group.

== See also ==
- Liberal Democrat Frontbench Team

Parliament of the United Kingdom
Preceded by John Taylor	Member of Parliament for Solihull; 2005–2015	Succeeded by Julian Knight
