= Solihull (constituency) =

Parliamentary constituency in the United Kingdom, 1945-2024

- Former borough constituency for the House of Commons
- 2010–2024 boundary of Solihull in West Midlands

- Location of West Midlands within England
- County: West Midlands
- Electorate: 77,354 (December 2010)
- Major settlements: Solihull

1945–2024
- Seats: One
- Created from: Tamworth
- Replaced by: Solihull West and Shirley

Solihull was a constituency in West Midlands represented in the House of Commons of the UK Parliament.

Further to the completion of the 2023 Periodic Review of Westminster constituencies, the seat was abolished and its area was split. The bulk of the constituency was reformed as Solihull West and Shirley, first contested at the 2024 general election. Other parts of the constituency moved into the new seat of Meriden and Solihull East.

== Constituency profile ==
The Solihull area is home to some of the West Midlands's more affluent residents and includes a high proportion of Birmingham workers and the managerial classes in manufacturing, retail, industry and the public sector. There are smaller villages and undeveloped green belt areas in its peripheral countryside, though the seat was primarily suburban and middle-class, with low levels of deprivation throughout. Workless claimants stood at only 2% of the population in November 2012, below every regional average in the UK. In the study of that date, only three of the 59 West Midlands seats had a lower proportion of registered jobseekers.

Following boundary changes, the northernmost tip of the seat contained the point in England furthest from the coast in any direction.

== Boundaries ==
Map of boundaries 1983–2024

The constituency was one of two covering the Metropolitan Borough of Solihull. It covered the town of Solihull itself, as well as Shirley and Olton. It is a largely well-off, residential area, in the south-east of the West Midlands conurbation.

1945–1950: The part of the County Borough of Birmingham in the present Tamworth constituency, and the urban district of Solihull.

1950–1974: The Urban District of Solihull.

1974–1983: The County Borough of Solihull.

1983–2024: The Metropolitan Borough of Solihull wards of Elmdon, Lyndon, Olton, St Alphege, Shirley East, Shirley South, Shirley West, and Silhill.

== History ==
Conservative candidates won the seat from its outset in 1945 until a loss in 2005, the seat meanwhile seeing boundary changes covered above. In the 2005 general election Solihull was won by the Liberal Democrats, with Lorely Burt beating the incumbent John Taylor by a majority of 279 votes. Burt won the seat again at the 2010 general election, this time by just 175 votes following two recounts.

The seat was represented by Julian Knight since 2015, who won the seat from Burt with a majority of 12,902. At the 2017 election, Knight increased his majority to just over 20,000, with a similar result in 2019, making Solihull a safe Conservative seat.

However, following allegations of serious sexual assault made to the Metropolitan Police against Knight in December 2022, Knight sat as an independent MP, having had the Conservative whip suspended.

== Members of Parliament ==
Tamworth prior to 1945

Election	Member	Party
1945	Sir Martin Lindsay	Conservative
1964	Percy Grieve	Conservative
1983	John Taylor	Conservative
2005	Lorely Burt	Liberal Democrats
2015	Julian Knight	Conservative
2022	Julian Knight	Independent
2024	Constituency abolished	

== Election results 1945–2024 ==
Results of UK House of Commons seat Solihull, created in 1945, since 2005.

=== Election in the 1940s ===
General election 1945: Solihull
Party	Candidate	Votes	%	±%
Conservative	Sir Martin Lindsay	26,696	55.22	
Labour	Roy Jenkins	21,647	44.78	
Majority		5,049	10.44	
Turnout		48,343	71.79	
Conservative win (new seat)				

=== Elections in the 1950s ===
General election 1950: Solihull
Party	Candidate	Votes	%	±%
Conservative	Martin Lindsay	25,758	63.28	
Labour	W.N. Camp	11,741	28.84	
Liberal	Ada M Hayes	3,206	7.88	New
Majority		14,017	34.44	
Turnout		40,705	86.92	
Conservative hold		Swing		

General election 1951: Solihull
Party	Candidate	Votes	%	±%
Conservative	Martin Lindsay	27,871	70.35	
Labour	John Johnson	11,747	29.65	
Majority		16,124	40.70	
Turnout		39,618	83.18	
Conservative hold		Swing		

General election 1955: Solihull
Party	Candidate	Votes	%	±%
Conservative	Martin Lindsay	29,323	72.18	
Labour	Marion Large	11,300	27.82	
Majority		18,023	44.36	
Turnout		40,623	78.28	
Conservative hold		Swing		

General election 1959: Solihull
Party	Candidate	Votes	%	±%
Conservative	Martin Lindsay	35,862	73.88	
Labour	Eric J Bowen	12,682	26.12	
Majority		23,180	47.76	
Turnout		48,544	80.60	
Conservative hold		Swing		

=== Elections in the 1960s ===
General election 1964: Solihull
Party	Candidate	Votes	%	±%
Conservative	Percy Grieve	32,355	59.45	
Labour	Thomas WK Scott	11,969	21.99	
Liberal	Lionel Farell	10,097	18.55	New
Majority		20,386	37.46	
Turnout		54,421	80.46	
Conservative hold		Swing		

General election 1966: Solihull
Party	Candidate	Votes	%	±%
Conservative	Percy Grieve	34,008	65.69	
Labour	D.A. Forwood	17,760	34.31	
Majority		16,248	31.38	
Turnout		51,768	74.80	
Conservative hold		Swing		

=== Elections in the 1970s ===
General election 1970: Solihull
Party	Candidate	Votes	%	±%
Conservative	Percy Grieve	37,756	64.29	
Labour	Douglas Gray	13,181	22.44	
Liberal	R. A. Davis	7,795	13.27	New
Majority		24,575	41.85	
Turnout		58,732	72.14	
Conservative hold		Swing		

General election February 1974: Solihull
Party	Candidate	Votes	%	±%
Conservative	Percy Grieve	35,049	54.47	
Liberal	J.A. Windmill	17,686	27.49	
Labour	D.A. Norman	11,608	18.04	
Majority		17,363	26.98	
Turnout		64,343	81.30	
Conservative hold		Swing		

General election October 1974: Solihull
Party	Candidate	Votes	%	±%
Conservative	Percy Grieve	31,707	52.67	
Liberal	J.A. Windmill	15,848	26.33	
Labour	Denis MacShane	12,640	21.00	
Majority		15,859	26.34	
Turnout		60,195	75.25	
Conservative hold		Swing		

General election 1979: Solihull
Party	Candidate	Votes	%	±%
Conservative	Percy Grieve	43,027	66.16	
Labour	David Hallam	10,820	16.64	
Liberal	Ian Gillett	10,214	15.70	
National Front	D. Stevenson	978	1.50	New
Majority		32,207	49.52	
Turnout		65,039	77.18	
Conservative hold		Swing		

=== Elections in the 1980s ===
General election 1983: Solihull
Party	Candidate	Votes	%	±%
Conservative	John Taylor	31,947	60.8	▼5.4
Liberal	Ian Gillett	14,553	27.7	▲12.0
Labour	I. Jamieson	6,075	11.6	▼5.0
Majority		17,394	33.1	▼16.4
Turnout		52,575	71.4	▼5.8
Conservative hold		Swing		

General election 1987: Solihull
Party	Candidate	Votes	%	±%
Conservative	John Taylor	35,844	61.1	▲0.3
Liberal	Geoff E. Gadie	14,058	24.0	▼3.7
Labour	Sue E. Knowles	8,791	15.0	▲3.4
Majority		21,786	37.1	▲4.0
Turnout		58,693	75.1	▲3.7
Conservative hold		Swing	▲2.0	

=== Elections in the 1990s ===
General election 1992: Solihull
Party	Candidate	Votes	%	±%
Conservative	John Taylor	38,385	60.8	▼0.3
Liberal Democrats	Michael J. Southcombe	13,239	21.0	▼2.9
Labour	Nicola Kutapan	10,544	16.7	▲1.7
Green	Clifford G. Hards	925	1.5	New
Majority		25,146	39.8	▲2.7
Turnout		63,093	81.6	▲6.5
Conservative hold		Swing	▲1.4	

General election 1997: Solihull
Party	Candidate	Votes	%	±%
Conservative	John Taylor	26,299	44.6	▼16.2
Liberal Democrats	Michael J. Southcombe	14,902	25.3	▲4.3
Labour	Rachel N. Harris	14,334	24.3	▲7.6
Referendum	Mike Nattrass	2,748	4.7	New
ProLife Alliance	Jim Caffery	623	1.1	New
Majority		11,397	19.3	▼20.5
Turnout		58,906	74.6	▼7.0
Conservative hold		Swing	▼10.3	

=== Elections in the 2000s ===
General election 2001: Solihull
Party	Candidate	Votes	%	±%
Conservative	John Taylor	21,935	45.4	▲0.8
Liberal Democrats	Jo Byron	12,528	26.0	▲0.7
Labour	Brendan O’Brien	12,373	25.6	▲1.3
UKIP	Andy Moore	1,061	2.2	New
ProLife Alliance	Mary Pyne	374	0.8	▼0.3
Majority		9,407	19.4	▲0.1
Turnout		48,271	63.3	▼11.3
Conservative hold		Swing		

General election 2005: Solihull
Party	Candidate	Votes	%	±%
Liberal Democrats	Lorely Burt	20,896	39.9	▲13.9
Conservative	John Taylor	20,617	39.4	▼6.0
Labour	Rory Vaughan	8,058	15.4	▼10.2
BNP	Diane Carr	1,752	3.3	New
UKIP	Andrew Moore	990	1.9	▼0.3
Majority		279	0.5	N/A
Turnout		52,313	63.1	▼0.2
Liberal Democrats gain from Conservative		Swing	▲10.0	

=== Elections in the 2010s ===
General election 2010: Solihull
Party	Candidate	Votes	%	±%
Liberal Democrats	Lorely Burt	23,635	42.9	▲3.5
Conservative	Maggie Throup	23,460	42.6	▲2.9
Labour	Sarah Merrill	4,891	8.9	▼6.7
BNP	Andrew Terry	1,624	2.9	▼0.5
UKIP	John Ison	1,200	2.2	▲0.3
Solihull and Meriden Residents' Association	Neill Watts	319	0.6	New
Majority		175	0.3	▼0.2
Turnout		55,129	71.9	▲4.5
Liberal Democrats gain from Conservative		Swing	▲0.3	

Although its predecessor seat was won by the Liberal Democrats in 2005, intervening boundary changes made the constituency notionally Conservative prior to the 2010 general election, and it is therefore listed as a gain rather than a hold.

General election 2015: Solihull
Party	Candidate	Votes	%	±%
Conservative	Julian Knight	26,956	49.2	▲6.6
Liberal Democrats	Lorely Burt	14,054	25.7	▼17.2
UKIP	Phil Henrick	6,361	11.6	▲9.4
Labour	Nigel Knowles	5,693	10.4	▲1.5
Green	Howard Allen	1,632	3.0	New
An Independence from Europe	Mike Nattrass	50	0.1	New
Democratic	Matthew Ward	33	0.1	New
Majority		12,902	23.5	N/A
Turnout		54,779	70.9	▼1.0
Conservative gain from Liberal Democrats		Swing	▲11.9	

General election 2017: Solihull
Party	Candidate	Votes	%	±%
Conservative	Julian Knight	32,985	58.1	▲8.9
Labour	Nigel Knowles	12,414	21.9	▲11.5
Liberal Democrats	Ade Adeyemo	8,901	15.7	▼10.0
UKIP	Andrew Garcarz	1,291	2.3	▼9.3
Green	Max McLoughlin	1,157	2.0	▼1.0
Majority		20,571	36.2	▲12.7
Turnout		56,748	73.4	▲2.5
Conservative hold		Swing	▼1.3	

General election 2019: Solihull
Party	Candidate	Votes	%	±%
Conservative	Julian Knight	32,309	58.4	▲0.3
Labour Co-op	Nick Stephens	11,036	19.9	▼2.0
Liberal Democrats	Ade Adeyemo	9,977	18.0	▲2.3
Green	Rosi Sexton	2,022	3.7	▲1.7
Majority		21,273	38.5	▲2.3
Turnout		55,344	70.3	▼3.1
Conservative hold		Swing	▲1.2	

== See also ==
- List of parliamentary constituencies in the West Midlands (county)
