= Julian Knight (politician) =

British politician

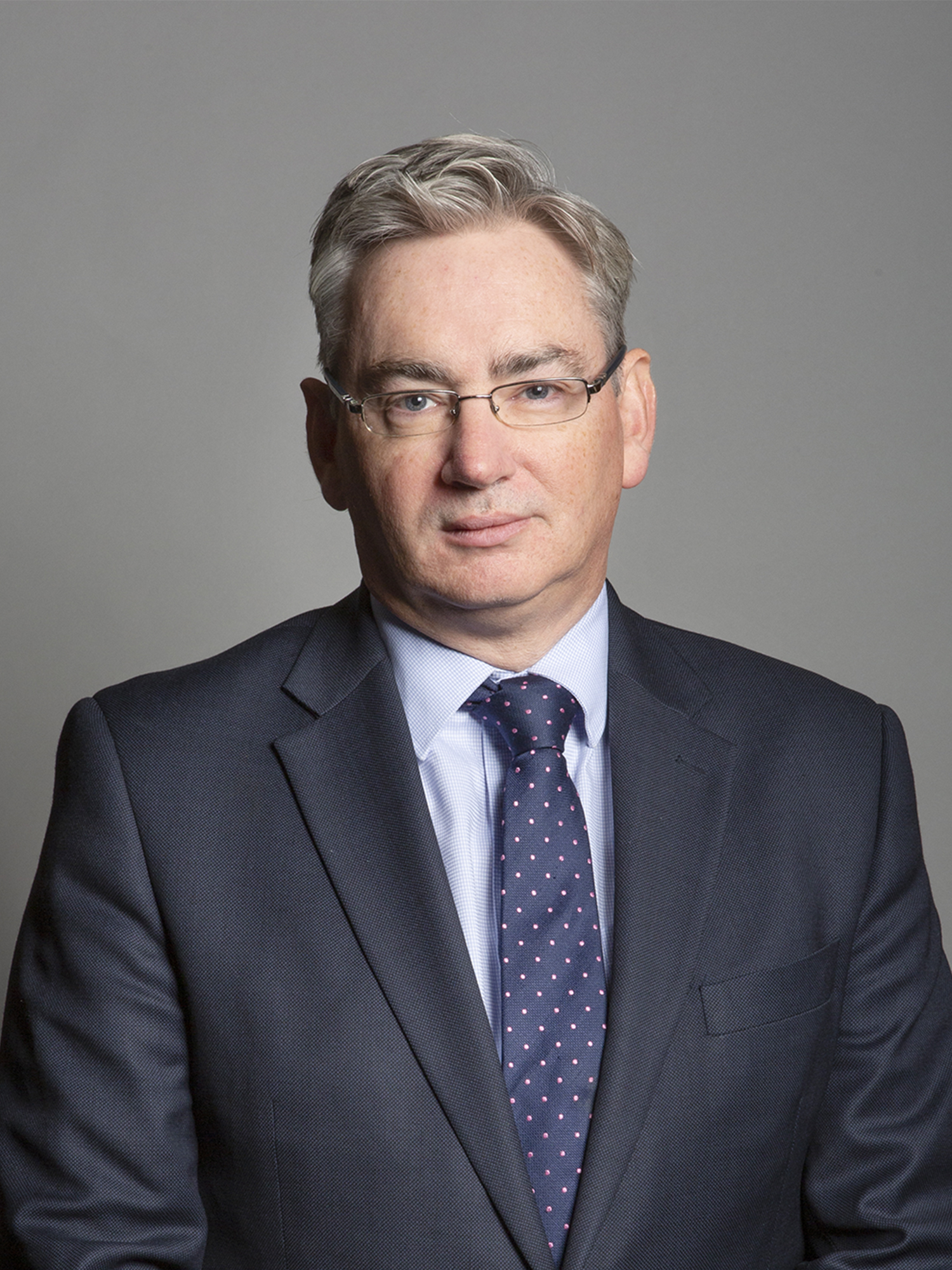
- Official portrait, 2019

Chair of the Digital, Culture, Media and Sport Committee
- In office 29 January 2020 – 25 April 2023 (Note: Damian Green was Acting Chair from 10 January 2023 to 31 March 2023 while Knight temporarily stood aside.)
- Preceded by: Damian Collins
- Succeeded by: Damian Green (acting)

Member of Parliament for Solihull
- In office 7 May 2015 – 30 May 2024
- Preceded by: Lorely Burt
- Succeeded by: Constituency abolished Neil Shastri-Hurst (as MP for Solihull West and Shirley)

Personal details
- Born: 5 January 1972 (age 54) Chester, Cheshire, England
- Party: Independent
- Other political affiliations: Conservative (until 7 December 2022)
- Spouse: Philippa Harrison
- Education: University of Hull
- Website: Official website

Julian Knight (born 5 January 1972) is a British politician, author and former journalist who served as the Member of Parliament (MP) for Solihull from 2015 to 2024. He is a member of the Conservative Party, but sat as an independent from December 2022 until the end of his term.

In the 2024 election, he stood as an independent candidate in Solihull West and Shirley, the newly created successor seat to his old Solihull constituency. He came last out of six candidates with 594 votes.

== Early life and career ==
Julian Knight was born on 5 January 1972 in Chester. He grew up in a single-parent family. He graduated with a degree in history from the University of Hull.

After university, Knight returned to Chester where he worked for a number of electrical retailers before moving to London to sell advertising for The Sun newspaper. He later worked for the BBC as personal finance and consumer affairs reporter for five years until 2007, working across television, radio and online. In 2007 he became the Money and Property Editor of The Independent on Sunday.

In April 2015, Knight was criticised by Danny Alexander, Chief Secretary to the Treasury, for a book he authored eleven years earlier on tax avoidance.

Knight has written books on a variety of subjects for the For Dummies series, including the Euro crisis, Retiring Wealthy and The Royal Wedding.

== Parliamentary career ==
In 2014, Knight was selected to be the Conservative prospective parliamentary candidate for Solihull. At the 2015 general election Knight was elected as MP for Solihull with 49.2% of the vote and a majority of 12,902, defeating the incumbent Liberal Democrat MP Lorely Burt.

Prior to the 2016 UK referendum on European Union membership, Knight stated he would vote to remain in the EU.

At the 2017 general election, Knight was re-elected as MP for Solihull with an increased vote share of 58.1% and an increased majority of 20,571.

In January 2018, Knight was appointed Parliamentary Private Secretary at the Ministry of Justice. In September 2018 he moved to the Department for Work and Pensions before moving to HM Treasury in January 2019.

Knight also served as the Prime Ministerial Trade Envoy to Mongolia, where he formed part of a network of parliamentarians with the role of strengthening relations with foreign countries, and helping British businesses in accessing foreign markets. In April 2018, Knight made his first visit to the country as Trade Envoy. Knight made his final visit in September 2018, and left the post at a later date.

At the 2019 general election, Knight was again re-elected with an increased vote share of 58.4% and an increased majority of 21,273 votes.

In December 2021, Knight said there was a "real sense of palpable loss" over the death of six-year-old Arthur Labinjo-Hughes in Solihull. Knight said the sentences given to the killers of the boy were too lenient and he would be referring the sentences to the Attorney General's Office for review under the unduly lenient sentence scheme.

In July 2022, Knight supported Liz Truss in her campaign to become Conservative leader.

In April 2023, Knight announced that he would not seek re-election as an MP at the 2024 general election. He later chose to stand for the new Solihull West and Shirley constituency as an independent candidate. He finished in 6th place with 594 votes.

=== Committees ===
From July 2015 to April 2017, Knight served as a member of the Communities and Local Government Committee, during which time he co-sponsored the Government's Homelessness Reduction Act 2017.

He was a member of the Culture, Media, and Sport Select Committee, later the Digital, Culture, Media and Sport Select Committee from December 2016 until April 2023. In that role he made several interventions, including on the BBC gender pay row and against Facebook and digital company Cambridge Analytica during the committee's inquiry into 'fake news'. In January 2020, Knight was elected as Chair of the Digital, Culture, Media and Sport (DCSM) Select Committee. Knight replaced Damian Collins as chairman.

In April 2023, Knight resigned as Chair of the DCMS Select Committee as he was recusing himself from Parliament until a complaint made about him to the Metropolitan Police had been resolved.

== Police investigation ==
In December 2022, Knight had the Conservative Party whip suspended after the Metropolitan Police received a referral involving allegations of sexual assault. Knight criticised the manner in which the suspension was carried out. Essex Police investigated these allegations. The Metropolitan Police said that it had received a report of "allegations of sexual assault against unnamed victims" on 28 October 2022 and after a further referral on 7 December 2022 had started an investigation. Knight stated he was "entirely innocent of any wrongdoing whatsoever". Knight was never arrested or interviewed by the police and on 29 March 2023, he was cleared of any wrongdoing by the Metropolitan Police. However he was not reinstated to the parliamentary Conservative Party following "further complaints". The Metropolitan Police transferred the case to Essex Police. In February 2024, Essex Police announced that following an investigation, no further criminal action would take place.

== Post-parliamentary career ==
Following his defeat at the 2024 UK General Election, Knight became a company director for a World War One battlefields tour guide company.

== Personal life ==
Knight lives in Solihull. He is married to Philippa, a former nurse.

== Works ==
- Retiring Wealthy For Dummies (John Wiley & Sons, 2006) ISBN 978-0470026328
- Cricket for Dummies (John Wiley & Sons, 2006) ISBN 978-0470034545
- The British Citizenship Test For Dummies (John Wiley & Sons, 2007) ISBN 978-0470723395
- Wills, Probate and Inheritance Tax For Dummies (John Wiley & Sons, 2008) ISBN 978-0470756294
- British Politics For Dummies (John Wiley & Sons, 2010) ISBN 978-0470686379
- The Royal Wedding For Dummies (John Wiley & Sons, 2011) ISBN 978-1119970309

Parliament of the United Kingdom
Preceded by Lorely Burt	Member of Parliament for Solihull; 2015–2024	Constituency abolished
