= 1996 New Year Honours =

British royal recognitions

The New Year Honours 1996 were appointments by most of the sixteen Commonwealth realms of Queen Elizabeth II to various orders and honours to reward and highlight good works by citizens of those countries, and honorary ones to citizens of other countries. They were announced on 29–30 December 1995 to celebrate the year passed and mark the beginning of 1996 in the United Kingdom, New Zealand and the Cook Islands, The Bahamas, Grenada, Papua New Guinea, the Solomon Islands, Tuvalu, Saint Vincent and the Grenadines, Belize, and Antigua and Barbuda.

== United Kingdom ==
=== Life Peer ===
Barons

- Sir David Howe Gillmore, GCMG, former Head of Her Majesty's Diplomatic Service.
- Sir Robert Kilpatrick, CBE, lately President, General Medical Council.
- Dick Taverne, QC, President, PRIMA Europe Limited.

=== Privy Counsellor ===
- David Philip Heathcoat-Amory, MP, Member of Parliament for Wells and Her Majesty's Paymaster General.
- Michael Ancram, DL, MP, Member of Parliament for Devizes and Minister of State, Northern Ireland Office.
- Sir Marcus Fox, MBE, MP, Member of Parliament for Shipley and Chairman of the 1922 Committee.

=== Knight Bachelor ===
- Peter Leahy Bonfield, CBE, Chairman, ICL plc. For services to the Information Technology Industry.
- Christian John Storey Bonington, CBE. For services to Mountaineering.
- Professor David Craig Carter, Regius Professor of Clinical Surgery, University of Edinburgh, and Chairman, Scottish Liver Transplantation Unit, Royal Infirmary, Edinburgh. For services to Medicine.
- Professor Cyril Chantler, Children Nationwide Medical Research Fund, Professor of Paediatric Nephrology, United Medical and Dental Schools, Guys and St Thomas' Hospitals. For services to Medicine.
- Charles Noel Davies, lately Chief Executive, VSEL Ltd. For services to the Defence Industry.
- Professor Graeme John Davies. For services to the Higher Education Funding Council, England.
- Ian Leonard Dixon, CBE, Chairman, Willmott Dixon Ltd. For services to the Construction Industry.
- Michael Gilbert Heron. For services to Vocation Education and Training.
- Colin Frederick Newton Hope, Chairman and Chief Executive, T&N plc. For services to the Motor Manufacturing Industry.
- Professor John Harold Horlock, FRS, Treasurer and Vice President, the Royal Society. For services to Science, Engineering and to Education.
- Francis Roger Hurn, Chairman and Chief Executive, Smiths Industries plc. For services to the Engineering Industry.
- Paul Rupert Judge. For political and public service.
- Harold Stanley Kalms, Executive Chairman, Dixons Group plc. For services to the Electrical Retailing Industry.
- Graham Kirkham. For charitable services to the Duke of Edinburgh's Award and to the Animal Health Trust.
- Professor Harold Walter Kroto, FRS, Royal Society Research Professor, University of Sussex. For services to Chemistry.
- Andrew McLeod Brooks Large, Chairman, Securities and Investments Board. For services to Financial Regulation.
- James Theodore Lester, MP, Member of Parliament for Broxtowe. For political service.
- Professor Donald Iain MacKay, Chairman, Scottish Enterprise. For services to Industry and to Public Life in Scotland.
- Cameron Anthony Mackintosh, Chairman, Cameron Mackintosh Ltd. For services to the Musical Theatre.
- Professor Robert McCredie May, FRS, Chief Scientific Adviser, and lately Royal Society Research Professor, University of Oxford and Imperial College, London. For services to Science.
- Malcolm Kenneth McIntosh, Chief of Defence Procurement, Ministry of Defence.
- Trefor Alfred Morris, CBE, QPM, Her Majesty's Chief Inspector of Constabulary. For services to the Police.
- Leslie Sharp, QPM, Chief Constable, Strathclyde Police. For services to the Police.
- Colin Ryley Shepherd, MP, Member of Parliament for Hereford. For political service.
- Maurice Adrian Shinwell. For political service.
- William Michael Hardy Spicer, MP, Member of Parliament for South Worcestershire. For political service.
- Jocelyn Edward Greville Stevens, CVO, Chairman, English Heritage. For services to Conservation.
- Professor Edward Anthony Wrigley, Master, Corpus Christi College, Cambridge. For services to Historical Demography.
- Bernard Philip Zissman. For political and public service.

Diplomatic Service and Overseas List

- Alister Arthur Kneller, Gibraltar, lately Chief Justice, Gibraltar.

=== Order of the Bath ===
==== Knight Grand Cross of the Order of the Bath (GCB) ====
Military Division

- General Sir John Finlay Willasey Wilsey, KCB, CBE, ADC (Gen.) (461522), late The Devonshire and Dorset Regiment.
- Air Chief Marshal Sir Michael Alcock, KBE, CB, Royal Air Force.

Civil Division

- Sir Peter Lewis Gregson, KCB, Permanent Secretary, Department of Trade and Industry.

==== Dame Commander of the Order of the Bath (DCB) ====
Civil Division

- Stella Rimington, Director General, The Security Service.

==== Knight Commander of the Order of the Bath (KCB) ====
Military Division

- Lieutenant General Rupert Anthony Smith, DSO, OBE, QGM, (477836), late The Parachute Regiment.

Civil Division

- Professor Kenneth Charles Calman, Chief Medical Officer, Department of Health.

==== Companion of the Order of the Bath (CB) ====
Military Division

Royal Navy

- Rear Admiral Frederick Brian Goodson, OBE.
- Rear Admiral Roger Charles Lane-Nott.

Army

- Major General Anthony Hugh Boyle (468949), late Royal Corps of Signals.
- Major General David Leslie Burden, CBE, (476891), late Royal Army Ordnance Corps.
- Major General Anthony de Camborne Lowther Leask, CBE, (473996), late Scots Guards.

Royal Air Force

- Air Vice-Marshal Timothy Ivo Jenner.
- Air Vice-Marshal Peter Coulson Norriss, AFC.

Civil Division

- Roderick Stuart Allison, Chief Executive, Offshore Safety Division, Health and Safety Executive, Department of the Environment.
- David Michael Rigby Barlow, Grade 3, Northern Ireland Office.
- Charles Richard Cann, Grade 2, Ministry of Agriculture, Fisheries and Food.
- Peter Clapham, lately Chief Executive, National Physical Laboratory, Department of Trade and Industry.
- Thomas Nisbet Gallagher, Her Majesty's Senior Chief Inspector of Schools, Scottish Office.
- John Francis Howe, OBE, Grade 2, Ministry of Defence.
- Norman Barrie Hudson, Grade 3, Overseas Development Administration.
- Lewis Harry Hughes, Assistant Auditor General, National Audit Office.
- Peter Francis Arnold Knowles, Parliamentary Counsel, Parliamentary Counsel Office.
- Stephen Charles Laws, Parliamentary Counsel, Parliamentary Counsel Office.
- William Robert McKay, Clerk Assistant, House of Commons.
- John Michael Moss, Grade 3, Ministry of Defence.
- David Lindsay Corbett Peretz, Deputy Director, Her Majesty's Treasury.
- Terence Charles Platt, Grade 2, Home Office.
- John Frederick Shaw, Grade 2, Department of Health.
- David Homfray Slater, Chief Inspector, Her Majesty's Inspectorate of Pollution, Department of the Environment.
- Clive Fenemore Tucker, Grade 3, Department for Education and Employment.
- Eugenie Christine Turton, Grade 2, Cabinet Office (OPS).

=== Order of Saint Michael and Saint George ===
==== Dame Commander of the Order of St Michael and St George (DCMG) ====
Diplomatic Service and Overseas List

- Lilian Pauline Neville-Jones, CMG, Deputy Under-Secretary of State and Political Director, Foreign and Commonwealth Office.

==== Knight Commander of the Order of St Michael and St George (KCMG) ====
Diplomatic Service and Overseas List

- Peter John Goulden, CMG, UK Permanent Representative, North Atlantic Council, Brussels.

==== Companion of the Order of St Michael and St George (CMG) ====
- David Ronald William Bryer, Director of OXFAM. For charitable services.
- Professor Ernest Demetrios Hondros, lately Director, Petten Establishment, Commission of the European Community's Joint Research Centre. For services to Science.

Diplomatic Service and Overseas List

- Roger Bridgland Bone, HM Ambassador, Stockholm.
- Desmond Hugh Cecil, Counsellor, Foreign and Commonwealth Office.
- Alan Charlton, Counsellor, Foreign and Commonwealth Office.
- George Robert Acworth Conquest, OBE. For services to the study of international affairs.
- Richard John Dalton, HM Consul-General, Jerusalem.
- Christopher Owen Hum, HM Ambassador-designate, Warsaw.
- David Christopher Andrew Madden, British High Commissioner, Nicosia.
- Peter James Marshall, Chargé d'Affaires, Algiers.
- Peter Pooley, lately Acting Director-General (DG VIII), Commission of the European Union.
- Robert John Sawers, lately Counsellor, Foreign and Commonwealth Office.
- Anne Elizabeth Stoddart, Deputy Permanent UK Representative to the United Nations, Geneva.

=== Royal Victorian Order ===
==== Commander of the Royal Victorian Order (CVO) ====
- Adrian Francis Patrick Barnes, Remembrancer, The City of London.
- Herrick Cyril William Bunney, LVO, Organist and Master of Music, St. Giles' Cathedral, Edinburgh.
- Commander Hugh Douglas Younger Faulkner, LVO, Secretary, The Royal Warrant Holders' Association.
- Marcus de Laune Faunce, OBE, AM, Honorary personal physician to the Governor-General of Australia.
- John Patrick Kyle, LVO, lately Clerk Accountant to Queen Elizabeth The Queen Mother.
- Brigadier Thomas Longland, OBE, Head of the World War II Commemoration Team.
- Delia Mary, Lady Millar. For services to the Royal Collection.
- Group Captain Godfrey Hugh Rolfe, CBE, lately Her Majesty's Deputy Air Equerry.

==== Lieutenant of the Royal Victorian Order (LVO) ====
- Sarah Rose, Viscountess Campden, Lady in Waiting to The Princess of Wales.
- Jennifer Mary Coulson, MVO, Chief Clerk, Private Secretary's Office, Buckingham Palace.
- Captain Jeremy Chilton Dreyer, lately Assistant Clerk of the Course, Ascot Racecourse.
- Anthony Charles Everett, OBE, lately Deputy Chief Executive of The Prince's Youth Business Trust.
- Philip Langton Forwood, lately Financial Adviser, Duchy of Lancaster.
- Gerald Stanley Harman, MVO, lately Head of Administration, Duchy of Lancaster.
- Michael Edward Kilby Hewlett, Managing Director, Royal Collection Enterprises Limited.
- Police Superintendent George John Kirchin, MVO, Royalty and Diplomatic Protection Department, Metropolitan Police.
- Christopher Hamilton Lloyd, Surveyor of The Queen's Pictures.
- Helen Joanna Page, Lady in Waiting to The Duchess of Gloucester.

==== Member of the Royal Victorian Order (MVO) ====
- Ashley Brett Bonner, lately Director of The Queen's Anniversary Prizes Office.
- Beryl Court, Clerk to the Lieutenancy, Berkshire.
- Police Inspector Simon David Cousins, Royalty and Diplomatic Protection Department, Metropolitan Police.
- Kenneth Spencer Fleetwood, Design Director, Hardy Amies Limited.
- Warrant Officer Cook Lawrence Marsh, RVM, HM Yacht Britannia.
- Susan Marilyn Martin, Property Services Administrator, Duchy of Cornwall.
- Geraldine Miriam May, Protocol Officer, Nova Scotia.
- Robert Guy Mitchell, Management Accountant, Duchy of Cornwall.
- Sergeant Bruce Michael Peardon, BEM, lately Royalty and Diplomatic Protection Department, Metropolitan Police.
- Lieutenant Commander Andrew Raggett, 32 (The Royal) Squadron.
- Gerald Twiss, Head Clerk, Crewe Survey Estate Office, Duchy of Lancaster.
- Police Inspector David Edward Voller, Royalty and Diplomatic Protection Department, Metropolitan Police.
- James Seath Wilkie Westwood, Accountant, Balmoral Estates.

==== Medal of the Royal Victorian Order (RVM) ====
In Silver

- John Brian Bycroft, Relief Gatekeeper, Shaw Farm Gate, Windsor.
- David Cartledge, Stallion Man, The Royal Studs, Sandringham.
- Charge Chief Marine Engineering Artificer (Electrical) Patrick William Clifford, lately HM Yacht Britannia.
- Leading Seaman (Sea) Kevin Nigel Cottingham, HM Yacht Britannia.
- Colin Keen, Standman, Silver Ring, Ascot Racecourse.
- Eric Ottewill, Gatekeeper, Park Street Gate, Windsor.
- Acting Petty Officer Marine Engineering Mechanic (Mechanical) John Patterson, HM Yacht Britannia.
- Raymond David Raeburn, lately Superintendent of Works, The Palace of Holyroodhouse.
- Police Constable Barry Ward, Royalty and Diplomatic Protection Department, Metropolitan Police.
- Colin Lawrence Wright, Woodman, The Crown Estate, Windsor.

Bar to the RVM in Silver

- James Leslie Pollard, RVM, Foreman/Cabinet Maker, The Palace of Holyroodhouse.
- Michael Christopher Martin Sealey, RVM, Chef to Queen Elizabeth The Queen Mother.
- William John Stephenson Tallon, RVM, Steward to Queen Elizabeth The Queen Mother.
- Alexander Webster, RVM, Head Gardener, The Castle of Mey.

=== Order of the Companions of Honour (CH) ===
- Sir David Frederick Attenborough, CVO, CBE, Broadcaster and Naturalist. For services to Nature Broadcasting.
- Sir William Richard Shaboe Doll, OBE, FRS. For services to Epidemiology.
- The Right Honourable Douglas Richard Hurd, CBE, MP, Member of Parliament for Witney and Secretary of State for Foreign and Commonwealth Affairs 1989–1995. For political service.
- Most Reverend Derek John Harford Worlock, lately Roman Catholic Archbishop of Liverpool. For services to the Roman Catholic Church and to the community in Liverpool.

=== Order of the British Empire ===
==== Dame Commander of the Order of the British Empire (DBE) ====
Civil Division

- Davina Marcia, Lady Darcy De Knayth. For political and public service.
- Jane Beverley Drew, (Mrs. Fry) CBE. For services to Architecture.
- Rennie Fritchie, Chairman, South and West Regional Health Authority. For services to Health Care.
- Antoinette Sibley, (Mrs. Corbett) CBE, President, Royal Academy of Dancing. For services to Ballet.

==== Knight Commander of the Order of the British Empire (KBE) ====
Military Division

- Vice Admiral Charles Christopher Morgan.

Civil Division

- The Right Honourable James Henry Molyneaux, MP, Member of Parliament for Lagan Valley and Leader of the Ulster Unionist Party 1979–95. For political service.

==== Commander of the Order of the British Empire (CBE) ====
Military Division

Royal Navy

- Captain Rodney de Forges Browne.
- Captain Hugh Wilson Rickard, ADC.

Army

- Colonel Tresham Dames Gregg (485734), late The Light Dragoons.
- Colonel Charles Michael Lake (480349), late Royal Corps of Transport.
- Colonel Christopher David Mackenzie-Beevor, OBE, (491496), late The Queen's Dragoon Guards.

Royal Air Force

- Air Commodore Michael Paul Crotty, (Retired).
- Group Captain Geoffrey Dennis Simpson, AFC.
- Group Captain Brian Arthur Wright, OBE, AFC, (Retired).

Civil Division

- Professor Margaret Forbes Alexander, lately Head, Department of Nursing and Community Health, Glasgow Caledonian University. For services to Health Care.
- Roger Hugh Allen, Assistant Director, Her Majesty's Board of Inland Revenue.
- John Norman Anderson, Chairman, Sunderland City Training and Enterprise Council. For services to Training.
- Professor Struther Arnott, Principal, St Andrews University. For services to Higher Education.
- Edward John Billington, RD, Chairman, Edward Billington and Son Ltd. For services to Industry in Merseyside.
- Clive Bradley, Chief Executive, the Publishers Association. For services to Publishing.
- Rodney George Brooke, Secretary, Association of Metropolitan Authorities. For services to Local Government.
- Peter Wilfred Henry Brown, Secretary and Accounting Officer, the British Academy. For services to the British Academy.
- James Bruxner, lately Chairman, Scotch Whisky Association. For services to the Scotch Whisky Industry.
- Professor Charles Anthony Butterworth, Professor of Community Nursing, University of Manchester. For services to Nursing.
- Patrick Joseph Caulfield, Artist. For services to Art.
- Peter Frederick Chalke. For political and public service.
- Professor Forrester Cockburn, Samson Gemmell Professor of Child Health, University of Glasgow. For services to Medicine.
- Andrew Cook, Chairman, William Cook plc. For services to the Steel Castings Industry.
- John Richard Corrin, Chief Executive, Allied Textile Companies plc. For services to the Textile Industry.
- John Peter Coverdale, OBE, lately Chairman, MAFF's North Eastern Regional Panel. For services to Agriculture.
- David Garfield Davies, General Secretary, Union of Shop, Distributive and Allied Workers. For services to Industrial Relations.
- Professor John Michael Newsom-Davis, FRS, Professor of Clinical Neurology, University of Oxford. For services to Medicine.
- Roy Dietz, Director (Bioscience & Innovation), Laboratory of the Government Chemist, Department of Trade and Industry.
- Kenneth Herbert Morley Dixon, DL, Chairman of Council, University of York. For services to Higher Education.
- Heather Le Mercier Du Quesnay, Director of Education, Hertfordshire County Council. For services to Education.
- John Anthony East, OBE. For services to Tourism.
- Diana Ann Mary Ernaelsteen, Grade 5, Department for Education and Employment.
- Terence Farrell, OBE. For services to Architecture.
- Brigadier Anne Field, CB. For services to the Women's Royal Army Corps Association.
- Caroline Joyce Fryd, MBE. For services to the Royal Society for Mentally Handicapped Children and Adults.
- Professor Alexander McIntosh Geddes, Professor of Infectious Diseases, University of Birmingham. For services to Medicine.
- Robin John Geldard, President, Associated British Chambers of Commerce. For services to Business in Wales.
- William Richard Philip George. For services to Local Government in Wales.
- Archibald Gillespie, Director of Finance, Strathclyde Regional Council. For services to Local Government.
- Daniel George Goyder, Deputy Chairman, Monopolies and Mergers Commission. For services to Industry.
- Peter Anthony Gribben, QFSM, lately County Fire Officer and Chief Executive, Greater Manchester Fire and Civil Defence Authority. For services to the Fire Service.
- Richard Victor Grobler, Deputy Secretary of Commissions, Lord Chancellor's Department.
- Professor Harold Charles Arthur Hankins, lately Principal and Vice-Chancellor, University of Manchester Institute of Science and Technology. For services to Education.
- Brian John Taylor Hanson, Registrar and Legal Adviser to the General Synod, and Joint Principal Registrar, Provinces of Canterbury and York. For services to the Church of England.
- Professor Rodney Harris, Professor of Medical Genetics and Consultant Physician, Saint Mary's Hospital, Manchester. For services to Medicine.
- Timothy Charles Harris, Assistant Managing Director, P&O Ltd, and President, Chamber of Shipping. For services to the Shipping Industry.
- Iain Victor Robinson Harrison, Chairman, Harrisons (Clyde) Ltd. For services to the Shipping Industry.
- Michael Anthony Haughey, Chief Nursing Officer, Department of Health and Social Services.
- Professor David Leslie Hawksworth, Director, International Mycological Institute. For services to Science.
- Professor Julia Stretton Higgins, Professor of Polymer Science, Department of Chemical Engineering, Imperial College, London. For services to Science.
- Anthony Strother Hopkins. For services to Industry.
- Professor John Garvie Robertson Howie, Professor of General Practice, University of Edinburgh. For services to Medicine.
- Hugh Royston Jenkins, lately Chairman, Property Advisory Group. For services to the Property Industry.
- Reginald Robert Jeune, OBE, States Senator, Jersey. For services to the community in Jersey.
- Elton Hercules John (Reginald Kenneth Dwight). For services to Music and for charitable services.
- Samuel Jones, DL, Town Clerk, Corporation of London. For services to the City of London.
- Donald Herbert Kirkham, Chief Executive, Woolwich Building Society. For services to the Building Society Movement.
- Andrew David Lansley. For political service.
- Hugh Albert Graeme Lapsley. For political service.
- William Thomas Little, lately head of Laboratory, Unilever Research. For services to the Food Industry.
- Alan Richard William Lotherington, Grade 5, Royal Mint.
- Robin Charles Mabey, lately Grade 5, Department of the Environment.
- Robert Emile Mabro, Director, Oxford Institute for Energy Studies. For services to the Energy Industry.
- Peter James Macdonald, Grade 4, Her Majesty's Stationery Office.
- Neil Mackie. For services to Music.
- Terence Stuart Mallinson, DL. For services to Forestry.
- Laurence John Martin, lately Senior Medical Officer, Department of Health.
- Bernard Piers Dewe Mathews, TD, Head of International Projects Division, J. Henry Schroder & Co. Ltd. For financial services to Industry and Exports.
- Ian Gerald McAllister, Chairman, Managing Director and Chief Executive, Ford Motor Company Ltd. For services to the Motor Manufacturing Industry.
- Diana Mary McConnell, DL. For political and public service.
- Professor Alan McGown, Professor of Civil Engineering, University of Strathclyde. For services to Geotextile Research.
- Robert Henry McGuigan. For services to Higher Education.
- Professor Ian Dews Mercer, lately Chief Executive, Countryside Council for Wales. For services to the Environment in Wales.
- Professor Anthony Patrick Leslie Minford, Edward Gonner Professor of Applied Economics, University of Liverpool. For services to Economics.
- Ernle David Drummond Money. For political service.
- Anne-Marie Sabina Nelson. For political and public service.
- Peter Carl Nilsson, Grade 4, Department of Social Security.
- Benjamin Roland Norton, Deputy Director General and Solicitor, Federation of Civil Engineering Contractors. For services to Construction Industry Safety.
- David Walter Pace, Regional Director of Finance, South Thames Regional Health Authority. For services to Health Care.
- Major Michael John Parker, CVO, MBE. For services to the VE Day Commemorations.
- Michael Ambrose Pattison, lately Secretary General and Chief Executive, Royal Institution of Chartered Surveyors. For services to Chartered Surveying.
- Robert Cameron Paul, Chief Executive, Albright and Wilson plc. For services to Business and to the Environment.
- Harold Lloyd Payne, OBE, President, National Federation of Far Eastern Prisoners of War Clubs and Associations. For services to ex-Servicemen and Women.
- Denise Platt, Under-Secretary, Association of Metropolitan Authorities. For services to the Social Services.
- James Andrew Pollock, Chief Executive, Livingston Development Corporation. For services to Industry in Scotland.
- Professor Brian Norman Christopher Prichard. For political service.
- Raymond Proctor, lately Finance/Privatisation Director, British Coal Corporation. For services to the Coal Industry.
- Alan Frederick Roberts, lately Chief Executive, Health and Safety Laboratory, Health and Safety Executive, Department of the Environment.
- John Morris Roberts, Historian. For services to History and to Education.
- William Nelson Robertson, lately Chief Executive, General Accident Group. For services to the Insurance Industry.
- Christopher John Robinson, lately Chairman, National Association of Health Authorities and Trusts. For services to Health Care.
- Nicolas Jack Roeg, Film Director. For services to the Film Industry.
- Arthur James Rose, Grade 4, Office for Standards in Education.
- Major Robert Mark Sherriff, Chairman, Territorial, Auxiliary and Volunteer Reserve Association, Highland Region.
- Margaret Stella Singh, lately Chair, Association of District Councils. For services to Local Government.
- Alan Christopher Smith, Chief Executive, Test and County Cricket Board. For services to Cricket.
- Barry Vernon Smith, lately Grade 5, Home Office.
- Dugal Nisbet-Smith, Director, the Newspaper Society. For services to Newspaper Industry.
- Peter Dryburgh Smith. For political service.
- John Garrett Speirs, Managing Director, Norsk Hydro (UK) Ltd. For services to Business and the Environment.
- Bernard Arthur Sperring, lately Grade 4, Highways Agency, Department of Transport.
- James Stobo, OBE. For services to Agriculture.
- Derek John Thomas, lately Chief Executive, Surrey County Council. For services to Local Government.
- Jill Paton Walsh, Writer. For services to Children's Literature.
- Raymond White, QPM, Chief Constable, Dyfed–Powys Police. For services to the Police.
- Paul Randall Williams, Chairman and Chief Executive, Council for the Central Laboratory of the Research Councils. For services to Science.
- Peter John Wood, Chairman, Direct Line Insurance plc. For services to the Insurance Industry.
- Evan Clive Woodcock, Chief Crown Prosecutor, Crown Prosecution Service.
- James Wyness, Lord Provost, City of Aberdeen District Council. For services to Local Government in Scotland.
- Patricia Wynne, OBE. For political and public service.

Diplomatic Service and Overseas List

- John Julius, Marquis de Amodio, OBE. For services to further education and UK/Swiss relations.
- James Richard Abe Bailey, DFC. For services to publishing in South Africa.
- Thomas Buchanan, Director, British Council, Hong Kong.
- George Anthony Hartley Deakin. For services to British commercial interests in South Africa.
- Leo Francis Goodstadt, JP, Head, Central Policy Unit, Hong Kong.
- The Honourable John Malcolm Gray, JP, Chairman, Hongkong and Shanghai Banking Corporation.
- Michael Sze Cho-cheung, ISO, JP, Secretary for the Civil Service, Hong Kong.
- John Tugwell. For services to UK/United States commercial relations and community service.
- Rosie Margaret Tse-tse Yeung, OBE, JP, Professor of Medicine, University of Hong Kong.

==== Officer of the Order of the British Empire (OBE) ====
Military Division

Royal Navy

- Commander Charles Peregrine George Abbott.
- Commander Robin Michael Howard Bawtree.
- Commander John Nicholas Edgell.
- Commander Christopher Arthur John Hill.
- Commander Matthew Cruickshanks Robb.
- Major David James Stewart, MC, Royal Marines.
- Commander Rosemary Wilson.

Army

- Lieutenant Colonel Roderick Norman Hine (490519), Royal Tank Regiment.
- Lieutenant Colonel Malcolm Douglas Ingram (487521), The Royal Logistic Corps.
- Lieutenant Colonel Roger David Lewis (505695), Adjutant General's Corps (ALS).
- Lieutenant Colonel Stephen Frederick Sherry (506486), Corps of Royal Engineers.
- Lieutenant Colonel John Montagu Wyatt (484978), Corps of Royal Engineers.

Royal Air Force

- Wing Commander Peter Alan Barrett (2607679).
- Wing Commander John Ernest Bates (2590543), Royal Air Force Volunteer Reserve (Training) (Retired).
- Wing Commander James David Bell, MBE, (1943505).
- Wing Commander Richard Geoffrey Box (5201258). (To be dated 4 November 1995.)
- Wing Commander Malcolm John Carlyle (4233134).
- Wing Commander Michael Greville Dudgeon (0608502).
- Wing Commander Nicholas Julian Eugene Kurth, MBE, (8015609).
- Wing Commander (now Group Captain) Clive Robert Loader (5202189).
- Wing Commander Michael Philip Westwood (4231753).

Civil Division

- Kenneth Adam, Production Designer. For services to the Film Industry.
- Hamish Christopher Adamson, lately Director (International), Law Society. For services to the Legal Profession.
- Sunday Prince Akpabio, lately Clinical Lecturer on Oral Health, University College Hospital, London, and Consultant Adviser to the World Health Organization. For services to Medicine and Dentistry.
- James Hodgson Armstrong. For services to Engineering and to Education.
- Graham John Arthurs, Consultant Anaesthetist, Ysbyty Maelor General Hospital, Wrecsam, Clwyd. For services to Medicine.
- Janet Marjorie Atkinson. For services to Education.
- The Reverend Wilbert Vere Awdry. For services to Children's Literature.
- The Reverend Lionel William Rupert Bacon. For services to Homeless People and to Toc H in Worthing, West Sussex.
- Arup Kumar Banerjee, lately Consultant Geriatric Physician and Medical Director, Bolton Hospitals NHS Trust. For services to Medicine.
- Michael Charles Banks, Joint Managing Director, Sidney C. Banks plc. For services to the Arable Crops Industry.
- Arthur Robert Barlow, Deputy Surveyor, New Forest, Forestry Commission.
- Thomas Myles Barrie, Deputy Chairman, Cumbernauld Development Corporation. For services to Industry.
- Leonard Richard Bays, lately Secretary General, International Water Supply Association. For services to the Water Industry.
- Edward William Beddoes, Technical Director, Vodafone Group plc. For scientific services to the Communications Industry.
- Campbell Jocelyn Hargreaves Benjamin, Mayor 1993–94, Deputy Mayor 1994–95, Bolton Metropolitan Borough Council. For services to Local Government.
- Professor Michael David Bennett, Keeper, Jodrell Laboratory, Royal Botanic Gardens, Kew.
- Fredric William Priestley Bentley. For services to the Prisons Board.
- Pauline Patricia Blow. For political service.
- James Edward Boddy, Regional Director, Frank Graham Consulting Engineers Ltd. For services to Highway Maintenance and to Civil Engineering.
- Jean Margaret Booker, Grade 7, Welsh Office.
- Alan John Bott, Director, P&O Containers Ltd. For services to Shipping.
- Brian Thomas Edward Boyle, Headteacher, Anfield Community Comprehensive School, Liverpool. For services to Education.
- Paul Robert Brankin. For services to Export to Japan.
- Noreen Anne Bray, Equal Opportunities Commissioner for Wales. For services to Equal Opportunities.
- Michael Anthony Brougham, Grade 6, Department of Social Security.
- Nicholas Paul Brown. For political and public service.
- Peter Ronald Buckley, Chairman and Group Chief Executive, Penspen Ltd. For services, to Export.
- Brian Burch, lately Chief Librarian, University of Leicester. For services to Librarianship.
- John Burrows, Chairman, FMC Corporation (UK) Ltd. For services to Business in North West England.
- John Bury, Chairman, Social Services Committee, Association of County Councils. For services to the Social Services.
- Ian Campbell, Principal Agricultural Officer, Scottish Office.
- Commander Peter Colin Drummond Campbell, LVO, DL. For services to the VE/VJ Day Commemorations in Northern Ireland.
- Brigadier William Douglas Cantley, MBE, Chief Executive, Tribute and Promise. For services to the VE/VJ Day Commemorations.
- Professor Lawrence John Challis, Lancashire-Spencer Professor of Physics, University of Nottingham. For services to Scientific Research.
- Alan Maxwell Chester, Official Receiver (B), Insolvency Service, Department of Trade and Industry.
- David Ernest Chiverton, Chairman of the Governing Body, Chichester College of Arts, Science and Technology. For services to Education.
- Charles Graham Clark, Governor 1, Her Majesty's Prison Wandsworth.
- William Coia Clark, Grade 7, Ministry of Defence.
- Robert Clasper, lately head of MOD's Project for Independent Safety Assessment and Advice, AEA Technology Consultancy Services, UKAEA. For services to the Defence Industry.
- Nigel Hugh Clutton. For services to the Crown Estate and to the Church Commissioners.
- Betty Cohen. For services to the community in Manchester and Tameside.
- Estelle Marie Collard, lately Diplomatic Service Grade 5, Foreign and Commonwealth Office.
- Bryan Collins, Managing Director and Chief Executive, Bristow Helicopter Group Ltd. For services to the Helicopter Industry and to the community in Bromley, Kent.
- Beryl Frances Cook, Artist. For services to Art.
- Colonel Mark Edward Hatt-Cook, RD. For services to the Territorial Army and Volunteer Reserves.
- Geoffrey Charles Cooper, Managing Director, Chelton Ltd. For services to the Airborne Radio Antenna Industry.
- George Frederick Coppock, lately Grade 6, Ministry of Defence.
- Major James Charles Cowley, DCM, President, Distinguished Conduct Medal League.
- Wing Commander Ronald Joseph Cuff, RAF Volunteer Reserve (Training) (Rtd.), Chairman, Air Training Corps, Sussex.
- Stephen Cummings, Grade 6, Ministry of Defence.
- Maurice Leonard Dalton, LVO, Diplomatic Service Grade 5, Foreign and Commonwealth Office.
- Professor Janet Howard Darbyshire, Head, Medical Research Council's HIV Clinical Trials Centre. For services to Medical Research.
- Alison Davies, Divisional Director (Scotland), Save the Children. For charitable services.
- Anthony de Angeli, Editorial Director, William Reed Publishing Ltd. For services to Journalism and to the Food Industry.
- Sylvia Ernestine Denton, Immediate Past Chairman, Royal College of Nursing's Breast Care Nursing Society. For services to Health Care.
- Peter Michael Diamond, lately Director, Birmingham Museums and Art Gallery. For services to Museums and Galleries.
- Christine Mary Dodgson. For political and public service.
- Michael John Dudding, TD, lately Grade 7, Department of Transport.
- William Joseph Dunlop, MBE. For services to Motor Cycle Racing and for humanitarian services.
- William Wilson Dunlop, QFSM, lately Chief Fire Officer, Tyne and Wear Metropolitan Fire Brigade. For services to the Fire Service.
- Marjorie Eleanor Dykins, Chairperson, Wales Council for Voluntary Action. For services to the Community in Wales.
- Judith Edwards. For services to Nursing in Wales.
- Shaun Edwards. For services to Rugby League Football.
- Graham George Eustance. For political and public service.
- David Evans, Water Resources Planning Manager, Anglian Region, National Rivers Authority. For services to the Water Industry.
- Edward Gordon Evans. For services to the Construction Industry.
- Terence Fallon, Grade 7, Department of Trade and Industry.
- Joan Sheila Felthouse. For services to the Royal Society for the Prevention of Cruelty to Animals.
- George Marshall Fish, DL. For services to the Magistracy.
- Ronald Flanagan. For services to the Police.
- Colin Flint, Principal, Solihull College. For services to Education.
- Richard Downing Freeman, Corporate Chief Economist, Imperial Chemical Industries plc. For services to Industry.
- The Reverend Ronald William Frost. For services to Young People.
- Jean Gaffin, Executive Director, National Council for Hospice and Specialist Palliative Care Services. For services to Health Care.
- Bernard Gallacher. For services to Golf.
- John Robert Ganson, lately Rector, Kirkton High School, Dundee. For services to Education.
- Captain Alexander David Liddell Gardiner, MBE, Vice-President, Soldiers', Sailors' and Airmen's Families Association, Inverness-shire and Western Isles.
- Professor Dorothy Ann Malcolm Geddes, Professor of Oral Biology, University of Glasgow. For services to Dentistry.
- David Frank Thomas Gent, Grade 7, Department of Social Security.
- Michael James German. For political and public service.
- David Edward Gibbons. For services to the community in Kent.
- Mary Stella Gibbons, Chairman, WRVS Benevolent Trust.
- Nigel Frank Gifford. For services to British Commercial Interests Overseas.
- Philip Stephen Gilbert, Head of Events Programmes, BBC. For services to the VE/VJ Day Commemorations.
- Archibald Gilchrist. For services to Industry and to Public Life in Scotland.
- David Michael Gillen, Grade 6, Department of the Environment.
- Paul Gotley, Chairman and Chief Executive, Neotronics Technology plc. For services to Manufacturing Industry.
- Patricia Anne Greenhill, Provost, Stirling District Council. For services to Local Government in Scotland.
- William Tudor Gunston. For services to Aviation Journalism.
- Richard Hugh Guy, Chief Executive, Manchester Training and Enterprise Council. For services to Training and Enterprise.
- Janice Elizabeth Hall, Chairman, British Overseas Trade Board's Small Firms Committee. For services to Export.
- Allan Edward Harbert, Grade 7, Department of the Environment.
- Roderick Anthony David Harris, Principal Professional and Technology Officer. Ministry of Defence.
- Michael Robin Hayns. For services to Nuclear Safety.
- Henry Joseph Heaney, Librarian and Keeper of Hunterian Books and Manuscripts, University of Glasgow. For services to Librarianship.
- John David Henderson. For services to Medicine.
- The Reverend Canon Colin Arnold Clifford Hill. For services to the community in Croydon, Surrey.
- Richard Inglis Hill, Director of Roads and Transportation, Borders Regional Council. For services to Local Government.
- Sir Timothy Edward Charles Hoare, Bt. For services to the Church of England.
- Major Christopher Basil Holden, Assistant Chief Inspecting Officer of Railways, Health and Safety Executive, Department of the Environment.
- Tessa Christine Holdroyd. For political service.
- David John Holliday, Assistant Collector, Her Majesty's Customs and Excise.
- John Christopher Hollman, lately Grade 7, Department of Health.
- Brian Reginald Homer, lately Chairman, Devon Magistrates' Courts Committee. For services to the Magistracy in South West England.
- Michael John Horne, Head of Information, World War II Commemorations Team. For services to the VE/VJ Day Commemorations.
- Patricia Julie Horsman, Inspector, Her Majesty's Board of Inland Revenue.
- Alan Houghton, lately Director, Northern Group, British Coal Corporation. For services to the Coal Industry.
- Eileen Marguerite Hounsell, President, British Red Cross Society, West Midlands.
- James Kenneth Humble, Chief Executive, Local Authority Co-ordinating Body on Food and Trading Standards. For services to Trading Standards.
- Colonel Robert Dow Hunter, MC, TD, DL. For services to Clubs for Young People, Surrey.
- David Stephens Hyslop, lately Director, Breakthrough Trust. For services to Deaf People.
- James Anthony Iddison. For services to Industrial Tribunals.
- Richard Anthony James, Senior Gas Engineer, Sarajevo. For humanitarian services in the former Yugoslavia.
- Roy Harvey Johnstone, lately Chairman, Medical Appeal Tribunals.
- David Jones, Superintendent of Parks and Gardens, Corporation of London. For services to Horticulture.
- Robert Gerallt Jones. For services to' the Arts, particularly Literature, in Wales.
- Thomas Henry Jones. For services to Agriculture in Wales.
- Dennis Keech, Chairman, Automotive Components Dunstable, Automould & Mitapres Ltd, Stroud. For services to the Motor Manufacturing Industry.
- Professor Gilbert Kelling, Professor of Geology, Keele University. For services to Environmental Protection.
- David Francis Kessler. For services to The Jewish Chronicle and to the Jewish community.
- Desmond Reginald Kettle. For services to Blind People.
- William Keys. For services to the Fire Service.
- Harry Donald Kitchin, Managing Director, Bournlea Instruments Ltd. For services to the Defence Industry.
- Geoffrey Knowles. For political service.
- The Reverend David Doig Laing, Chair, Strathclyde Region Social Work Committee and Vice Convener, Convention of Scottish Local Authorities Social Work Committee. For services to Local Government in Scotland.
- Timothy James Lawes. For political service.
- Alan Dawes Lea. For services to the Magistracy in Lincolnshire.
- John Anthony Lewis, Principal, Dixons City Technology College, Bradford. For services to Education.
- Frances Mary Line, Controller, BBC Radio 2. For services to Radio Broadcasting.
- David Owen Lloyd, Director and Partner, Sir William Halcrow & Partners Ltd. For services to Engineering.
- Allan Anthony MacDonald, lately Managing Director, Jetstream Aircraft Ltd. For services to the Aviation Industry.
- Charles Thomas Macer, Grade 7, Ministry of Agriculture, Fisheries and Food.
- George Macgregor. For services to Amateur Golf.
- James Geoffrey Machin. For services to Forestry.
- Graham Roche Mackenzie, Member, School Curriculum and Assessment Authority. For services to Education.
- Hugh Robertson Mackintosh, Scottish Director of Child Care, Barnardo's. For services to Young People.
- Hugh Archie MacFadyen MacLean, lately Chairman, Crofters Commission. For services to Crofting.
- John David MacMillan, Principal Professional and Technology Officer, Ministry of Defence.
- David John Maidment, Controller, Safety Policy, Safety and Standards Directorate, Railtrack. For services to the Railway Industry.
- Kenneth John Mair, Farmer. For services to Agriculture in Aberdeenshire.
- Ronald George Manley, Senior Principal Scientific Officer, Ministry of Defence.
- Colin John Manning, DL. For services to the Magistracy in Hereford and Worcester.
- Professor Shula Eta Marks, Professor of Southern Africa History, University of London. For services to History.
- Clive Edwin Martin, Assistant Controller, Her Majesty's Board of Inland Revenue.
- Frank Charles Mason. For political and public service.
- Patrick Camillus McAleavey. For services to Education.
- Ian Gilchrist McBain, Director, Scottish Council for Spastics. For charitable services.
- Patricia McCoy. For services to Physiotherapy.
- Kevin McDonald, Chairman and Managing Director, Polypipe plc. For services to the Plumbing Industry.
- Norbert James McEwan, Grade 7, Ministry of Defence.
- Richard James Meadows, Grade 6, Her Majesty's Treasury.
- Professor Isi Metzstein. For services to Architecture.
- Graham Mifflin, Deputy District Inspector, Her Majesty's Board of Inland Revenue.
- George Richardson Miller, lately National Chairman, Royal British Legion Scotland.
- Gordon Stopford Millington. For services to Civil Engineering.
- Wilfred Johnston Mitchell. For services to the community and to Agriculture.
- Robert Shepard Alastair Moir, Grade 7, Scottish Office.
- John David Moore. For services to the Chartered Association of Certified Accountants.
- Peter MacCandless Mundell Moore. For. services to Tourism.
- William Morrison, VRD. For political and public service.
- Samuel Boyd Morrow, Inspector Grade I, Department of Agriculture.
- Margaret Rose (Peggy) Mount, Actress. For services to Drama.
- William Wallace Murray, Chief Executive, South Tees Acute Hospitals NHS Trust. For services to Health Care.
- John Neil, Secretary, The Boys' Brigade, Glasgow. For services to Young People.
- John Russell Niblett, lately Grade 6, Crown Prosecution Service.
- Captain Derek Anthony Power O'Reilly, Royal Navy (Retd.), Chairman, the National Trust's Wessex Region. For services to Conservation.
- Tyrone O'Sullivan. For services to Industry in South Wales.
- David Frederick Ogilvy, Executive Vice Chairman, British Light Aviation Centre Ltd., and of the Aircraft Owners' and Pilots' Association. For services to Aviation.
- Gwilym Owen. For charitable services in Wales.
- Philip Royston Oxley, Director of Research, Centre for Logistics and Transportation, Cranfield University. For services to the Mobility of Disabled People.
- Louise Maureen Pankhurst, Director, Child Psychotherapy Trust, Immediate Past Director, Child Accident Prevention Trust, London. For services to Road Safety.
- Cuthbert Alexander Pascall. For services to Community Relations.
- Lieutenant Colonel Robert Arnold Payne, Member, St John Council for Buckinghamshire.
- Joyce Pedersen, lately Grade 7, Highways Agency, Department of Transport.
- Robin David Peverett, lately Director of Education, Incorporated Association of Preparatory Schools. For services to Education.
- Joan Robertson Phelan, Member, Co-ordinating Committee Board of Visitors and Member, Her Majesty's Young Offenders Institution, Feltham.
- Eric Philipson, Assistant Controller, Her Majesty's Board of Inland Revenue.
- Andrew Wyndham Phillips, Founder, the Citizenship Foundation. For services to the Law and to Young People.
- Peter Haydn Phillips, Chairman, Royal Berkshire and Battle Hospitals NHS Trust. For services to Health Care.
- Simon Anthony Edward Pilley, County Chairman, Cleveland Scouts. For services to Scouting.
- Susan Veronica Pollok. For political service.
- Sheila Catherine Puckle, MBE, TD, General Secretary, St John Fellowship.
- Paul Walter Reginald Pumfrey, DL. For services to the community in Lincolnshire.
- Kenneth Richard Ray, lately Dean, Faculty of Dental Surgery, Royal College of Surgeons of England. For services to Medicine.
- Claire Berenice Rayner, Writer and Broadcaster. For services to Women's Issues and to Health Issues.
- John Peter Abercromby Readman, Chairman, Chamber Orchestra of Europe. For services to Music.
- Gordon Caulston Rees, lately Headmaster, Danetre School, Daventry, Northamptonshire. For services to Education.
- Dermot Alexander Reeve. For services to Cricket.
- Alan James Reid, Principal Valuer, Her Majesty's Board of Inland Revenue.
- The Reverend Kathleen Margaret Richardson, Moderator, Free Church Federal Council. For services to the Methodist community.
- Paula Frances Cooper Ridley, DL, Chair, Liverpool Housing Action Trust, and Member, Merseyside Development Corporation. For services to Urban Regeneration.
- Goronwy Roberts, Chief Officer, Essex Ambulance Service NHS Trust. For services to Health Care.
- Alistair Duncan Irvine Robertson. For services to the Scottish Business Achievement Award Trust.
- Professor Charles Calthorpe Robertson, Chairman, Building Standards Advisory Committee. For services to the Building Industry.
- Ernest Thomson Robinson, TD, Chairman, Council of the St Andrew's Ambulance Association. For services to Health Care.
- Vincent Robinson, Grade 6, Department for Education and Employment.
- John Rose, Chairman, Hertford Regional College Corporation. For services to Education.
- Norma Theresa Roth, Chairman, Women's Health and Screening Delegation. For services to Health Care.
- William Henry John Rowe. For political and public service.
- Michael Hugh Rumble, Grade 6, Home Office.
- Simon George Schanschieff, Chairman, Northamptonshire Health Authority. For services to Health Care.
- Maureen Veronica Sedgwick, lately Head, The Ridings High School, Winterbourne, Avon. For services to Education.
- John William Sellars, Company Secretary, Association of Scottish Colleges. For services to Further Education.
- Stephanie Simmonds, Grade 6, Overseas Development Administration.
- Peter Anthony Simpson. For political and public service.
- Wing Commander Gordon Leonard Sinclair, DFC, lately President, Royal Society for the Prevention of Accidents. For services to Road Safety.
- Lorna Jean Sinclair (Mrs. Carter), Grade 7, Her Majesty's Customs and Excise.
- Kendra Slawinski. For services to Netball.
- Christopher Gordon Smith, Immediate Past Chairman, Association of Conservation Officers. For services to Building Conservation.
- Joseph Colin Smith, lately Consultant Urological Surgeon, Churchill Hospital, Oxford. For services to Medicine.
- Josephine Ann Smith, Chief Nurse, Nuffield Hospitals. For services to Nursing.
- Joye Powlett Smith, DL. For services to the community in South Yorkshire.
- Hugh Smyth. For services to Local Government.
- Colonel John Nicholas Blashford-Snell, MBE. For services to Young People through Operation Raleigh.
- Roger Lee Spooner, Research Scientist, Roslin Institute. For services to Animal Breeding Research.
- Professor Janet Irene Sprent, Deputy Principal, University of Dundee. For services to Science and to Education.
- Professor Margaret Honor Spufford. For services to Social History and to Higher Education for People with Disabilities.
- Jeffrey James Stansfield, lately County Surveyor, Suffolk County Council. For services to Civil Engineering and Highway Maintenance.
- Drew Stevenson, lately Chief Executive, London Borough of Newham. For services to Local Government.
- Richard David Stratton, Chairman, Farming and Wildlife Advisory Group. For services to Nature Conservation.
- Philip Eric John Stroud, DL. For services to the Pallant House and Art Gallery, Chichester, West Sussex.
- Malcolm James Sullivan, QPM, Deputy Assistant Commissioner, Metropolitan Police. For services to the Police.
- Robert Frederick Symes, Keeper of Mineralogy, Natural History Museum.
- Agnes Mary Tait, Member, Cumbria County Council. For services to Local Government.
- Angus Murray Thornley Taylor, Education Adviser, Government Office North East, Department for Education and Employment.
- Bryan George Samuel Taylor, Director, Technical Affairs, UK Offshore Operators Association. For services to Health and Safety.
- Ernest George Thomas, lately Grade 7, Land Registry.
- Graham Stanley Philip Thomas, Chairman and Managing Director, Combined Services Publications Ltd. For services to the Defence Industry.
- John Elvet Malcolm Thomas, lately Headteacher, Ysgol Gyfun Gymraeg Glantaf, Cardiff. For services to Education.
- Eric Charles Till. For services to the community in Stamford, Lincolnshire.
- Christopher Todd, Joint Director General, International Fund for Ireland, Department of Finance and Personnel.
- John Maxwell Turner, Vice-Principal, Writtle Agricultural College, Essex. For services to Agricultural Education and Training.
- Raymond William Twiddle, Chairman, British Poultry Meat Federation. For services. to the Poultry Industry.
- Thomas Antony Hugh Tyler, Grade 6, Department for Education and Employment.
- Valerie Tyler, lately Grade 7, Department of Health.
- Anne Vaughan. For services to the Magistracy.
- George Lowthian Veitch, Chief Commandmant, Cumbria Special Constabulary. For services to the Police.
- Rosemary Isabel Baird Verey, Author and Horticulturist. For services to Garden Design and History.
- Sidney David Votier, Partner, Carpmaels & Ransford. For services to the Patent Profession.
- Martin Nicholas Wargent, Chief Probation Officer, Essex. For services to the Probation Service.
- Ronald Edward Watkins, DFC, Chairman, High Value Horticulture plc. For services to Export.
- Brian Richard Anthony Derek Watson. For political and public service.
- Walter Rhys Webb. For services to Local Government in Clwyd.
- Michael Derek West, lately Grade 6, Her Majesty's Paymaster General's Office.
- Squadron Leader Kenneth Gordon White, Secretary, Soldiers' Sailors' and Airmen's Families Association, Bedfordshire.
- Peter Williams, lately Chairman, Consortium of Lead Bodies for the Extractive Industries. For services to Health and Safety.
- Brian Wilson, lately Chief Executive, Inverness District Council. Deputy Chief Executive, the Highland Council. For services to Local Government in Scotland.
- Harry Cowan Wilson, Medicines Commissioner. For services to Veterinary Medicine.
- James Noel Wilson, Vice-Chairman, World Orthopaedic Concern (UK). For services to Orthopaedics Worldwide.
- Charles Anthony Wood, lately Chairman, New Islington and Hackney Housing Association. For services to Housing.
- Stella May Wood, Grade 7, Department of Trade and Industry.
- John Charles Woodcock. For services to Sports Journalism.
- Peter Michael Heppell Young, Department of National Heritage Events Director, World War II Commemorations Team. For services to the VE/VJ Day Commemorations.

Diplomatic Service and Overseas List

- The Reverend Canon John Gerald Barton Andrew. For charitable and community services in New York.
- Colin Robert Armstrong. For services to British interests in Ecuador.
- Roger Ronald Martin Bonner. For services to construction development assistance overseas.
- Daniel Rodolph Valentine Edwards, MBE, Deputy Speaker, Montserrat Legislative Council.
- George Gibbons, Headmaster, St. Michael's International School, Kobe.
- The Venerable Peter John Hawker. For services to the British community in Switzerland.
- Jack Raymond Hignell, Honorary British Consul, Winnipeg.
- Peter Francis Hilken, Director, British Council, Sierra Leone.
- Dr. Valerie Margaret Inchley For services to the British community and to health care in Nepal.
- The Reverend Peter Jackson. For services to the community in Kobe.
- Gordon Mackenzie Johnston, HM Ambassador, Ljublijana.
- David John Francis King, Director, British Council, New Zealand.
- Jan Juliusz Kluk. For services to British commercial interests in Poland.
- Daniel Shing Cheong Koo. For services to British commercial interests in Hong Kong.
- Albert Lam Chi-chiu, JP, Director of Urban Services, Hong Kong.
- Christopher Patrick Langley. For services to British commercial interests in Malaysia.
- Leong Ka-chai. For services to futures trading in Hong Kong.
- Victor Lo Chung-wing, JP. For services to industrial development in Hong Kong.
- Eric Lye Kum-chew. For. services to architecture in Hong Kong.
- Susan Margaret Maingay, Director, British Council, Baltic States.
- Dugald Aitken McKellar, lately HM Consul, Athens.
- Alexander Donald Leopold Alphonso Maria Moll. For services to British commercial interests in Morocco.
- John Neville Morphett, Honorary Consul-General, Adelaide.
- Barry John New. For services to British commercial interests in the United States of America.
- Ng Yee-yum, JP. For services to civil engineering in Hong Kong.
- John Wyn Parry. For services to British commercial interests in Japan and to the community.
- Otto Lok To Poon. For services to British commercial interests in Hong Kong.
- Michael Walter Powles, HM Consul (Commercial), Johannesburg.
- Timothy Christopher John Ridley. For voluntary services to the community in the Cayman Islands.
- Robert Leslie Robinson. For medical services to the community, in Southern India.
- Douglas Paul Russell. For services to development assistance in law enforcement in Zambia and to wildlife conservation in Africa.
- David Herbert, Viscount Samuel. For services to British academic and commercial interest in Israel.
- Leslie Straughan, Honorary British Consul, Halifax.
- Michael Victor Summers, General Manager, Falkland Islands Development Corporation.
- Philip Peter Sutton. For services to British commercial interests and the community in Sierra Leone.
- Maureen Tejeda, MBE, Honorary Consul, Santo Domingo.
- Frederik Gordon Roy Ward, lately Chief Justice, Tonga.
- Lillian Paterson Wong, British Government Liaison Officer, Kigali.
- Yeung Kim-choy, JP. For public service in Hong Kong.
- Yeung Yue-mah. For academic and public service in Hong Kong.

==== Member of the Order of the British Empire (MBE) ====
Military Division

Royal Navy

- Chief Petty Officer Air Engineering Artificer (M) Michael Albert John Barnard, D114649N.
- Marine David Charles Barnett, P029653D.
- Band Colour Sergeant Vivian Gareth John Davies, Royal Marines, Q004101A.
- Lieutenant Marie Eole Benjamin Genevieve.
- Chief Petty Officer Physical Trainer Terence Bruce Godfrey, D089344W.
- Lieutenant Commander David Edwin Hambrook.
- Lieutenant Commander William Craig Hannaford.
- Surgeon Lieutenant Commander Paul Michael Kemp.
- Warrant Officer John Francis Kirk.
- Lieutenant Commander David Malcolm John Lewis.
- Petty Officer (Radar) Neil Anthony Magee, D179356X.
- Captain David Jones Marino, Royal Marines.
- Lieutenant Commander (SCC) Michael Lyden O'Connor, Royal Naval Reserve.
- Chief Petty Officer Wren Quarters Administrator Sandra Palmer, W128736X.
- Acting Chief Petty Officer Physical Trainer Robert Michael Penfold, D142512B.
- Chief Petty Officer Steward Anthony Redden, D137442M.
- Lieutenant Commander Duncan Reid.
- Lieutenant Commander Melvin Erroll Robinson.
- Warrant Officer David Paul Stokes.
- Lieutenant Commander Kevin Todd.
- Warrant Officer Class 2 Robert Mason Ward, Royal Marines.
- Charge Chief Marine Engineering Artificer (ML) Paul Stephen Wincott, D148123D.

Army

- Major Stephen John de Mansfield Absolon, BEM, (526154), Royal Regiment of Artillery.
- 24340628 Warrant Officer Class 1 Charles Richard Aggett, The Royal Logistic Corps.
- 24639781 Sergeant Stuart Armstrong, Royal Corps of Signals.
- Major Philip Anthony Astle (509483), The Cheshire Regiment.
- Major (Queen's Gurkha Officer) Balasing Gurung (521505), The Queen's Own Gurkha Transport Regiment.
- 24341527 Warrant Officer Class 1 Ian Paul Baverstock, The Royal Logistic Corps.
- Q1013772 Sergeant Teresa Ann Birkenshaw, Queen Alexandra's Royal Army Nursing Corps.
- 24300689 Warrant Officer Class 1 William Burns Brodie, The Royal Logistic Corps.
- F0448001 Warrant Officer Class 2 Margaret Pearl Lynette Bulgin, The Royal Irish Regiment.
- Major Shaun Alex Burley (513298), Corps of Royal Engineers.
- Major (now Lieutenant Colonel) Simon Caraffi (502391), Royal Tank Regiment.
- Major Robert Gordon Card, BEM, (510821), The Royal Logistic Corps.
- Major Nicholas Patrick Carter (505216), The Royal Green Jackets.
- Lieutenant Colonel John Anthony Charteris, MC, (468963), The Royal Scots.
- Major John Anthony Spencer Clunn (522561), Royal Army Medical Corps.
- W0478612 Sergeant Rachel Cooper, Adjutant General's Corps (SPS).
- Major John Gordon Harvey Corrigan (471236), The Royal Gurkha Rifles.
- 24357447 Warrant Officer Class 1 Bernard Docherty, Adjutant General's Corps (SPS).
- Captain Simon John Dunn (530071), Royal Army Medical Corps.
- 24590186 Corporal Stephen Francis Foster, Royal Army Medical Corps.
- W0467858 Warrant Officer Class 2 Teresa Alison Griffiths, Adjutant General's Corps (SPS).
- Lieutenant (Acting Captain) David Leslie Haynes (541370), Royal Regiment of Artillery.
- Major Simon Patrick Hogge (477775), The Queen's Lancashire Regiment.
- 24378013 Staff Sergeant Peter Leslie Arthur George Humphrey, Corps of Royal Electrical and Mechanical Engineers.
- Captain Keith Malcolm Jeffery (526563), Corps of Royal Engineers.
- 24558227 Sergeant (now Colour Sergeant) Colin Richard Jones, The Royal Welch Fusiliers.
- 21164171 Sergeant Kamalbahadur Nepali, The Royal Gurkha Rifles.
- 24220499 Sergeant James Joseph Francis Kelly, Irish Guards.
- Lieutenant (Acting Lieutenant Colonel) Hugh Wilson Ostle Kennon (475925), Combined Cadet Force, Territorial Army.
- Captain Carlisle Kinghan (512793), Royal Regiment of Artillery, Territorial Army.
- Major John Frank Knopp (486681), The Prince of Wales's Own Regiment of Yorkshire.
- 24407914 Corporal John Lamb, The Royal Logistic Corps.
- Major (now Lieutenant Colonel) Michael Richard Lanham (497454), The Royal. Logistic Corps.
- 23845268 Warrant Officer Class 2 David John Andrew Laraman, Royal Army Medical Corps.
- 24742400 Sergeant (now Staff Sergeant) Steven John Levick, Adjutant General's Corps (PRO).
- 24233403 Warrant Officer Class 2 Gary Lee Long, The Royal Anglian Regiment.
- 23994580 Warrant Officer Class 2 David Geoffrey Longcake, Royal Regiment of Artillery.
- 24191925 Warrant Officer Class 1 Frank Lynch, The Royal Regiment of Wales.
- Captain Peter David McCarten (532690), The Royal Logistic Corps.
- Major Selby Charles Macduff-Duncan (495550), The Black Watch.
- Major James King McKee (509316), Royal Corps of Signals.
- 25002783 Private (now Lance Corporal) Martin Maryan, Adjutant General's Corps (SPS).
- Lieutenant (now Captain) Peter Henry Keogh May (541863), The Royal Dragoon Guards.
- 24210836 Lance Corporal David Edward Metcalf, The Royal Logistic Corps, Territorial Army.
- Major William John Mooney, TD, (519907), The Royal Logistic Corps, Territorial Army.
- Major William Michael Gibson Morris (503881), Corps of Royal Engineers.
- Major Thomas Anthony Philip Mullarkey (500841), Royal Regiment of Artillery.
- W0806564 Corporal Louise Kennedy Noone, The Royal Logistic Corps.
- Major Stephen James Oxlade (495565), The Royal Gloucestershire, Berkshire and Wiltshire Regiment.
- Major Stephen Pickles (511449), Corps of Royal Engineers.
- 24333295 Warrant Officer Class 2 (now Warrant Officer Class 1) John Pinkney, Royal Regiment of Artillery.
- Major (now Lieutenant Colonel) Andrew Charles Pope (493078), Corps of Royal Engineers.
- Lieutenant (Acting Captain) Douglas Brian Pover (516494), Army Cadet Force, Territorial Army.
- Major Christopher Thomas Stanton Prestwich (488823), The Light Dragoons.
- Major Robert James Reid (511158), Royal Regiment of Artillery.
- 24093991 Warrant Officer Class 2 Kevin Riley, The Parachute Regiment.
- Major Brian Murdoch Ritchie (514935), The Highlanders.
- Major Paul Trevor Roberts, TD, (463019), Adjutant General's Corps (SPS), Territorial Army.
- Major John William Rollins (497498), The Royal Anglian Regiment.
- 24327737 Warrant Officer Class 1 John Todd Selkirk, Royal Corps of Signals.
- 24841463 Corporal Dominic Seymour, Corps of Royal Engineers.
- 23862109 Warrant Officer Class 1 Kenneth Taylor, Royal Army Medical Corps.
- 24408503 Warrant Officer Class 1 Paul Kevin Tidey, The Princess of Wales's Royal Regiment.
- 24293621 Warrant Officer Class 1 Scott Traynor, The Royal Logistic Corps.
- Major Frederick David Tucker (528167), The Devonshire and Dorset Regiment, Territorial Army.

Overseas Award

- Major Charles Graeme Large, Royal Hong Kong Regiment (The Volunteers).

Royal Air Force

- Squadron Leader Mark Lawrence Ashwell (5204644).
- Sergeant Neil Bailey (B8140087).
- Sergeant (now Chief Technician) John Gerard Brimley, BEM, (H8197981).
- Squadron Leader Paul Anthony Byram (4232874).
- Flight Sergeant (now Master Aircrew) Ian Leonard Cheese (R8141281).
- Warrant Officer Alan James Day, BEM, (A8072048).
- Chief Technician Stuart Dodd (A4271765).
- Warrant Officer John Hamilton (C1935924).
- Squadron Leader Kevin Hann (8023466).
- Flight Lieutenant Stephen Sautelle Hayes (0230391), Royal Australian Air Force.
- Squadron Leader Michael Arthur Hollin (8023707).
- Chief Technician Patrick John Jamison (G8142049).
- Squadron Leader Robert Morton Joy (0687277).
- Flight Sergeant George David Lait (D8070432).
- Flight Sergeant Robert George Loew (Q8077855).
- Senior Aircraftman David Mackell (Q8247363).
- Squadron Leader The Honourable David Paul Murray (8023715).
- Squadron Leader David Graham Parry (5203735).
- Senior Aircraftwoman Serena Helen Richford (D8237207).
- Squadron Leader John Rooke (0208228), Royal Air Force Volunteer Reserve (Training).
- Warrant Officer Alistair Buchanan Stewart (P1950442).
- Warrant Officer Peter Harry Stockdale (B4290558).
- Warrant Officer Brian William Sutherland (M4286430).
- Squadron Leader Lionel Greyham George Cartwright-Terry (0608919).
- Squadron Leader Stephen Eric Thomas (8140958).
- Senior Aircraftwoman Debby Walker (L8237427).
- Squadron Leader David Warneford (0683555).
- Warrant Officer Peter Whyte (LI941170).
- Warrant Officer Anthony Thomas Williams (T1937947).
- Squadron Leader John Graham Williams (4232606).
- Warrant Officer Peter Townshend Wood (L0687676).

Civil Division

- Allison Elizabeth Adams, Head of Glenwood Campus, Langside College, Glasgow. For services to Education.
- Alexander Addison, lately General Medical Practitioner, Douglas, Lanarkshire. For services to Medicine.
- Michael Robert Aitchison, Air Movements Logistician. For humanitarian services in the former Yugoslavia.
- Angela Jean Allen, Script Supervisor/Continuity Girl. For services to the Film Industry.
- Alan Allwood, Police Sergeant, Nottinghamshire Constabulary. For services to the Police.
- David Anderson, Director of Sales (Africa), Massey Ferguson Group Ltd. For services to Export.
- David Anderson, Catering Manager Grade III, Northern Ireland Office.
- Peter John Andrew. For services to Mountain Rescue.
- Marion Dorothy Lilian Andrews. For voluntary services to St. George's Hospital, Tooting, Pain Control Department, and to the Multiple Sclerosis Society.
- Doris Angel. For services to the community in Manchester.
- Albert John Annis. For services to the Royal British Legion and Air Training Corps in Pershore, Worcestershire.
- Jane Apedaile. For services to the community in Abbeystead, Lancaster.
- Charles John Arch. For services to Welsh Agriculture and to the Community.
- Kenneth Arthur Armson, lately Signaller, Edge Hill Signalbox, Railtrack. For services to the Railway Industry.
- Ian Archibald Armstrong, Chairman, South Tyne Committee for the Employment of People with Disabilities. For services to the Employment of Disabled People.
- Jane Armstrong, Church Youth and Community Worker, Durham County Council. For services to the community on the Woodhouse Close Estate, Bishop Auckland.
- Myles Spencer Arnfield, Chairman, Marple and District Committee for Cancer Relief and Research. For charitable services.
- Madeleine Arnold, Chairman of Governors, La Retraite Roman Catholic Girls' School, Lambeth, London. For. services to Education.
- Colin William Gadsby Ash, Financial Analyst, the National Grid Company plc. For services to the Electricity Industry.
- Ijaz Ashraf. For services to Race Relations in Central Scotland.
- Kathleen Mary Atkinson, lately Higher Scientific Officer, Institute of Freshwater Ecology. For services to Science.
- David Bainbridge, lately Manager, Ashley House Voluntary Managed Approved Hostel, Bristol. For services to the community.
- Doris Mabel Bainbridge. For services to the community in Appleby, Cumbria.
- Stephen Baines. For political and public service.
- William Alexander Baird, Chairman, Portpatrick Station Branch, Royal National Lifeboat Institution. For services to the RNLI.
- Anthony Leonard Baker, Support Manager III, Northern Ireland Office.
- The Reverend Douglas William James Bale. For services to the community in Cardiff.
- Marguerita Balfour. For services to the community in Fortrose and Rosemarkie, Ross-shire.
- Margaret Rose Banks. For services to The Guide Association.
- Noel Berry Banks. For services to WaterAid.
- Charles Bannister. For services to the community in Harrow, Middlesex.
- Anne Voss-Bark. For services to Tourism in Devon.
- David Eric Barker, Farmer. For services to Conservation in East Anglia.
- Steven Kenneth Edward Barnes, Convoy Leader. For humanitarian services in the former Yugoslavia.
- Valerie A. Barrie, Headteacher, Ettrick Primary School. For services to Education.
- Barbara Barrowclough, Administrative Officer, Ministry of Defence.
- Adrian Barton, Auxiliary in Charge, HM Coastguard, Ventnor, Isle of Wight. For services to Safety at Sea.
- Rosemary Bashford. For services to Training and Development.
- David Joseph Batten, Messenger, Ministry of Defence.
- Violet Bawler. For services to the community in Curry Mallet, Taunton, Somerset.
- Jane Violet Johnston Baxter. For services to Road Safety in Tayside.
- George Fraser Beaton, Roads Foreman, Forestry Commission.
- George Beck, Ship Manager, Swan Hunter Shipbuilders. For services to the Defence Industry.
- James Andrew Begg, General Medical Practitioner, Ayr. For services to Medicine and to the community.
- Joan Patricia Bury Henderson-Begg, lately Chairman, Sharnbrook House Residential Club WRVS. For services to the community.
- Kenneth William Bell, Regional Treasurer, Yorkshire and Humberside Energy Management Groups. For services to Energy Efficiency.
- Frank Walter Bennett, Chairman, Royal Air Forces Association, Eastern Area.
- Robert Frederick Bennett, lately Police Constable, British Transport Police. For services to Rail Transport.
- David Michael Bird, Senior Executive Officer, Royal Courts of Justice, Lord Chancellor's Department.
- Rita Bird, Head Housemaid, House of Lords.
- Elaine Lilian Birtwistle, Local Officer 2, Department of Social Security.
- Hazel Patricia Bishop. For services to The Pony Club.
- Joan Bishop, lately Administrative Officer, Department for Education and Employment.
- John William Bishop, Operational Fire Officer and Non-Operational Station Officer, London Fire and Civil Defence Authority. For services to the Fire Service.
- Alexander Blair, lately Vice-Chairman, Kelso Community Council. For services to the community in Roxburghshire.
- Brian Robert Blake. For services to VE Day Commemorations.
- Hazel Boardman, HIV Prevention Co-ordinator, Blackpool, Lancashire. For services to Health Care.
- Alan David Boland, Manager, Health and Safety, British Steel. For services to Health and Safety in the Steel Industry.
- Elizabeth Margaret Bomphray, Divisional Public Relations Manager, WRVS Scotland. For services to the community.
- Annette Laraine Booth. For services to the community in Froyle, Hampshire.
- Maureen Anne Booth, Senior Scientist, Royal Commission on Environmental Pollution. For services to Science.
- Margaret Rennie Webb-Bowen. For services to the WRVS in Edinburgh.
- Sarah Bardsley Bracher. For services to the Friends of Kent Churches.
- Susan Brailsford. For charitable services to the community in Nottinghamshire.
- Paul Thomas Clifford Brenham. For services to Scouting.
- Gladys Briggs, Chairman, Management Committee, Sea Cadet Corps, Keighley.
- Lincoln Patrick Briggs, Retail Manager's Assistant, Thames Trains, British Railways. For services to the Railway Industry.
- Raymond Philip Briggs. For services to Social Work in Leicestershire.
- Ernest Charles (Gus) Britton, Researcher, Royal Navy Submarine Museum, Gosport.
- Flora Paris Brodie, lately Charge Nurse, Acute Medical Ward, St John's Hospital, Livingston, West Lothian. For services to Health Care.
- Iris Margaret Brookes, Honorary Secretary, Cannock and Burntwood Branch, Royal National Lifeboat Institution. For services to the RNLI and to the local community.
- William Brown. For services to Fisheries Management and Conservation in Scotland.
- Oriel Elizabeth Brownjohn, Personal Secretary, Ministry of Defence.
- Beryl Simpson Bruce, Support Grade II, Her Majesty's Prison Featherstone.
- Stephen Anthony Brunt. For services to Sport for People with Disabilities.
- Norman Cuthbert Bryning. For services to the community in Northallerton, North Yorkshire.
- Alan Buckingham, Force Statistics Officer and Special Constable, Thames Valley Police. For services to the Police.
- Joan Bullock. For services to Economic Regeneration.
- John William Burgess, Member, Sheringham Lifeboat Station Branch Committee, Royal National Lifeboat Institution. For services to the RNLI.
- Cyril Burke, Health Care Assistant Trainee, Maudsley Hospital, London. For services to Health Care.
- Lyn Rosemarie Burke, Assistant Manager, Chamber of Shipping. For services to the VE/VJ Day Commemorations.
- Edwin Burrows, lately Member, Wycombe District Council. For services to Local Government.
- Eileen Esther Bush, Vice-President and Trustee, British Red Cross Society, Greater Manchester.
- Charles Henry Byatt. For charitable services to the community in High Wycombe, Buckinghamshire.
- Irene Cameron. For services to St Julian's High School, Gwent.
- John Cameron, Industrial Foreman, Department of the Environment.
- John Murdoch Cameron. For services to the Boys' Brigade in Dumbartonshire.
- Robert Sutherland Campbell. For charitable services.
- Sheila Bennett Leslie Cant. For services to Mentally Handicapped People in Renfrew.
- Charles James Carey. For services to the Life Saving Society in Essex.
- Gordon Wilson Carmichael, lately Chief Superintendent, Strathclyde Police. For services to the Police.
- Cecil Carson. For services to the Police.
- Ian Caskie, Area Controller, Glasgow South, Strathclyde Water. For services to the Water Industry.
- Thomas Cassidy. For services to the community in Uddingston, Lanarkshire.
- Darminder Singh Chadha, Principal Water Resources Planner, Dales Area, Northumbria and Yorkshire Region, National Rivers Authority. For services to the Water Industry.
- Alan Chandler, lately Director General, UK Provision Trade Federation. For services to Food Traders.
- Juliet Mary Chaplin, Branch Support Officer, Soldiers', Sailors' and Airmen's Families Association.
- June Irene Charlick. For services to Hospital Play Services.
- Arthur William Chase. For services to the community in Lechlade, Gloucestershire.
- Violet Gwendoline Chater, School Crossing Patrol, Bedfordshire County Council. For Services to Road Safety.
- Keith Bamkin Chell, TD. For political service.
- Ah Soo Chen. For services to Community Relations in North East England.
- John Morrison Childs, DL, lately Chairman, Great Ouse Local Flood Defence Committee. For services to Flood Defence in East Anglia.
- Rory Chisholm, Production Manager, Harrier II, British Aerospace Defence Ltd. For services to the Defence Industry.
- Jean Clark. For charitable services to the Legal Profession.
- Sheila Lesley Clarke. For political service.
- Edward Cleary. For services to the Rehabilitation of Offenders.
- Jan J. Clements. For services to the Northern Children's Book Festival.
- Charles Walton Richard Rumney Coard, Treasurer and Caseworker, Soldiers', Sailors' and Airmen's Families Association, Castle Morpeth, Northumberland.
- Edna Diana Cole. For services to Young People in Newhaven, East Sussex.
- Erica Ann Cole, Chief Librarian, Kemsing Village Library, Kent. For services to Librarianship.
- Frederick Stanley Cole. For services to Young People in Newhaven, East Sussex.
- Catherine Condon, Support Grade I, Department of the Environment.
- Thomas Connolly, Field Engineer. For humanitarian services in the former Yugoslavia.
- Ronald Cook, lately Regional Manager North, Industrial and Wholesale Division, Esso Petroleum Company Ltd. For services to the Oil Industry.
- Brigid Cooper, Warden, Ryefield Sheltered Accommodation for the Elderly, Lancashire. For services to Elderly People.
- Maire Cooper. For services to Homeless People in London.
- Barbara Lesley Copestake. For services to the Magistracy.
- Gladice Beatrice Copping. For services to the community in Sherborne, Dorset.
- Mary Baron Coppock. For services to the War Pensions Welfare Service.
- Nicolas de Bazille Corbin. For services to Church Conservation in Norfolk.
- John Craigie Corsie, Blacksmith. For services to the Agricultural Community in Orkney.
- Ruth Elizabeth Gertrude Cranfield. For services to the Magistracy and to Victim Support in County Durham.
- Ruth Wishart Cribbes, Auxiliary, Middlemuir School, Lenzie. For services to Special Education.
- Caroline Florence Crimp. For services to the Association for the Welfare of Children in Hospital.
- Major Robert Henry Gun Cuninghame, lately Retired Officer 2, Ministry of Defence.
- Ita Cymerman, Director, Agudas Israel Housing Association. For services to Housing.
- Gurdev Singh Dahele, Higher Executive Officer, Department for Education and Employment.
- William John Davies. For services to the Garngoch and Gorseinon Hospitals League of Friends, West Glamorgan.
- Derek Arthur Dean, Head Porter, University of Leeds. For services to Education.
- Peter Robert Dee. For services to the community in Rye, East Sussex.
- Kathryn Susan Delpak, Unit Superintendent Physiotherapist, Gwent Community NHS Trust. For services to Physiotherapy in Wales.
- Alice Dent, Journalist, Surrey Advertiser. For services to Journalism.
- Ronald Denver, lately Mobile Driver Assistant, West Sussex County Council Library Services. For services to the community.
- Margaret Deverell, Welfare Officer, British Red Cross Society, Bedfordshire.
- Thomas Patrick Dickinson, Driver and Operator, Cleanaway. For services to the Waste Management Industry.
- Eric William Dixon, lately Member, Scarborough Borough Council. For services to Local Government.
- Joyce Mary Elson Dixon, lately Member, Rushcliffe Borough Council. For services to Local Government.
- The Honourable Karen Dixon. For services to Equestrianism.
- Michael Spencer Hardisty Dobson, lately Principal Community Education Officer, North Yorkshire Local Education Authority. For services to Young People.
- Kenneth Douglas, Principal Prison Officer, Her Majesty's Prison Stafford.
- James Edward Drew, Member, Tipton City Challenge Partnership Board. For services to Urban Regeneration.
- Dominica Duffy, Deputy Manager (Refectory), Blackpool and The Fylde College. For services to Education.
- Francis Patrick Dunne. For services to the community.
- Rose Dunnigan, Volunteer Diversional and Social Therapist, Vale of Leven District General Hospital. For services to Health Care in Dunbartonshire.
- Shirley Elizabeth Dyer. For services to Swimming.
- Stuart Edmond, lately Chairman, Management Committee, Sea Cadet Corps, Inverness.
- Diana Margery Edwards, Senior Executive Officer, Ministry of Defence.
- Donald Edwards. For services to the Gwent Victim Support Scheme.
- Jonathan David Edwards. For services to Athletics.
- Ronald Edward Endean, lately Higher Executive Officer, Ministry of Agriculture, Fisheries and Food.
- Richard James English. For political service.
- Arthur Harry John Eplett. For services to the community in Fowey, Cornwall.
- Margaret Ervine. For services to Agriculture.
- Charles Fear, Voluntary Observer, Meteorological Office, Wells, Somerset.
- Jessie Helen Ferguson. For services to the Wigtownshire Rugby Football Club, Stranraer.
- Margaret Ferguson. For political service.
- Moira Ferguson, lately National Executive Officer, Scottish Pre-School Play Association. For services to the Playgroup Movement.
- Ian Hamilton Findlay, lately Site Manager, Upper Teesdale National Nature Reserve. For services to Nature Conservation.
- David James Firmstone, Senior Art Adviser, Cheshire County Council. For services to Art Education.
- Kevin Fisher, Sub Officer (Retained), West Yorkshire Fire and Civil Defence Authority. For services to the Fire Service.
- Jim Fisk, Clematis Breeder and Grower. For services to Horticulture.
- Dilys Fletcher, Chair, Higginshaw Village Estate Management Board, Oldham, Lancashire. For services to the community.
- John Fletcher, lately Higher Executive Officer, Department of Social Security.
- Robert Dowler Kingsley Foster. For services to the Police.
- Ruth Winston-Fox. For services to the community in Enfield, London.
- Keith Frederick Frampton, Light Plater, Vosper Thornycroft (UK) Ltd. For services to the Shipbuilding Industry.
- Donald Fraser, Engineer, Skye Bridge. For services to Transport in Scotland.
- John Alexander Fraser, lately Retained Sub-Officer, Highland and Islands Fire Brigade. For services to the Fire Service.
- Elizabeth Winn Freeman. For services to the community in Richmond, North Yorkshire.
- Frank Frith, lately Production Director, British Rail Maintenance Ltd/Level 5 Group. For services to the Railway Industry.
- Edith Frodsham, Senior Executive Officer, Department for Education and Employment.
- David Harold Arthur Fry, lately Production Manager (Wastewater) Essex, Anglian Water. For services to the Water Industry.
- Moira Gallagher. For services to Athletics for People with Disabilities.
- Natalie Jean Gallagher, Support Manager III, Ministry of Defence.
- William Henry Francis Geer, lately Senior Executive Officer, Department for Education and Employment.
- Sheila Hart Geraghty, lately Administrator, Student Affairs, Lincoln's Inn. For services to Legal Training.
- William David Gibb, lately Managing Director, Clyde Marine Training. For services to Nautical Training.
- John Arthur Gibson. For services to the community in Rochford, Essex.
- Kevin Gilbride. For services to Education.
- John Joseph Gill, Hydrometric Officer, Thames Region, National Rivers Authority. For services to the Water Industry.
- Ronald Geoffrey Gilligan, Higher Class Operator, Colburn Waste Water Treatment Works, Yorkshire Water. For services to the Water Industry.
- Ann Gleed. For services to the community, particularly The Prince of Wales Hospice, in West Yorkshire.
- Jacqueline Elizabeth Glennon, Palantypist, Merseyside Police. For services to the Police.
- Susan Elizabeth Goble, lately Support Grade I, Her Majesty's Treasury.
- Maisie Goldstone. For charitable services to the Friends of the Welsh National Opera, Swansea and West Wales.
- Julie Goodyear, Actress. For services to Television Drama.
- Victor Salvador Gower. For services to Tourism in London.
- David Ian Grant, Veterinary Director, RSPCA Harmsworth Hospital. For services to Animal Welfare.
- Donald Currie Grant, Artist. For charitable services to Animal Welfare Worldwide.
- John Robert Green, Member, War Pensions Committee in East Anglia.
- Maynard Green. For services to the community, in Daventry, Northamptonshire.
- Sheila Margaret Greenfield, lately Headteacher, Townsend Church of England School, St Albans, Hertfordshire. For services to Education.
- Ronald Geoffrey Greenland, Specialist Fire Officer, United Bristol Hospitals NHS Trust. For services to Fire Safety.
- David Alfred Gregg. For services to Road Safety.
- Arthur Harold Griffin, Journalist and Author. For services to Literature and to the Lake District.
- Kay Jeanette Gwyneth Griffiths. For services to Young People and to the community in Llantwit Major, South Glamorgan.
- Laura Elsie Groom. For services to the Goodmayes Hospital, Essex.
- Eveline Gunn, Messing. Store Manager, NAAFI. For services to the NAAFI.
- Betty Violet Cunningham, lately Matron, King Edward VII Hospital, Guernsey. For services to Health Care.
- Sheila Rosemarie Hale. For political service.
- Maureen Hall, Secretary to the Chairman and Chief Executive, Scottish & Newcastle plc. For services to the Brewing Industry.
- Ronald Hamill. For services to the Railway Industry.
- Agnew Hamilton. For services to the community.
- Margaret Elizabeth Hammond, lately Social Security Officer 2B, Social Security Agency, Department of Health and Social Services.
- Eileen Lilian Hance. For services to the community in Chelmsford, Essex.
- Edwin Showier Hannath, National Secretary Normandy Veterans' Association. For services to the VE/VJ Day Commemorations.
- Daisy Margaret Hanshaw, Chairman, League of Friends, Highlands Hospital, London. For services to the community.
- Audrey Kathleen Hardcastle, Revenue Officer, Her Majesty's Board of Inland Revenue.
- Elizabeth Anne Harding, lately Administrative Officer, Ministry of Defence.
- John Frewen Harman, Council Member, Western Division, Institute of Advanced Motorists. For services to Road Safety.
- Frances Ann Harper, Revenue Executive, Her Majesty's Board of Inland Revenue.
- Margaret Anne Harries. For services to the Whitchurch Youth Club, Cardiff.
- Clifford Stanley Harrington, Chairman and Trustee, National Reye's Syndrome Foundation UK. For services to Health Care.
- Thomas Paul Harris. For services to the community and to Christian Aid in Silsoe, Bedford.
- Albert William Frank Hartnell. For services to the community in Dawlish, Devon.
- Alexander Hastie, Fish Merchant. For services to the Fishing Industry, and to the community in Tyne and Wear.
- Cecil Robert Hawker, Director, Safety and Environment, Exploration and Production, British Gas plc. For services to the Gas Industry.
- Peter James Ferrer Hawkins, Field Director, Save the Children, Angola. For humanitarian services in Angola.
- Mary Florence Hawley For charitable services to the community in Sheffield, South Yorkshire.
- Agnes Hay, Administrative Officer, Companies House Agency, Department of Trade and Industry.
- David William Head, Senior Professional and Technology Officer, Ministry of Defence.
- Lawrence Edward Heard, Postman, Macclesfield. For services to the Post Office and to the community in Macclesfield.
- Lieutenant Colonel (Rtd) Donald Knox Helm, TD, Co-ordinator, Lowland Employers' Liaison Committee, Territorial Auxiliary and Volunteer Reserve Association.
- Agnes Wilson Henderson. For services to the Citizens' Advice Bureau, Airdrie.
- James Gunn Henderson, Editor, Northern Times, Golspie, Sutherland. For services to Journalism.
- Yvonne Elizabeth Henshaw, Headteacher, Canonbury Junior School, Islington, London. For services to Education.
- Mary Catherine Herman, Administrative Officer, Ministry of Defence.
- Derek William Heron, Training Officer, VSEL. For services to Training and to the Defence Industry.
- Frederick John Hewitt, Vice-President, St John Ambulance Brigade, Dover.
- Patricia Walley Hiatt, lately Executive Officer, Central Statistical Office.
- Keith William Hickson, lately General Medical Practitioner, Walsall, West Midlands. For services to Medicine.
- Dennis William Higgtns, Pharmacist. For services to the community in Surbiton, Surrey.
- William Higgs, Secretary, Scottish Prison Service Trade Union Side.
- Sezar Atta Hikmet, lately Medical Officer, Immigration Detention Centre, Harmondsworth.
- Henry John Hill. For services to the community in Melton Mowbray, Leicestershire.
- Margaret Armoral Jean Hill. For voluntary services to the community in St Albans, Hertfordshire.
- Thomas Hudson Hillocks, Specialist Painter and Decorator. For services to Conservation in North East Scotland.
- Robert Neville Hinsley, lately Judge's Clerk, Lord Chancellor's Department.
- Elizabeth May Hobbins, Administrative Officer, Ministry of Defence.
- Christopher Michael Hobson, Senior Librarian, Ministry of Defence.
- Margaret Elizabeth Hoey, Typist, Lord Chancellor's Department.
- Susan Christine Hogg. For services to Guiding.
- George Richard Holkham, Brigade Field Officer, Boys' Brigade, East Sussex. For services to Young People.
- Louise Mary Honeyman, lately Executive Director, London Mozart Players. For services to Music.
- Eveline Horwood. For services to Health and Safety in the Printing Industry.
- Denis Ralph Howard, Founder and Secretary, the Yacht Charter Association. For services to Yachting and to Safety at Sea.
- Robert Edward James Howes, Forest Officer III, Forestry Commission.
- Alan Douglas Hudson, Director of ETSI Programmes, Motorola Ltd. For services to the Mobile Radio Industry.
- Alan Keith Huggins. For services to the British Philatelic Trust.
- Dolores Joan Hughes. For services to the community of Cwm, Ebbw Vale, Gwent.
- Ronald Hulse, County Treasurer, The Royal British Legion, Cheshire.
- Gillian Hush, lately Producer Features, BBC Radio. For services to Radio Broadcasting.
- James Ralph Woollard Hyde. For services to Canterbury Cathedral.
- Jean Gabriel Hynard, Chair, Layham Parish Council, Ipswich, Suffolk. For services to Local Government.
- David Brown Hyslop, lately Leading Mechanical and Electrical Engineer, Scottish Office.
- Kenneth Michael Igglesden, President, Royal Air Forces Association, Bexhill-on-Sea, East Sussex.
- Peter Iles. For services to Industry in Wales.
- Jean Aileen Jackson. For services to the community in Bramshott and Liphook, Hampshire.
- Joy Elizabeth Jackson. For services to the St John Ambulance Brigade.
- Norman Leslie Jagger, Chairman, Arthritis and Rheumatism Research Council, Troon. For services to the community in Ayrshire.
- Esther Moyra James. For services to the community in Swindon, Wiltshire.
- Walter Jeffcoat. For charitable services to the community in Kettering, Northamptonshire.
- Jeremiah George Jessup. For charitable services to the community in Norfolk.
- Malcolm Jevons. For political and public service.
- Christina Boyd Johnson, lately Senior Executive Officer, Overseas Development Administration.
- Edward Austen Johnson. For services to the community in Huddersfield, West Yorkshire.
- Lilian Dinah Johnson. For services to the community in Hertfordshire.
- Pamela Emily Johnson, Lacemaker. For services to Lace Making.
- Tina Marie Johnson, Administrative Officer, Her Majesty's Board of Customs and Excise.
- Annie Eileen Jones. For services to Elderly People in Woolston, Cheshire.
- Barry Terence Jones, Detective Constable, Metropolitan Police, For services to the Police.
- Deiniol Gerald Clive Jones, Revenue Executive, Her Majesty's Board of Inland Revenue.
- Edith Agnes Jones. For services to Shaw County Primary School, South Ockendon, Essex.
- Glynne Jones, Musical Director, Pendyrus Male Choir. For services to Music.
- Graham William Jones, Live Line Engineer, the National Grid Company plc. For services to the Electricity Industry.
- Lyndon Ivor Jones. For charitable services in Wales.
- Pauline Verna Jones, Founder Member, Wolverhampton Cancer Research Players. For services to the Cancer Research Campaign.
- Robert Nicholas Jones. For services to Rugby Union Football.
- Roderick Charles Jones, Senior Executive Officer, Ministry of Defence.
- Kay Elizabeth Jordan, Co-ordinator, Spitalfields Small Business Association. For services to Economic Regeneration.
- Peter Bernard Jordan, Senior Teacher and Director of Studies, Light Hall School, Solihull. For services to Education.
- Kathleen Patricia Judge, Administrative Officer, Central Office of Information.
- William Hubert Higman Julian. For services to Music in Cornwall.
- Talivaldis Kalnars. For services to Forestry.
- Mohammad Abdul Karim, Local Officer 2, Department of Social Security.
- Cecil George Norman Kavanagh. For services to the National Schizophrenia Fellowship.
- Alfred William Kelly. For services to the community in Watford, Hertfordshire.
- Captain Charles Reginald Kelso. For services to the Shipping Industry.
- Derek Howard Kemp, lately Executive Officer, Health and Safety Executive, Department of the Environment.
- Ruby Kennaugh, Civil Defence Volunteer, Isle of Man. For services to Civil Defence.
- Mary Geraldine Kerr, Support Manager III, Department of Trade and Industry.
- Nella Kerr. For services to The Council for Music in Hospitals.
- Katharine Rose Kershaw, Environmental Consultant to Eurotunnel. For services to the Channel Tunnel Project and to the Environment.
- Catherine Kerss. For political and public service.
- Jagan Nath Kharbanda, Community Liaison Officer, London Borough of Croydon and Croydon College. For services to Community Relations.
- Gwenllian Anne Kidd, WRVS County Organiser, Dyfed.
- Jean Buyers Kidd, lately Musical Director, Royal Scottish National Orchestra Junior Chorus. For services to Musical Education.
- Elizabeth Smith King, Local Officer 1, Department of Social Security.
- Iain Donald King, Project Manager, Security, British Railways Board. For services to the Railway Industry.
- Roy Kirkpatrick, lately Safety Officer, ICI Films, Imperial Chemical Industries plc. For services to Industrial Relations.
- Dorothy Julia Knight, Chemist, Institute of Food Research. For services to Science.
- Robert Knights, Constable, 2 Area, Metropolitan Police. For service to the Police.
- May Lalkhan, Support Manager III, Department for Education and Employment.
- Margery Ethel Lambert. For services to the community in East Meon, Hampshire.
- Albert George Lancaster. For services to the community.
- William Landles. For services to Literature in the Borders.
- Josephine Carmen Fay Langton. For political and public service.
- Edith Mary Laurie. For services to the community in Perth, Kinross.
- Faith Clokie Lawson, Chairman, the Pedestrians' Association. For services to Road Safety and the Environment.
- Elaine Vera Laycock, General Medical Practitioner, Ruislip, Middlesex. For services to Medicine.
- Valerie Gresty Laycock, Administrative Officer, Ministry of Defence.
- Winifred (Betty) Laysell. For services to Voluntary Services Overseas.
- William Le Breton. For political service.
- Ann Patricia Leck. For services to Relate.
- Carl Derek Campbell Earl Leckey, lately Leading Lockkeeper, British Waterways Board. For services to British Waterways.
- Arthur Ledgard. For services to Disabled Motorists.
- Michael Leslie Ewart Lee, Leading Observer, Royal Observer Corps, RAF Bentley Priory.
- Janet Leece, Police Sergeant, Isle of Man Constabulary. For services to the Police.
- David Alan Lees, Senior Professional Technology Officer, Vehicle Inspectorate Executive Agency, Department of Transport.
- Gordon Lemon, Divisional Technical Manager, RMC Roadstone Products Ltd. For services to the Construction Industry.
- William Pritchard Lewis. For services to the community and to Welsh Amateur Music.
- The Reverend John Leonard Lines. For services to Homeless People in Whitechapel, London.
- Ronald D. Little. For services to the community in Bratton, Wiltshire.
- Shirley Lloyd, Managing Director, P. E. Thomas Ltd, Porthcawl, Mid-Glamorgan. For services to Industry in Wales.
- Gordon Henry Loach, Subpostmaster, Bridgnorth, Shropshire. For services to the Post Office and to the community in Bridgnorth.
- Louisa Mary Loder. For services to the community in Shrewsbury, Shropshire.
- Audrey Jean Lootes. For services to the Fire Service College.
- Horace Lord, lately Process Worker, Fuel Division, British Nuclear Fuels Ltd. For services to the Nuclear Industry.
- Edwin Charles Ernest Lowe. For services to Broadcasting and to Snooker.
- Elizabeth Ann Lowe. For services to the community in Pendleton, Lancashire.
- Dolly Luckock, Volunteer Shop Manager, Oxfam, Tavistock, Devon. For charitable services.
- Alan Frederick Lyons, Head of Nursing, Broadgreen NHS Trust, Liverpool. For services to Health Care.
- Ivorine Delores MacDonald, Executive Officer, Her Majesty's Board of Customs and Excise.
- Donald MacKenzie, Farm Manager. For services to Agriculture in Argyllshire.
- John Fairley Grant Macaulay, Constable, Lothian and Borders Police. For services to the Police.
- Brian Mack. For services to Telescope Design.
- Georgina Macleod Mackenzie, Professional and Management Grade 3, Dounreay Decommissioning Contractors Department, UKAEA. For services to the Nuclear Industry.
- Patrick Carroll Macnamara, Chairman, Queen Mary's Roehampton Trust. For services to Disabled ex-Servicemen and Women.
- Dorothy Amy Madeley. For services to the community in Mildenhall, Suffolk.
- Faridoon Madon, lately Chairman, Greater London Action for Racial Equality (GLARE).
- William Patrick Magill. For services to the Glazing Industry.
- Claude Anthony Maginess. For service to the Telecommunications Industry.
- Frances Rose Mailer, Principal's Secretary, Glenrothes College, Fife. For services to Education.
- Winifred Elizabeth Ann Main. For services to Cancer Support in Aberdeen and North East Scotland.
- Patrick Maloney. For services to the community in Blackwood, Gwent.
- Vivian Mannell, Local Officer 1, Department of Social Security.
- Alice Marlow, School Crossing Patrol, Leicestershire County Council. For services to Road Safety.
- Cyril Martin. For services to Ludlow Hospital, Shropshire.
- Dorothy Ann Martin, Higher Executive Officer, Department for Education and Employment.
- Dorothy Iris Martin. For services to the National Trust in Sussex.
- Haydn Martin, Divisional Commandant, Special Constabulary, Derbyshire. For services to the Police.
- Susan Martineau. For services to the Citizens' Advice Bureau in Exmouth, Devon.
- Anthony Arthur James Mason, lately Personal Secretary, Department of the Environment.
- Kathleen Rose Mason, Personal Secretary, Ministry of Defence.
- Penelope Maitland Mason. For political and public service.
- Ralph Blair Mason, Warden, Woodlands Camp, Birmingham Boys' and Girls' Union. For services to Young People.
- Rita Matcham, Member, Royal British Legion, Women's Section, Canterbury.
- James Mathieson, Officer in Charge, Her Majesty's Board of Inland Revenue.
- Denis Matthews, Managing Director, Mathbirk Ltd. For services to the Textile Machinery Industry.
- Margaret Maxwell. For services to Architecture.
- Kathleen Elizabeth Mayo, lately Assistant Librarian, Atherstone Library, Warwickshire. For services to Librarianship.
- Doreeh Maytom, lately Senior Personal Secretary, Her Majesty's Treasury.
- Janet Cameron McCabe, Principal Pharmacist in Drug Information, Glasgow Royal Infirmary. For services to Health Care.
- David McCallum, Director of Access and Learner Services, Motherwell College. For services to Education.
- Priscilla Cornwallis McCausland, Secretary, Medical Commission on Accident Prevention. For services to Motoring and to Road Safety.
- James Hamilton McColl. For services to Horticulture.
- Norma McConville. For services to Housing.
- Mary Barbara McDermott, For services to the community in Portsmouth, Hampshire.
- Isabella Crawford McDowell. For services to the community.
- Daphne June McGlashan, lately Typist, Cabinet Office.
- Jean Watson McGlashan, Head Night Porter, Buchanan Arms Hotel, Drymen, Dunbartonshire. For services to the Hotel Industry.
- Michael Leo McGoldrick. For services to the Police.
- Catriona Orr McInnes, Principal Teacher, Computing Studies, Boroughmuir High School, Edinburgh. For services to Education.
- Shirley Janet McIntosh. For services to Shooting.
- Rosemary Buchanan McIntyre. For services to the British Red Cross Society.
- Neil McKechnie, Member, Ross and Cromarty District Council. For services to the community in Ross-shire.
- Neville Desmond McKee. For services to Nature Conservation.
- Robert Mervyn McKeown. For services to the British Red Cross Society.
- Alice Miller McLaren. For political and public service.
- Norman Francis McLarnon. For services to the Telecommunications Industry.
- Andrew McLelland. For services to the community in Castlemilk, Glasgow.
- Peter McNally, Senior Executive Officer, Department of Health.
- Grahani McSweeney, Honorary Secretary, League of Friends, Halton General Hospital, Runcorn, Cheshire. For services to the community.
- Jean McVitty. For services to the community, particularly to Tourism.
- Satish Chander Mehta, General Medical Practitioner, Cheshire. For services to Medicine.
- Oliver Norman Menhinick, Head of Horticulture, Lackham College, Wiltshire. For services to Horticulture Education.
- Alexander Peter Menzies, Section Supervisor, Cumbria Special Constabulary. For services to the Police.
- Jeffrey Martin Middlecote. For services to the Royal Observatories.
- William Harold Millar, lately Higher Executive Officer, Home Office.
- Colin Michael Millington, Key Packer, Premier Beverages. For services to the Food Industry.
- William Mills, Watch Officer, the Coastguard Agency, Department of Transport.
- William Frederick John Minns. For services to the community in Sparsholt, Winchester.
- Robert Moodie. For political service.
- Elizabeth Brenda Moore, lately Administrative Officer, Department of Social Security.
- Frank Charles Morgan. For services to the community in Williton District, Taunton, Somerset.
- Peter Gerard Morgan, Chairman, Management Committee, Hertford Citizens' Advice Bureau. For services to Consumer Protection.
- Terence Graham Morley, Sub-Officer (Retained), Gloucestershire Fire and Rescue Service. For services to the Fire Service.
- Barry Frederic Morris. For services to Tourism in Blackpool, Lancashire.
- Peter Jackson Mortimer, TD, Assistant Chief Probation Officer, Suffolk Probation Service, For services to the Probation Service.
- Alan Frederick Mount, Clerk of Works/Stone Mason, Magdalen College, University of Oxford. For services to Conservation.
- Charmaine Moverley, lately Higher Executive Officer, Ministry of Defence.
- William George Mowat. For services to the community in Caithness.
- Jessie Muiry, Social Work Assistant, Grampian Regional Council, Moray Division. For services to Social Work.
- Robert Ivan Mumford, lately Chairman, Dial-a-Ride, South Bedfordshire. For services to the Mobility of Disabled People.
- Mary Kathleen Murby, Secretary, UN Association, Church Stretton, Shropshire.
- Hazel Murphy, Member, War Pensions Committee, Glamorgan and Gwent and Secretary, War Widows Association of Great Britain.
- Sean Brendan Murphy, Headteacher, Our Lady of Lourdes Roman Catholic Primary School, Stonebridge, Brent, Middlesex. For services to Education.
- Annie Eliza Musk. For services to the Thanet Healthcare Trust, Kent.
- Christopher Robert Musson, Aerial Investigator, Royal Commission on the Ancient and Historical Monuments of Wales.
- Horace Myers, lately Clerk, Sacriston Parish Council, Co. Durham. For services to Local Government.
- Clara Nahon. For services to the Spanish and Portuguese Synagogue, London.
- Diana Rosemary Needham, Officer in Charge, Mother and Baby Unit, Browning House, Leeds. For services to Health Care.
- Ivy Needham. For services to the Maxwell Pensioners.
- Douglas Arthur Nevard, Head Government Butler, Government Hospitality Fund, Foreign and Commonwealth Office.
- Jill Newell, Senior Assistant Librarian, University of London. For services to Higher Education.
- Peter Newman. For charitable services in Kent.
- Gerald Roy Newton. For services to the community in Rishton, Lancashire.
- Harold John Nickson, Trade Union Change Representative, Babcock Thorn Ltd. For services to Industrial Relations.
- Alan Ernest Nicoll, lately Immigration Officer, Home Office and for Charitable services in Bangladesh.
- Andrew Aitken Nisbet Member, Kilmarnock and Loudoun District Council. For services to Local Government.
- Maureen Edna Noble, Typist, Metropolitan Police. For services to the Police.
- Gulam Kaderbhoy Noon, Chairman and Managing Director, Noon Products plc. For services to the Food Industry.
- Frances Joy Norfield, Administrative Assistant, Home Office.
- Francis George Norman, Warden, St James's Hostel, Jersey. For services to the community.
- Robert Alfred O'Bee, lately Member, Basingstoke and Deane Borough Council. For services to Local Government.
- William Gerard O'Hara, Court Officer, Scottish Office.
- John Oliver. For services to Young People.
- Eric Oxley. For services to the Nuclear Industry.
- Desmond John Palmer, Administrator, Allied Dunbar Assurance Company's Charitable Trust. For charitable services.
- Kenneth Charles Parminter. For services to Young People in West Sussex.
- Edward Thomas Pascoe. For services to the community in Sutton, Surrey.
- Jean Bower Pateman. For services to the Conservation of Highgate Cemetery, London.
- Alexander Paton, Secretary, Glasgow Council of Tenants' Association.
- Laurence Richard Paton, Chairman, Guide Dogs for the Blind in Formby, Crosby and Ormskirk, Merseyside. For services to Blind People.
- Professor Roland Arthur Paxton. For services to Engineering History.
- Derek Arthur Payne. For services to the Magistracy.
- Philip Andrew James Payne, Senior Professional and Technology Officer, Department of the Environment.
- Barry Victor Pegram, Chief Airworthiness Engineer, BAe (Farnborough). For services to the Defence Industry.
- Michael George Penman, Occupational Health, ICI Chemicals and Polymers Limited, Teesside. For services to Environmental Safety.
- Ann Elizabeth Percival, Superintendent Physiotherapist, Harefield Hospital, Middlesex. For services to Health Care.
- Gaynor Phillips. For political service.
- Margaret Phillips, School Crossing Patrol, Knowsley Metropolitan Borough Council. For services to Road Safety.
- David Patrick Philpot. For services to the community in Porthcawl, Mid-Glamorgan.
- Michael Stanley Pike. For services to the community in Stockcross, Berkshire.
- Jean Pinder, WRVS Organiser, Dewsbury and District Hospital, West Yorkshire. For services to the community.
- John Frederick Pirie. For humanitarian services in Eastern Europe.
- Leslie Pitchfork, Detective Constable, West Yorkshire Police. For service to the Police.
- Catherine Plater. For services to Cystic Fibrosis Research.
- Raymond Arthur Pobgee, Chairman, Peterborough Victim Support Scheme. For services to Victims of Crime.
- James Howard Pope. For political service.
- Joseph Porteous. For services to Children's Panels and to the Ayrshire Council on Alcohol.
- Norman Frederick Potter, Chairman, Norwich Crime Prevention and Crimestoppers Committee, Norfolk Constabulary. For services to the community in Norfolk.
- Gwynna Harvey Powell. For services to the community in Anglesey.
- Mary Joan Power. For services to the Arts in Bristol.
- Anne Barbara Prasad, Editor, British National Formulary. For services to the Medical and Pharmacy Professions.
- David William Prebble, Higher Executive Officer, Metropolitan Police. For services to the Police.
- Huw Pritchard, Investigation Manager, Her Majesty's Board of Inland Revenue.
- Eryl Pugh. Caretaker, Churchstoke County Primary School, Powys. For services to Education.
- John Whitfield Pugh. For services to the Porthywaen Silver Band, Oswestry, Shropshire.
- Constance Mary Pye. For services to the community in Burnley, Lancashire.
- Percy Quarry. For services to Scouting and to the community in Rotherham, South Yorkshire.
- Henry George Quinn. For services to Victim Support.
- Dennis Radford, Groundsman, Exeter Cathedral. For services to Tourism in Exeter, Devon.
- Captain John Edward Ramsdale, Head of Flight Operations (Helicopters), Civil Aviation Authority. For services to Aviation.
- Anthony John Heath Ray, BEM, Instructional Officer 1, Royal Naval Engineering College, Ministry of Defence.
- Dorothy June Redfern. For services to the community in Tedburn St Mary, Devon.
- Edgar Wolston Bertram Hardsley Milne-Redhead, ISO, TD. For services to Nature Conservation.
- Agnes Reed, lately Cook, Northumberland Fire and Rescue Service. For services to the Fire Service.
- Elizabeth Ballantine Rennie. For services to Archaeology in Argyll.
- Dean Richards. For services to Rugby Union Football.
- Sylvia Violet Rickard. For services to the community in Mawnan Smith, Cornwall.
- Eric William Ridehalgh, lately Secretary, Scottish Licensed Trade Association. For services to the Licensed Trade.
- Marlene Wilson Riekie, Typist, Ministry of Defence.
- J. Hugh A. Roberts, Leader, Islwyn Borough Council. For services to Local Government in Wales.
- Peter Roberts. For services to Engineering Education.
- Elizabeth Robertson. For political and public service.
- Anne Gwendoline Robinson. For services to the community in Gwynedd.
- Jill Kathleen Robinson. For services to community in Leeds, West Yorkshire.
- Paul Robinson, Force Co-ordinator, Special Constabulary, Merseyside Police. For services to the Police.
- James Henry Rogers, Logistics Officer. For humanitarian services, particularly in Rwanda.
- Margaret Rogers. For services to the community in Thornhill, near Egremont, Cumbria.
- Peter Roper. For services to the community in Braintree, Essex.
- Kenneth Edwin Rose, General Manager, Chief and Assistant Chief Fire Officers' Association. For services to the Fire Service.
- Ian James Rush. For services to Association Football.
- Graham Russell, Chairman, Preston Candover and Nutley Parish Council, Hampshire. For services to the community.
- Janet Mary Ryan. For services to the League of Friends, St Michael's Hospital, Hayle, Cornwall.
- Anselm Samuel, Member, Executive Committee of Hackney Racial Equality Council. For services to Race Relations.
- Lilian Dorothy Samuel. For services to the community in Marlborough, Wiltshire.
- George Sandell, Chair, Stapleford Parish Council, Hertford. For services to Local Government.
- Sally Irene May Sanderson. For political service.
- Allan Kenneth Sands, Production Supervisor, Military Aircraft Division, BAe. For services to aircraft Industry Safety.
- John Grant Sargent, Voluntary Observer, Meteorological Office, Seaton, Devon.
- Susan Saw. For political and public service.
- Geoffrey Christopher Sayers, Station Officer (Volunteer), Cambridgeshire Fire and Rescue Service. For services to the Fire Service.
- Joan Valerie Scammell, lately Showroom Receptionist, Caradon Mira Ltd. For services to the Bathroom Fittings Industry.
- Barbara Ann Scarborough. For services to the Nchima Trust, Malawi.
- Brenda Claudine Scarr, Trustee, British Red Cross Society, Essex.
- Walter Scott. For services to Conservation in Shetland.
- Dorothy Mary Shaw. For political and public service.
- Richard Shaw. For services to Association Football in the South of Scotland.
- Gregory Augustine Michael Shepherd, Chief Clerk, Whips' Assistants Office, House of Commons.
- Margaret Sheridan, Support Grade I, Department for Education and Employment.
- Richard Brinsley Sheridan, Service Manager, Reyrolle Installation, Reyrolle Ltd. For services to the Power Generation Industry.
- Jean Mary Sherriff, Administrative Assistant, Rhuddlan District, Citizens' Advice Bureau.
- Grant Alexander Simmonds, Chief Assistant Ceremonial Officer, Corporation of London. For services to the VE Day Commemorations and to the City of London.
- Betty Simpson, Secretary and Personal Assistant to the Bishop of Coventry. For services to the Church of England.
- Isobel Singleton. For services to Local Government.
- Edwin Sloan. For services to the Hospice Movement.
- Major Patrick John Smart, Member, Huntingdonshire District Council. For services to Local Government.
- Frederick Alan Porter-Smith. For services to Sport for People with Disabilities.
- Barbara Smith, Voluntary Group Leader, St. Michael's Junior, Mixed and Infants School, Bishop's Stortford, Hertfordshire. For services to Education.
- Irene Maude Smith. For services to the community in Enfield, Middlesex.
- Iris Smith, Administrator, British Red Cross Society, Northumbria.
- John Graham Smith, Firefighter, Greater Manchester County Fire Service. For humanitarian services in Romania.
- Marion Elizabeth Smith, Support Grade I, Department of the Environment.
- Olive Mary Smith, Veterinary Nurse. For services to Veterinary Medicine.
- Ivy Olive Smy, Senior Personal Secretary, Department of Social Security.
- Sandra South. For services to the NHS and to the community in the Highlands.
- Winifred Kate Sowden. For services to the community in Southampton, Hampshire.
- Julian Erwin Spindel. For services to the Railway Industry and to Bridge Engineering.
- Eileen Spray, Cook, Mountfield and Whatlington Church of England School, East Sussex. For services to Education.
- Margaret Evelyn Stableford, School Nurse, Grays, Essex. For services to Young People.
- Professor Brian Charles Hilton Steele. For services to Materials Science.
- Charles Henry Steer, lately Gardener 1, Charge Hand, Hampton Court Palace Gardens.
- Frances Barbara Stein, Non-Executive Director, Kings Mill Centre for Health Care Services NHS Trust. For voluntary services to Health Care in Nottinghamshire.
- Robert Jeffrey Sterland, Chief Inspector, Derbyshire Constabulary. For services to the Police.
- Rabbi Kurt Stern. For services to the community in Stamford Hill, London.
- Robert David Stevens, General Secretary, Irish Council of Churches. For services to the community.
- Hilda Elizabeth Jane Stewart, Deputy World President, Associated Country Women of the World. Co-ordinator of ACWW Eastern European Leadership Development Programme for Rural Women.
- Nicholas James Stockton, Emergencies Unit Coordinator, Oxfam. For humanitarian services in Rwanda.
- Ann Stokoe, Executive Officer, Department of Social Security.
- Roger Douglas Stone. For services to the community in North London.
- Harold Fleming Stookes, Chairman, League of Friends, Queen Elizabeth Hospital, Gateshead. For services to the community.
- Alan Stott, Foreman, Refuse Collection, Harrogate Borough Council, North Yorkshire. For services to Local Government.
- Frederick Williamson Stratford, Founder, Hound Wildlife and Conservation Group, Netley Abbey, Hampshire. For services to Conservation.
- Ian Andrew Sykes, Managing Director, Nevis Range Development Company. For services to the Sports Industry.
- Stella MacQueen Sykes, Secretary, Soldiers', Sailors' and Airmen's Families Association, Lambeth.
- Mona Patricia Tait. For services to Swimming for People with Disabilities.
- Nancy Tait, Secretary, Society for the Prevention of Asbestosis and Industrial Diseases for services to Health and Safety.
- Thelma Mary Tanner, Secretary, Wirral MENCAP, Merseyside. For charitable services.
- Kathleen Taylor. For services to the community in Reigate, Surrey.
- Enid Florence Temme. For services to the community in Upton upon Severn, Worcestershire.
- Derrick Thomas, Constable, Humberside Police. For services to the Police.
- Neville Russell Thomas, lately Head, Middle East and Africa Department, Confederation of British Industry. For services to Industry.
- Thomas Glyndwr Thomas. For services to the community in Carmarthen, Dyfed.
- Arthur Eric Thompson, lately Annunciator Superintendent, House of Commons.
- Douglas Thompson, Member, OFWAT Northumbria Customer Service Committee. For services to the Water Industry.
- Jean Thompson, lately Support Grade I, Teachers Pension Agency, Department for Education and Employment.
- Ellen McKay Thomson, Local Officer 2, Department of Social Security.
- Andrew Thornton, Chairman and Managing Director, Andy Thornton Architectural Antiques Ltd. For services to Export.
- Patricia Labouchere Thornton. For services to the community in Alresford, Hampshire.
- Jean Arthur Dennis Tooke, Senior Professional and Technology Officer, Commonwealth War Graves Commission.
- Wendy Patricia Trevett, General Office Manager, West Dorset Hospital, Dorset. For services to Health Care.
- Rex Allan Frank Truscott. For services to the Royal Shakespeare Theatre, Stratford upon Avon, Warwickshire.
- William Alexander Tubman. For services to the British Red Cross Society.
- Kieran James Tucker, Training Manager, Lucas Aerospace Power Systems. For services to Training.
- Eileen Tuff. For political and public service.
- William Charles Turner, Chief Commandant, Special Constabulary, Greater Manchester Police. For services to the Police.
- Helen Welsh Tye. For services to the Whitchurch Hospital League of Friends, Cardiff.
- Gillian Anne Elizabeth Tyler, lately Senior Personal Secretary, Ministry of Defence.
- Leslie Alan Tyler, Manager, Vehicle Design, Vickers Defence Systems. For services to the Defence Industry.
- Edwin Charles Valler, Deputy Chief Security Officer, University of Surrey. For services to Education.
- Andrew Veitch, Member, Clydebank District Council. For services to the community in Clydebank.
- Thomas Peter Venters, Joint Divisional Secretary, Soldiers', Sailors' and Airmen's Families Association, Blyth and Seaton Valley, Northumberland.
- Dawn Ethel Barbara Walker, Pre Vocational Manager, Beneast Training Provider. For services to Training for Disabled People in Lancashire.
- Michael James Walker, Motorway Superintendent, Leicestershire County Council. For services to Highway Maintenance.
- Phyllis Wallbank. For services to Homeless People.
- Wing Commander Kenneth Horatio Wallis, Royal Air Force (Retd). For services to Autogyro Development.
- The Reverend Canon Brian Walshe. For services to Young People.
- Colin Wardman. For services to the community in Wetherby, West Yorkshire.
- Gladys Mary Warke, Revenue Officer, Her Majesty's Board of Inland Revenue.
- The Reverend Robert Waters, lately General Secretary, Scottish Congregational Church.
- James Harold Watkins. For services to the Herefordshire Nature Trust.
- The Reverend William James Watson. For services to Equestrianism and to the community.
- Christine Marion Watts, Secretary and Project Co-ordinator, Pembroke Street Estate Management Board, Plymouth, Devon. For services to the community.
- Leila Webster (Mrs. Mercer), Actress and Singer. For services to Entertainment.
- John Fortnum Weller, Station Warden, Royal Air Force Brawdy, Ministry of Defence.
- Rosemary Welsh. For voluntary services to Health Care in Tyneside.
- Tony West, lately Second Coxswain/Mechanic of Lytham St Annes Lifeboat, Royal National Lifeboat Institution. For services to Safety at Sea.
- David John White, General Medical Practitioner, Enfield and Haringey, London. For services to Medicine.
- William George White, lately Train Standards Manager, South West Zone (Waterloo), Railtrack. For services to the Railway Industry.
- Leon Raymond Whitmack, lately Administrative Officer, Foreign and Commonwealth Office.
- Ann Whitmee, Support Grade I, Her Majesty's Board of Customs and Excise.
- Leslie Vincent Whittle, Telephonist and Shorthand Typist, Palatine Products. For services to the Health Care Equipment Industry.
- Reginald Whitwood, Medical Centre Attendant, Coal Products Ltd, British Coal Corporation. For services to the Coal Industry.
- Robert George Whyatt. For political service.
- Joan Widera, Servery Assistant and Site Supervisor, Whitstone Primary School, Devon. For services to Education.
- Trevor Wilde. For services to the community in Blaenau, Gwent.
- Frederick Roy Wilkinson, Technology Co-ordinator, St James Church of England Middle School, Bury St Edmunds, Suffolk. For services to Education.
- Harry Haygarth Willan. For charitable services to the community in Cumbria.
- Margaret Maureen Willetts, lately Medical Secretary, Her Majesty's Prison Birmingham.
- Beryl Wyn Williams, Safety Case Engineer, Trawsfynydd Power Station, Nuclear Electric. For services to the Electricity Industry.
- David John Williams, Editor, Bury Free Press. For services to Journalism.
- Esther Elizabeth Williams. For services to the NHS in Wales.
- Jean Williams. For services to the Girls' Brigade in Liverpool.
- Joan Margaret Williams. For services to the community in South Wales.
- Joan Olive Williams. For services to the Girls' Brigade and to the Duke of Edinburgh's Award.
- Colin Joseph Willis, Special Chief Commandant, West Mercia Special Constabulary. For services to the Police.
- Stanley William Willson. For services to the community in Birmingham.
- Barrie Kenneth Wilson, Executive Officer, Her Majesty's Board of Customs and Excise.
- Denis Sinderson Wilson, lately Executive Director, Lincoln Enterprise Agency. For services to Industry.
- Evelyn Louise Wilson. For services to the community in Tamworth, Staffordshire.
- Harold John Wilson, Postman, Hereford. For services to the Post Office and to the community in Hereford.
- Margaret Wilson, School Secretary, Grangemouth High School, Stirlingshire. For services to Education.
- Mavis Nellie Wing, Breast Care Nurse Specialist, Southampton, Hampshire. For services to Health Care.
- Malcolm Wood, Sergeant, Greater Manchester Police. For services to the Police.
- Maureen Woodhouse, Headteacher, Alverton County Primary School, Penzance, Cornwall. For services to Education.
- Elisabeth Woodwards, Nursing Auxiliary, Oxford Eye Hospital. For services to Health Care.
- Beatrice Frederika, Lady Wright. For services to Deaf People. Co-founder, Hearing Dogs for the Deaf.
- George Herbert Wycherley, Managing Director, Motherwell Bridge Fabricators. For services to Industry.
- Clifford Yates, lately Director, Oughtred and Harrison (Warehousing) Ltd. For services to Food Management.
- Valda Yates, Supervisor, Typing and Secretarial Services, Engineer's Department, Coventry City Council. For services to Local Government.
- Mary Winifred York, Member, British Red Cross Society, Leicestershire.
- Georgina Young, Typist, Ministry of Defence.

Diplomatic Service and Overseas List

- Ronald Crawford Bannerman. For water development services in Ghana.
- Margaret Elizabeth Barr. For services to English language teaching in China.
- John Randolph Batten, lately Director, ActionAid Kenya.
- John Anthony Browne. For services to the British community in Jedda.
- Linda Ann Bull, lately Head of the British Council Resources Centre, Brussels.
- Jonathan Herbert Carter. For services to British commercial interests in Saudi Arabia.
- Cham Yick-kai. For services to Hong Kong mountaineering.
- Chan Pui-tin. For public service and voluntary services to the community in Hong Kong.
- Chan Shing-chung. For services to sport for disabled people in Hong Kong.
- Francis Chipolina. For charitable services in Gibraltar.
- Anthony David Cole. For services to British commercial interests in continental Europe.
- Alicia Elizabeth Marie Dixon, Deputy Director of Social Services, Cayman Islands.
- Geoffrey Fennah. For services to British commercial interests and to the British community in Saudi Arabia.
- Susan Constance Fonlupt. Locally engaged Personal Assistant, UK Delegation to the Organisation for Economic Co-operation and Development, Paris.
- Joy Fothergill. For services to the community in the British Virgin Islands.
- David Friend. For services to agriculture in the Solomon Islands.
- Sandra Gould. For services to the community in Guyana.
- Alice Margaret Greenwood. For medical services to the community in The Gambia.
- Joseph Henry Hayward, JP Mayor of St. George's, Bermuda.
- George Chung Ho, lately Butler, British High Commissioner's Residence, Canberra.
- Ho Hau-Shiu, Accommodation Officer, British Trade Commission, Hong Kong.
- Nicholas John Hobson. For voluntary services to youth, Ascension Island.
- Alfred Nathaniel Hodge, Director of Information and Broadcasting, Anguilla.
- Hsu Show-hoo, Assistant Director of Education, Hong Kong.
- John Maxwell Jones, Acting Director of Public Works, Cayman Islands.
- Barbara Kranen. For voluntary services to the British community in Flushing, Netherlands.
- Irene Alberta Kvinge. For voluntary welfare services to the British community in the United States of America.
- Lee Kin-hung. For voluntary services to Public Health education in Hong Kong.
- Sally Lo. For services to the Hong Kong Cancer Fund.
- Rosemary Donne Edmondston-Low. For services to the British community in Luxembourg.
- Lui Yau-lok. For services to meteorological science, Hong Kong.
- Graeme Macgregor McIntosh, Chief Aircraft Engineer, Government Flying Service, Hong Kong.
- The Reverend Kingsley Meade. For welfare services to the aged and homeless in Montserrat.
- Catherine Milton. For voluntary welfare and charitable services to the community in Jamaica.
- Reginald Cecil Ponsonby Mitchell. For services to the British community in Atlanta, United States of America.
- James Francis Morris, CPM, Deputy Secretary for Security, Hong Kong.
- Alexander Ng Wai-tak, Chief Librarian, Hong Kong.
- Pang Hok-tuen, JP, Vice-Chairman, Regional Council, Hong Kong.
- Silvio Otilio Peliza, Administrator, Gibraltar General and Clerical Association.
- Stephen John Pink, Technical Works Officer, HM Embassy, Khartoum.
- Leslie Powell. For voluntary services to the British community in Malta.
- William Roland Price. For voluntary services to the British community in Madrid.
- Edward Lyndon Rees. For services to British commercial interests in Hong Kong.
- Anthony William Samson, lately Principal Government Building Surveyor, Hong Kong.
- Roger Malcolm Saunders. For services to British commercial interests and to the British community in the United Arab Emirates.
- John Christopher Shaw, lately Honorary British Consul, Chiangmai, Thailand.
- John Michael Smith. For voluntary services to the British community in Switzerland.
- John Stenning. For services to British cultural interests and to the British community in Peru.
- Margaret Elmena Swan. For voluntary charitable services in Bermuda.
- Yin-ping Tang Wat, Personal Assistant, Hong Kong Government.
- Charles Stuart M'Donnell Vane-Tempest, For voluntary services to the British community in Finland.
- Tin Ka-ping. For charitable services in Hong Kong.
- Persis Shui-ha Tsui Cheung, Senior Hostel Manageress, Hong Kong Government Service Flats.
- Wan Yiu-sing. For public service, Hong Kong.
- Elizabeth Grace Rylance-Watson, Assistant Director, British Council, Oman.
- Ophelia Wong Chau Kwun-wai, Senior Personal Secretary, Hong Kong Government.
- Yiu Yan-nang, JP, Deputy Commissioner for Labour, Hong Kong.
- Yu Hon-ping, Assistant Director, Municipal Services, Hong Kong.

=== Royal Red Cross (RRC) ===
- Colonel Sheenah Barclay Davies (486584), late Queen Alexandra's Royal Army Nursing Corps.
- Wing Commander Shelagh Utley (0408576), Princess Mary's Royal Air Force Nursing Service.

==== Associate of the Royal Red Cross (ARRC) ====
- Warrant Officer Naval Nurse Anthony Edward Byrne, Queen Alexandra's Royal Naval Nursing Service.
- Acting Chief Petty Officer Naval Nurse Elaine Teresa Hayward, Queen Alexandra's Royal Naval Nursing Service, Y001759C.
- Captain Lynn Strachan Adam (537719), Queen Alexandra's Royal Army Nursing Corps.

=== Queen's Police Medal (QPM) ===
England and Wales

- John Martin Abbott, Assistant Inspector of Constabulary, HM Inspectorate of Constabulary.
- John Stuart Brear, Sergeant, North Yorkshire Police.
- Alan Brown, Assistant Chief Constable, Northumbria Police.
- Nigel Keith Burgess, Assistant Chief Constable (designate), Gloucestershire Constabulary.
- Anthony Gray, Constable, Metropolitan Police.
- Peter James Long, Detective Superintendent, Hampshire Constabulary.
- Angus Bryan McIntosh, National Co-ordinator of Ports Policing
- Alan David Miller, Detective Chief Superintendent, Durham Constabulary.
- Barry Moss, Commander, Metropolitan Police.
- Elizabeth Neville, Assistant Chief Constable (designate), Northamptonshire Police.
- Michael O'Byrne, Assistant Chief Constable (designate), Bedfordshire Police.
- Denis Francis O'Connor, Assistant Chief Constable (designate), Kent Constabulary.
- Daniel James O'Doherty, Detective Constable, Greater Manchester Police.
- John Francis Purnell, Commander, Metropolitan Police.
- Norwell Lionel Roberts, Detective Sergeant, Metropolitan Police.
- Colin Sheppard, Assistant Chief Constable (designate), Norfolk Constabulary.
- Peter John Viner, Chief Superintendent, Thames Valley Police.
- Leslie Alan Waters, Chief Superintendent, Cambridgeshire Constabulary (Staff Officer to HM Inspectorate of Constabulary).

Scotland

- David Anthony Beattie, Assistant Chief Constable, Grampian Police.
- Ian Campbell Mackinnon, Assistant Chief Constable, Strathclyde Police.
- John Henderson Ogg, Detective Superintendent, Central Police.

Northern Ireland

- Robert Cairns, Detective Superintendent, Royal Ulster Constabulary.
- Joseph Robert Meeke, Detective Chief Superintendent, Royal Ulster Constabulary.

Hong Kong

- Eric John Lockeyear, Chief Superintendent, Royal Hong Kong Police.
- Matthew Vincent Walsh, Chief Superintendent, Royal Hong Kong Police.
- Wong Leung Kam-shan, Chief Superintendent, Royal Hong Kong Police.
- Yip Kwok-keung, Assistant Commissioner, Royal Hong Kong Police.

=== Queen's Fire Services Medal (QFSM) ===
England and Wales

- Stephen Broadhurst, Station Officer, Merseyside Fire Brigade.
- Colin Leonard Brum, lately Senior Divisional Officer, London Fire Brigade.
- William Archibald Bushby, Assistant Chief Officer, Hampshire Fire Service.
- David John Hutchings, Divisional Officer I, Avon Fire Brigade.
- David Arthur Jerrom, Assistant Chief Officer, West Midlands Fire Service.
- Martin Kitchen, Chief Fire Officer, Surrey Fire Service.
- John Alan Livesey, Assistant Chief Officer, Lancashire Fire Brigade.
- Robert Vernon Marks, lately Deputy Assistant Chief Officer, London Fire Brigade.
- Michael William Overall, Assistant Chief Officer, London Fire Brigade.
- Derek Edward Charles Thacker, Chief Fire Officer, Cleveland Fire Brigade.
- Roy Williamson, Chief Fire Officer, Humberside Fire Brigade.

Scotland

- Allan Smith Whitton, Assistant Firemaster, Central Region Fire Brigade.

Hong Kong

- Tang Siu, Chief Fire Officer, Royal Hong Kong Fire Service.

=== Colonial Police Medal (CPM) ===
- Anthony Au Yiu-kwan, Senior Superintendent, Royal Hong Kong Police Force.
- James Hogg Bruce, GM, Senior Superintendent, Royal Hong Kong Police Force.
- Chan Siu-fat, Station Sergeant, Royal Hong Kong Police Force.
- Stephen Gowan Chandler, Senior Superintendent, Royal Hong Kong Police Force.
- Chu Chung-ming, Station Sergeant, Royal Hong Kong Police Force.
- Chu Kut-chuen, Principal Fireman, Royal Hong Kong Fire Service.
- Chu Yu-pang, BEM, Principal Fireman, Royal Hong Kong Fire Service.
- Chung Kin-hong, Principal Fireman, Royal Hong Kong Fire Service.
- Ho Wing-huen, Station Sergeant, Royal Hong Kong Police Force.
- Blaine Stewart Hoggard, Senior Superintendent, Royal Hong Kong Police Force.
- David William Holloway, Senior Superintendent, Royal Hong Kong Police Force.
- Kan Wai-hung, Station Sergeant, Royal Hong Kong Police Force.
- Anthony Ku Kin-wa, Senior Superintendent, Royal Hong Kong Police Force.
- Lau King, Station Sergeant, Royal Hong Kong Police Force.
- Lau Wai-ming, Senior Superintendent, Royal Hong Kong Police Force.
- Lee Kam-chung, Chief Superintendent (Auxiliary), Royal Hong Kong Auxiliary Police Force.
- Leung Chun-keung, Station Sergeant, Royal Hong Kong Police Force.
- Leung Kwok-keung, Station Sergeant, Royal Hong Kong Police Force.
- Lo Ping-chuen, Inspector, Royal Hong Kong Police Force.
- Hymayun Abdul Razack, Superintendent, Royal Hong Kong Police Force.
- Richard Ian Tyzzer, Senior Superintendent, Royal Hong Kong Police Force.
- James Wong Ka-sing, Superintendent, Royal Hong Kong Police Force.
- Yeung Ying-wai, Senior Superintendent, Royal Hong Kong Police Force.
- Brian Jeffrey Gibbs, Inspector, Cayman Islands Police Force.

== Cook Islands ==
=== Order of the British Empire ===
==== Officer of the Order of the British Empire (OBE) ====
Civil Division

- Iaveta Taunga o-te-tini Short. For public services, lately as High Commissioner for the Cook Islands in New Zealand.

==== Member of the Order of the British Empire (MBE) ====
Civil Division

- George Cowan. For public services, lately as Secretary of Works.

== The Bahamas ==
=== Order of the British Empire ===
==== Officer of the Order of the British Empire (OBE) ====
Civil Division

- Benjamin Anthony Astarita. For services to the community.
- Elizabeth Kenning. For services to the Bahamas Humane Society.
- The Very Reverend Foster Bancroft Pestaina. For services to the community.

==== Member of the Order of the British Empire (MBE) ====
Civil Division

- Herbert Hilton Minnis. For services to the community.
- Harald Spencer Poitier. For services to education and the community.
- Errol (Duke) Strachan. For services to the community in the field of music and entertainment.

=== British Empire Medal (BEM) ===
Civil Division

- Laura Louise Anderson. For services to the community.
- Mamie Enola Linda Astwood. For services to the community in the field of education.
- Edna Gertrude Butler. For services to the community.
- Sebastion Arthur Campbell. For services to the community.
- George William Wilberforce Gardiner. For public service.
- Ruth Patricia Clarke-Goodridge. For services in the field of education.
- Richard David Moss. For services in the field of tourism.
- Sydney Kenneth Whitfield. For services to the community.

== Grenada ==
=== Knight Bachelor ===
- The Honourable Curtis Victor Strachan, CVO. For services in promoting parliamentary democracy in Grenada and the Caribbean and for public service.

=== Order of the British Empire ===
==== Commander of the Order of the British Empire (CBE) ====
Civil Division

- Monsignor Cyril Lamontagne. For services to the Christian community and the people of Grenada.

==== Officer of the Order of the British Empire (OBE) ====
Civil Division

- Marjorie Budhoo. For public service.
- Clarence Eric Pierre. For services to the Trade Union movement.

==== Member of the Order of the British Empire (MBE) ====
Civil Division

- Nadia Benjamin. For services to community development and social work.

== Papua New Guinea ==
=== Knight Bachelor ===
- The Honourable Mr. Justice Kubulan Los, CBE. For public services and services to the judiciary.
- Mea Vai, CBE, ISO. For services to Scouting and the community.

=== Order of Saint Michael and Saint George ===
==== Knight Commander of the Order of St Michael and St George (KCMG) ====
- The Right Honourable Rabbie Langanai Namaliu, CMG, MP. For public services and services to politics.

==== Companion of the Order of St Michael and St George (CMG) ====
- The Honourable John Giheno, MP. For services to politics.

=== Order of the British Empire ===
==== Commander of the Order of the British Empire (CBE) ====
Civil Division

- Micah Malot Pitpit. For services to the public and the judiciary.
- The Reverend Wala Tamate, OBE. For services to the community and the Church.

==== Officer of the Order of the British Empire (OBE) ====
Military Division

- Lieutenant Colonel Ignatius Lai, Papua New Guinea Defence Force.

Civil Division

- Felicia Dobunaba. For services to women and the public service.
- Dr. James Sammuel Ferguson, MBE. For services to the community.
- James Lamont. For services to the community.
- Father Adrian Francis Meaney. For services to the Church and the community.
- David Natakin Mulul. For services to education and the community.
- Henry Saminga. For services to education and politics.

==== Member of the Order of the British Empire (MBE) ====
Military Division

- Chief Warrant Officer William Karive, Papua New Guinea Defence Force.

Civil Division

- Chief Inspector Micah Anaiwe. For services to the Royal Papua New Guinea Constabulary.
- Arthur Ross Humphries. For services to commerce and industry.
- Katherine Han Ping Johnston. For services to the community.
- Carl Jamal Bim Kalwan. For services to the public service auditing and accounting profession.
- Malai Kama. For services to the people of Simbu Province.
- Maip Kei. For services to the community.
- Anne Baloiloi Kerepla. For services to women and the community.
- Make Kope. For services to the community.
- Paul Maredei. For services to the community and local government.
- Chief Inspector Joseph Masa. For services to community and police relations.
- Joseph Molealeng. For services to the Government and the community.
- Jack George Nouairi. For services to the Public Service and the community.
- Pauline Onsa. For services to the community.
- Robert Parer. For services to business and the community.
- Joan Christine Vanariu. For public service.
- Mel Waipa. For services to the Local Government Council and the Western Highlands Provincial Government.
- Jacobeth Wanera. For services to teaching and the community.
- Kina Wulo. For services to the community and the Western Highlands Province.

=== Companion of the Imperial Service Order (ISO) ===
- Lobe Ure Geno. For services to the public auditing profession and the community.

=== British Empire Medal (BEM) ===
Civil Division

- Liangao Amaiu. For services to the community.
- Kabilyi Kaveta Angalu. For services to the community church and the Government.
- Aboa Bibomi. For services to the Department of Works and to the State.
- Godua Biri. For services to the Department of Works.
- Koaru Fose. For services to the Papua New Guinea Government.
- First Constable Wipa Nemba. For distinguished service to the Royal Papua New Guinea Constabulary.
- Francis Savitas. For services to teaching and to the community.
- Ogoave Sohembo. For services to the State and to the Royal Papua New Guinea Constabulary.
- Bissar Udil. For services to the community.
- Kinamo Yokone. For services to law and order, the Government and the community.

=== Queen's Police Medal (QPM) ===
- Chief Inspector Patrick Baiwan. For services to the Royal Papua New Guinea Constabulary Dog Unit.

=== Queen's Fire Services Medal (QFSM) ===
- Station Officer Luke Barnabas. For services to the community.
- Superintendent Numa Namona. For services to the community.

== The Solomon Islands ==
=== Order of the British Empire ===
==== Commander of the Order of the British Empire (CBE) ====
Civil Division

- Francis Mwanesalua. For services to the legal profession.

==== Officer of the Order of the British Empire (OBE) ====
Civil Division

- The Honourable Allan Qurusu Mela, MP. For services to politics.

==== Member of the Order of the British Empire (MBE) ====
Civil Division

- Waisea Bainivalu. For services to sport and commerce.
- Allan Kevu Boso. For services to sport.
- Andrew Dakatia. For services to sport.
- Wilson Cecil Maelaua. For services to sport.
- Samson Maeniuta. For services to education.

== Tuvalu ==
=== Order of the British Empire ===
==== Member of the Order of the British Empire (MBE) ====
Civil Division

- Tito Isala. For public services and services to education.
- Pravin Sundarjee. For services to the Government of Tuvalu.

== St. Vincent and the Grenadines ==
=== Order of the British Empire ===
==== Member of the Order of the British Empire (MBE) ====
Civil Division

- Bertram Alban Arthur. For services to the community and to culture.

== Belize ==
=== Order of the British Empire ===
==== Commander of the Order of the British Empire (CBE) ====
Civil Division

- Compton Gerald Fairweather. For services to Belize.

==== Officer of the Order of the British Empire (OBE) ====
Civil Division

- Edward Dougal Flowers. For services to social life and sport.
- Edward Augustus Pitts. For services to the Credit Union Movement, the public service and sport.

==== Member of the Order of the British Empire (MBE) ====
Civil Division

- Teresa Padron Aragon. For services to education and the community.
- The Reverend Leroy Worman Flowers. For services to religious life.
- Joyce Emily Thompson. For services to education.
- Angus McPherson Vernon. For services to sport.

== Antigua and Barbuda ==
=== Order of Saint Michael and Saint George ===
==== Companion of the Order of St Michael and St George (CMG) ====
- Yvonne Maginley. For public and community service.

=== Order of the British Empire ===
==== Member of the Order of the British Empire (MBE) ====
Civil Division

- Constance Madeline Blackman. For services to tourism.

=== Queen's Police Medal (QPM) ===
- Superintendent Charles Franklin Theophilus Barton. For services to the Royal Antigua and Barbuda Police Force.
- Assistant Commissioner Cardinal Augustus King. For services to the Royal Antigua and Barbuda Police Force.
- Assistant Commissioner Elton Martin. For services to the Royal Antigua and Barbuda Police Force.
- Assistant Commissioner Truehart Moraine Smith. For services to the Royal Antigua and Barbuda Police Force.
