= Rodney Harris =

Medical geneticist

Professor Rodney Harris CBE FRCP FRCPath
- Born: 1932
- Died: 7 December 2017 (aged 85)
- Occupation: Geneticist

Rodney Harris (1932 – 7 December 2017) was a British geneticist.

From 1982 to 1989 he advised the United Kingdom Department of Health as Consultant Adviser in Medical Genetics to the Chief Medical Officer.

He served as chair of the UK National Confidential Inquiry into Genetic Counselling (1986–1990), chair of the Royal College of Physicians of London Committee on Clinical Genetics, as chair of the European Union's concerted Action on Genetic Services in Europe, and as coordinator of the EU-backed GenEd programme.

He was Professor of Medical Genetics at the University of Manchester from 1980 to 1997, becoming Emeritus on retirement.

He was a Fellow of the Royal College of Physicians (FRCP) and a Fellow of the Royal College of Pathologists (FRCPath), and was made a Commander of the Order of the British Empire (CBE) in the 1996 New Year Honours, "For services to Medicine".

He died on 7 December 2017 at the age of 85.
