= Michael Philip Westwood =

Retired Royal Air Force officer (b. 1944)

- Born: 1944 (age 80–81)

Wing Commander Michael Philip Westwood OBE (born 1944) is a retired Royal Air Force officer.

== Education ==
Educated at Abingdon School in Abingdon-on-Thames from September 1955 until 1962. His interest in flying came to fruition in 1961 when he won three awards at the National Aircraft Recognition competition in London, the Air Pictorial trophy and Britannia trophy were individual awards and a further team award was the Heracles trophy, won with G N J Lewis. Mike later secured a flying scholarship with the Royal Air Force. The pair were members of the 2121 (Abingdon) Squadron Air Training Corps and won the Heracles trophy for a second successive year. After leaving Abingdon he gained a commission in 1963.

== Career ==
He trained at the No. 7, Flying Training School as a Pilot Officer on the Jet Provost and Vickers Varsity and was awarded the Scroll of Merit at the Passing out Parade at South Cerney R.A.F. Centre. He was posted to 84 Squadron at RAF Khormaksar and then as a Hercules captain at RAF Fairford and then RAF Lyneham.

After a posting as Air Cadet Liaison Officer at RAF Brampton where he liaised with thirty CCF sections he moved to RAF Brize Norton on VC10's. He served as a 10 Squadron Flight Commander in 1979, was posted to the Air Staff at RAF Upavon in 1981 and then HQ Strike Command before a promotion to wing commander in 1991. He retired in 2001.

== Awards and retirement ==
In 1996 he was awarded the Order of the British Empire OBE in the 1996 New Year Honours for his involvement with the operational control of the Sarajevo Airlift. After retirement served as Chairman of the 10 Squadron Flight Association and also received a RAeC Certificate of Merit for outstanding contribution to sports and military parachuting.

== See also ==
- List of Old Abingdonians
