= ActionAid Kenya =

Non-governmental aid organisation in Kenya

ActionAid Kenya, a non-political, non-religious organisation that has been working in Kenya since 1972 to tackle the problem of poverty. It is one of the leading anti-poverty agencies working directly with over one million poor in Kenya. ActionAid Kenya employs a multi-dimensional approach in alleviating the poverty issue in Kenya, which involve the promotion and defence of human rights by improving access to education, food, water and medicine. Instead of direct monetary assistance, these services for the community would come under long-term sustainable programmes working for permanent change in Kenya.

== Ensure poor have access to medicine ==
ActionAid Kenya actively campaign for lower prices and greater availability of anti-retroviral (ARV) drugs for the poor. It is part of the Kenya Coalition on Access to Essential Medicine (KCAEM), which is made of various NGOs campaigning for greater access to medicine. KCAEM was successful in campaigning for changes in legislature including the re-amendment of the Intellectual Property Act (IPA) in 2002 which allowed generic drugs to be imported for the treatment of HIV.

== Ensure basic rights for poor farmers ==
Sugar cane is essential to Kenya's economy and the main contributors to sugar production are mostly small farmers. The farmers are often excluded from decision-making processes, hence leading to exploitation by the sugar companies. Kenya makes about £24 million a year in revenue from sugar, but farmers are owed more than £16 million in delayed payments. ActionAid realised the need for farmers to work together in order to increase their bargaining power and thus helped to set up Sugar campaign for change (SUCAM) in which the farmers were informed of their rights by ActionAid. In 2002, a new Sugar Bill was adopted and the first law to regulate the sugar industry comes intro act. This Bill states that 7 out of the 14 members of the Sugar Board must be elected farmer representatives, and farmers now have to be paid within 30 days of their crop being collected. SUCAM and ActionAid are continuing their efforts to lobby for the recognition of the rights and interests of farmers through national and international campaigns. The program will benefit the farmers in terms of timely payments and fair compensation for their sugar produce.

== Ensure equal rights for women and water sustainability for the community ==
Women traditionally played a minimal role in development activities in Thakara. They were expected to do most of the household chores and would walk up to 15 km a day to collect drinkable water. Access to clean water was their main problem and ActionAid Kenya identified a local river as a potential source of piped water. After discussions with local community, Thakara Women Water Users Association (TWWUA) was formed and women were put in charge of the project reflecting their traditional role. Women were trained in management techniques, protection of the water supply, maintenance techniques and record keeping. This improved their confidence, self-esteem and power in the community. Eleven separate kiosk management committees were set up and 14,000 households now have easy access to clean water and remain free from water-borne diseases. Profits from the kiosks have been used to run further educational courses.

== See also ==
- ActionAid International
