= Hong Kong Cancer Fund =

- Founded: 1987; 39 years ago
- Founder: Sally Lo
- Type: Charitable institution
- Purpose: Free Cancer Consultation, Cancer Services, Cancer Support
- Location: Hong Kong, China
- Region served: Hong Kong
- Method: Free services to anyone touched by cancer their 5 CancerLink support centres and Cancer Patient Resource Centres in 7 hospitals in Hong Kong. Support cancer research projects and improve hospital environment.
- Website: cancer-fund.org pink.cancer-fund.org

Hong Kong Cancer Fund
- Traditional Chinese: 香港癌症基金會
- Simplified Chinese: 香港癌症基金会
Transcriptions
Standard Mandarin
- Hanyu Pinyin: Xiānggǎng Áizhèng Jījīnhuì
Yue: Cantonese
- Jyutping: hoeng1 gong2 ngaam4 zing3 gei1 gam1 wui6*2

Hong Kong Cancer Fund was established in 1987 with a mission to better the quality of cancer support in Hong Kong. It is the largest cancer support organisation in Hong Kong providing free information and professional services to anyone who has or is affected by cancer.

== History ==
Hong Kong Cancer Fund was established in 1987 to provide support, information and care to those living with cancer, and to increase awareness and knowledge of cancer in the community.

== Services and Activities ==
=== Wellness programme and therapeutic workshops ===
Help cancer patients to relax, tackle negative emotions, relieve stress and restore confidence through yoga, meditation, breathing exercises, horticulture, music and art therapy.
