= Dorothy Geddes =

First woman dentist in the UK (1936–1998)

Dorothy Geddes FRCS OBE
- Born: 8 May 1936; Alloa, Scotland
- Died: 14 March 1998 (aged 61)
- Education: University of Edinburgh
- Occupations: Oral surgeon, academic
- Known for: First woman to be appointed to a professorship of dentistry in the United Kingdom

Dorothy Ann Malcolm Geddes OBE FRCS (8 May 1936 – 14 March 1998) was the first woman to be appointed to a professorship of dentistry in the United Kingdom.

== Life ==
Dorothy Ann Malcolm Geddes was born in Alloa, Scotland on 8 May 1936. She attended Brechin High School, going on to study dentistry at the University of Edinburgh, graduating in 1959. She worked for most of her career at University of Glasgow where she was Dean of the Faculty of Dental Surgery. Geddes' specialism was oral surgery. She was the first woman to be awarded Fellowship in Dental Surgery (FRCS) of the Royal College of Surgeons of Edinburgh, in 1963. She was a distinguished teacher and researcher and gained a personal chair. She was President of the Royal Odonto-Chirugical Society of Scotland, President of the West of Scotland Branch of the British Dental Association, and Convener of the Dental Council.

== Death and legacy ==
Geddes died 14 March 1998. The University of Glasgow established the Dorothy Geddes Multimedia Laboratory to promote the application of new, cutting-edge technology to the teaching of oral biology. The university also awards the Geddes Research Fellowship and medal.

She is remembered as a "modest, quiet woman with a wicked sense of humour, who is remembered with universal affection and more than a little awe".

== Awards and honours ==
- OBE, in 1995
- European Organization for Caries Research Rolex Prize, in 1998
