= International Fund for Ireland =

Organisation to promote contact between nationalists and unionists

- Formation: 1986
- Founded at: Belfast, Northern Ireland
- Type: NGO
- Legal status: Registered Irish Charity
- Purpose: Promote economic and social advance and encourage contact between nationalists and unionists in border areas
- Headquarters: 28-32 Alfred St, Belfast BT2 8EN, Northern Ireland
- Official language: English
- Chairman: Paddy Harte

The International Fund for Ireland is an independent international organization established in 1986 by the British and Irish governments with the objectives of promoting "economic and social advance" and "to encourage contact, dialogue and reconciliation between nationalists and unionists throughout Ireland."

This Fund operates with co-operation and financial contributions from the governments of United States of America, Canada, Australia and New Zealand, as well as the structures of the European Union. The majority of its funding comes from the United States. As of 2007, £576m / €849m, funding over 5,700 projects across the island of Ireland, has been disbursed.
