= Light Hall School =

Location
- Hathaway Road, Shirley; Solihull, West Midlands, B90 2PZ; England; 52°24′00″N 1°49′49″W

Information
- Type: Academy
- Motto: The best from everyone, all of the time.
- Religious affiliation: Mixed
- Specialist: Mathematics & Computing College
- Department for Education URN: 137231 Tables
- Ofsted: Reports
- Head Teacher: V McManus
- Deputy Headteacher: R Hall/R McCrainor
- Gender: Mixed
- Age: 11 to 18
- Enrolment: 1058
- Houses: Atlantis, Discovery, Challenger, Endeavour
- Website: lighthall.co.uk

Light Hall School is a secondary school located in Shirley, West Midlands, England.

Light Hall School was established on Hathaway Road in 1965 as a boys' grammar school on land once belonging to Light Hall Farm.

Light Hall School is one of sixteen secondary schools in the UK Metropolitan Borough of Solihull. As of 2025, the school has over 1050 students, from ages eleven to eighteen.

The school suffered from a fire in February 2006; a new building was opened in October 2008 to replace the destroyed classrooms. The new building has classrooms for mathematics, English, music and drama. It also has a new dining hall, library, media studies classrooms and offices. The Design and Technology Block was refurbished in April 2013 with a new CAD/CAM room which has a laser and 3D printers and a workshop area containing a forge for smelting.

In September 2024, the school opened a newly renovated sixth form wing to offer A-level courses to students aged 16–18.
