= Edward Gonner =

English economist

Sir Edward Carter Kearsey Gonner
- Born: 1862
- Died: 1922
- Occupations: Economist; Professor of Economics Science
- Awards: Commander of the Order of the British Empire; Knight Commander of the Order of the British Empire

Sir Edward Carter Kearsey Gonner KBE (1862 - 1922) was an English economist, Professor of Economic Science at the University of Liverpool.

== Early life ==
Gonner was born on 5 March 1862 in Mayfair, London, to Peter Kersey Gonner, a silk mercer, and Elizabeth Carter. He attended Merchant Taylors' School in London, before matriculating at Lincoln College, Oxford in 1880, graduating B.A. in 1884.

== Career ==
He was a lecturer for the London Extension Society, as well as for University College, Bristol. In 1891 he was appointed professor at the University of Liverpool. His works on economics included Common Land and Inclosure (1912). He was made CBE in 1918 and KBE in 1921.
