= Robert Mabro =

Robert Emile Mabro
- Born: 26 December 1934
- Died: 2 August 2016 (aged 81); Crete, Greece
- Spouse: Judy
- Children: Two daughters, Nevine & Nyla
- Awards: CBE, 1995; Order of the Aztec Eagle, 1997; Order of Francisco de Miranda, 2000; Officier des Palmes Académiques, 2001

Academic background
- Education: BSc Engineering, Alexandria University, 1956; MSc Economics, University of London, 1966

Academic work
- Institutions: St Antony's College, Oxford; Oxford Institute for Energy Studies
- Main interests: Oil and energy policy

Robert Emile Mabro CBE (26 December 1934 – 2 August 2016) was an academic who specialised in oil and energy issues. He founded the Oxford Institute for Energy Studies, and in the late 1990s brokered a historic production cut between OPEC and its rivals in the wake of a slump in the price of oil.

== Early life and education ==
Mabro was born in Alexandria, Egypt, in December 1934, the son of Greek Orthodox parents who had migrated from Tripoli, Lebanon in the 1860s. He graduated with a BSc in Engineering from Alexandria University in 1956, after which he worked as a civil engineer in Egypt for a number of years. In 1960 he joined a Jesuit seminary near Paris and spent the next four years studying philosophy; he then went to London to study economics as a post-graduate student at the School of Oriental & African Studies. He took his MSc in 1966, and then became a researcher in economics at SOAS, where he met Judy, whom he married in 1967.

== Career ==
In 1971, Mabro was made a Fellow of St Antony's College, Oxford. Throughout the 1970s, Mabro's interest in oil- and energy-related matters grew, and he wrote his first monograph on the subject - "Oil Producers and Consumers: Conflict or Cooperation" - in 1974. He founded the Oxford Energy Policy Club in 1976; the club continues to meet biannually and gives oil industry executives and senior government officials from around the world the opportunity to hold informal, off-the-record talks. He set up the Oxford Energy Seminar, which has been held annually since 1979 and is widely recognised as an important international forum on energy. In 1982, Mabro founded the Oxford Institute for Energy Studies, an educational charity devoted to researching the economics, politics and impact on international relations of oil, gas and other energies. He served as the institute's Director until 2003, and was made its Honorary President in 2006. In the 1995 New Year Honours Mabro was appointed a CBE. He was elected a Fellow of St Catherine's College, Oxford in 2006. He is widely held in libraries worldwide. He died on Crete, Greece, on 2 August 2016.

== 1997 oil production cut ==
In the wake of the 1997 Asian financial crisis, oil prices plunged sharply to below $10 a barrel, which had significant negative effects on the economies of crude oil producers around the world. However, a history of distrust and a desire to protect their own market share was preventing any cooperation to counter the price fall amongst the nations affected. In early 1998, following a meeting in Oxford with Adrian Lajous, the head of Mexico's state-owned oil company Pemex, Mabro held a series of meetings and phone calls in which he acted as an intermediary between officials from Saudi Arabia and Venezuela, and their Mexican rivals. This initiative led to joint production cuts in late 1998 and early 1999, the effect of which was that by mid-2000 the price of crude oil had recovered to more than $30 a barrel. Lajous later recalled, "Robert Mabro played a key, if unaccredited, role in the secret negotiations that brought together these three countries." Mabro himself later suggested that OPEC should change its logo to a tea-bag “because it only works in hot water.”

== Publications ==
- The Egyptian Economy, 1952-72 (1974)
- The Industrialization of Egypt, 1939-73: Policy and Performance (co-author, 1976)
- World Energy Issues and Politics (1980)
- The Market for North Sea Crude Oil (co-author, 1986)
- Oil Markets and Prices: The Brent Market and the Formation of World Oil Prices (co-author, 1993)
- Energy Taxation and Economic Growth (co-author, 1994)
- The Oil Price Crisis of 1998 (1998)
- Gas to Europe: The Strategies of Four Major Suppliers (co-author, 1999)
- Oil in the Twenty-First Century: Issues, Challenges, and Opportunities (2006)
- Oil Markets and Prices: The Brent Market and the Formation of World Oil Prices (co-author)
