= Ian McAllister =

Ian McAllister may refer to:

- Ian McAllister (businessman) (born 1943), Scottish businessman
- Ian McAllister (conservationist) (born 1969), Canadian conservationist
- Ian McAllister (footballer) (born 1960), former professional footballer
- Ian McAllister (political scientist) (born 1950), political scientist
