= P. W. H. Brown =

British academic

Peter Wilfred Henry Brown CBE (born 4 June 1941) was Secretary to the British Academy, 1983–2006. In 1995, he was made Knight Grand Cross of the Order of Merit of the Republic of Poland.

== Life ==
Educated at Jesus College, Cambridge, Brown was an assistant master in classics at the Birkenhead School from 1963 to 1966, and a lecturer in classics at Fourah Bay College, University of Sierra Leone from 1966 to 1968.

He was deputy secretary of the British Academy from 1975 to 1983, acting secretary from 1976 to 1983, and secretary from 1983 to 2006. Brown serves on the Supervisory Committee of the Oxford Dictionary of National Biography, and the editorial board of the Royal Society.

== Honors ==
He was a 1978 fellow at the National Humanities Center in North Carolina, working on "Gibbon’s Use of His Sources". He was made an honorary fellow at the British School at Rome in 2007.

Brown was awarded an Honorary DLitt from both the University of Birmingham, and the University of Sheffield, and the Knight Cross Order of Merit of the Republic of Poland.

== Sources ==
- ‘BROWN, Peter Wilfred Henry’, Who's Who 2011, A & C Black, 2011; online edn, Oxford University Press, Dec 2010; online edn, Oct 2010 accessed 30 May 2011
