= List of public art in Solihull =

This is a list of public art in the Metropolitan Borough of Solihull, in the West Midlands county of England. This list applies only to works of public art accessible in an outdoor public space. For example, this does not include artwork in museums.

== Solihull Town Centre ==
Image	Title / subject	Location and coordinates	Date	Artist / designer	Type	Material	Dimensions	Designation	Owner / administrator	Wikidata	Notes
More images	Family Outing	Mell Square 52.413455°N 1.775802°W	1985	John Ravera	statue	Bronze			Solihull Metropolitan Borough Council	Q47490619	Now in a small play area behind the Taste Collective, but in the same location
More images	The Horse and Horse Tamer Group	Malvern Park 52.411113°N 1.771022°W	1874	Joseph Boehm	statue	Bronze		Grade II listed	Solihull Metropolitan Borough Council	Q47490855	Originally in the gardens of Tudor Grange (nearby Solihull College). Donated by Oliver Bird to the Borough of Solihull in 1944. Presented to the council in 1953. Vandalised in 2012. Restored by donations by the end of that year.
	Waitrose sculpture	Waitrose, Herbert Road, Solihull 52.413107°N 1.782575°W	2016		Sculpture				Waitrose		
	Conduct	Outside the Chapel at Solihull School 52.414412°N 1.769163°W	2015	Matthew Lane Sanderson	Sculpture	Steel	5 metres tall and 3 metres wide		Solihull School		In the chapel forecourt

== Bickenhill ==
Image	Title / subject	Location and coordinates	Date	Artist / designer	Type	Material	Dimensions	Designation	Owner / administrator	Notes
More images	Take Off	Roundabout on Bickenhill Lane on the approach to Birmingham Airport 52.4466°N 1.7300°W	c. 1989	Walenty Pytel	sculpture	Galvanized Steel			Birmingham Airport	Depicts 3 egrets in flights. Situated on the main roundabout entering airport. Commemorates 40 years of peace in Europe
More images	Beyond All Limits	Near the Pendigo Lake, National Exhibition Centre 52.450265°N 1.718868°W	2012	Luke Burton	Sculpture	recycled material aluminium, stainless steel and titanium			National Exhibition Centre	Commissioned to commemorate the London 2012 Olympics and Paralympics dedidcated by John Burton to Help for Heroes.

== Chelmsley Wood ==
Image	Title / subject	Location and coordinates	Date	Artist / designer	Type	Material	Dimensions	Designation	Owner / administrator	Wikidata	Notes
More images	Butterfly	Queen's Gardens, Kingshurst Brook, Chelmsley Wood 52.480356°N 1.743060°W	August 17, 2026	Doddz	Sculpture	Steel			Solihull Metropolitan Borough Council		Part of the Kingshurst Brook Community Trail. Made of former shopping trolleys.

== Dickens Heath ==
Image	Title / subject	Location and coordinates	Date	Artist / designer	Type	Material	Dimensions	Designation	Owner / administrator	Wikidata	Notes
More images	Sculpture near The Customs House	Near The Customs House, Rumbush Lane, Dickens Heath 52.383208°N 1.835741°W			Sculpture	Steel and stone blocks			Solihull Metropolitan Borough Council		

== Elmdon ==
Image	Title / subject	Location and coordinates	Date	Artist / designer	Type	Material	Dimensions	Designation	Owner / administrator	Notes
	Twitters	Elmdon Park, Elmdon 52.441224°N 1.768112°W	2003		Sculpture	Wood			Solihull Metropolitan Borough Council	It is carved from a tree that was removed from the park. It resembles an owl
More images	Elmdon Park Totem Pole	Elmdon Park, Elmdon 52.442358°N 1.771462°W	2004		Totempole	Wood			Solihull Metropolitan Borough Council	The totem pole was created from ideas put forward by local schools, after an Oaks and Shires event in 2004.

== Knowle ==
Image	Title / subject	Location and coordinates	Date	Artist / designer	Type	Material	Dimensions	Designation	Owner / administrator	Wikidata	Notes
More images	Knowle Library's Owl	Knot Garden, Knowle Library 52.391260°N 1.734825°W	2018	Robot Cossey	Sculpture	Large oak tree trunk			Solihull Metropolitan Borough Council		Created to honor the Knowle Society’s co-founder and inaugural Chairman, Dr. Ronald J. Bower, this sculpture features an owl atop a collection of books. While most titles reflect local heritage, the inclusion of Gray’s Anatomy serves as a tribute to Dr. Bower’s lifelong dedication to the community as a medical doctor.

== Olton ==
Image	Title / subject	Location and coordinates	Date	Artist / designer	Type	Material	Dimensions	Designation	Owner / administrator	Notes
More images	Saxon King on Horse	Station Drive outside of Olton Station 52.438151°N 1.805046°W		John McKenna	Statue	Steel	2m high		West Midlands Network	Also called 'King of Olton'.
More images	Edith Holden Owl sculpture	Kineton Green Road, Olton 52.433807°N 1.812178°W	March 7, 2020	Robot Cossey	Wooden sculpture	Wood			Solihull Metropolitan Borough Council	Was carved out of a tree stump that was already on the site. It is in honour of Edith Holden who lived on this street over 100 years ago, an "eco-warrior" of the Edwardian era. It has been caged since September 2020, to prevent "chainsaw vandals".

== Shirley ==
=== Poppy Island ===
Image	Title / subject	Location and coordinates	Date	Artist / designer	Type	Material	Dimensions	Designation	Owner / administrator	Notes
More images	Poppy Island	Stratford Road, Shirley 52.415421°N 1.829108°W	2017	GRP Building Products; SR Davis Architects	Sculpture				Solihull Metropolitan Borough Council	On the roundabout near Haslucks Green Road, Stratford Road and Olton Road. A tribute to the fallen soldiers of World War I

=== Shirley Park ===
Image	Title / subject	Location and coordinates	Date	Artist / designer	Type	Material	Dimensions	Designation	Owner / administrator	Notes
	Donkey Derby	Shirley Park – Shirley 52.410686°N 1.828087°W	2014	Zantium Studios	Circular pavement Mosaic	Glass tiles	2m diameter		Solihull Metropolitan Borough Council	
	Native Butterflies	Shirley Park – Shirley 52.410369°N 1.830933°W	2014	Zantium Studios	Circular pavement Mosaic	Glass tiles	2m diameter		Solihull Metropolitan Borough Council	
	Maze	Shirley Park – Shirley 52.41027°N 1.830337°W	2014	Zantium Studios	Circular pavement Mosaic	Glass tiles	2m diameter		Solihull Metropolitan Borough Council	
	Giant Tortoise	Shirley Park – Shirley 52.410843°N 1.828441°W	2014	Robot Cossey	Wooden sculpture	Oak			Solihull Metropolitan Borough Council	Carved from oak trees felled from the park
	Wildlife Totem Pole	Shirley Park – Shirley 52.410843°N 1.828441°W	2014	Robot Cossey	Wooden sculpture	Oak			Solihull Metropolitan Borough Council	Carved from oak trees felled from the park
	Training Shoe Bench	Shirley Park – Shirley 52.410529°N 1.828543°W	2014	Robot Cossey	Wooden sculpture	Oak			Solihull Metropolitan Borough Council	Carved from oak trees felled from the park

== Lost or in Storage ==
Image	Title / subject	Location and coordinates	Date	Artist / designer	Type	Material	Dimensions	Designation	Owner / administrator	Wikidata	Notes
	Pyramid	Formerly in Mell Square	2010		Sculpture				Solihull Metropolitan Borough Council		Was a large chess board here until 2009-10. Removed when the Taste Collective was developed in 2019.
	The Forest	Formerly outside Solihull Station	2001	Marcus Steel	Sculpture	Galvanized steel			Transport for West Midlands		Was the Solihull Interchange sculpture. It consisted of three abstract, metallic "trees" that were meant to represent Solihull’s motto, "Urbs in Rure" (The Town in the Country). It bridged the gap between the industrial nature of the railway and the leafy, "Silhillian" identity of the town. It was removed by 2011 after a minor refurbishment outside the station from Chiltern Railways
	Shark	Formerly Scuba Diving Centre - Haslucks Green Road, Shirley	Late 2000s		Sculpture	Fiberglass			The former Scuba Diving Centre		The shark had been above the retail unit since the late 2000s at least. The retail unit here became Phone Hub around 2016, and the shark removed around 2017. And The Two Mugs from 2019.
More images	The Bogey on a Stick	Formerly in Meriden Park, Chelmsley Wood	1981		Sculpture	Wood			Solihull Metropolitan Borough Council		Removed in 2009. It could return after being restored. As of 2026 all that remains to this date is the stick part. But even that is rotting and could do with a paint.
