= Algar =

Algar may refer to:

== Places ==
- Algar, Cádiz, a city in Andalusia, Spain
- Algar, India, a settlement in Uttara Kannada district, Karnataka, India
- Algar de Mesa, a municipality in the province of Guadalajara, Castile-La Mancha, Spain
- Algar de Palancia, a municipality in the comarca of Camp de Morvedre in the Valencian Community, Spain
- El Algar, a district of the Spanish municipality Cartagena
- Algar do Carvão, an ancient lava tube or volcanic vent in the center of the island of Terceira in the Azores
- Bnied Al-Gar, a suburb of Kuwait City
- Algar Court, an alleyway in Sai Ying Pun, Hong Kong

== People ==
- Ben Algar, an English footballer, who currently plays for F.C. New York
- Hamid Algar, a British-American Professor Emeritus of Persian Studies at the University of California
- James Algar, an American film director, screenwriter, and producer
- Luis Herrero-Tejedor Algar, a Spanish politician and Member of the European Parliament
- Michael Algar, aka Olga, an English guitarist and singer and songwriter
- Niamh Algar, Irish actor
- Ralph Algar, MP
- Algar Howard, a long-serving officer of arms at the College of Arms in London
- Algars Kirkis, a Soviet luger who competed during the late 1970s
- Ælfgar of Selwood, or Algar, a saint venerated at a chapel in Somerset, England
- Algar (thane), one of twenty English thanes in Devonshire who kept their land and titles following the Norman Conquest in 1066

== Companies ==
- Algar Telecom, a Brazilian telecommunications company

== See also ==
- Algar-Flynn-Oyamada reaction, a chemical reaction whereby a chalcone undergoes an oxidative cyclization to form a flavonol
- Ælfgar (disambiguation)
- Algar (or algae jar), a container (usually a glass jar) to cultivate unicellular algae. It consists of pouring water into it and leaving it in the sun so algae form.
