= Shirley, West Midlands =

Coordinates: 52.409°N 1.823°W

Shirley
- Town
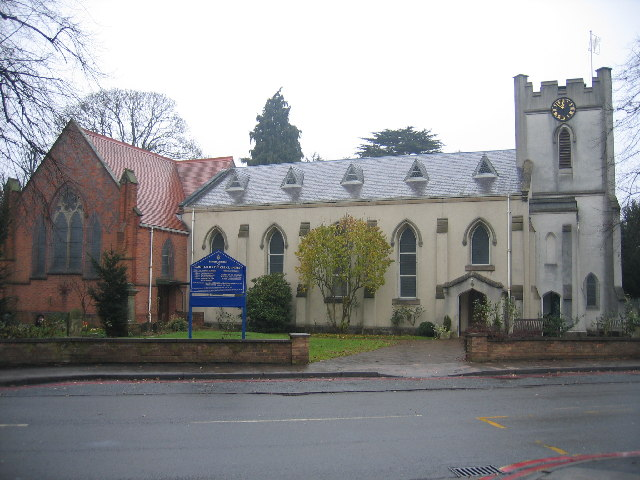
- St. James the Great Church, Stratford Road, Shirley

- Location within the West Midlands
- Population: 35,692 (2011.Wards)
- OS grid reference: SP120790
- Metropolitan borough: Metropolitan Borough of Solihull
- Metropolitan county: West Midlands
- Region: West Midlands
- Country: England
- Sovereign state: United Kingdom
- Post town: Solihull
- Postcode district: B90
- Dialling code: 0121
- Police: West Midlands
- Fire: West Midlands
- Ambulance: West Midlands
- UK Parliament: Solihull West and Shirley

Shirley is a town in the Metropolitan Borough of Solihull, in the West Midlands, England. Historically a rural settlement within the county of Warwickshire, it forms a contiguous urban area with the nearby town of Solihull and the city of Birmingham.

== History ==
The earliest known settlement in the Shirley area was at Berry Mound Camp at what is now Solihull Lodge, in the west of Shirley. This was the site of an Iron Age Hill Fort, which may have been the scene of a battle between the forces of King Alfred and besieged Danes (and with archaeological evidence which would indicate defense of the site during this period).

The site at Berry Mound Camp is a rare example of a univallate hillfort with evidence of a timber revetments and a re-cut V-shaped ditch which demonstrates the importance of this hillfort as a defensive site. The remains of the fortified village, protected by up to three series of earth banks, dating back to the 1st century BC, covered approximately 11 acres (4.5 hectares).

For the majority of the Medieval and Early-Modern period, Shirley was used as farmland and many field patterns remain from this period, particularly to the south of Shirley. It is probable that the majority of the Berry Mound Camp site has been in agricultural use since at least the medieval period. This has eroded many historic features. However, the remains of two banks of earth works can still be seen from the North Worcestershire Path which runs across the site and commences in Aqueduct Road, Major's Green.

During the Early Middle Ages, the Shirley area was part of the Manor of Ulverlei, now Olton, and this remained the case until the establishment of Solihull around 1170–1180, when it became part of the parish of Solihull. It was at the end of the High Middle Ages that the name Shirley was first recorded in the early Thirteenth Century. A reference to the area from 1240, some fifty years after the founding of nearby Solihull, refers to it as 'Syrley', which means 'bright clearing' in old English.

By the Late Middle Ages, Shirley was developing into a small settlement along its main thoroughfare, called Shirley Street. The road name was first recorded in 1322 as 'Schirleystret'. The use of the term Shirley Street was common by 1332. This is now the part of the Stratford Road.

During the early modern Period, Shirley became a stopping-off point for travelers and many of the pubs which remain today, such as the Red Lion and Saracens Head, are situated along this section of highway. Many of these pubs trace their routes back to a wave of expansion of Shirley during the Long Nineteenth Century. Between 1725 and 1872, the Stratford Road was a turnpike road, running to Stratford from Birmingham. The frequency of travel along this route meant that inns sprang up to cater for the needs of travelers. This footfall, combined with the relatively secluded nature of the area, led to ‘sportsmen’ coming in large numbers to indulge in banned pursuits; such as bull-baiting, prize fighting and cock-fighting as well as the drinking and gambling which went alongside it.

With the advent of the Modern period in the early twentieth century, the population of Shirley was approximately 3,000 people. This marked another phase of expansion. Shirley Station was opened by the Great Western Railway on 1 June 1908. This then helped support the relocation of people to the suburbs along the route from Snow Hill railway station to Stratford upon Avon and on to Cheltenham. Along with adoption of the private motor vehicle, it was the railway that has fueled the expansion of Shirley during the twentieth century, particularly during the inter-war and immediate post-war periods. The Jacey Road Estate was built in the 1930s. The developers Joseph Cohen (J.C.) and Ralph & Arnold Silverstone are remembered through local street names.

Shirley had, by the mid-twentieth century, its own council and council house. However, with the parallel rise of Solihull, it became managed underneath the Solihull Council, becoming two district wards: Shirley and Shirley South; the council house has since been demolished. In March 1954, when Solihull became a municipal borough, H.R.H. Princess Margaret presented the borough's charter and the ceremony was held at Shirley's Odeon Cinema.

The Local Government Act 1972 reformed local government in England and Wales, in response to the Redcliffe-Maud Report, creating a two-tier local government system of ‘counties’ and ‘districts’. This established the West Midlands county which came into existence in April 1974, incorporating the metropolitan borough of Solihull and thereby also Shirley.

Shirley was struck by an F0/T1 tornado on 23 November 1981, as part of the record-breaking nationwide tornado outbreak on that day. The tornado affected the Solihull Lodge neighbourhood.

The gateway to Shirley high street was once marked by the 'Powergen’ office building; a 1960s building by Birmingham architect John Madin who also designed the former Birmingham Central Library. In 2015 it became the filming location for a zombie movie starring Glenn Close, ‘The Girl with all the Gifts, before it was demolished in 2017.

In the north of Shirley is a district known as Robin Hood. Contrary to popular local belief, this is not believed by historians to be due to a connection with the English folk hero Robin Hood, but is instead due to a misreading of the original name of the area 'Robin's Wood'. The misread name was adopted by a local public house, and eventually other landmarks in the area such as a farm, a traffic island, a golf course and the Robin Hood Cemetery, eventually becoming the official name for the area.

== Retail ==
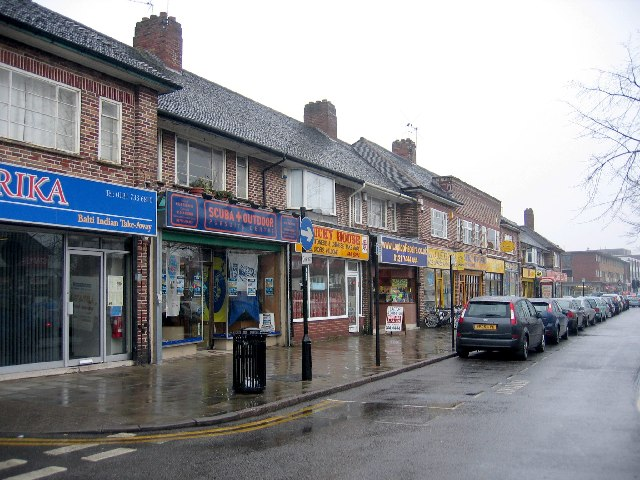
Shops on Stratford Road, Shirley

The historic and current focus for shops and businesses in Shirley is along the A34 Stratford Road. The designated high street comprises a high proportion of independent retailers and charity stores, occupying smaller retail units in predominantly inter-war period properties.

There are several pubs in central Shirley, some of which have occupied several premises on the same sites. The Saracens Head pub, dating back to 1747 as a coaching inn, was where tolls were paid to use the road from Birmingham to Stratford-upon-Avon until 1872. The Red Lion pub, at Red Lion Square, dating back to 1751, is rumoured to be haunted by a poltergeist and there are reports of local people who have witnessed objects falling off shelves. A zeppelin bomb fell in the fields behind the pub in 1917. The Plume of Feathers, which was the site of many local 'sports' and instrumental in the growth of Shirley, was built in the early 1800s at the junction of Bills Lane and Stratford Road.

A significant investment into a new retail-led mixed-use centre is under construction. The 'New Heart for Shirley' was opened in May 2015. Building work on further residential properties are still continuing. Parkgate, as it is known, offers various shops, restaurants and other services such as a gym and the local library.

To the south of the high street (Stratford Road, A34), there are two retail parks; one of which is listed as 'Solihull Gate Retail Park'. Cranmore Retail/Business Park is mainly DIY and tool hire. Along the A34 there are many car dealerships. There are also plans to develop a large industrial park on Blackford Road side of Dog Kennel Lane, occupying the TRW site. An application was made in 2019 to demolish the original TRW headquarters building, which was approved despite objections from the Twentieth Century Society and recognition by Council Officers that it would become an increasingly rare example of buildings of its type.

== Education ==
Shirley School, which was in School Road until the 1970s, was built in 1833.

The only secondary school physically in Shirley is Light Hall School. However Tudor Grange Academy, Alderbrook School, St Peter's School in Solihull and Langley School in Olton have catchment areas that cover parts of Shirley. Tudor Grange became an academy in 2011 and now has a Sixth Form, joining St Peter's Sixth Form. Additionally, the Sixth Form College, Solihull and Solihull College are also major local centres for further education as well as Stratford-upon-Avon College via rail links.

Mill Lodge, Shirley Heath, Hasluck's Green, Peterbrook, Sharman's Cross, Woodlands, Streetsbrook, Blossomfield, Burman, Tudor Grange Primary Academy (Previously named St James's C:E) and Our Lady of the Wayside R.C. are all local primary and infant schools that serve pupils in the Shirley area.

== Leisure ==
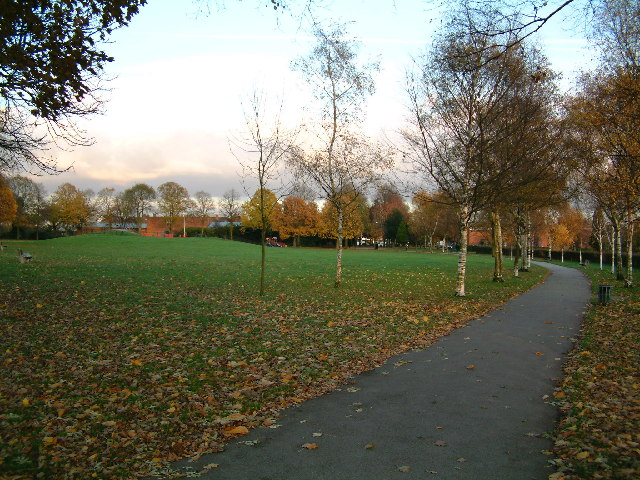
Shirley park, Shirley

Shirley has a public library and park, and some small patches of woodland at Bills Wood and Palmers Rough. There is also the nearby Stratford-upon-Avon Canal which provides a walking route into the Warwickshire countryside. Shirley Community Centre was opened by Princess Anne in 1985.

An annual 'Donkey Derby', a donkey-racing event, has been held in Shirley Park as a community fund-raising event annually since 1970, with the only exception being during the COVID-19 pandemic. The park itself was opened in 1927 by Dr James Coole Kneale as part of the grounds to his house, which stood next to the Saracens Head pub.

For a hundred years from the mid-19th century, Shirley had a racecourse, and this was supplemented by a public lido in Sansome Road, the Odeon Cinema on Stratford Road and the public library in Church Road, all in the 1930s.

== Religion ==
The parish of Shirley was founded in 1934. There are several churches in the Shirley area, with features of local note.

St James Church is the Church of England (CE) parish church for the town. Shirley's reputation in the early nineteenth-century for bull baiting, cockfighting and pugilism is widely speculated to have encouraged the church authorities to start building St James Church in 1831. The church is notable for having the altar placed at the western end, which might have been a mistake but is also referenced locally as being to ensure it was kept away from the location of the disreputable activities nearby, which were centered around the nearby Plume of Feathers Pub, directly opposite the church on the other side of the Stratford Road. The church was enlarged in 1882 and in 1893 Shirley became its own ecclesiastical parish. The church grounds contain several notable graves and a war memorial which was erected in 1921. There are 23 war graves in the grounds and the war memorial is unusual in that it records the loss of an Army Matron, Katy Beaufoy, who died when the hospital ship HMHS Glenart Castle was torpedoed in 1918.

Our Lady of the Wayside is the Roman Catholic (RC) church. It opened as a mass centre in a former house known as 'Heathfield' on Stratford Road, served by the Church of St Augustine in Solihull, in June 1934. The original church, built in 1937, is now the Parish Hall. In 1962, Father Patrick O'Mahony, a notable human rights activist, was appointed parish priest and immediately instigated the building of a larger church on the site of 'Heathfield'. That church is now a Grade II listed building, with a then-innovative fiberglass tower, and was built between 1965–67 to designs by Brian Rush of Rush, Granelli and Partners. It includes glass by Tom Fairs and sculpture by Dame Elisabeth Frink and Walter Ritchie. It contains one of Frink's Risen Christ sculptures as well as brick relief art by Ritchie.

Also located along the Stratford Road (A34) are Shirley Baptist and Shirley Methodist churches.

== Transport ==
There are train services to Birmingham Moor Street, Birmingham Snow Hill and on to Stourbridge Junction in one direction and to Henley-in-Arden and Stratford-upon-Avon in the other direction from Shirley railway station, which is located in Haslucks Green Road. The North Warwickshire Line from Shirley railway station currently only runs as far as Stratford upon Avon railway station; however, the line was a mainline continuing via Honeybourne railway station (which is on the Cotswold Line) as the Honeybourne Line to Cheltenham Spa.

Adjacent to Shirley station is a notable set of historic worker cottages. Immediately beside the station are eight Railway Workers Cottages which the GWR originally provided for railway workers. One of these was occupied for several years by Ted Pierrepoint, the nephew of Albert Pierrepoint, the notable twentieth century executioner. The detached house overlooking the station car park was provided as the GWR Station Master's residence.

The Stratford-upon-Avon Canal skirts the western edge of Shirley, and it is possible to walk along this to Kings Norton four miles (six kilometres) away, or Stratford upon Avon, further in the other direction.

Shirley is also served by several bus routes, including the 4A, 5, 6, 49, and 76, all operated by National Express West Midlands as well as the 27 which is operated by Diamond West Midlands which all stop on the Stratford Road in the town centre. Other services that operate in Shirley include the 664, 665 (operated by Landflight) and X20 (operated by Stagecoach Midlands. Solihull town centre is a 15-minute drive away.

== Notable people ==
There are various notable people who have had connections with Shirley, or who are buried in the area. These include:

- Mandy Rice-Davies, known for the Profumo affair, lived in Blenheim Road and attended Sharmans Cross Junior School; her name is the basis for the eponymous aphorism "Mandy Rice-Davies applies", a rhetorical retort to a self-interested denial.
- Paul Farbrace, former cricketer, Kent and Middlesex player and England assistant coach, currently lives in Shirley.
- Rem Fowler, motorcyclist, winner of the first Isle of Man TT race in 1907, lived in Shirley and is buried at St James' Church.
- Jack Grealish, England footballer, was scouted for Aston Villa at Tythe Barn Lane.
- Richard Hammond, television presenter and journalist, attended Sharmans Cross Junior School.
- Martin Johnson, former England rugby player and captain, lived in Solihull Road and attended Blossomfield Infants School
- Jonathan Manns, urbanist and developer, grew up in Shirley attending Woodlands, St James CE and Shirley Heath schools.
- Nigel Mansell, racing driver who competed in Formula 1, attended Sharmans Cross Comprehensive.
- Janet Parker, medical photographer, the last person to die from smallpox, was cremated at Robin Hood Crematorium in Shirley.
- John Taylor, musician, grew up in Shirley and attended Our Lady of the Wayside.
- Thomas Turrall, soldier, winner of the Victoria Cross, is buried at Robin Hood Cemetery in Shirley.
- Ernest Henry "Chinese" Wilson, plant collector and writer, was raised in Shirley.
- Ossie Wheatley, England cricketer, grew up in Shirley and attended Shirley College.
- Clive-John Payne, broadcaster, presenter and actor, born in Solihull, lived in Dunard Road and attended Burman Infants School, Haslucks Green Junior School and Sharman's Cross Secondary School.
