= Ælfgar =

Ælfgar is an Anglo-Saxon masculine personal name, from ælf "elf" and gar "spear", that may refer to:

- Ælfgar of Lichfield (died c. 947), bishop of Lichfield
- Ælfgar of Elmham (died 1021), bishop of Elmham
- Ælfgar, Earl of Mercia (1030–1062), earl of Mercia
- Ælfgar of Selwood, saint venerated in later medieval Somerset

== See also ==
- Algar
- Alger (name)
- Elgar (disambiguation)
- Ælfgifu
- Wulfgar
