= Spurway, Oakford =

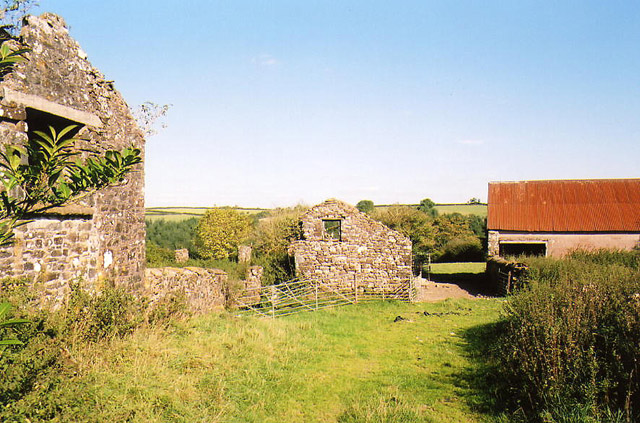
Ruins of farmbuildings at Spurway Barton in 2003

Spurway is a historic manor in the parish of Oakford in Devon. It was the seat of the de Spurway (later Spurway) family from before 1244 until the mid-20th century. The derelict buildings of Spurway Barton are in a remote location above a wooded combe.

== History ==
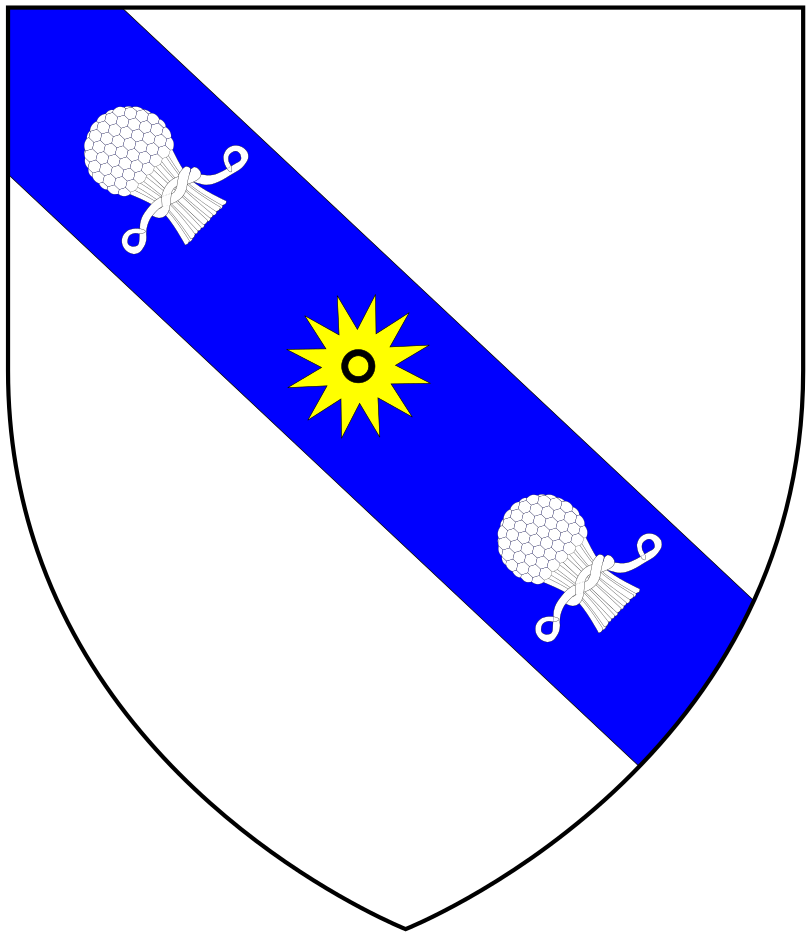
Arms of Spurway of Spurway

Spurway was for several centuries two separate manors, East Spurway and West Spurway.

East Spurway is listed as SPREWE in the Domesday Book of 1086 as one of the 99 Devonshire holdings of Geoffrey de Montbray, Bishop of Coutances, who was one of the tenants-in-chief in Devon of King William the Conqueror. Before the Norman Conquest of 1066 it was held by an Anglo-Saxon named Algar. In the Book of Fees of 1302 it is recorded as a possession of the feudal barony of Barnstaple. In the record of Feudal Aids between 1284-1431 it is listed as Estsprewey, i.e. "East Spurway", held from Geoffrey de Camville (died 1308), feudal baron of Barnstaple, with member estates within the manor listed as Challewille (probably today's "Chawlmoor" Wood and copse) and Falwarigge (today's "Valeridge".

West Spurway is listed as ESPREWEI in the Domesday Book among the 27 Devonshire holdings of Walter of Douai, another of King William's tenants-in-chief. His tenant was Hermer. Before the Norman Conquest of 1066 it was held by an Anglo-Saxon named Wulfric. In the Book of Fees of 1302 it is recorded as held by Ivo de Servinton. This estate is listed in the record of Feudal Aids between 1284-1431 as Westsprewey, held from John de Mandeville of Coker in Somerset.

At some time before 1244 the manor, or perhaps one of the two parts, came into the possession of the Spurway family which remained seated there until the middle of the 20th century.

== Sources ==
- Thorn, Caroline & Frank, (eds.) Domesday Book Vol. 9: Devon, Parts 1 & 2, Phillimore Press, Chichester, 1985.
