= Chelsea Weston =

English footballer

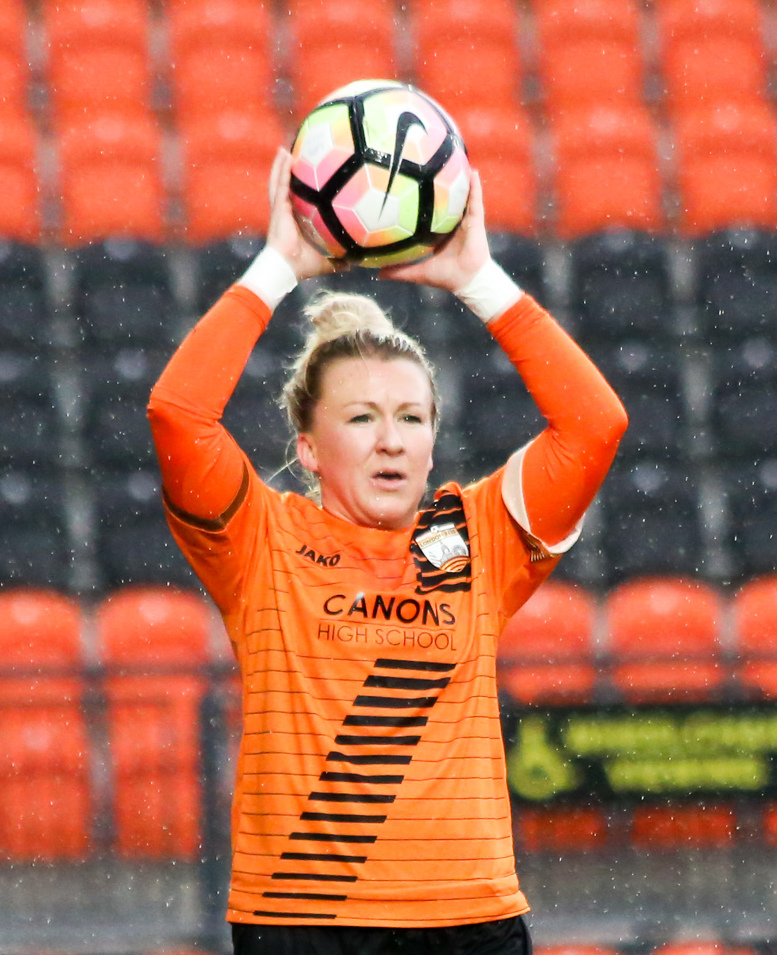
- Weston playing for London Bees in January 2018

Personal information
- Full name: Chelsea Elisabeth Weston
- Date of birth: 27 January 1990 (age 36)
- Place of birth: Worcester, England
- Height: 1.62 m (5 ft 4 in)
- Position: Defender

Team information
- Current team: Pink Bari
- Number: 30

Youth career
- Droitwich Diamonds
- Birmingham City

Senior career*
Years	Team	Apps	(Gls)
2005–2008	Birmingham City		
2008–2010	Doncaster Rovers Belles		
2011–2015	Birmingham City	53	(4)
2016–2017	Notts County		
2017–2018	London Bees	13	(0)
2019–2020	Coventry United	15	(1)
2020–	Pink Bari	7	(0)

International career
2007–2008	England U-17	3	(1)
- * Club domestic league appearances and goals as of 26 November 2020

Chelsea Elisabeth Weston (born 27 January 1990) is an English footballer who plays as a defender for Pink Bari in the Italian Serie A. She has represented England up to Under-23 level.

== Club career ==
Weston, of Warndon, began playing football for a local boys team, the Droitwich Kestrels and remained with them until reaching the maximum age for mixed football teams. Her struggle to find a team to play for saw her featured on BBC Midlands Today where she was spotted by Birmingham City Ladies. She joined their junior side and progressed to play in their Premier League team.

Weston left to join Doncaster Rovers Belles in the 2008 close season. In February 2009 she played in the Belles 5–0 defeat against Arsenal Ladies in the FA Women's Premier League Cup Final.

In December 2010, Weston was revealed to have signed for Birmingham City Ladies' FA WSL squad. In January 2016 Birmingham manager David Parker revealed that the club had rejected its option to extend Weston's contract, making her a free agent.

On 18 March 2016, Notts County Ladies confirmed the signing of Weston.

Weston picked up an ACL injury and prior to recovery, Notts County Ladies were folded.

She signed for London Bees in September 2017 and made her debut the following month.

== International career ==
Weston has represented England at Under-17, Under-19, and Under-20 level. In 2008, she played for England's Under-20 team in the FIFA Under-20's World Cup Finals in Chile. In 2009, she was a key player as England's Under-19s side won the UEFA European Women's Under-19 Championship in Belarus, scoring against Sweden in the group stages. She was named as one of ten 'emerging talents' from the tournament on the UEFA website.

== Personal life ==
Weston attended Elgar Technology College and Worcester Sixth Form College, before enrolling on a sports science degree at Loughborough University, on a talented athlete scholarship.

== Honours ==
=== Birmingham City ===
- FA Women's Cup (1): 2011–12
