= Elgar (disambiguation) =

Edward Elgar (1857–1934) was an English romantic composer.

Elgar may also refer to:

== Surname ==
- Alice Elgar (1848–1920), English poet and author, wife of Edward Elgar
- Avril Elgar (1932–2021), British actress
- Dean Elgar (born 1987), South African cricketer
- Ella Elgar (1869–1945), New Zealand socialite and art collector
- Francis Elgar (1845–1909), naval architect
- Rebecca Elgar, English children's book illustrator and writer
- Sybil Elgar (1914–2007), British educator

== Given name ==
- Elgar Fleisch (born 1968), Austrian/Swiss academic
- Elgar Howarth (1935–2025), English composer and conductor
- Elgar Watts (born 1985), South African rugby union player

== Other uses ==
- Edward Elgar Publishing, global publisher of academic works
- Elgar (film), a 1962 drama documentary
- Elgar Technology College, a defunct school in Worcester, Worcestershire, England
- Elgar Uplands, Alexander Island, Antarctica
- Elgar, a villain in Power Rangers: Turbo
- Elgar, a 2020 album by British cellist Sheku Kanneh-Mason

== See also ==
- Elger (disambiguation)
- Ælfgar
