= Shirley Baptist Church =

Shirley Baptist Church may refer to one or more Baptist churches:

- Shirley Baptist Church, Southampton, UK
- Shirley Baptist Church, Solihull, UK
