= Villel de Mesa =

Villel de Mesa, Spain
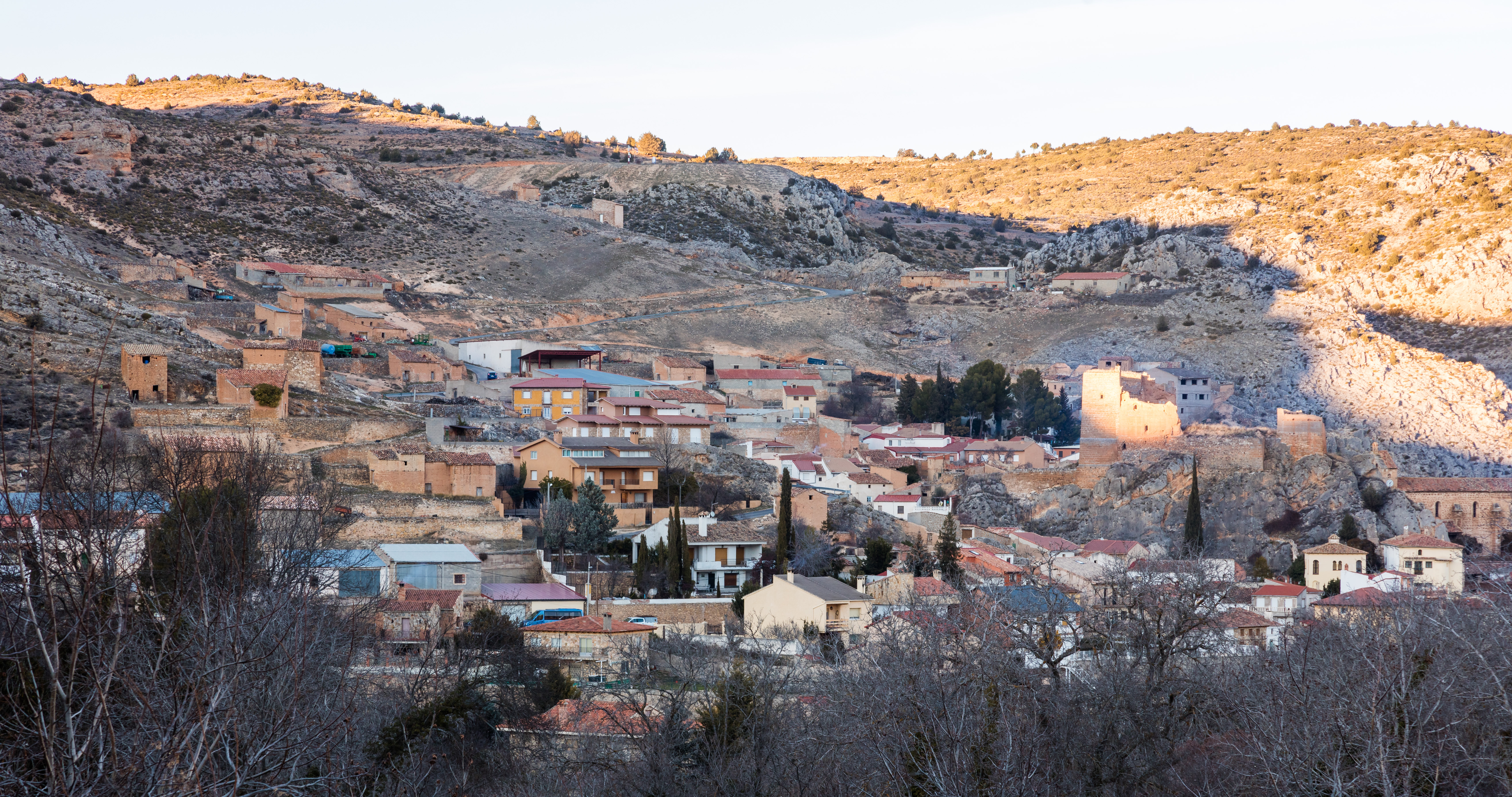

- Location within Province of Guadalajara Location within Castilla-La Mancha Location within Spain
- Coordinates: 41°07′38″N 1°59′22″W
- Country: Spain
- Autonomous community: Castile-La Mancha
- Province: Guadalajara
- Municipality: Villaseca de Uceda

Population (2023)
  - Total: 164
- Time zone: UTC+1 (CET)
  - Summer (DST): UTC+2 (CEST)

Villel de Mesa is a municipality in the province of Guadalajara, in the autonomous community of Castile-La Mancha, Spain.

With a permanent population of 164, Villel de Mesa is the main village of the Mesa Valley in the province of Guadalajara. The other villages belonging to Guadalajara in the valley are Mochales and Algar de Mesa.
