= Selwood, Somerset =

Civil parish in Somerset, England

Coordinates: 51.21°N 2.32°W

Selwood
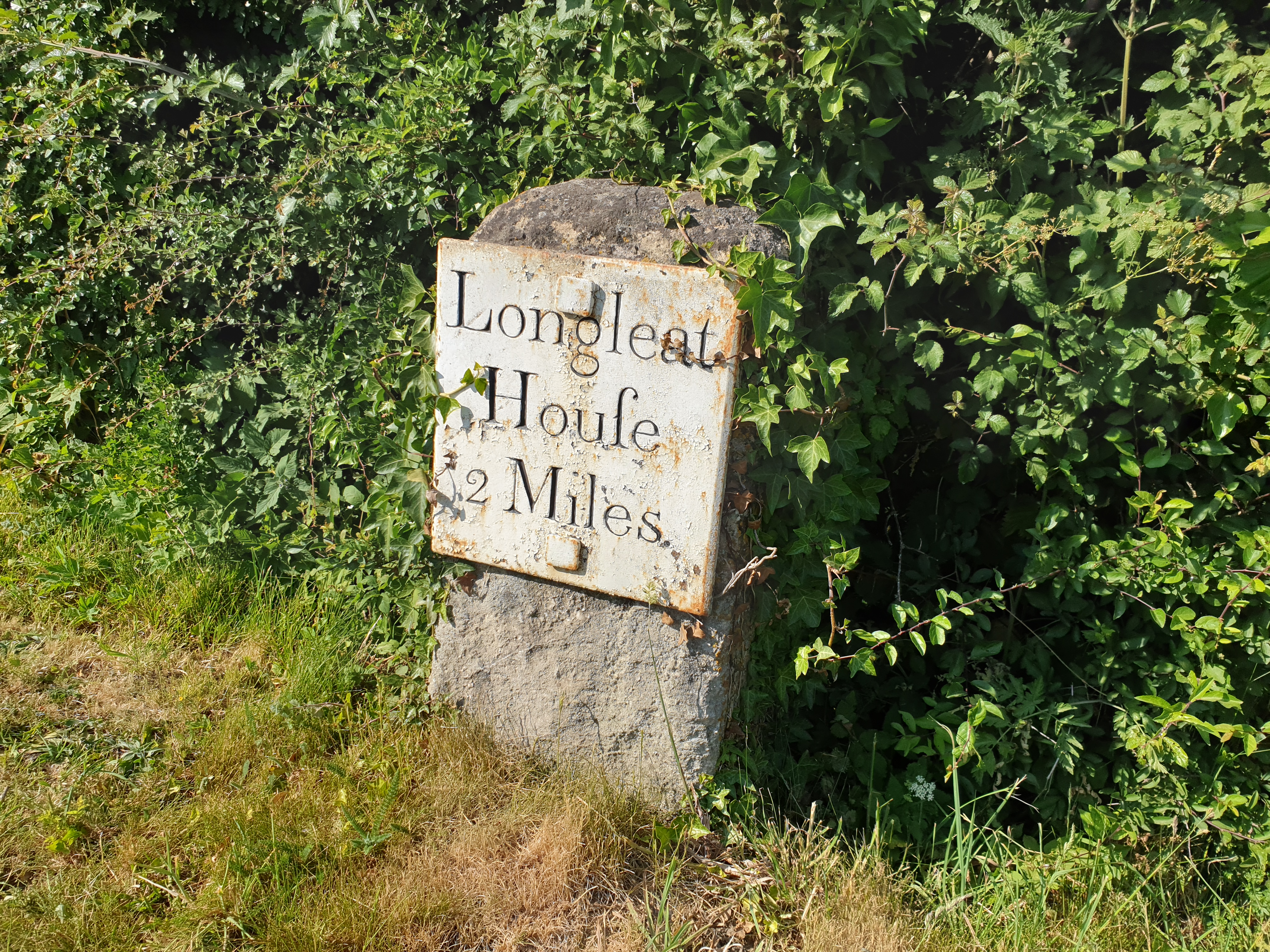
- Milestone at East Woodlands, near the toll house, erected by the Frome Turnpike Trust. The square design is known as 'Frome Square Plate'

- Location within Somerset
- Population: 798 (2011)
- OS grid reference: ST780457
- Civil parish: Selwood
- Unitary authority: Somerset
- Ceremonial county: Somerset
- Region: South West
- Country: England
- Sovereign state: United Kingdom
- Post town: FROME
- Postcode district: BA11
- Dialling code: 01373
- Police: Avon and Somerset
- Fire: Devon and Somerset
- Ambulance: South Western
- UK Parliament: Frome and East Somerset

Selwood is a civil parish in Somerset, England, which takes its name from the ancient Selwood Forest. The parish almost entirely surrounds the town of Frome, and includes the villages of East Woodlands, West Woodlands and Rodden, and the hamlets of Alder Row and Blatchbridge. In 2011 the parish had a population of 798.

== History ==
Roddenbury Hillfort is a univallate Iron Age hillfort. It is a Scheduled Ancient Monument and on the Heritage at Risk Register.

The ancient Selwood Forest stretched approximately between Gillingham in Dorset and Chippenham in Wiltshire. Between the eighth and early eleventh centuries it was an important boundary between east and west Wessex, and in 705 the bishopric of Sherborn was established for those "west of Selwood". Only a few fragments of the forest now survive.

The area was part of the hundred of Frome. The civil parish was created in 1894 from the outlying rural parts of the ancient parish of Frome which lay outside the urban district of Frome. In 1901, an area containing 201 houses was transferred back to Frome, and in 1933 the parish was enlarged by the abolition of Rodden parish, a rural area to the east of the town.

== Governance ==
The parish council has responsibility for local issues, including setting an annual precept (local rate) to cover the council's operating costs and producing annual accounts for public scrutiny. The parish council evaluates local planning applications and works with the local police, district council officers, and neighbourhood watch groups on matters of crime, security, and traffic. The parish council's role also includes initiating projects for the maintenance and repair of parish facilities, as well as consulting with the district council on the maintenance, repair, and improvement of highways, drainage, footpaths, public transport, and street cleaning. Conservation matters (including trees and listed buildings) and environmental issues are also the responsibility of the council.

Until 2023, the parish was in the Non-metropolitan district of Mendip, which was formed on 1 April 1974 under the Local Government Act 1972, having previously been part of Frome Rural District.

Somerset Council is responsible for running the largest and most expensive local services such as education, social services, libraries, main roads, public transport, policing and fire services, trading standards, waste disposal and strategic planning.

It is also part of the Frome and East Somerset county constituency represented in the House of Commons of the Parliament of the United Kingdom. It elects one Member of Parliament (MP) by the first past the post system of election.

== Landmarks ==
Manor Farmhouse in West Woodlands provides a particularly good survival of 17th century interior features in a very fine state of preservation, while St. Algars Farmhouse (named after Ælfgar of Selwood) dates from the 14th century. In Rodden, the Manor House dates from the late 16th century. The Grade II Listed building, with 10 bedrooms, was used as an almshouse in the 18th and 19th centuries; it has been restored and is a private residence.

== Religious sites ==
The Church of All Saints in Rodden dates from 1640, and was rebuilt in the mid 19th century.

The church in East Woodlands was completed in 1714 having been paid for by the Longleat estate, then patrons of the parish. It is now dedicated to St Katharine. It was extensively restored in the 1870s by J. L. Pearson, the architect who also designed Truro Cathedral.
