= Tudor Grange Academy, Worcester =

Secondary school in Worcester, England

Tudor Grange Academy Worcester

Location
- Bilford Road; Worcester, Worcestershire, WR3 8HN; England; 52.2130°N 2.2116°W

Information
- Type: Academy
- Established: 2009
- Department for Education URN: 135913 Tables
- Ofsted: Reports
- Chair of Governors: Peter Rock
- Principal: David Butler
- Gender: Coeducational
- Age: 11 to 18
- Enrolment: 1050
- Houses: 5 (Angelou, Turing, Attenborough, Keller and Ashe)
- Website: http://www.worcs.tgacademy.org.uk/

Tudor Grange Academy Worcester is a mixed secondary school in Worcester, Worcestershire, England. It occupies the site of the former Elgar Technology College that was disbanded following its inability to improve under the special measures received from Ofsted. Tudor Grange Academy Trust then sponsored the school, renamed it after the Solihull school named "Tudor Grange Academy Solihull" and heavily renovated the site. The new academy was established in 2009 and was the second academy school of its type to be set up in England, opening for the new school year in September. Work on refurbishing the buildings was scheduled to begin in April 2011, to be supervised by the Worcester Council Children's Services Department, and was expected to be completed in early 2013. Some of the new premises were expected to be ready for student use by late 2012.

Sponsored by Tudor Grange Academy, Solihull, and entirely funded by The Department for Education, the academy supports local communities in its catchment area of the northern half of the city of Worcester and it suburbs, serving the same area as the former Elgar Technology College. The first head teacher is Claire Maclean, the former deputy head of the Technology College.

== Curriculum ==
The school provides the National Curriculum including GCSE, A Level, and BTEC level 3 Higher Diplomas, including Sport and Performing Arts delivered in partnership with The University of Worcester. The school has a Science and Enterprise specialisation, and also has extensive sports facilities which include a new sports hall, four badminton courts, indoor netball court, basketball court, volleyball court, and five a side football pitch. The academy comprises five colleges: Angelou, Turing, Attenborough, Keller and Ashe.
