= Oakford, Devon =

Village in Devon, England

Coordinates: 50.9814°N 3.5535°W

Oakford
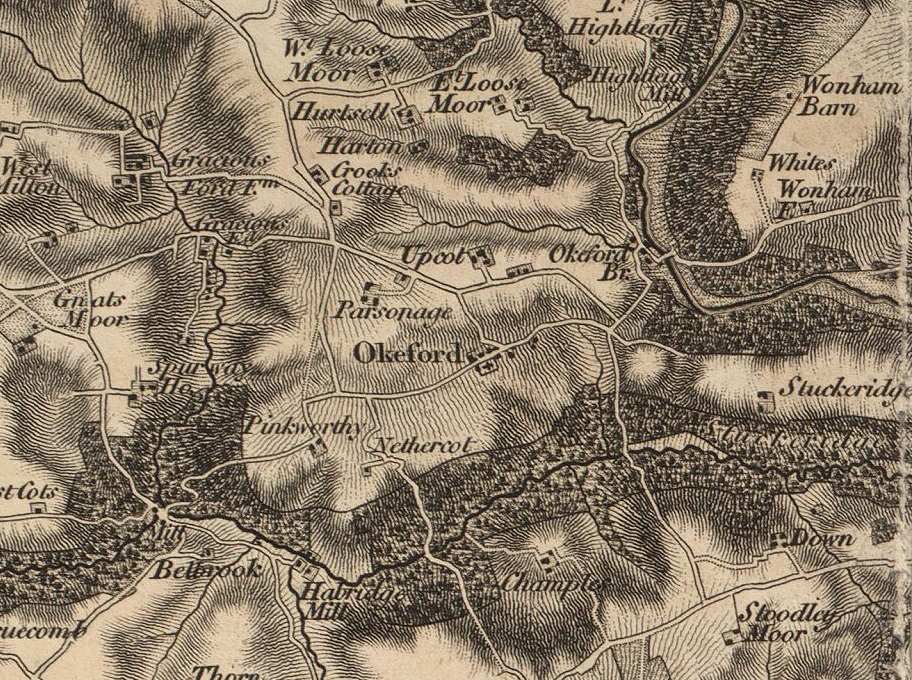
- Oakford 19th century map

- Location within Devon
- OS grid reference: SS9102521393
- Civil parish: Oakford
- District: Mid Devon
- Shire county: Devon
- Region: South West
- Country: England
- Sovereign state: United Kingdom
- Post town: TIVERTON
- Postcode district: EX16
- Dialling code: 01398
- Police: Devon and Cornwall
- Fire: Devon and Somerset
- Ambulance: South Western
- UK Parliament: Tiverton and Minehead

Oakford is a village and civil parish in the Mid Devon district of Devon, England. It is located three miles (5 km) south west of Bampton and eight miles (13 km) north north west of Tiverton. Oakford is near the river Exe.

In 1870, John Marius Wilson's Imperial Gazetteer of England and Wales described Oakford thus:

OAKFORD, a village and a parish in Tiverton district, Devon. The village stands on a bold acclivity, adjacent to a tributary of the river Exe, 2 miles S of the boundary with Somerset, 3 W S W of Bampton, and 6½ N N W of Tiverton r. station; is large and straggling. The parish comprises 5, 464acres."

== Population ==
It had a population of 358 according to the 2011 census with 185 being Males and 173 being Female.

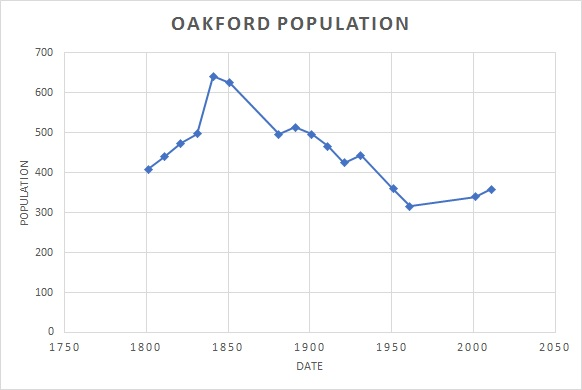

The 1831 census provides information, down to parish-level, on the occupations of males aged over 20 using nine categories. Here we reorganise this information to provide a crude measure of social status, based more on contemporary ideas than on modern definitions of social class: "middling sorts" combines small farmers not employing labourers with both masters and skilled workers in urban manufacturing and handicrafts.

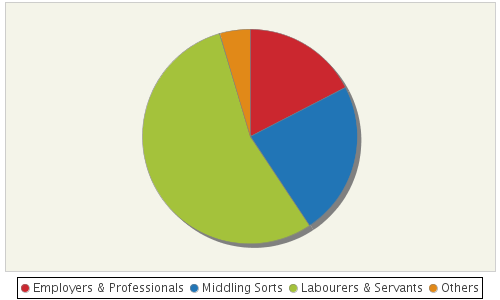
Social Status, based on 1831 occupational statistics

According to the 2011 census, 32% of those who are economically active in Oakford are self-employed; this is nearly twice the district statistics and over 3 times higher than the country's average.

== History ==
Oakford church (St. Peter) dominates the village from an eminence. The porch, nave, cancel and vestry were rebuilt in 1838-9, except for the 15th-century tower, with a spacious nave and short chancel. The tower houses eight bells, said to have exceptional tone, cast by Mears of London in 1825 and given to the church by the then rector, the Rev James Parkin. He also presented the organ, built by J. R. Mortimore of Tiverton, in 1841.

Oakford is located within Mid Devon local authority area. Historically it formed part of Witheridge Hundred. It falls within Tiverton Deanery for ecclesiastical purposes. The Deaneries are used to arrange the typescript Church Notes of B. F. Cresswell, which are held in the Devon Heritage Centre. The population was 480 in 1801 484 in 1901.

=== Historic estates ===
Various historic estates are situated within the parish of Oakford including:

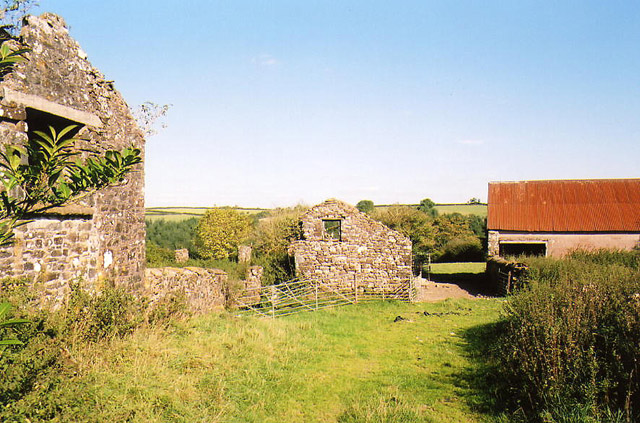
Oakford, Spurway Barton - geograph.org.uk - 88147

- Spurway; Spurway Barton lies remote above a wooded combe and was a Domesday manor. The Spurways were already settled here in 1244 and continued to own it until the mid-20th century.
- Other estates listed in Domesday are Bickham Barton, Mildon, Woodburn and East and West Tapps.

== Education ==
There is no school in Oakford. The nearest primary school is the Church of England School in Bampton, for ages 3–11. There are 8 primary schools within 6 miles (10 km) of Oakford.

Oakford has 3 types of secondary school within 7 miles (11 km). The closest is a special school, Acorn, at Knowstone near South Molton. Tiverton High School is the second nearest (Maintained school) and Blundell's school is the nearest Independent School. These secondary schools all cater for ages 11–16. Blundell's caters up to age 18.

The Pyncombe Educational Foundation helps pupils to advance their education and otherwise promotes education of boys and girls in the beneficial area. It was set up in 1998 through the amalgamation of several Oakford Village Charities. The Foundation awards grants of £150 to help with purchase of books and equipment to any young person who lives in Oakford, or who has lived here within the last year, and is continuing with further education. The award is made in September and is given directly to the person concerned.

== Housing ==
According to the 2011 census, 49.1% of accommodations in Oakford are owned outright with 32.9% of accommodation being owned with a mortgage or loan; these figure are higher than both regional and country statistics. There are 161 households.

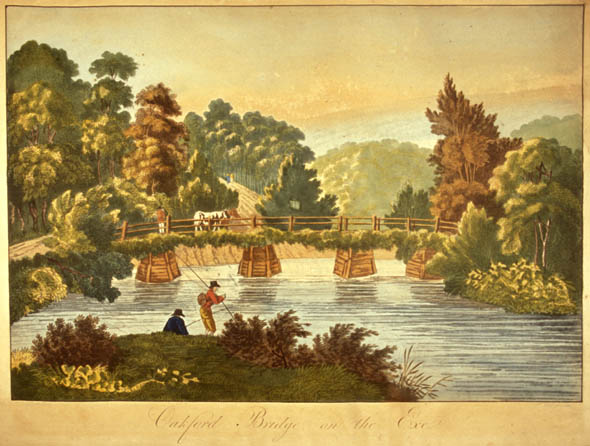
Illustration of Oakford Bridge
