= Shefali Chowdhury =

British actress (born 1988)

- শেফালি চৌধুরী
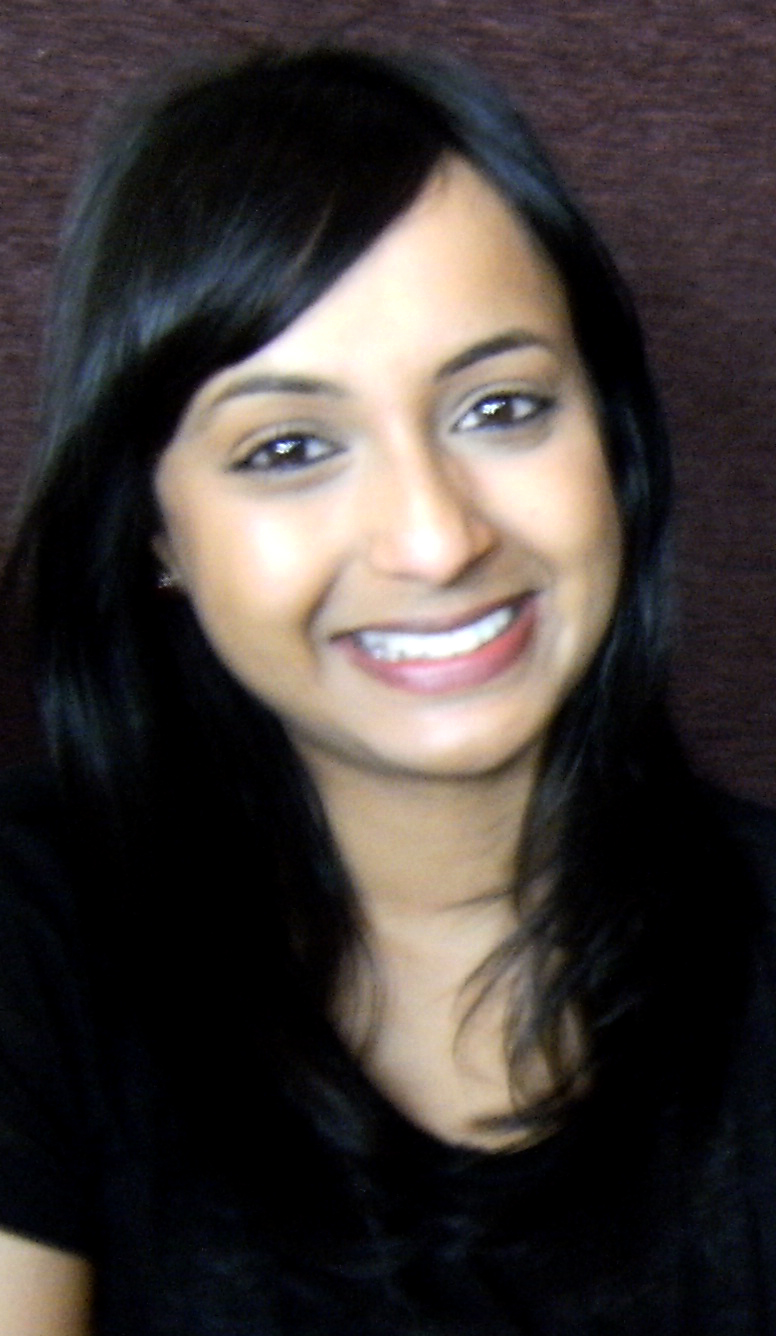
- Chowdhury in or before June 2010
- Born: 20 June 1988 (age 38); Denbigh, Denbighshire, Wales, United Kingdom
- Education: Solihull Sixth Form College; Birmingham City University
- Occupation: Actress
- Years active: 2002–2019
- Known for: Role of Parvati Patil in Harry Potter

Shefali Chowdhury (Bengali: শেফালি চৌধুরী; Bengali pronunciation: [ʃefali tʃoudʱuri]; born 20 June 1988) is a British actress best known for playing the role of Parvati Patil in the fourth, fifth, and sixth films in the Harry Potter film series.

== Career ==
Chowdhury is known for her performances as Parvati Patil in three of the Harry Potter films, starting with 2005's Harry Potter and the Goblet of Fire. She acquired the role when she was in her last year at the Waverley School in Birmingham. She and Afshan Azad, who played the character of Chowdhury's twin sister Padma Patil, are also good friends, according to Azad.

== Filmography ==
Year	Title	Role	Notes
2002	Kannathil Muthamittal	Refugee	Uncredited role
2005	Harry Potter and the Goblet of Fire	Parvati Patil	
2007	Harry Potter and the Order of the Phoenix	Parvati Patil	
2009	Harry Potter and the Half-Blood Prince	Parvati Patil	
2015	I Am the Doorway	Freida	Short film
2015	Heist: Jane	Jane	Short film
2019	Odilo Fabian (or The Possibility of Impossible Dreams)	The Doctor	Short film

== See also ==
- British Bangladeshi
- List of British Bangladeshis
- List of Harry Potter cast members
