= St James the Great, Shirley =

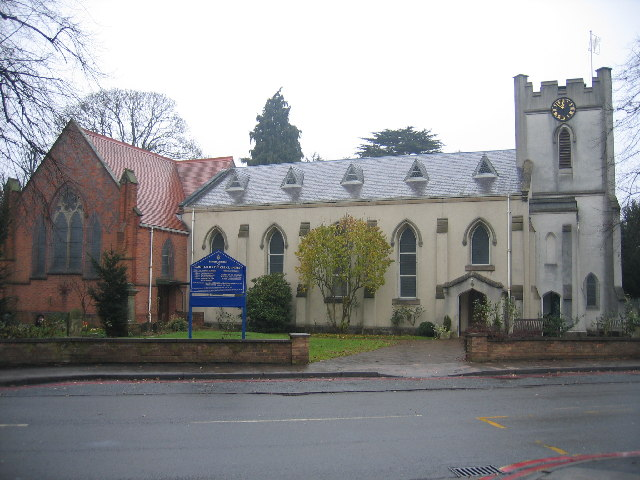
- St James the Great, Shirley
- St James the Great, Shirley
- 52°24′22.25″N 1°49′35.41″W
- OS grid reference: SP 11950 78816
- Location: Shirley, West Midlands
- Country: England
- Denomination: Church of England
- Website: http://shirleyparishb90.co.uk

Architecture
- Heritage designation: Grade II listed
- Groundbreaking: 1831

Administration
- Diocese: Anglican Diocese of Birmingham
- Archdeaconry: Birmingham
- Deanery: Shirley
- Parish: Shirley

Clergy
- Vicar: Rev Paul Day

St James the Great, Shirley is a Grade II listed parish church in the town of Shirley in Metropolitan Borough of Solihull in the West Midlands, England. It is part of the Anglican Diocese of Birmingham.

== History ==
St James Church was started in 1831 and enlarged in 1882. In 1893, Shirley became its own ecclesiastical parish.

The church is in a joint parish with:

- St John the Divine, Tidbury Green
- Christ the King, Shirley
