= Julian Eastoe =

British chemist

- Education: University of East Anglia
- Scientific career
- Workplaces: University of Bristol; Durham University
- Thesis: Influence of pressure on the structure and stability of microemulsions (1990)
- Doctoral advisor: Prof Brian Robinson

Julian Grahame Eastoe (born January 1965) is Emeritus Professor of Chemistry at the University of Bristol. His research interests span colloid and interface science, surfactant chemistry and applications of neutron scattering.

== Biography ==
Eastoe was educated at the British School of Brussels, Belgium, Solihull Sixth Form College and the University of East Anglia (BSc Chemistry, 1986; PhD, 1990).

Eastoe joined the Durham University in 1992, before moving to Bristol in 1993. He has been a professor there since 2004.

== Awards and honours ==
He was awarded the Rideal Medal from the Royal Society of Chemistry and Society for Chemical Industry in 2007 for "distinction in colloid or interface science", and the 2015 ECIS-Solvay medal from the European Colloid and Interface Society “for original scientific work of outstanding quality". In 2026 he was honored with the Kash Mittal award for “expanding understanding of surfactant structure-activity relationships”.

He is co-Editor-in-Chief of the Journal of Colloid and Interface Science.

He has an h-index of 80 according to Google Scholar.
