= Bills Wood =

Park in Solihull, West Midlands, England

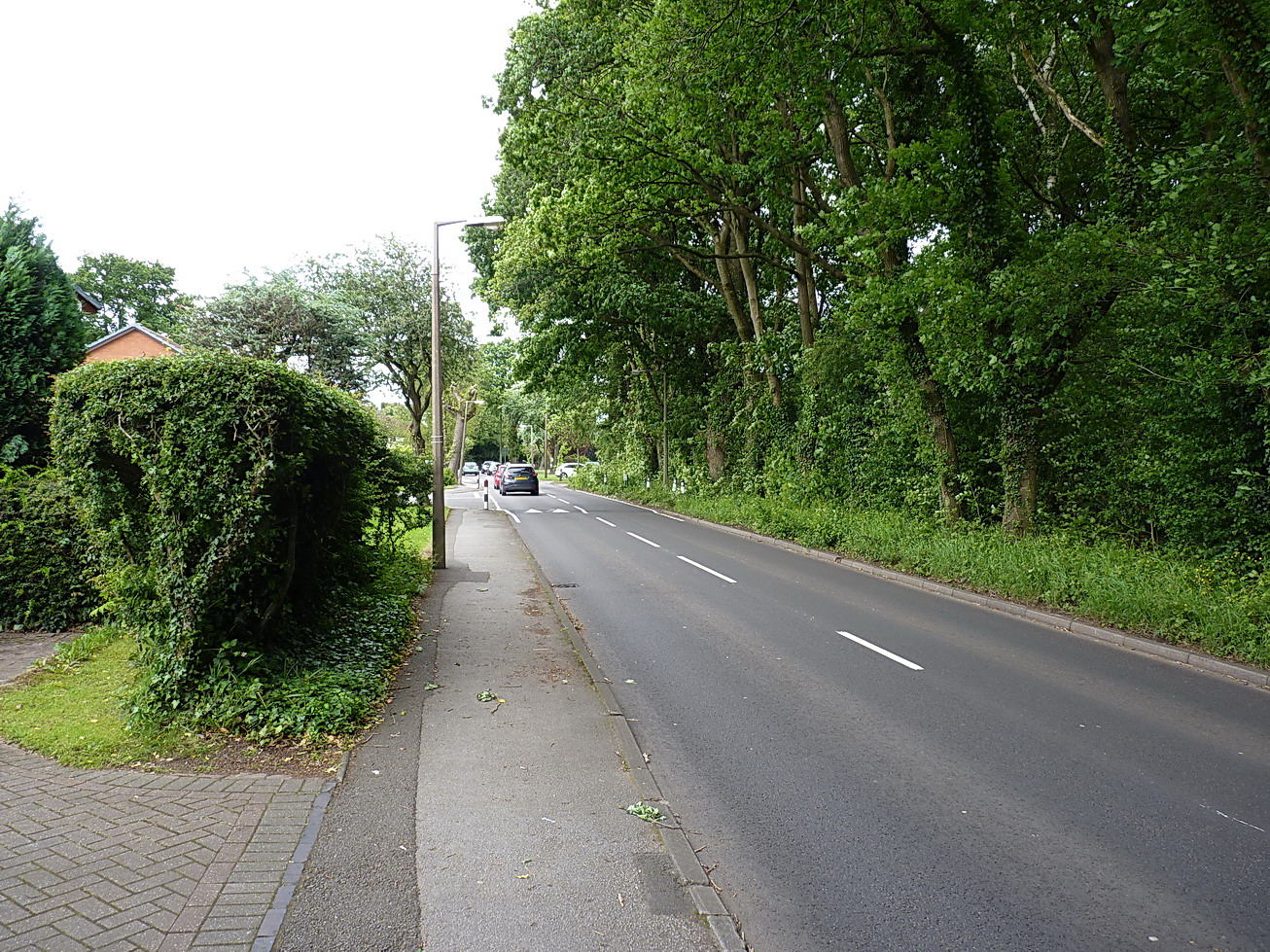
- Bills Lane alongside Bills Wood

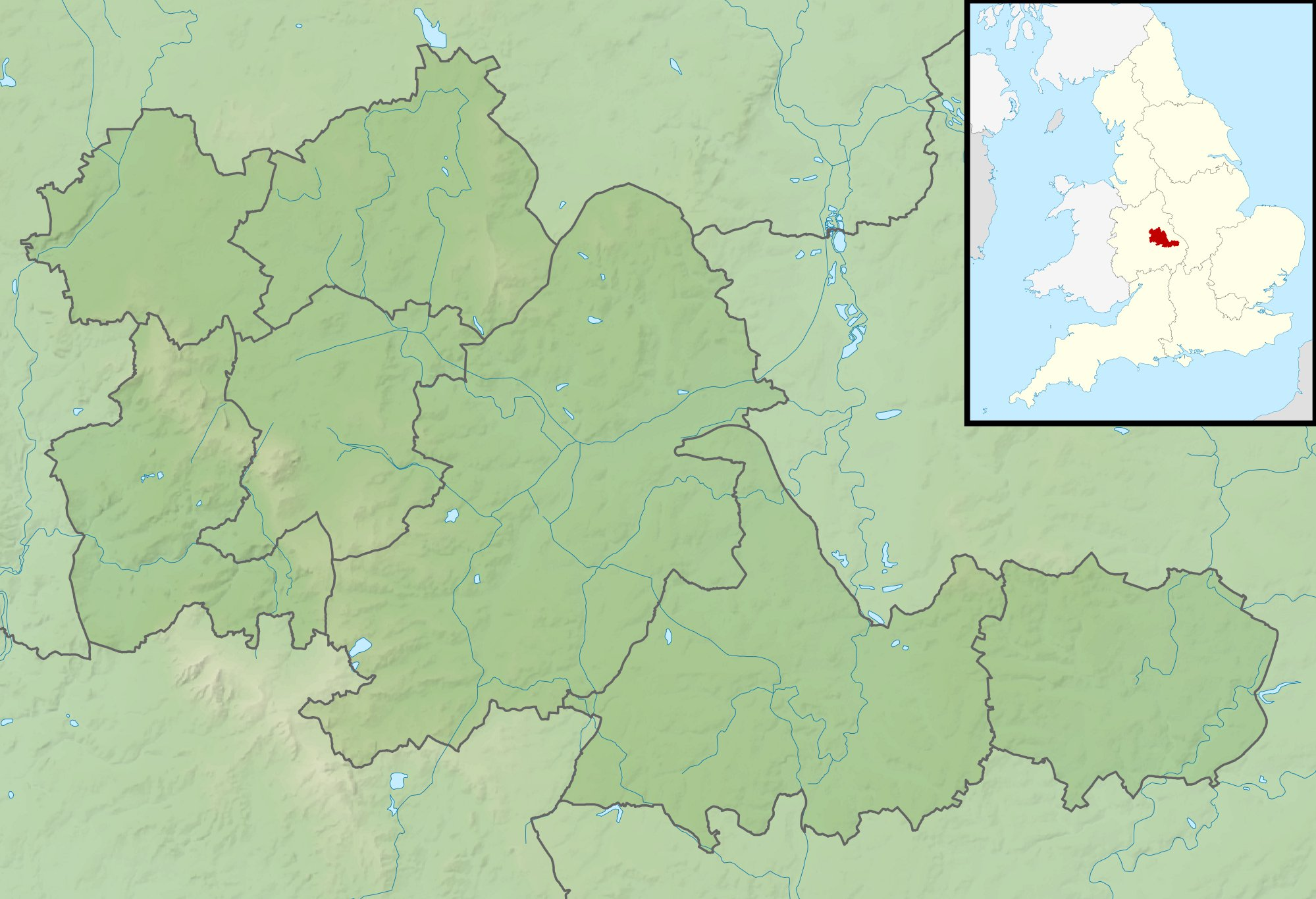
- Location within West Midlands county
- Interactive map of Bills Wood
- Type: Public park
- Location: Solihull, England
- Coordinates: 52°24′03″N 1°50′07″W
- Area: 6.6 hectares (16 acres)
- Operator: Solihull Council
- Status: Open year round

Bills Wood is a local nature reserve and park located in Shirley, Solihull. It covers an area of approximately 6.6 hectares (16 acres) and consists of a square parcel of woodland surrounded by residential suburbs. To the east the wood is bounded by the school playing fields of Light Hall School. A wide range of plants and animals makes the wood an important urban space, and was therefore granted local nature reserve status in 1991.

== Nature ==
The woodland is a mixed broadleaved woodland, with predominantly mature Oak trees dominating the main canopy, along with sycamore and ash. The woodland also has an understorey of holly and hawthorn, with some ash, rowan and hazel. At ground level there is mainly bamble and ivy with some bluebells and bracken. There are occasional banks and ditches that divide the woodland in places, and signs of previous coppicing, in particular there is an old bank and ditch along the east side of the wood with some old oak coppice. The wood is included on the Ancient Woodland Inventory, as compiled by the Nature Conservancy Council.

== See also ==
- List of local nature reserves in England
