= Blatchbridge =

Hamlet in Somerset, England

Coordinates: 51°12′37″N 2°19′04″W

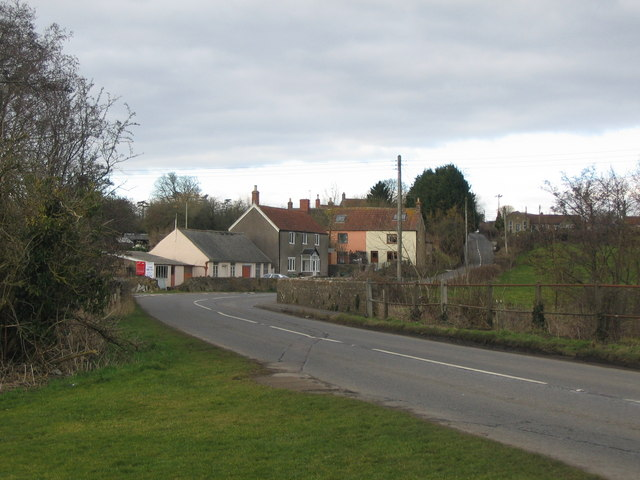
Blatchbridge

Blatchbridge is a hamlet within the civil parish of Selwood in Somerset, England, on the B3092 road from Frome to Maiden Bradley.

It formerly had a blacksmith's shop, on the Frome side of the River Frome. It has a public house called the Cross Keys, which was built in the early 19th century and has been designated as a Grade II listed building.

A former Methodist chapel, now converted to a private dwelling, is halfway up the hill towards Frome.
