= Ælfgifu =

Ælfgifu (also spelled Ælfgyfu; Elfgifa, Elfgiva, Elgiva) is an Anglo-Saxon feminine personal name, from ælf "elf" and gifu "gift". When Emma of Normandy, the mother of Edward the Confessor, became queen of England in 1002, she was given the native Anglo-Saxon name of Ælfgifu to be used in formal and official contexts.

Latinized forms of the name include forms such as Aelueua, Alueua, Alueue, Elgiva, Elueua, Aluiua, and Aueue, among others.

Specific people named Ælfgifu:

- Ælfgifu of Exeter, Anglo-Saxon saint
- Ælfgifu of Northampton, first wife of King Cnut the Great. Her name became Álfífa in Old Norse.
- Ælfgifu of Shaftesbury, wife of King Edmund I of England
- Ælfgifu of York, first wife of Æthelred the Unready
- Ælfgifu, wife of Eadwig, king of England
- Emma of Normandy, adopted the name Ælfgifu upon her marriage to Æthelred the Unready
- Ælfgifu, wife of Ælfgar, Earl of Mercia
- Ælfgifu, daughter of Godwin, Earl of Wessex, and sister of King Harold II of England
- Ælfgifu, daughter of Æthelred the Unready and wife of Uhtred, Earl of Northumbria
- Ælfgyva (another Latinized version of the name), a woman of unknown identity depicted in the Bayeux Tapestry

== See also ==
- Ælfgar
- Eadgifu
