= Selwood Forest =

Area of ancient forest in England

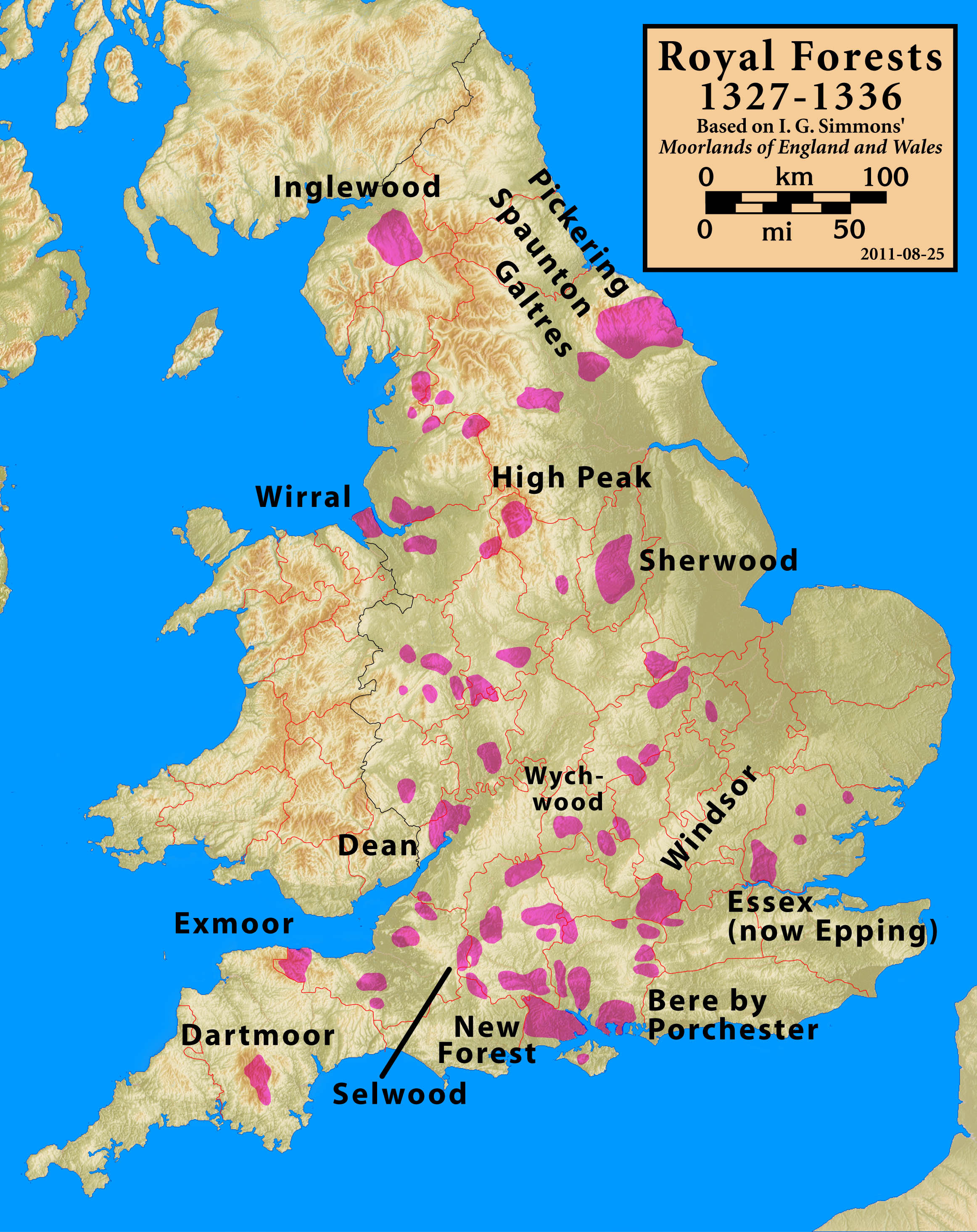

The ancient Selwood Forest ran approximately between Gillingham in Dorset and Chippenham in Wiltshire. It is described by the historian Barbara Yorke as a "formidable natural obstacle" in the Anglo-Saxon period, which was a significant boundary between east and west Wessex. It may earlier have been a negotiated frontier between Wessex and the British kingdom of Dumnonia which was important in the later development of the West Saxon shires, and later boundaries between Wiltshire and Somerset and north Dorset run through the forest. The boundaries through the forest and Bokerley Dyke which separated Somerset and Dorset from eastern counties may date to the fifth or sixth centuries. Selwood's importance as a boundary was also recognised in 705 when the bishopric of Sherborne was established for those "west of Selwood".

In 855 King Æthelwulf appointed his son Æthelbald to act as king while he went on pilgrimage to Rome, and when he returned the next year Æthelbald refused to give up the throne. Asser, who strongly disapproved of Æthelbald's conduct, stated that the plot was hatched by Æthelbald and his co-conspirators, the bishop of Sherborne and the ealdorman of Somerset, "in the western part of Selwood". Their motives are not known, but one factor may have been resentment of western nobles at the favour Æthelwulf had shown to Winchester and its bishop in eastern Wessex.

Alfred the Great rallied his forces against the Viking Great Heathen Army in Selwood 878. According to Asser's Life of King Alfred:

In the seventh week after Easter [4-10 May], he rode to the Egbert's Stone, which is in the eastern part of Selwood Forest (Sylva Magna ['great wood'] in Latin and Coit Mawr in Welsh); and there all the inhabitants of Somerset and Wiltshire, and all the inhabitants of Hampshire those who had not sailed overseas for fear of the Vikings – joined up with him.

The Anglo-Saxon Chronicle refers to Selwood in describing the gathering of English forces to oppose a Viking attack in 893:

Then Ealdorman Æthelred and Ealdorman Æthelhelm and Ealdorman Æthelnoth, and the king's thegns who were then at home at the fortifications assembled from every burh east of the Parret, and both east and west of Selwood, and also north of the Thames and west of the Severn, and also some part of the Welsh people.

Wessex was divided between two ealdormanries in the tenth century and Selwood marked the boundary between them, but it lost its importance when Godwin was appointed earl of all Wessex around 1020.

Today only a few surviving areas of ancient woodland, none of great size, are considered to survive from the medieval Selwood. One such area is Picket Wood at Yarnbrook.

== See also ==
- Ælfgar of Selwood
- Penselwood, a village on the edge of Selwood Forest
- Selwood, Somerset, a parish which takes its name from Selwood Forest
