= Palmers Rough =

Park in Solihull, England

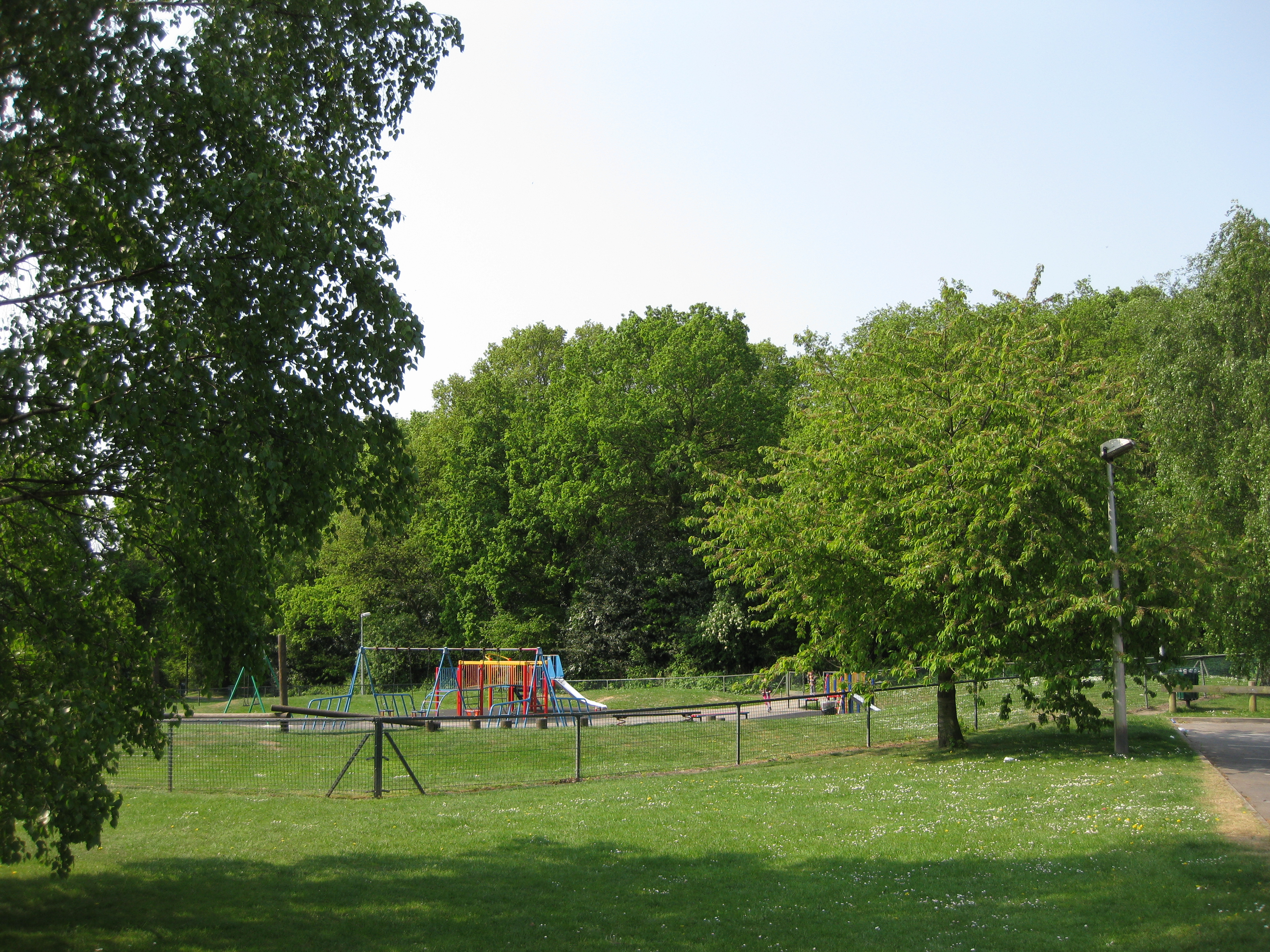
- Palmers Rough and Playground

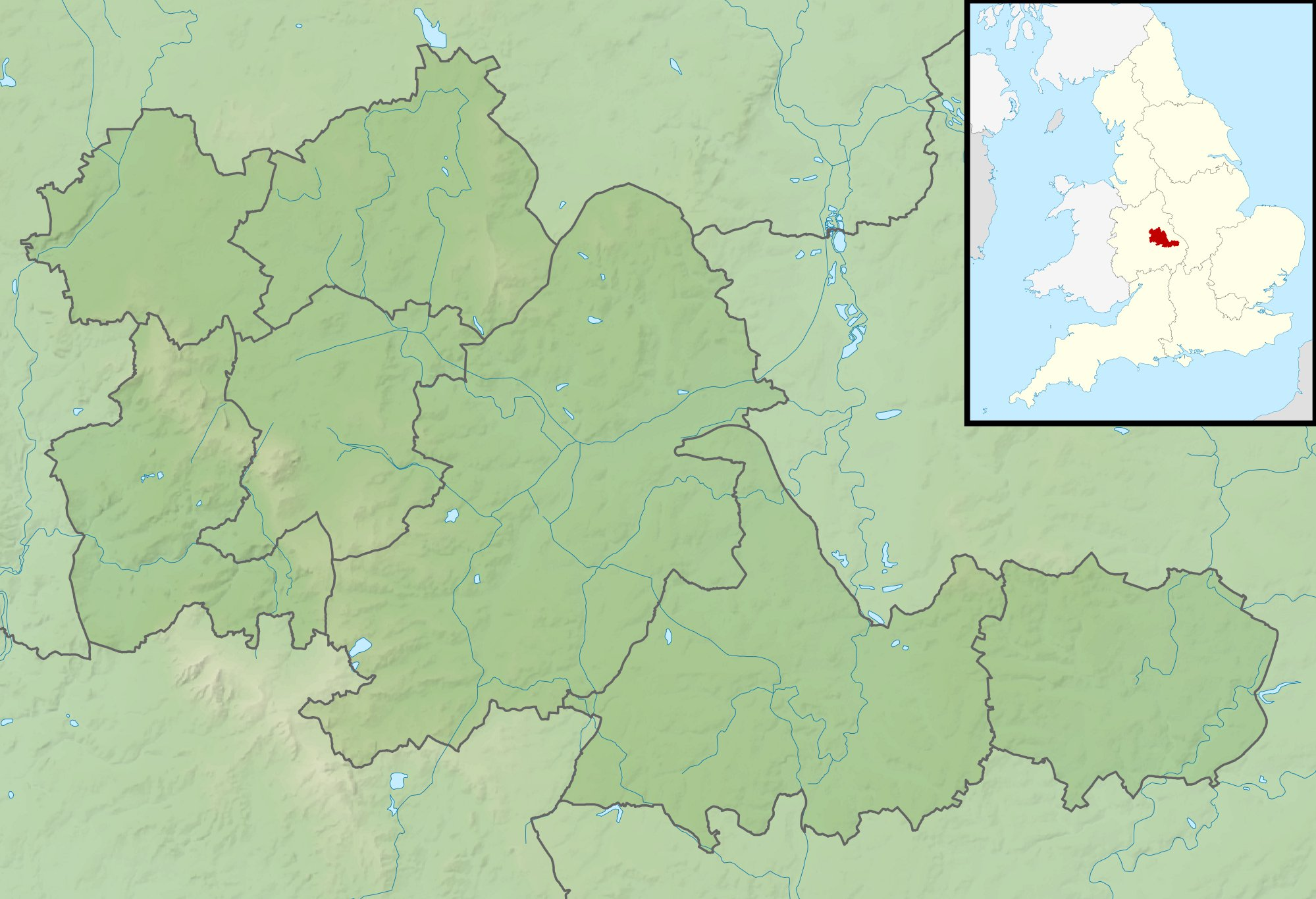
- Location within West Midlands county
- Type: Public park
- Location: Solihull, England
- Coordinates: 52°25′07″N 1°49′17″W
- Area: 7.3 hectares (18 acres)
- Operator: Solihull Council
- Status: Open year round

Palmers Rough is a local nature reserve and park located in Shirley, Solihull. It covers an area of approximately 7.3 hectares (18 acres) and consists of two separate woodland blocks; Palmers Coppice to the east, and Squires Coppice to the west. They are separated by open grassland and include for two football pitches and a small children's playground. A wide range of plants and animals makes Palmers Rough an important urban space and was therefore granted local nature reserve status in 2000. The presence of Palmers Rough is noted within the Domesday Book, and suggests that the woodland dates back over 900 years.

== Nature ==
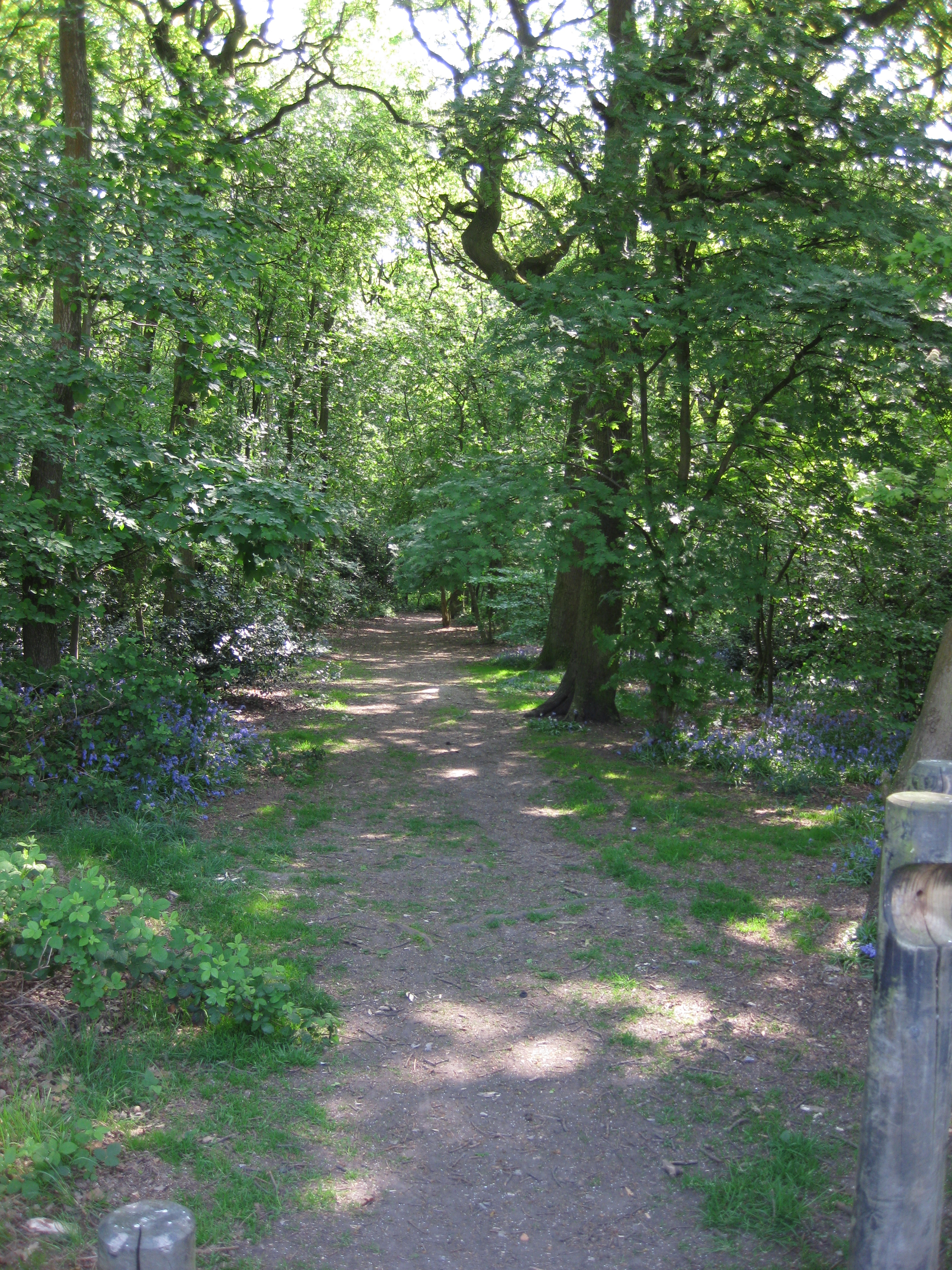
Footpath and bluebells within Palmers Rough

The woods are a mixed broadleaf woodland, composed primarily of oak which forms the main canopy, but includes for many other species such as rowan, maple, ash, and holly. There is also a varied shrub layer of elder, hazel, hawthorn, silver birch, and some cherry laurel. Other smaller shrubs and plants include for bramble, bracken, honeysuckle, broad buckler fern, nettle, ivy, and occasionally Raspberry. Unfortunately Japanese Knotweed has been allowed to take hold in some parts of the site, and in other areas the brambles and nettles are becoming overly dominant.

Many woodland wildflower species are also present, including for bluebells, wood avens, Herb Robert, and more rarely wood sorrel, enchanter's nightshade, cow wheat and bilberry. The latter is normally a heathland species, but here it thrives due to the acidic soils present at the site.

The woods are an important refuge for wildlife in the otherwise sub-urban housing environment of Shirley, and are home to many native species including for green and greater spotted woodpeckers, squirrels, voles, bats, owls and foxes. The two pockets of woodland are joined by a strip of mature oak trees and smaller woody bushes, which provides an important corridor for wildlife between the two. A pond lies within the eastern pocket of woodland and provides a refuge for wildfowl such as ducks and coots, and is also home to rare Sphagnum moss and marsh cinquefoil.

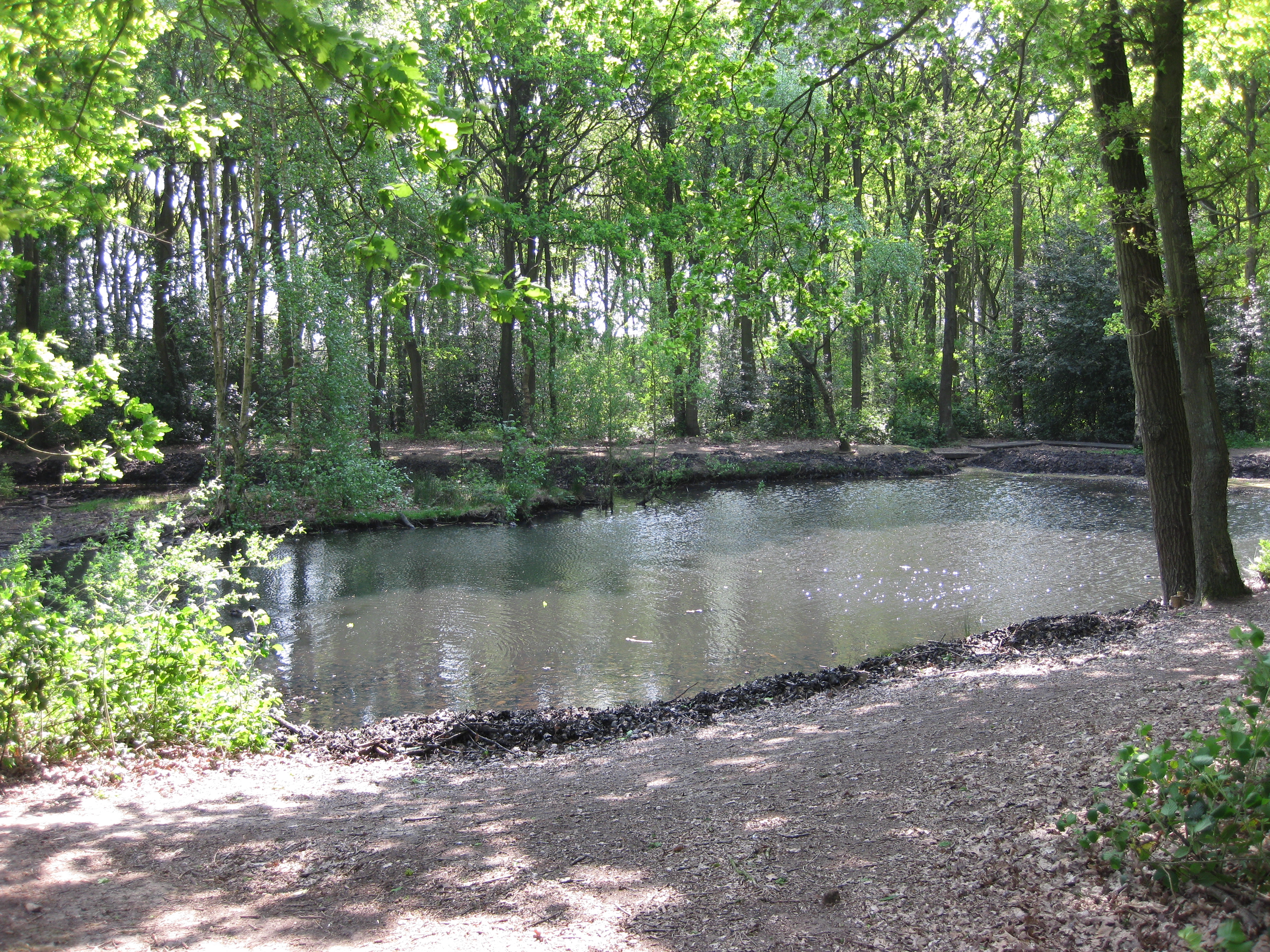
The pond within Palmers Rough

An independent ecological survey was undertaken in 2004, which recommended several long term management tasks including for thinning, coppicing, introducing glades, improving dead wood resources, and managing weeds, brambles and non-native species. The survey was one of many undertaken borough wide as part of the Solihull Woodland Management Programme, which aims to provide a commitment to conserving and improving the various woodlands and parks within the borough. Active woodland management includes for Hazel coppicing, and the use of shire horses, as an alternative to damaging wheeled or tracked vehicles, for removing felled timber.

== Amenities ==
There are two football pitches located to the southern end of the site, which are used by local teams, being available for rent from Solihull Council. To the north of the site there is a small children's playground comprising baby and junior swings, multi-activity climbing frames, and an adventure trail with balance beams, rope and log walks. The playground is immediately adjacent to the Northbrook Group Practice surgery, located on the northern boundary of the site.

== See also ==
- List of local nature reserves in England
