= Elger =

Elger may refer to:

- Herbert Elger, German luger in the late 1920s
- Thomas Gwyn Elger (1836–1897), British astronomer and selenographer
- William Elger (1891–1946), General Secretary of the Scottish Trades Union Congress (from 1922)
- Elger (crater), a lunar crater named after the above

== See also ==
- Elgar (disambiguation)
