= Elmdon Park =

Park and local nature reserve in Elmdon, Solihull, West Midlands, England

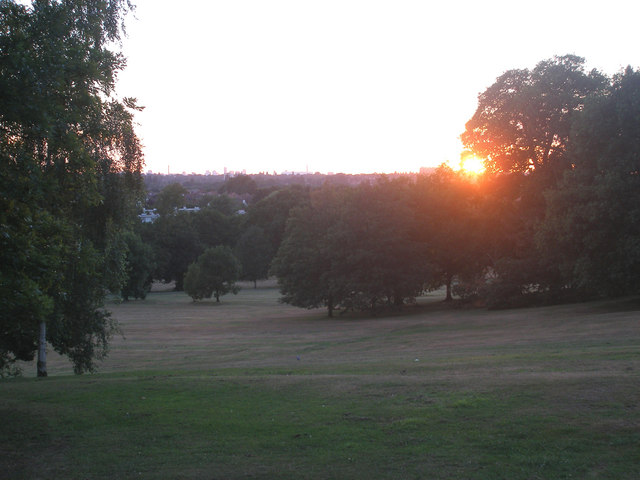
- Elmdon Park shown within the West Midlands

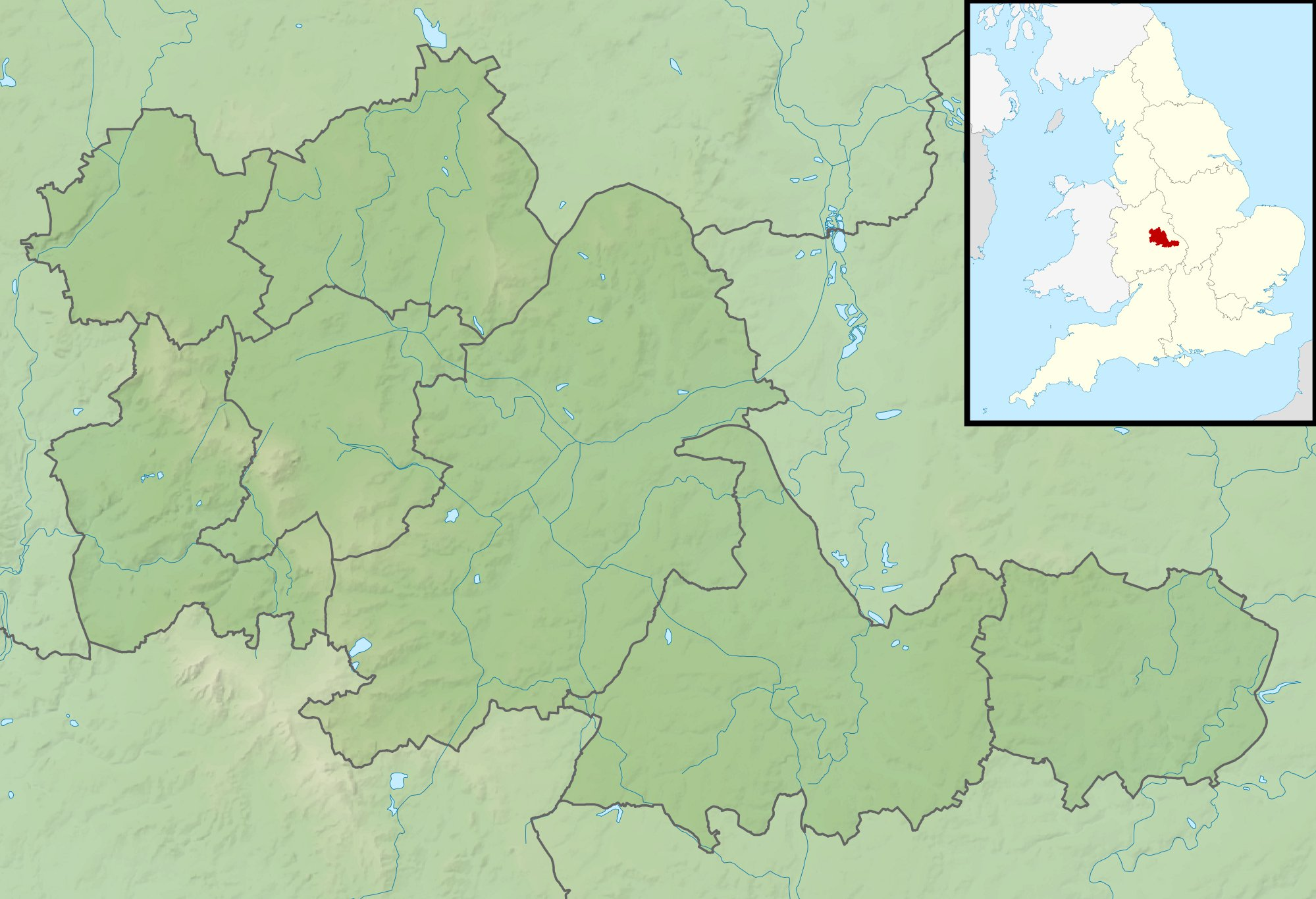
- Location within West Midlands county
- Type: Public park
- Location: Solihull, U.K.
- Coordinates: 52°26′36″N 1°45′44″W
- Area: 11 acres (4.5 ha)
- Operator: Solihull Council
- Status: Open year round

Elmdon Park is a park and local nature reserve in Elmdon, Solihull, West Midlands. It was established in 1944 when the house and grounds of the derelict Elmdon Hall were bought up by the then Solihull Urban District Council. The house was used by the Home Guard during the Second World War years, but the building subsequently became derelict, suffering from a rotten staircase and roof, and was demolished in 1956.

== Description ==
The park is described as being unique amongst Solihull's parks, in that it is located on and around a hill of approximately 120m AOD, thus providing fine views across the surrounding landscape. There is a perimeter walk, which encompasses the lakes, landscape and stream that meanders through the Park. There is also a heritage trail, created by The Friends of Elmdon, which provides historic details and facts relating to the remains of Elmdon Hall, St Nicolas's Church, the old walled garden, and associated buildings. The walled garden is now a local nature reserve managed by the Warwickshire Wildlife Trust.

Aside from the old walled garden, there is also a meadow, woodland and ponds. The woodland and park areas benefit from a wide variety of native trees and provide homes for many bird species such as nuthatch, parakeets, goldcrests and Warblers and some unusual naturalised garden species.

Other facilities within the park include football pitches, tennis courts, and a children's play area.

== See also ==
- List of local nature reserves in England
