= Wulfgar =

Wulfgar, Wolfgar and Wolfger are variants of a Germanic masculine given name meaning "wolf-spear". They may refer to:

== Historical ==
- Wolfgar (bishop of Würzburg), a 9th-century bishop
- Wolfger von Erla, a 12th-century bishop
- Wulfgar of Abingdon, a 10th-century abbot
- Wulfgar of Lichfield, a mid 10th century bishop
- Wolfger of Prüfening, a 12th-century monk and historian
- Wulfgar of Ramsbury, a medieval bishop

== Fictional ==
- Wulfgar (Forgotten Realms), one of the Companions of the Hall from the Icewind Dale Trilogy
- Wulfgar, the herald of Hroðgar, a character in Beowulf
- Wulfgar, the villain in the 1981 Sylvester Stallone film Nighthawks
- Wulfgar, one of the Greybeards in The Elder Scrolls V: Skyrim
