= Tudor Grange Park =

Park in Solihull, England

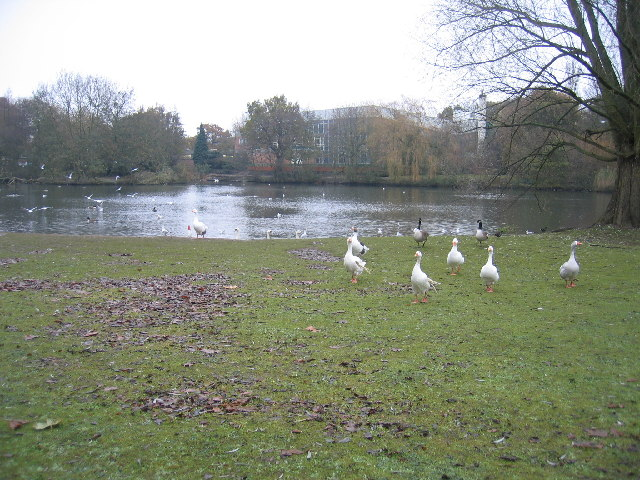
- Tudor Grange Park

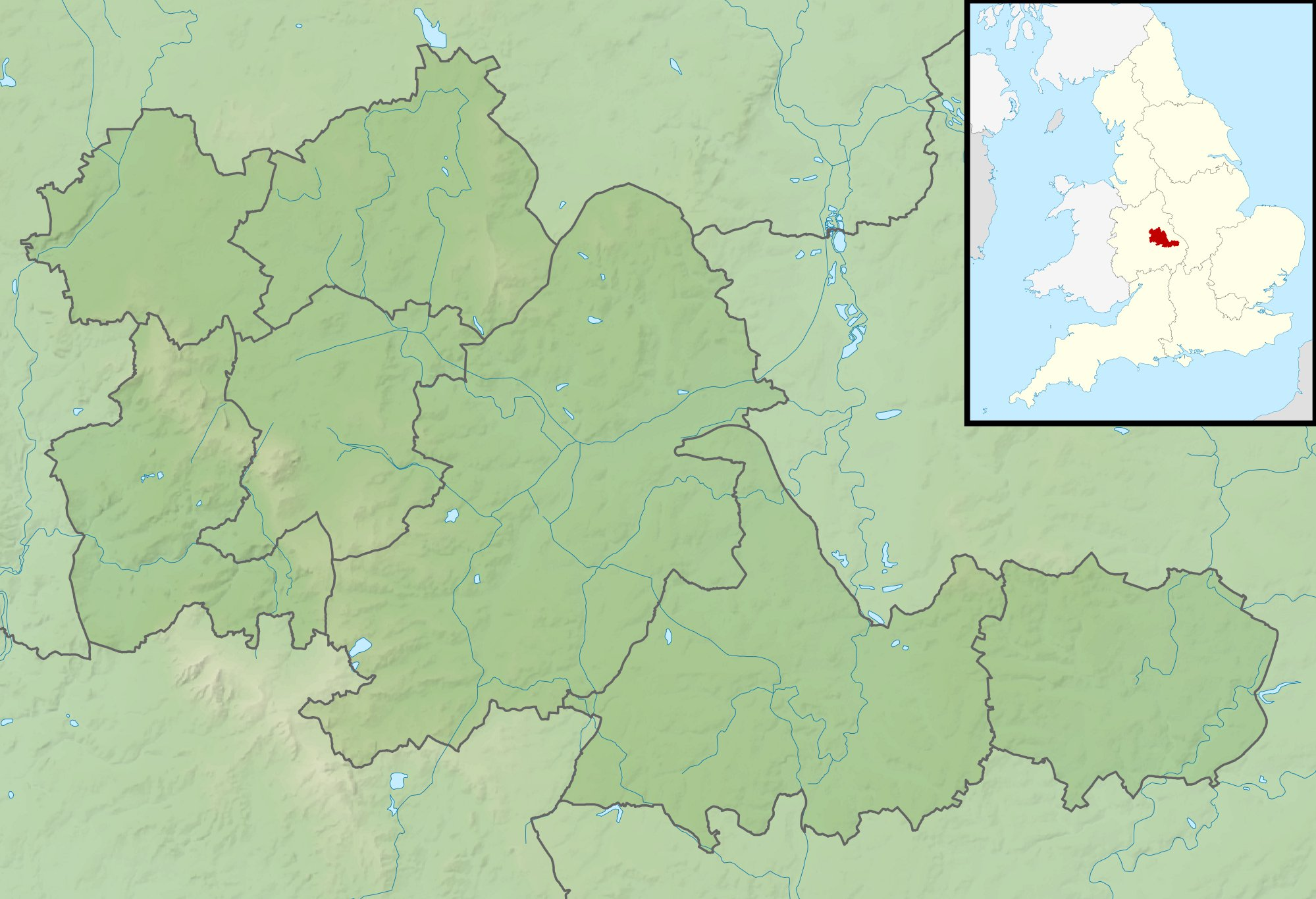
- Location within West Midlands county
- Type: Public park
- Location: Solihull, England
- Coordinates: 52°24′37″N 1°47′12″W
- Operator: Solihull Council
- Status: Open year round

Tudor Grange Park is a park located in Solihull, West Midlands, England. The Park is located very close to the town centre, within easy walking distance, and is adjacent to the local train station and Leisure Centre, Tudor Grange Leisure Centre. It is described by the council as an informal recreation area with a stream dissecting the park, and holds some major events such as the Solihull Carnival.

The Park was bought by the Council in 1946, formerly being farmland belonging to the Bird Family, of Bird's Custard fame, who lived at Tudor Grange, which is now part of the adjacent Solihull College.

As well as providing for a children's play area, a skate park was built in 2003. There is also a cycle track and pitch and putt course at the south west end of the site.

== Nature ==
The site benefits from a stream, the Alder Brook, which fills a small lake providing a valuable haven for many wildfowl, including for geese, mute swans, ducks, moorhens and coots.

== 2008 Park Improvements ==
A number of improvements were undertaken by Solihull Council in 2008, as part of a £1,000,000 redevelopment of the park.

The cycle track was built with the help of a £400,000 grant from Sport England's community club development. The track was championed by a former Olympic silver medallist Harry Reynolds, who is also a member of Solihull Cycling Club. The track is formed as a 1 km figure of eight circuit, and was designed in conjunction with the British Cycling and Solihull Cycling Clubs to ensure the materials and layout provided a challenging circuit for professional training and racing, yet still providing a recreational cycling facility for the local and wider community.

Other improvements included for a refurbishment of the children's play area; new hard landscaping, footpaths and better lighting; CCTV cameras; outdoor gym equipment including a rowing machine, support bars and wall bars; improvements to the stream and lake including new bridges; and new planting and landscaping including for semi-mature native oak, birch, alder, black poplar, and other native woodland trees and ornamental shrubs.

== Maps ==
- pdf map of the park
