= Elgar Technology College =

Location
- Bilford Road; Worcester, Worcestershire, WR3 8HN; England; 52.21307°N 2.21176°W

Information
- Type: State secondary school
- Motto: What have you done today to make you feel proud?
- Established: 1983
- Closed: 2009
- Specialist: Technology
- Gender: Mixed
- Age: 11 to 16

Elgar Technology College was a secondary school in Worcester, Worcestershire, England, that was formed in 1983 and closed in 2009. It was a co-educational community school with an enrollment of about 860 students aged from 11 to 16. Elgar held Specialist Technology College status.

The school was formed following a merger of Perdiswell School and Samuel Southall Merriman's School. Many students were from socially disadvantaged backgrounds. There were low proportions of students from minority heritage backgrounds and a small number of students for whom English is an additional language. The attainment of students on entry spanned the full ability range but on average was lower than the national figure. There were slightly higher proportions of students with learning difficulties or disabilities. In 2007, less than 42% of pupils achieved five or more A*-C grades for GCSEs. In 2007 following an Ofsted report the school was placed into special measures; Eleven out of twenty inspection criteria areas were graded as being exceptionally low.

After failing to improve according to the Ofsted requirements, Elgar Technology College was closed in 2009. The site was taken over and a new school, Tudor Grange Academy, a sister school to Tudor Grange School in Solihull, occupied the premises and opened on 1 September 2009.
