= Tudor Grange Academy, Solihull =

Tudor Grange Academy
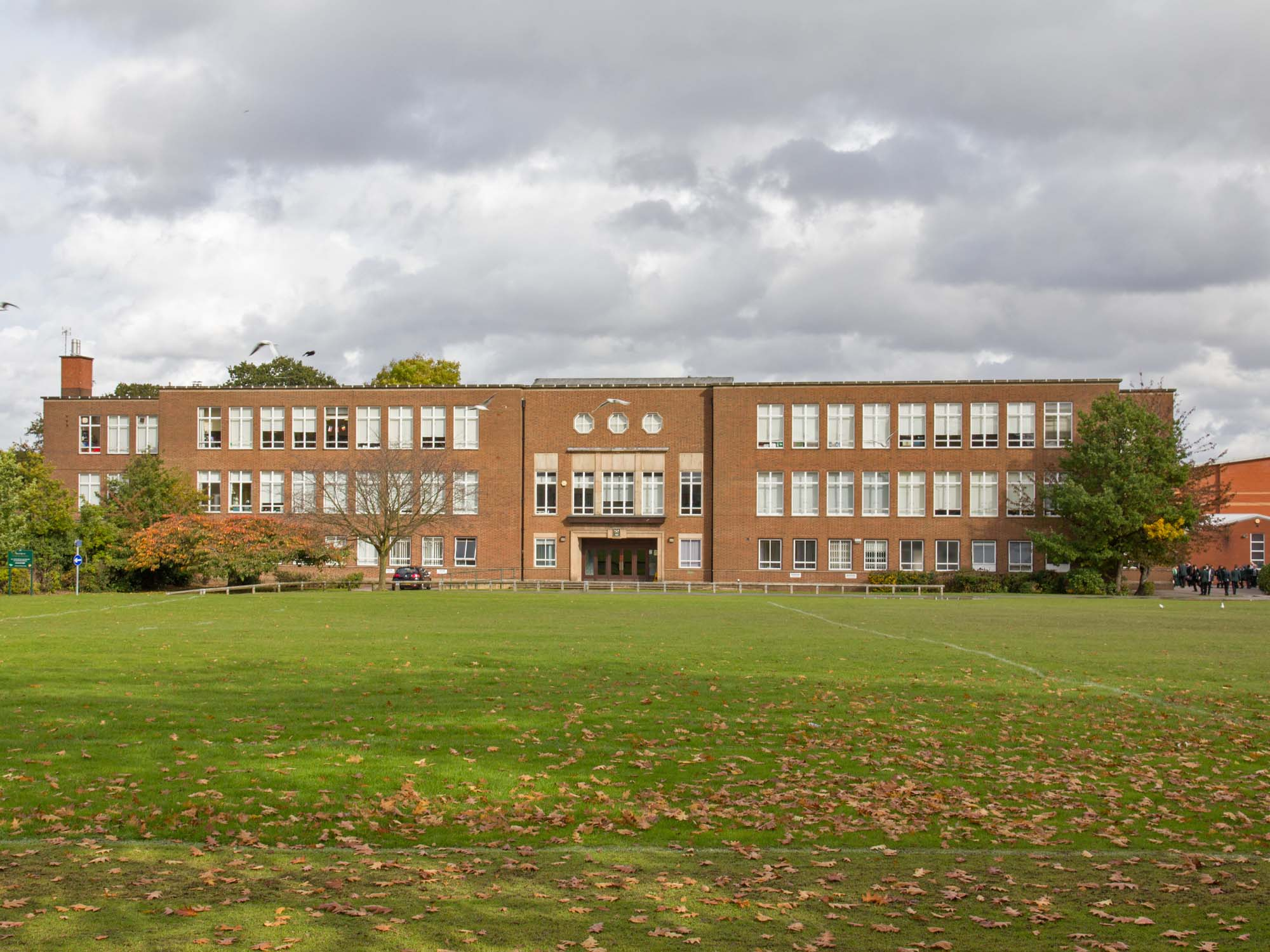

Location
- Dingle Lane; Solihull, West Midlands, B91 3PD; England; 52°24′16″N 1°47′36″W

Information
- Type: Academy
- Motto: Omnibus Prodesse
- Established: 1956
- Specialist: Technology
- Department for Education URN: 136310 Tables
- Ofsted: Reports
- Executive Principal: Claire Mclean
- Head teacher: Claire Smith
- Gender: Coeducational
- Age: 11 to 18
- Enrolment: 1558
- Houses: Austen, Duleep, Hawking, Mirzakhani, Owens, Turing
- Former name: Tudor Grange School
- Former name: Tudor Grange Grammar School
- Website: www.tudor-grange.solihull.sch.uk

Tudor Grange Academy is a co-educational Academy and technology college located in Solihull, West Midlands, England. Formerly known as Tudor Grange Grammar School and Tudor Grange Secondary School. It was originally a boys' grammar school for around 650 boys. A girls grammar school was built later and both original schools now form part of the current academy.

== Location ==
Tudor Grange is situated in Tudor Grange Park, west of Solihull town centre, next to Alderbrook Secondary School (former Harold Malley Grammar School and Harold Cartwright Girls' Grammar School) and St Peter's Catholic School. Solihull College is next-door to the east.

== History ==
=== Foundation ===
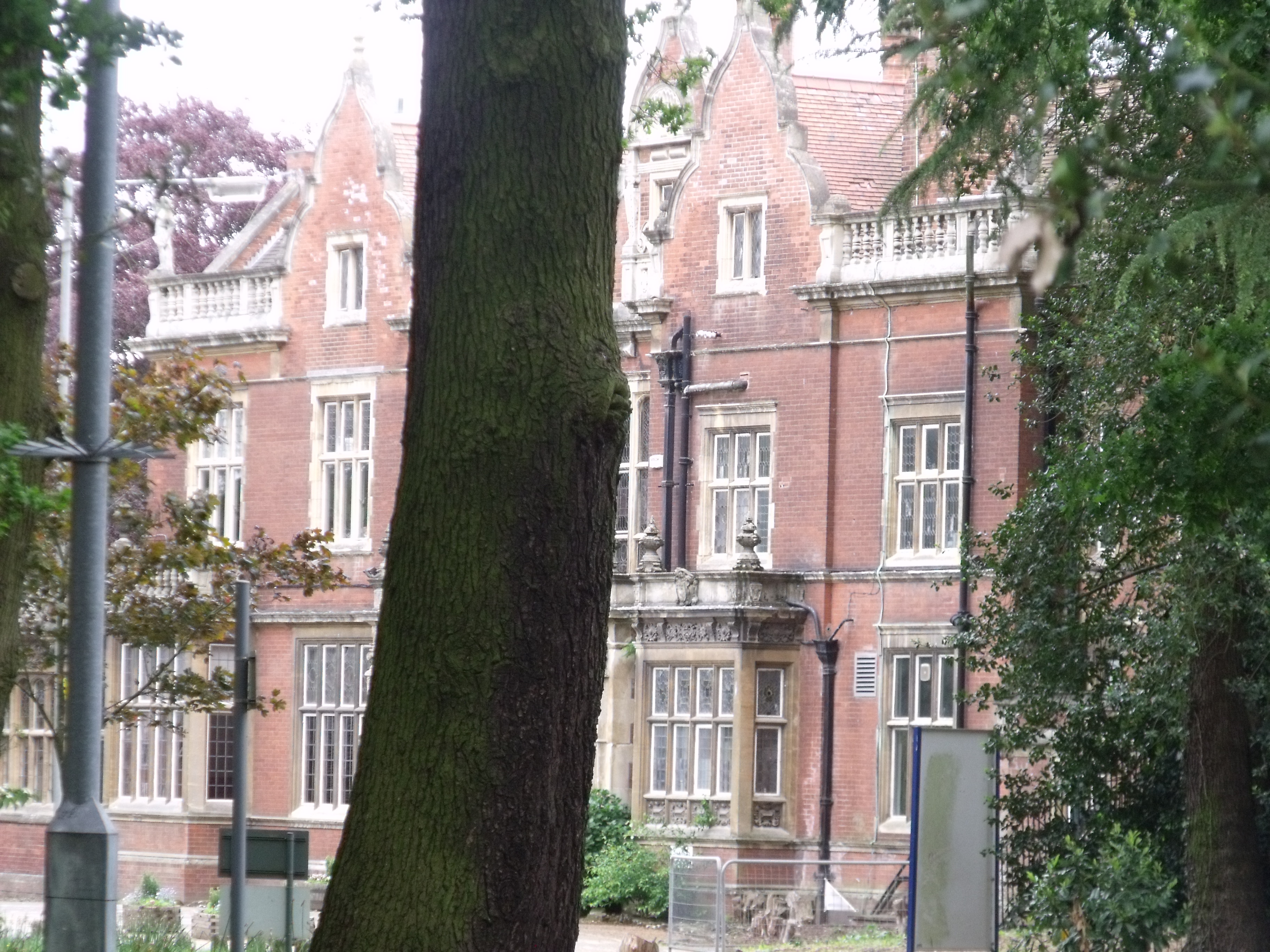
Tudor Grange House

Tudor Grange house, a now grade II* listed property, was completed in Solihull in 1887 for Alfred Lovekin, a silversmith and Lord of the Manor of Longdon in Solihull, who originally leased the land from the Chattock family of Castle Bromwich. The land was known as Garret's Green Farm on Whitefields Road, and Mr Lovekin purchased it for the development of a Jacobethan style "Tudor Grange House" and landscaped park. It seems unclear why the name "Tudor Grange" was chosen for the house, but the land may historically have once formed part of a Monastic grange belonging to the Warwickshire based Friars of Thelsford. Mr Lovekin later sold the estate to Sir Alfred Bird, the owner of Bird's Custard then produced at the Birmingham Custard Factory. The Bird family bequeathed the house and estate to the people of Solihull for the construction of 'Tudor Grange' schools around the turn of the century. The main Tudor Grange House building was turned over to a Tudor Grange School for children with physical ailments such as polio (this school would later move to Olton in the 1970s becoming 'Swanswell School'), while a new building would be constructed in the grounds of the House for the Tudor Grange Grammar School.

After Tudor Grange Grammar school had been established on this site, other parcels of the estate were passed on by the school for neighbouring schools, colleges and parkland.

=== Grammar schools ===
==== Boys School ====
While the new purpose built school building was constructed the Tudor Grange Grammar School began as an entity at Lode Heath School, Lode Lane, in September 1951, with two mixed classes 1G1&1G2. The formative school continued with these temporary arrangements until the new boys' school building on Dingle Lane was opened in September 1956, the official ceremony taking place on Tuesday 23 July 1957. The cost of building the new premises is reported to have been £176,445. Six hundred boys were taught at the school whose motto was 'Omnibus prodesse' - 'to be of service to all mankind'

In addition to the established Lode Heath School contingent, the new intake also included boys from Sharman's Cross Secondary Modern School. Subsequent entries were drawn from boys passing the 11+ exam together with a very small number passing a 13+ exam.

The original uniform of the school comprised a black blazer with school badge on the breast pocket, a white shirt, a school tie in stripes of black gold and silver, a black cap with school badge and black lace-up leather shoes. 1st and 2nd year boys wore grey shorts whilst older boys were allowed to wear grey flannel trousers. 6th formers wore a slightly more flamboyant tie whilst prefects wore a cap with a gold stripe.

The original Headmaster was Mr A. R. Munday, who later left to become Headmaster of the King's School, Chester, in 1964. He was followed as Headmaster by John Scandrett Millward, who in turn was followed in 1973 by Robert Fulton.

Amongst some of the masters at this time was mathematics teacher Mr Arthur Bowden, who had the enthusiasm to have a small astronomical observatory built in the grounds, although he also declared in 1958 that it was "mathematically impossible for any space-craft to leave the gravitational pull of the earth".

==== Girls School ====
After the construction of the boys' school, a Tudor Grange School for Girls was built next door. The two schools had playing fields which shared a common boundary.

==== Merger ====
The schools were merged in 1974 to become Tudor Grange Grammar School.

The original houses for both the boys and girls schools were all named after Tudor noble houses. When the schools merged so too did the houses, becoming Beaufort-Mowbray, Lancaster-Newburgh, York-Verney and Howard-Richmond.

=== Comprehensive ===
In 1974, for the new intake it became 'Tudor Grange Secondary School', and was a mixed 11-16 comprehensive school with a pupil roll of around 1250. (The existing pupils remained at their respective Grammar schools.) The comprehensive school included both buildings from the girls' and boys' school (now known as Willow and Oak buildings), it was a technological college with high academic achievement.

Since then a new block dedicated to teaching the International Baccalaureate Diploma has been added together with a new sports hall allowing one of the two old gyms has been turned into a large classroom known as the 'Lead Lesson Suite' used as an exam room and for teaching large groups of pupils. In November 2009 the school was awarded Bronze award in the Eco-Schools programme which is run nationwide. The school also has a partnership school called Tudor Grange Academy Worcester, replacing Elgar Technology College.

The school became fully comprehensive in 1974, the year the County Borough of Solihull became the larger Metropolitan Borough of Solihull. In 1984, Solihull LEA looked at the possibility of returning to a selective system of schools (made possible because the 1976 Education Act was repealed in 1979), and making the school a grammar school. In September 1995, Tudor Grange became a Technology College and in September 2009 the school adopted a specialism in business and enterprise. In 2007 the school houses were changed to reflect the schools status as a technology college, to the names of British scientists and engineers. In September 2010, it converted to become an Academy.

The school was classed as outstanding by OFSTED in 2006, and shares a partnership with the Tudor Grange Academy in Worcester.

== Notable alumni ==
- Richard Allinson, Radio 2 DJ
- Martin Baggott and Donald Gould, both members of The Applejacks
- Jeremy Bates, former British No.1 tennis player
- Dominic Coleman, television and film actor
- Rev Dr Peter R. Forster, the Bishop of Chester from 1996 to 2019
- Dinah Jefferies, novelist
- Simon Fowler, lead vocalist and acoustic guitarist in Ocean Colour Scene
- David Jamieson, Labour MP from 1992-2005 for Plymouth Devonport and President since 2005 of the Motor Cycle Industry Association
- Justin King, former CEO of J Sainsbury plc
