= Algar (thane) =

Algar was an Anglo-Saxon personal name, frequently mentioned in the Domesday Book of 1068. it is impossible to determine whether the many mentions of the name in that record refer to a single person or to several people of the same name. Some mentions of the name have an identifying suffix, such as "Algar Long" and "Algar the Priest".

Certainly one of the men of this name was one of only twenty English thanes in Devonshire who, following the Norman Conquest in 1066 retained their lands and titles as thanes under the new Norman King from whom, according to the Domesday Book he held two manors as tenant-in-chief called Chenudestane and Chenuestan (with the probable meaning 'Canute Stone'), at today's Knowstone, South Molton in North Devon.

One of the wealthiest and most powerful English thanes living at the time of the Norman Conquest was Brictric, son of Algar.
