= Shirley Baptist Church, Solihull UK =

Baptist church in Solihull, England

Coordinates: 52.4141°N 1.8287°W

Shirley Baptist Church is a Baptist church in Solihull near Birmingham, England. The church building is situated on Stratford Road (A34) with halls facing into Trinity Place in the Parkgate pedestrianised area. The church was founded in 1797 and is a member of the Baptist Union of Great Britain and the Evangelical Alliance.

== History ==
The first recorded Baptist worship in Shirley took place in 1797, when a group from Cannon Street Baptist Church in Birmingham, under their Minister, Rev. Samuel Pearce, held meetings in a former pub on the corner of what is now Stratford Road and Olton Road. In 1845 the congregation moved to their own Chapel in the Sandy Hill Farm area.

The current church building was constructed in 1910, funded by Mr. and Mrs. Robert Braithwaite, in memory of Mrs Braithwaite's parents Mr. and Mrs. Guy. For that reason the church is officially known as the Guy Memorial Chapel.

Halls to the rear of the church were added in 1913 and extended in the 1930s including a caretakers house. These halls and caretakers house were demolished in 2012. In 2013 a new set of church buildings was opened by the Deputy Mayor of Solihull, councillor Ken Hawkins.
