= Solihull Sixth Form College =

West Midlands sixth-form college

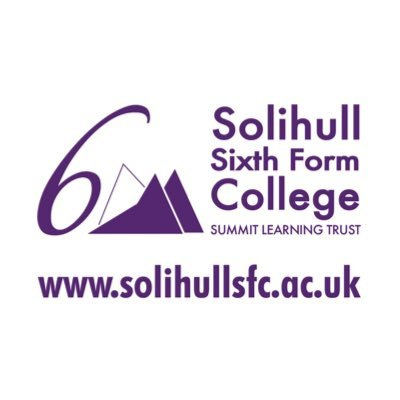

Location
- Widney Manor Road; Solihull, West Midlands, B91 3WR; England
- 52°24′22″N 1°46′23″W

Information
- Department for Education URN: 144887 Tables
- Ofsted: Reports
- Chair: Jonathan Bridges
- Principal: Martin Sullivan
- Gender: Co-educational
- Age: 16 to 19
- Colour: Purple
- Website: www.solihullsfc.ac.uk

Solihull Sixth Form College is a further education college for students aged 16 to 19. It is situated on the outskirts of Solihull in the West Midlands and draws students from across Solihull and Birmingham. Founded in 1974, the college consists of several large buildings on a single site.

The college offers different subjects at A-Level, as well as a small number of vocational courses. The college received an Ofsted inspection in March 2024 with the rating "Good".

== Alumni ==
- Hannah Hampton, footballer
- Sophie Baggaley, association football goalkeeper
- Elizabeth Bower, actress
- Anna Brewster, model and actress from The Tudors
- Shefali Chowdhury, actress
- Lucy Davis, actress
- Julian Eastoe, chemist
- Simon Fowler, lead singer of rock group Ocean Colour Scene
- Richard Harrison, Head of Space Physics and Chief Scientist at Rutherford Appleton Laboratory
- Justin King, former CEO of Sainsbury's
- Gary Knight, war photographer

== See also ==
- Sixth form
