= Ælfgar of Selwood =

English anglo-saxon saint

Ælfgar (Algar), according to 16th-century antiquarian John Leland, was a saint venerated at a chapel in the forest of Selwood, three miles from Mells (near Frome), Somerset. Leland wrote that at the chapel "be buryed the bones of S. Algar, of late tymes superstitiously soute of by the folische commune people". There is no other surviving information on the saint, and it is presumed he was an Anglo-Saxon hermit.
