= Solihull College =

Further education college in Solihull, England

Solihull College & University Centre - Blossomfield Campus
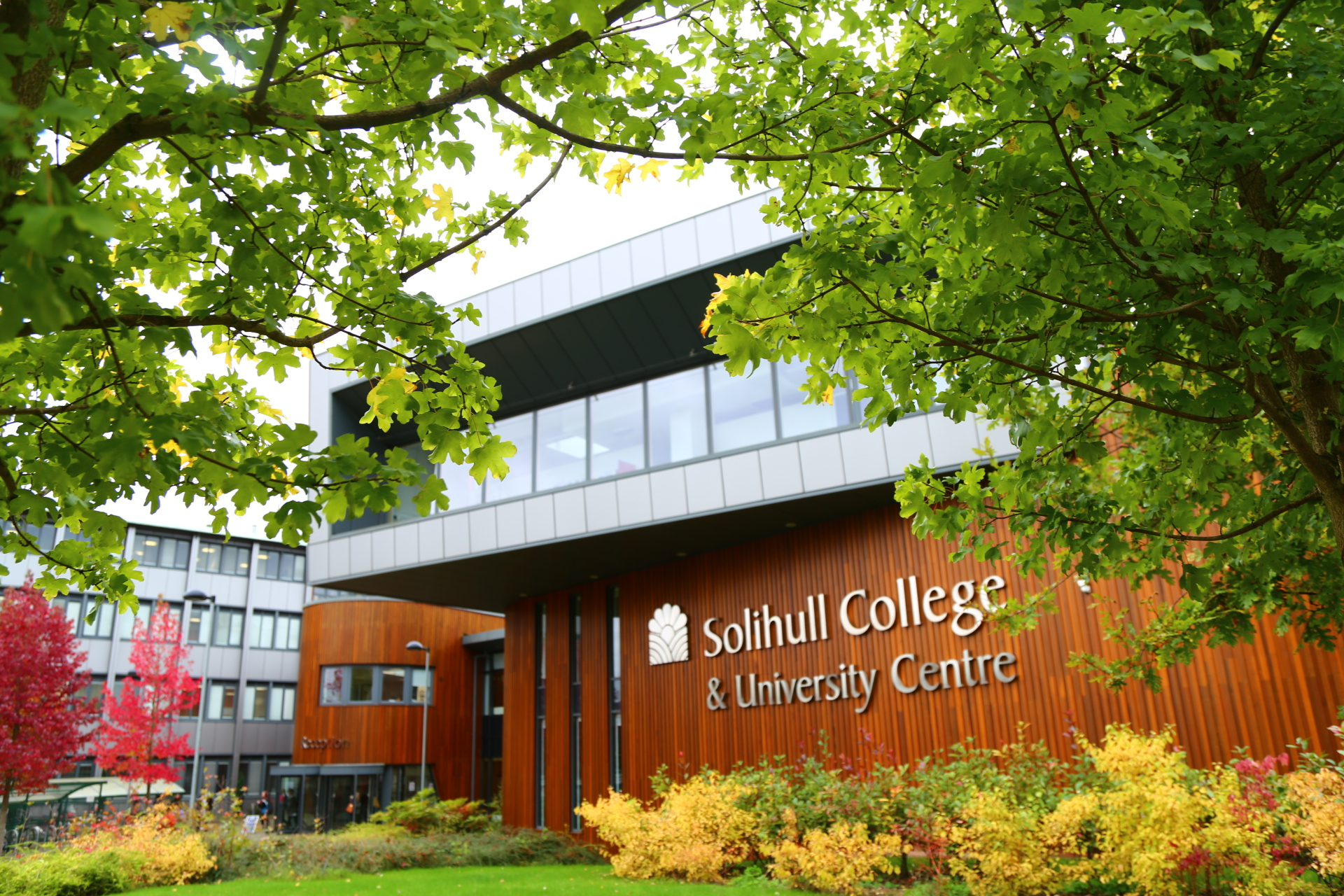
- Blossomfield Campus

Location
- Blossomfield Road; Solihull, West Midlands B91 1SB; England
- Coordinates: 52°24′34″N 1°47′32″W

Information
- Established: 1954
- Department for Education URN: 130481 Tables
- Ofsted: Reports
- Principal: Rebecca Gater
- Gender: Coeducational
- Age: 16+
- Website: www.solihull.ac.uk

Solihull College & University Centre - Woodlands Campus
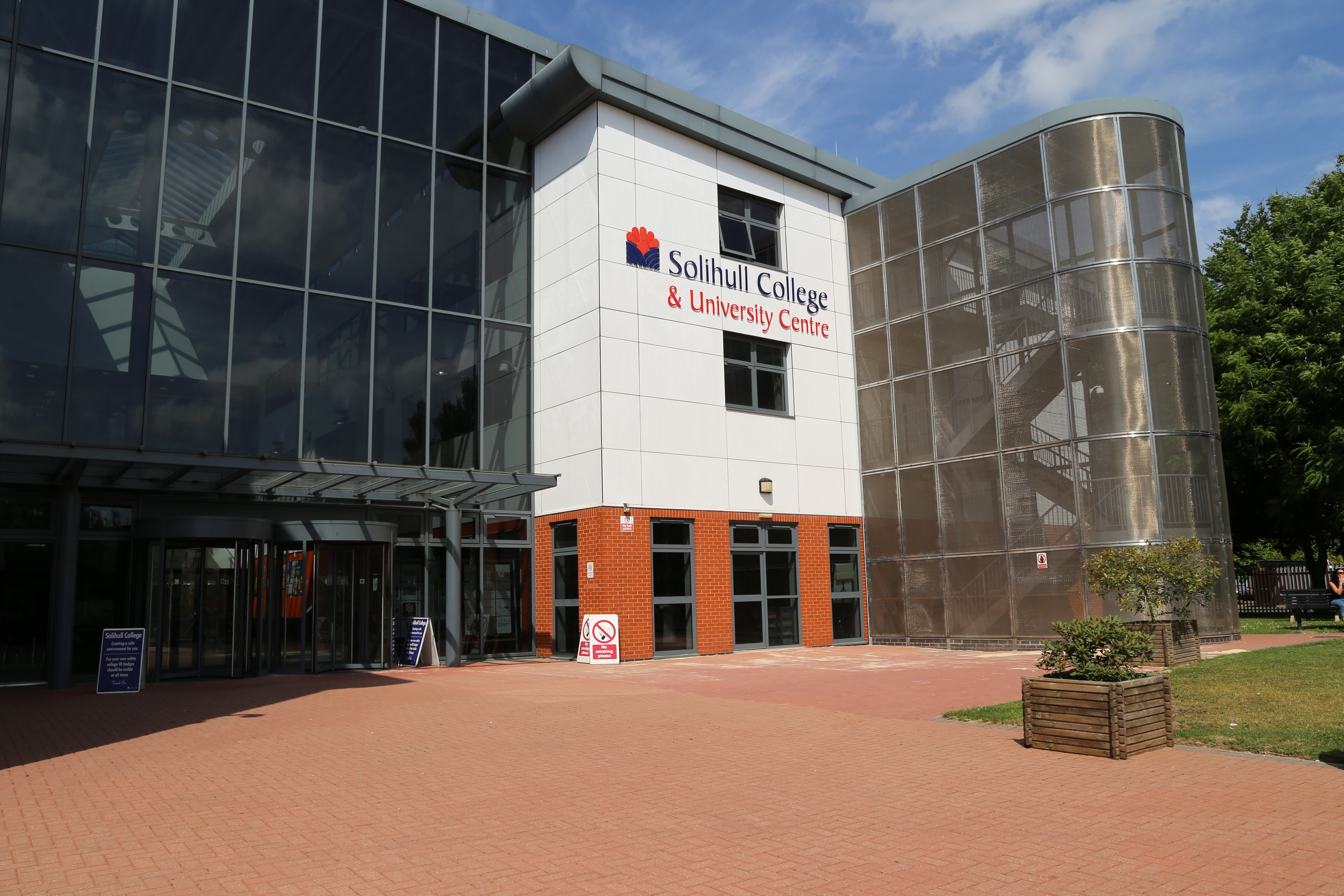
- Woodlands Campus

Location
- Auckland Drive; Smith's Wood, Solihull, West Midlands B36; England
- Coordinates: 52°29′46″N 1°44′21″W

Information
- Department for Education URN: 130481 Tables
- Ofsted: Reports
- Principal: Rebecca Gater
- Gender: Coeducational
- Age: 16+
- Website: www.solihull.ac.uk

Solihull College & University Centre is a further education college located in the Metropolitan Borough of Solihull, in the West Midlands, England. The College has two main campuses: the Blossomfield Campus near central Solihull, and the Woodlands Campus based in Smith's Wood, north Solihull. The Principal of the College is Rebecca Gater.

Solihull College offers full-time, part-time, higher education courses, apprenticeships and bespoke employment training. Facilities include an animal welfare centre, virtual reality lab, industry-standard science labs and health & care skills suite at Blossomfield Campus and aircraft hangar and flight simulators, plus motor vehicle and construction workshops at Woodlands Campus.

In February 2018 the College merged with Stratford-upon-Avon College, increasing the size and influence of the combined college in the region. As of 2022 there have been no announcements that university college status will be forthcoming.

== Courses ==
Solihull College offers a variety of courses, ranging from vocational courses to foundation-level programmes and apprenticeships. The College also offers a variety of university-level qualifications including HNCs and HNDs, foundation degrees, top-up degrees, master's degrees and full BA degrees. A number of the higher education qualifications are accredited by the likes of Birmingham Newman University, Coventry University, the University of Northampton and Oxford Brookes University. Part-time courses, distance learning programmes and community courses are also offered by the college.

Solihull College is an affiliate member of the Land Based Colleges Aspiring to Excellence (Landex).

== Alumni ==
Former Solihull College & University Centre students include Northern Ireland footballer Will Grigg, England footballer Gary Cahill, celebrity chef Glynn Purnell and film director Malcolm Venville.

== See also ==
- Education in England
- Further Education
- Solihull
- The Sixth Form College, Solihull
