= List of cemeteries in England =

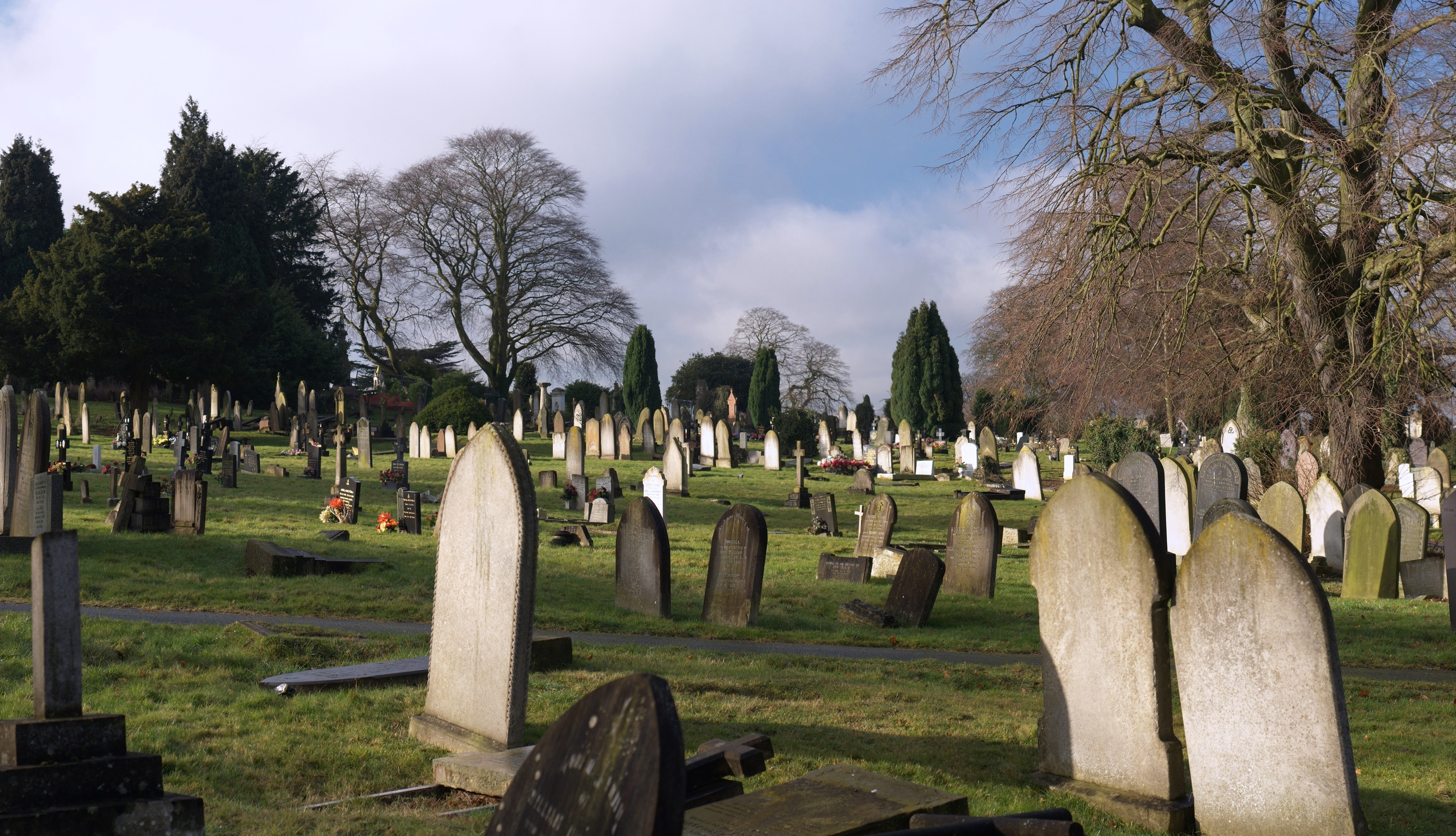
Gravestones in Welford Road Cemetery, Leicester

This is a list of cemeteries in England still in existence. Only cemeteries which are notable and can be visited are included. Churchyards and graveyards that belong to churches and are still in existence are not included. Ancient burial grounds are excluded.

Cemeteries in London and Brighton and Hove have separate lists.

== List of existing cemeteries ==
Name of the cemetery	Date opened	Community	County	Postal area	Closed	Notes	Website
Agecroft Cemetery	1903	Salford	Greater Manchester	M27	No		Yes
Aldershot Cemetery	1860	Aldershot	Hampshire	GU11	TBC		-
Aldershot Military Cemetery	1856	Aldershot Military Town	Hampshire	GU11	TBC	Military cemetery	-
Allerton Cemetery	1909	Liverpool	Merseyside	L19	TBC		-
Anfield Cemetery	1863	Liverpool	Merseyside	L4	TBC		-
Arnos Vale Cemetery	1839	Bristol	Bristol	BS4	No		Yes
Bath Abbey Cemetery	1844	Bath	Somerset	BA2	1995		Yes
Biggleswade Cemetery	1869	Biggleswade	Bedfordshire	SG18	TBC		-
Bishopwearmouth Cemetery	1856	Sunderland	Tyne and Wear	SR4	TBC		-
Blackley Cemetery	1953	Manchester	Greater Manchester	M9	TBC		-
Boston Cemetery	1855	Boston	Lincolnshire	PE21	TBC		-
Bouncer's Lane Cemetery, Cheltenham	1864	Prestbury	Gloucestershire	GL52	TBC		-
Brandwood End Cemetery	1899	Birmingham	West Midlands	B14	TBC		-
Brookwood Cemetery	1852	Brookwood	Surrey	GU24	TBC		-
Cambridge City Cemetery	1903	Cambridge	Cambridgeshire	CB5	TBC		-
Cambridge American Cemetery and Memorial	1956	Cambridge	Cambridgeshire	CB23	TBC	Military cemetery	-
Cannock Chase German Military Cemetery	1967	Cannock Chase	Staffordshire	WS12	TBC	Military cemetery	-
Carleton Crematorium and Cemetery	1935	Blackpool	Lancashire	FY6	TBC		-
City Road Cemetery	1881	Sheffield	South Yorkshire	S2	TBC		-
Compton Cemetery - Watts Cemetery	1896	Guildford	Surrey	GU3	TBC		-
Crookes Cemetery	1906	Sheffield	South Yorkshire	S10	No		-
Darwen Cemetery	1861	Darwen	Lancashire	BB3	No		Yes
Everton Cemetery	1880	Liverpool	Merseyside	L9	TBC		-
Flaybrick Hill Cemetery	1864	Birkenhead	Merseyside	CH43	TBC		-
Ford Park Cemetery	1848	Plymouth	Devon	PL4	No		Yes
Gildencroft Quaker Cemetery, Norwich	1670	Norwich	Norfolk	NR3	TBC		-
Glastonbury Cemetery	1855	Glastonbury	Somerset	BA6	No		-
Greenhaven Woodland Burial Ground	1994	Lilbourne	Warwickshire	CV23	TBC	First Natural Burial Ground	-
Hamilton Road Cemetery	1856	Deal	Kent	CT14	TBC		-
Harlow Hill Cemetery	1871	Harrogate	North Yorkshire	HG2	TBC	Public	Yes
Harrogate (Stonefall) Commonwealth War Graves Commission Cemetery	1943	Harrogate	North Yorkshire	HG3	TBC	Military cemetery	Yes
Histon Road Cemetery, Cambridge	1843	Cambridge	Cambridgeshire	CB4	TBC		Yes
Hitchin Cemetery	1857	Hitchin	Hertfordshire	SG4	TBC		-
Hollybrook Cemetery	1913	Southampton	Hampshire	SO16	No	Yes	-
Holywell Cemetery	1847	Oxford	Oxfordshire	OX1	No		Yes
Hull General Cemetery	1847	Hull	Yorkshire	HU5	Closed to burials	Hull's classic Victorian Cemetery	Yes
Jesmond Old Cemetery	1836	Newcastle-upon-Tyne	Tyne and Wear	NE2	No		Yes
Landican Cemetery	?	Landican	Merseyside	CH49	No		Yes
Letchworth Cemetery	?	Letchworth Garden City	Hertfordshire	SG6	TBC	Closed to new burials	-
Locksbrook Cemetery	1864	Bath	Somerset	BA1	TBC		-
Kent and Sussex Crematorium and Cemetery	1873	Royal Tunbridge Wells	Kent	TN2	TBC		-
Key Hill Cemetery	1836	Birmingham	West Midlands	B18	TBC	Closed to new burials	-
Layton Cemetery	1935	Blackpool	Lancashire	FY3	TBC		-
Linthorpe Cemetery	1869	Middlesbrough	North Yorkshire	TS5	TBC		-
Lodge Hill Cemetery	1895	Birmingham	West Midlands	B29	TBC		-
London Road Cemetery	1847	Coventry	West Midlands	CV1	TBC		Yes
Lowestoft Cemetery	1885	Lowestoft	Suffolk	NR32	TBC		-
Lye and Wollescote Cemetery	1879	Lye	West Midlands	DY9	TBC		-
Macclesfield Cemetery	1866	Macclesfield	Cheshire	SK10	TBC		-
Margate Cemetery	1856	Margate	Kent	CT9	TBC		-
Middleton Cemetery	1912	Rochdale	Greater Manchester	M24	TBC		-
Mill Road Cemetery, Cambridge	1848	Cambridge	Cambridgeshire	CB1	1949		Yes
Mount Cemetery	?	Guildford	Surrey	GU1	TBC		-
Nottingham Road Cemetery	1855	Derby	Derbyshire	DE21	No		-
Norton Cemetery (Sheffield)	1869	Sheffield	South Yorkshire	S8	No		-
Osney Cemetery	1848	Oxford	Oxfordshire	OX2	TBC		-
Overleigh Cemetery	1850	Chester	Cheshire	CH4	TBC		-
Reading Old Cemetery	1843	Reading	Berkshire	RG1	TBC		-
Robin Hood Cemetery	1917	Solihull	West Midlands	B90	TBC		-
Rock Municipal Cemetery	1845	Nottingham	Nottinghamshire	NG1	TBC		-
Rosary Cemetery, Norwich	1819	Norwich	Norfolk	NR1	No		Yes
Sheffield General Cemetery	1836	Sheffield	South Yorkshire	S11	1978		Yes
Intake Cemetery	1880	Sheffield	South Yorkshire	S12	No		-
Abbey Lane Cemetery	?	Sheffield	South Yorkshire	S8	No		-
Beckett Street Cemetery	1845	Leeds	West Yorkshire	LS9	2001		Yes
Beighton Cemetery	?	Sheffield	South Yorkshire	S20	No		-
Burncross Cemetery	?	Sheffield	South Yorkshire	S35	No		-
Burngreave Cemetery	?	Sheffield	South Yorkshire	S3	No		Yes
Darnall Cemetery	1859	Sheffield	South Yorkshire	S9	No		-
Ecclesfield Cemetery	?	Sheffield	South Yorkshire	S35	No		-
Handsworth Cemetery	?	Sheffield	South Yorkshire	S13	No		-
Shiregreen Cemetery	?	Sheffield	South Yorkshire	S5	No		-
Stocksbridge Cemetery	1950	Sheffield	South Yorkshire	S36	No		-
Wisewood Cemetery	?	Sheffield	South Yorkshire	S6	No		-
Woodhouse Cemetery	?	Sheffield	South Yorkshire	S13	No		-
South Stoneham Cemetery	1905	Southampton	Hampshire	SO18	1978		-
Southampton Old Cemetery	1846	Southampton	Hampshire	SO15	No		Yes
Southern Cemetery	1879	Chorlton-cum-Hardy	Greater Manchester	M21	TBC		Yes
St James Cemetery	1829	Liverpool	Merseyside	L1	1936		Yes
St Michael's Cemetery	1862	Sheffield	South Yorkshire	S6	TBC		-
St Sepulchre's Cemetery	1848	Oxford	Oxfordshire	OX1	TBC		-
Stoney Royd Cemetery	1861	Halifax	West Yorkshire	HX3	TBC		-
Tinsley Park Cemetery	1882	Sheffield	South Yorkshire	S9	No		-
Thorncliffe Cemetery and Crematorium	1872	Barrow-in-Furness	Cumbria	LA14	TBC		-
Townsend Cemetery	1874	Crewkerne	Somerset	TA18	No		-
Toxteth Park Cemetery	1856	Liverpool	Merseyside	L8	TBC		-
Undercliffe Cemetery	1854	Bradford	West Yorkshire	BD3	TBC		-
Wardsend Cemetery	1859	Sheffield	South Yorkshire	S6	1980		-
Warstone Lane Cemetery	1848	Birmingham	West Midlands	B18	TBC	Closed to new burials	-
Weaste Cemetery	1857	Salford	Greater Manchester	M5	TBC		Yes
Welford Road Cemetery	1849	Leicester	Leicestershire	LE2	TBC		-
West Derby Cemetery	1884	Liverpool	Merseyside	L11	TBC		-
The West Pennine Remembrance Park	2002	Blackburn with Darwen	Lancashire	BL7	No	Natural burial ground	Yes
Westmill Woodland Burial Ground	2011	Vale of White Horse	Oxfordshire	SN6	TBC	Natural burial ground	Yes
Witton Cemetery	1863	Birmingham	West Midlands	B6	TBC	Closed to new burials	-
Wolvercote Cemetery	1889	Oxford	Oxfordshire	OX2	TBC		-
Woodhouse Cemetery	1835	Leeds	West Yorkshire	LS2	1969		-
Wombwell Cemetery	1868	Wombwell	South Yorkshire	S73	No		Yes
York Cemetery, York	1837	York	North Yorkshire	YO10	TBC		-
