= List of crematoria in England =

This list is sorted by ceremonial county.

== Bedfordshire ==
- Bedford Crematorium
- The Vale Crematorium, Luton

== Berkshire ==
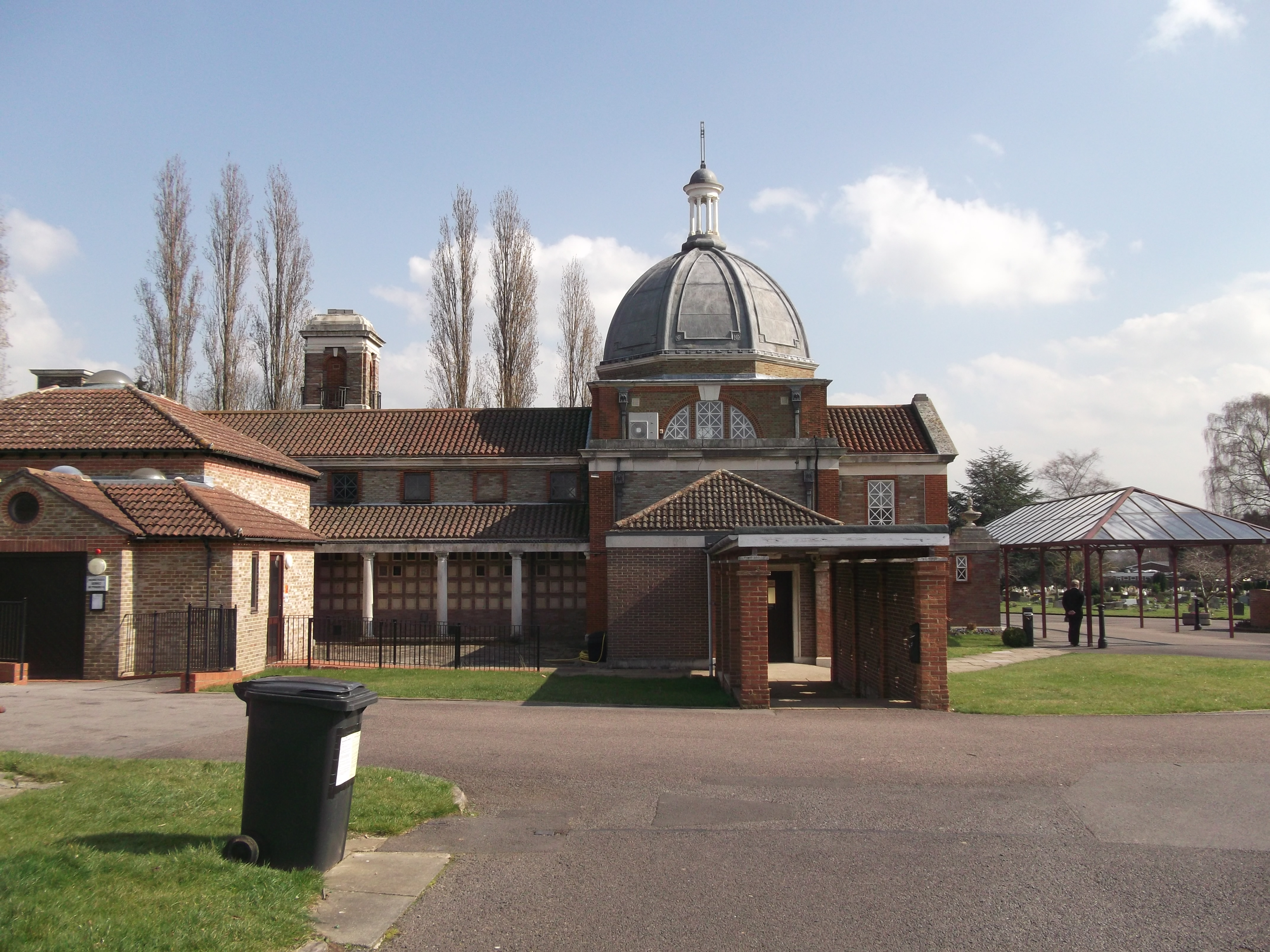
Reading Crematorium

- Easthampstead Park Cemetery and Crematorium, Bracknell
- Reading Crematorium
- Slough Cemetery and Crematorium
- West Berkshire Crematorium, Thatcham

== Bristol ==
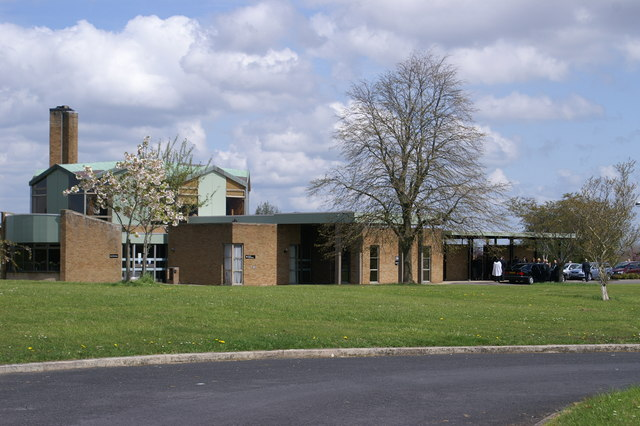
South Bristol Crematorium

- Arnos Vale Crematorium (defunct)
- Canford Crematorium, Westbury-on-Trym
- South Bristol Crematorium, Bedminster Down

== Buckinghamshire ==
- Aylesbury Vale Crematorium, Aylesbury
- Bierton Crematorium, Aylesbury
- Chilterns Crematorium, Amersham
- Crownhill Crematorium, Milton Keynes

== Cambridgeshire ==
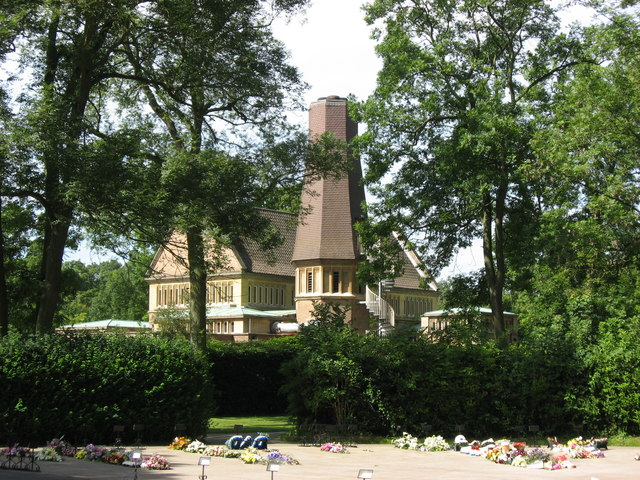
Peterborough Crematorium

- Cambridge Crematorium
- Fenland Crematorium, March
- Peterborough Crematorium, Bretton

== Cheshire ==
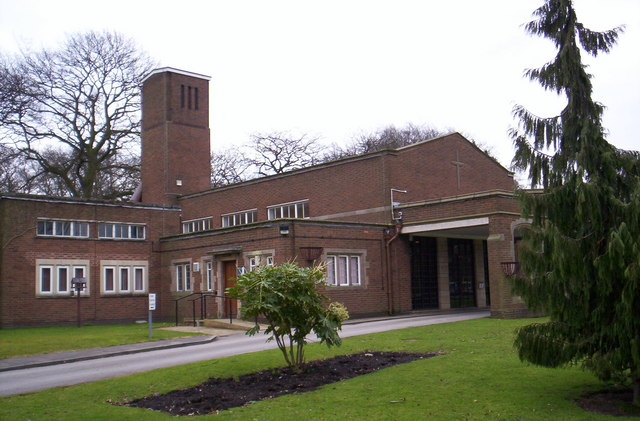
Walton Lea Crematorium

- Blacon Crematorium and Cemetery, Chester
- Crewe Crematorium and Cemetery
- Macclesfield Crematorium
- Vale Royal Crematorium, Davenham, Northwich
- Walton Lea Crematorium, Warrington
- Widnes Crematorium

== Cornwall ==
- Glynn Valley Crematorium, Bodmin
- Penmount Crematorium, Truro
- Treswithian Down Crematorium, Camborne

== Cumbria ==
- Beetham Hall Crematorium, Kendal
- Carlisle Crematorium
- Distington Hall Crematorium, Workington
- Eden Valley Crematorium, Penrith
- Thorncliffe Crematorium, Barrow-in-Furness

== Derbyshire ==
- Amber Valley Crematorium, Swanwick
- Bretby Crematorium, Burton-on-Trent
- Brimington Crematorium, Chesterfield
- Heanor Crematorium
- Markeaton Crematorium, Derby
- Trent Valley Crematorium, Aston-on-Trent, Derby

== Devon ==
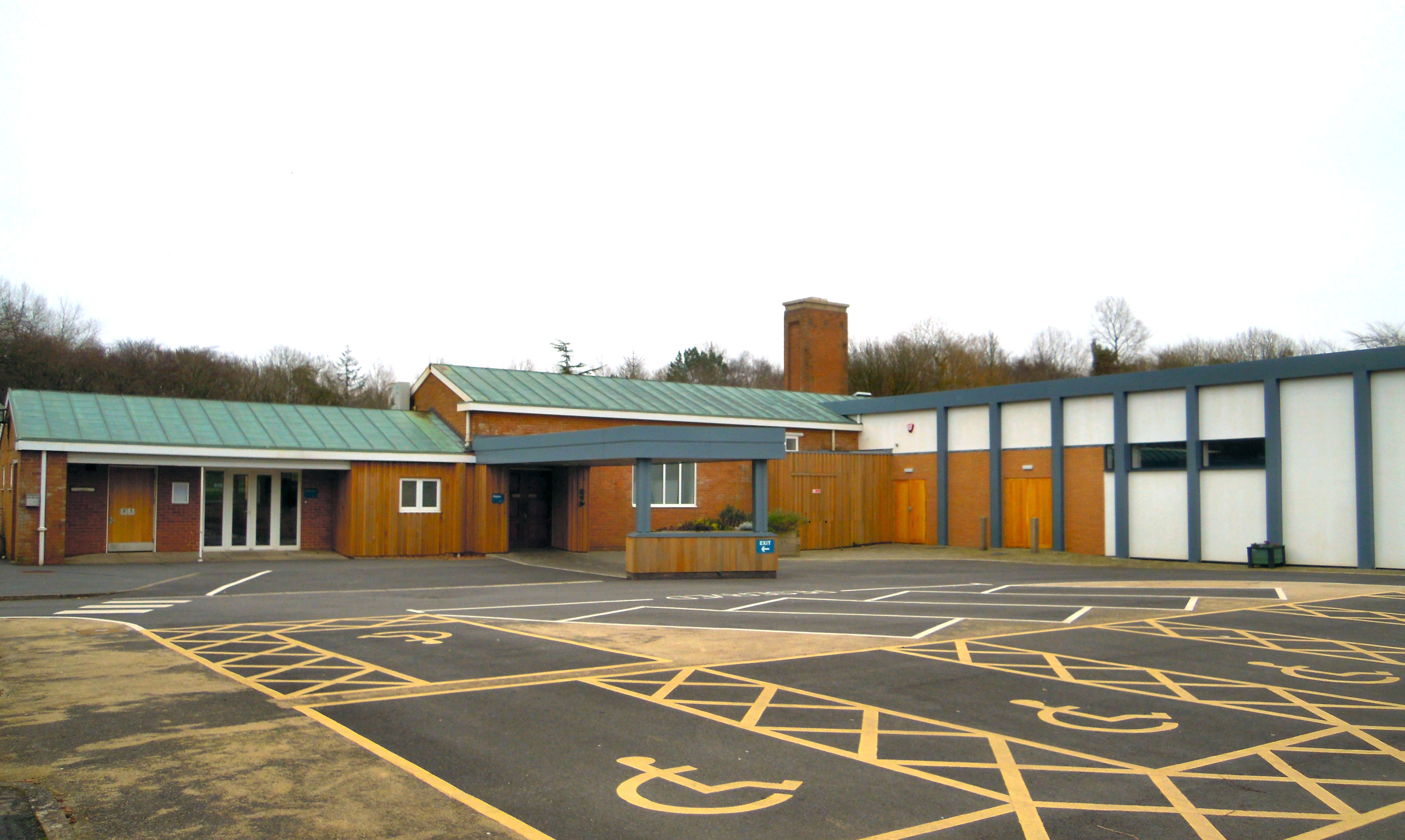
North Devon Crematorium - Aspen chapel left and Rowan right

- East Devon Crematorium, Whimple
- Efford Cemetery and Crematorium, Plymouth
- Exeter and Devon Crematorium, Exeter
- North Devon Crematorium, Barnstaple
- Torbay Cemetery and Crematorium, Torquay
- Weston Mill Cemetery and Crematorium, Plymouth

== Dorset ==
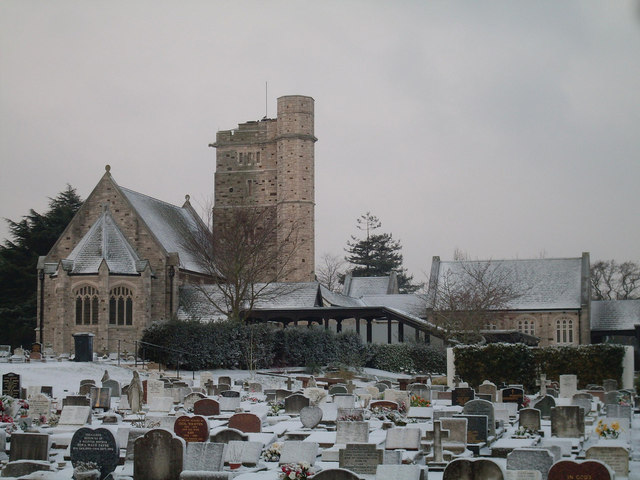
Bournemouth Crematorium

- Bournemouth Crematorium
- Harbour View Crematorium, Lytchett Minster
- Poole Crematorium
- Weymouth Crematorium

== Durham ==
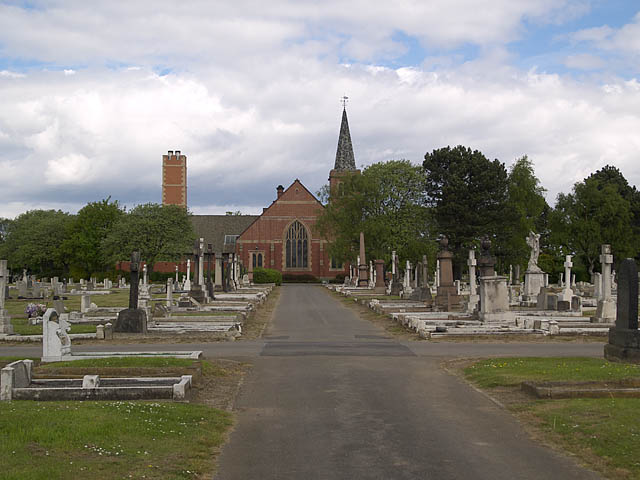
Stranton Grange cemetery, with Hartlepool Crematorium left of picture

- Darlington Crematorium
- Durham Crematorium
- Hartlepool Crematorium, Stranton Grange Cemetery, Hartlepool
- Mountsett Crematorium, Stanley
- Stockton-On-Tees Crematorium
- Wear Valley Crematorium, Bishop Auckland

== East Riding of Yorkshire ==
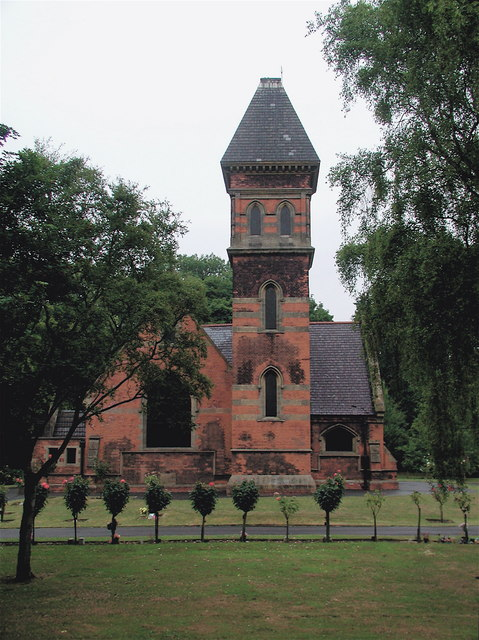
Hedon Road Cemetery crematorium, Hull (defunct)

- Chanterlands Crematorium, Kingston-upon-Hull
- East Riding Crematorium, Driffield
- Haltemprice Crematorium
- Hedon Road Crematorium, Kingston-upon-Hull (defunct)
- Lelley Fields Crematorium, Preston

== East Sussex ==
- Downs Crematorium, Brighton
- Eastbourne Crematorium
- Hastings Crematorium
- Woodvale Crematorium, Brighton
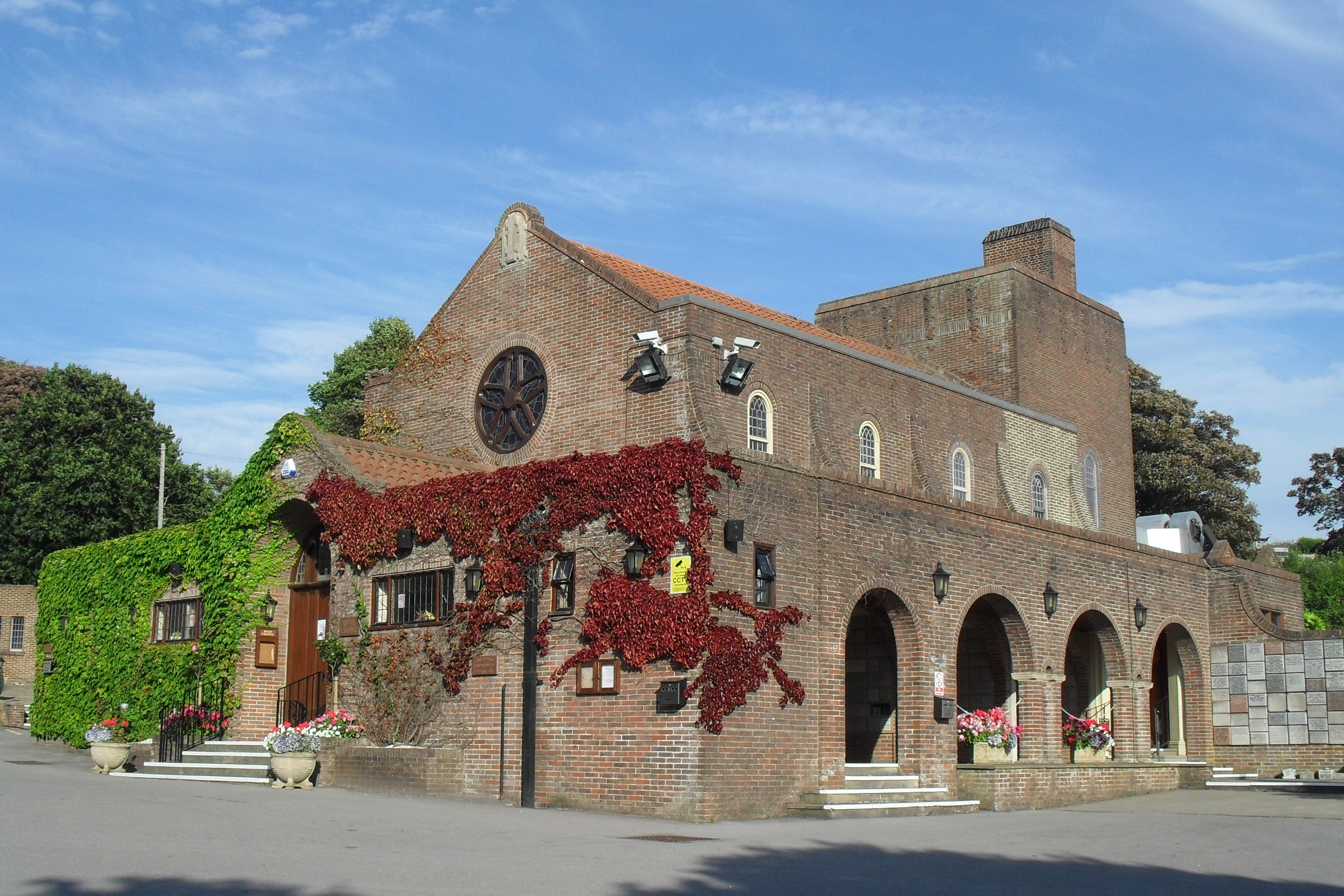
The Downs Crematorium, Brighton.

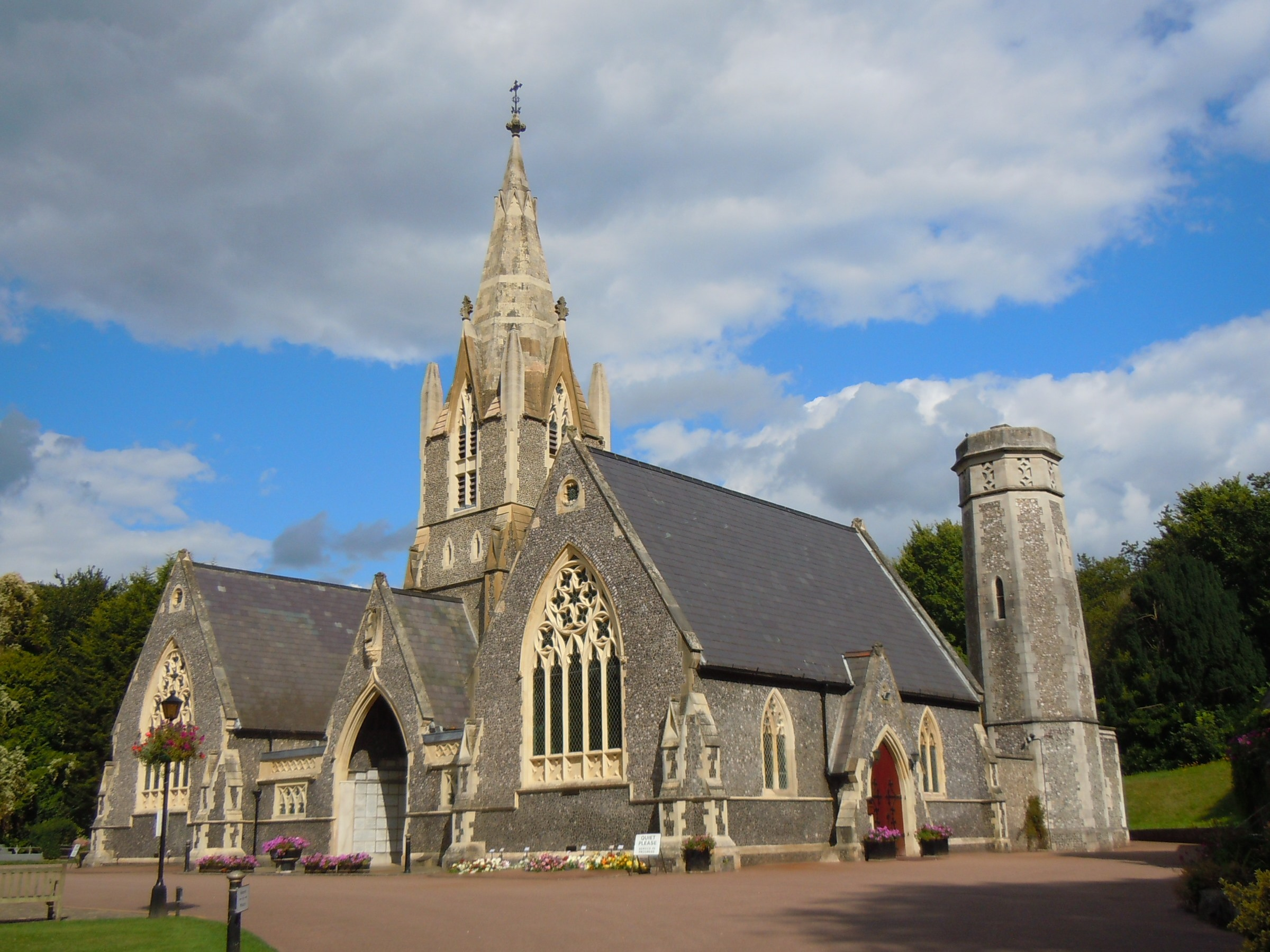
Woodvale Crematorium, Brighton.

== Essex ==
- Basildon Crematorium
- Benfleet Crematorium
- Bentley Crematorium and Cemetery, Brentwood
- Cam Valley Crematorium, Saffron Walden
- Chelmsford Crematorium
- Colchester Crematorium
- Harlow Crematorium
- Harwich Crematorium
- Southend Crematorium
- Three Counties Crematorium, Braintree
- Weeley Crematorium, Clacton-on-Sea

== Gloucestershire ==
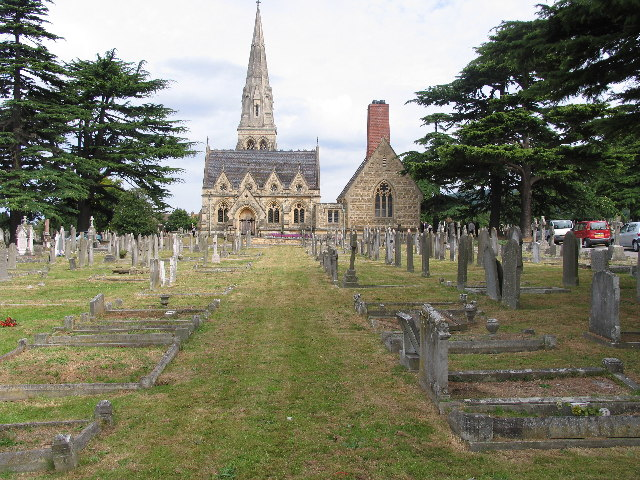
Cheltenham Crematorium (right, conjoined to Cemetery Chapel)

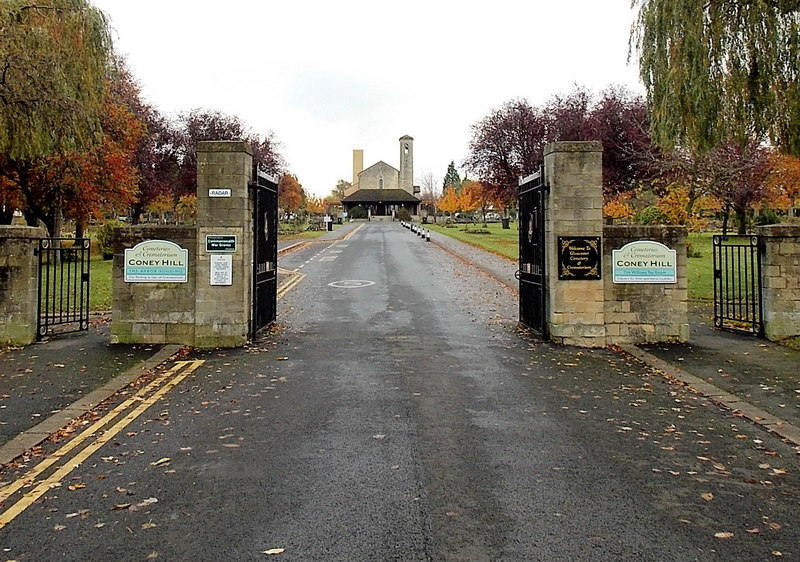
Gloucester Crematorium, located in Coney Hill Cemetery
- Cheltenham Crematorium
- Forest of Dean Crematorium, Lydney
- Gloucester Crematorium
- Westerleigh Crematorium

== Greater London ==
- Beckenham Crematorium and Cemetery
- Breakspear Crematorium, Ruislip
- City of London Cemetery and Crematorium
- Croydon Crematorium (located inside Mitcham Road Cemetery)
- East Finchley Cemetery and Crematorium
- East London Cemetery and Crematorium, Plaistow, Newham
- Eltham Crematorium
- Enfield Crematorium
- Forest Park Cemetery and Crematorium, Hainault
- Golders Green Crematorium
- Hendon Cemetery and Crematorium
- Honor Oak Crematorium, Camberwell
- Islington Crematorium
- Kingston Upon Thames Crematorium
- Lambeth Crematorium
- Lewisham Crematorium, Hither Green
- Manor Park Cemetery and Crematorium
- Mortlake Crematorium
- New Southgate Cemetery and Crematorium
- North East Surrey Crematorium, Morden
- Putney Vale Cemetery and Crematorium
- South Essex Crematorium, Upminster
- South West Middlesex Crematorium, Hanworth
- South London Crematorium, Streatham Park
- West London Crematorium, Kensal Green
- West Norwood Cemetery and Crematorium
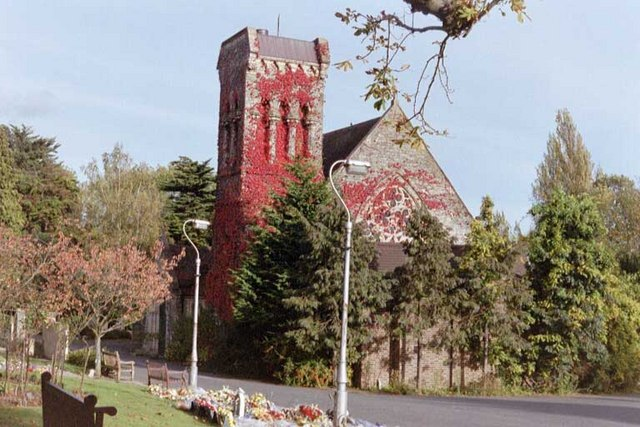
Beckenham Crematorium

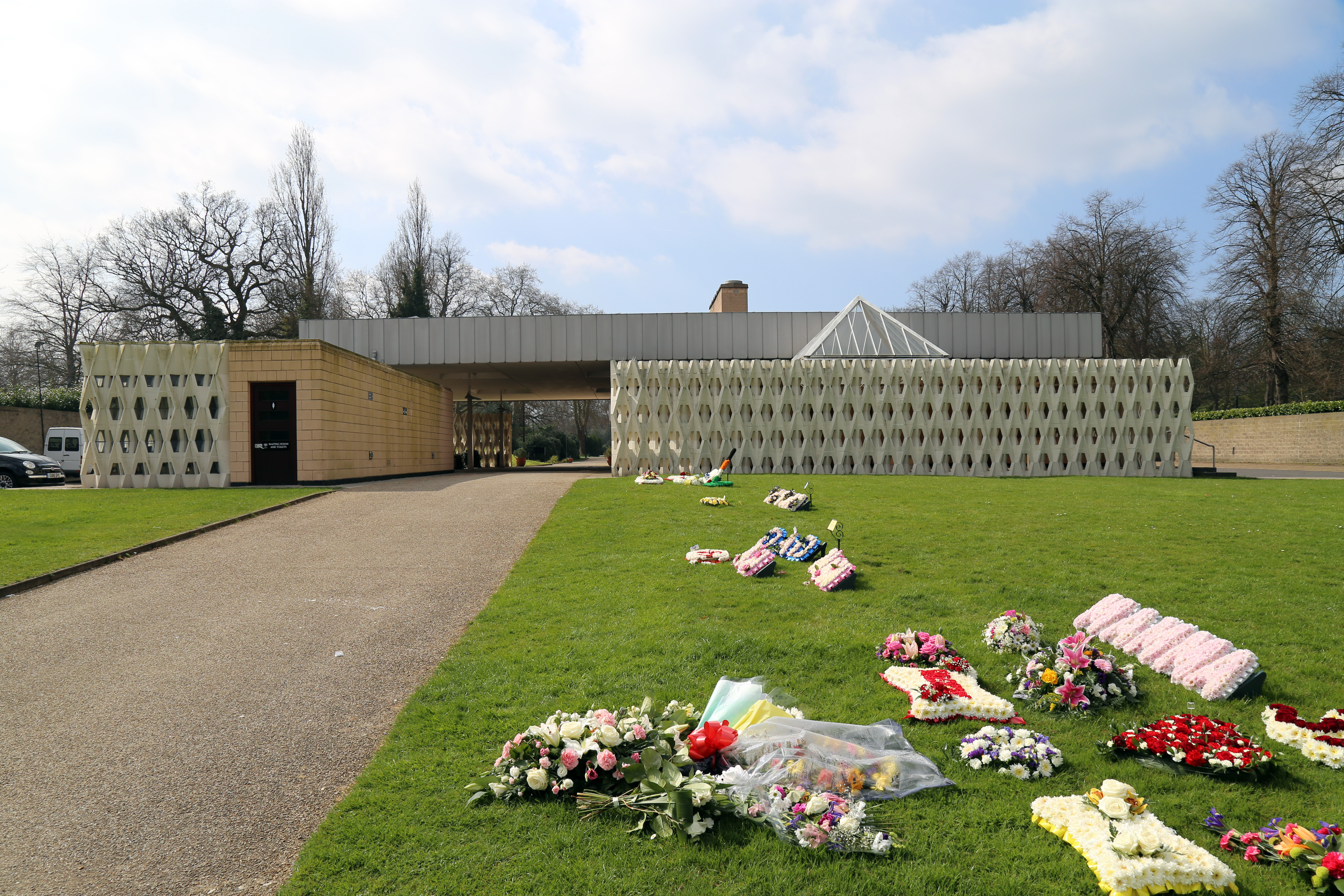
City of London Crematorium

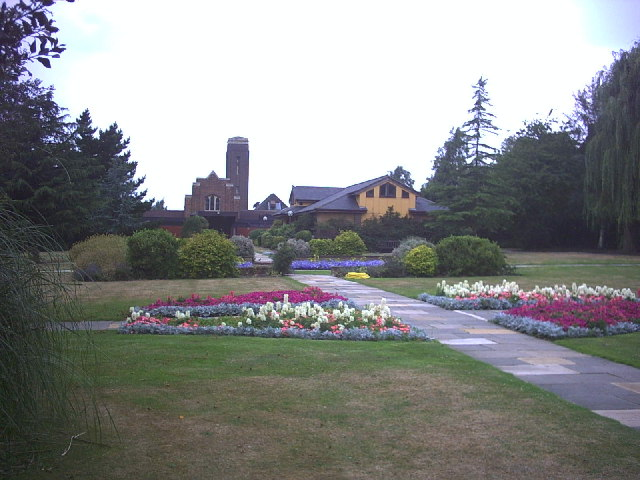
Croydon Crematorium

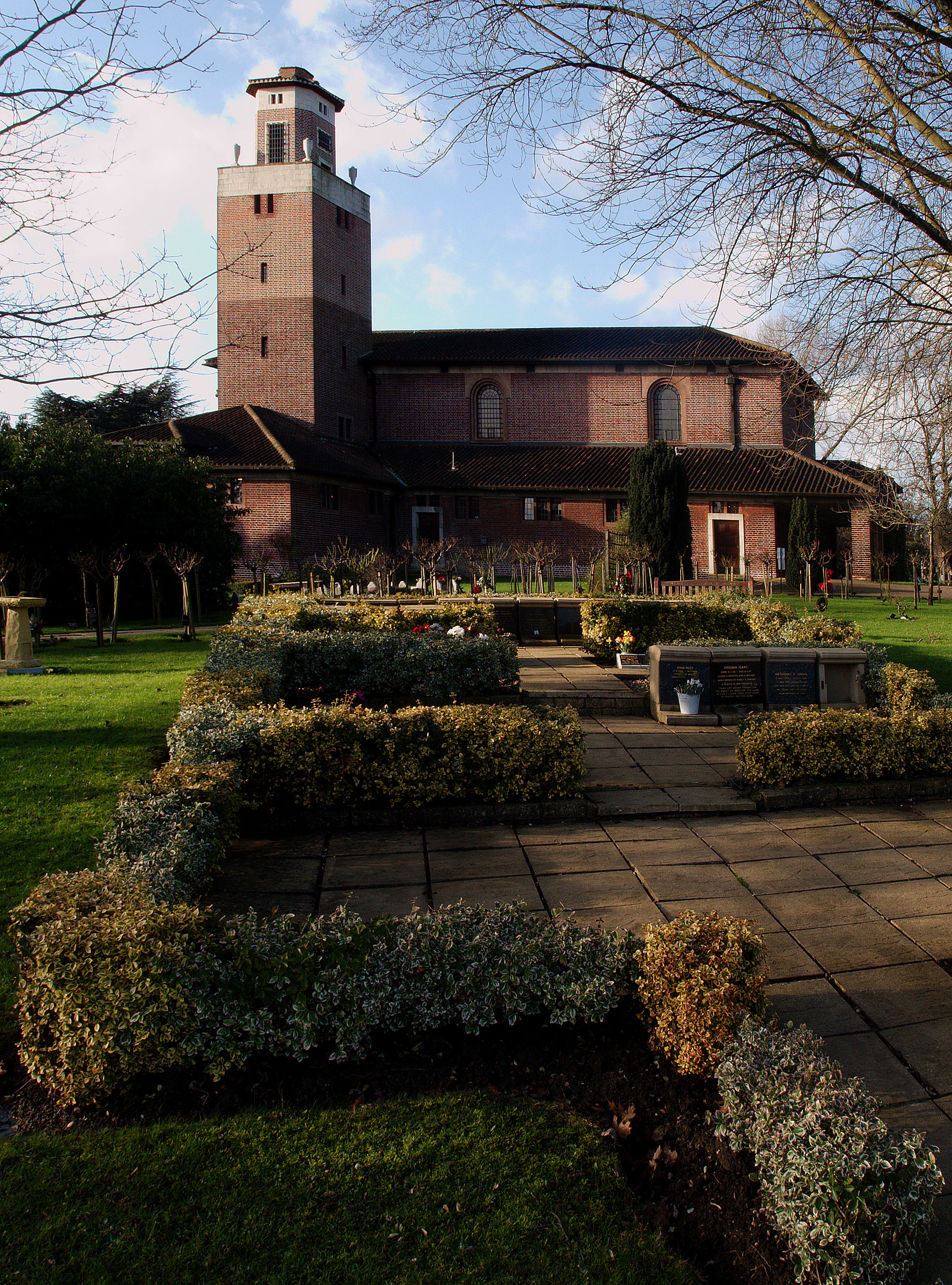
Crematorium, East Finchley Cemetery

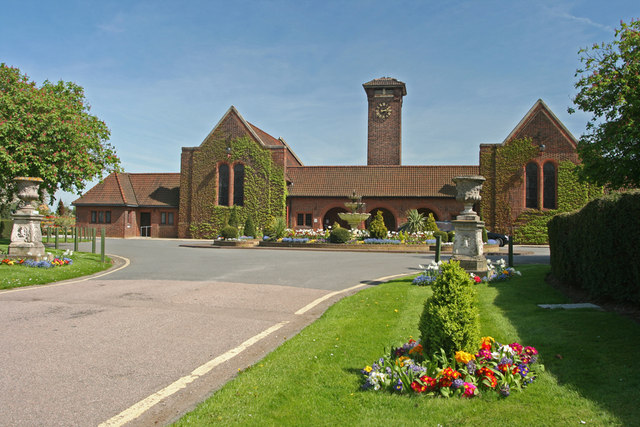
Enfield Crematorium

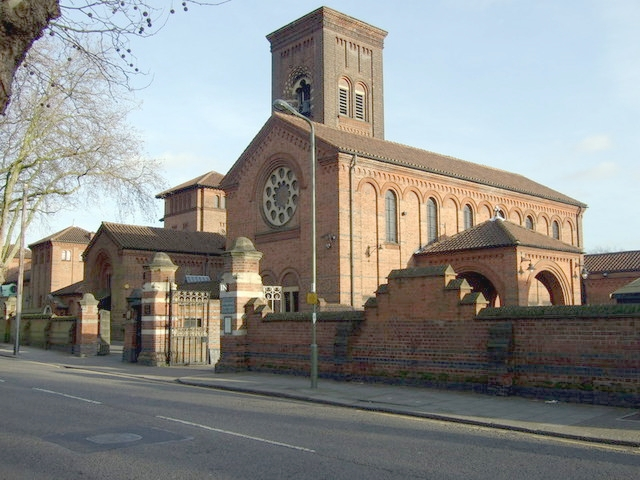
Golders Green Crematorium

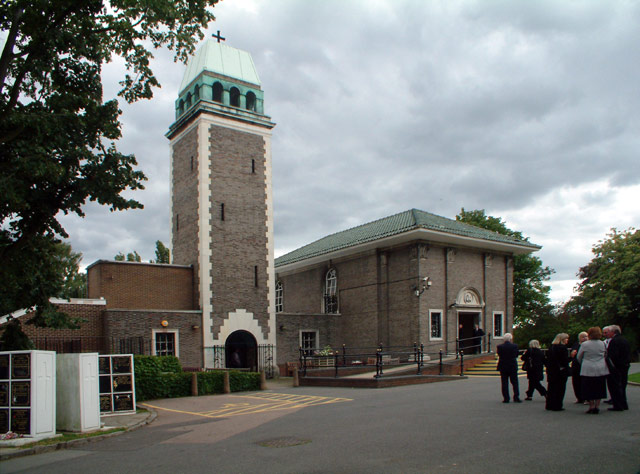
Honor Oak Crematorium

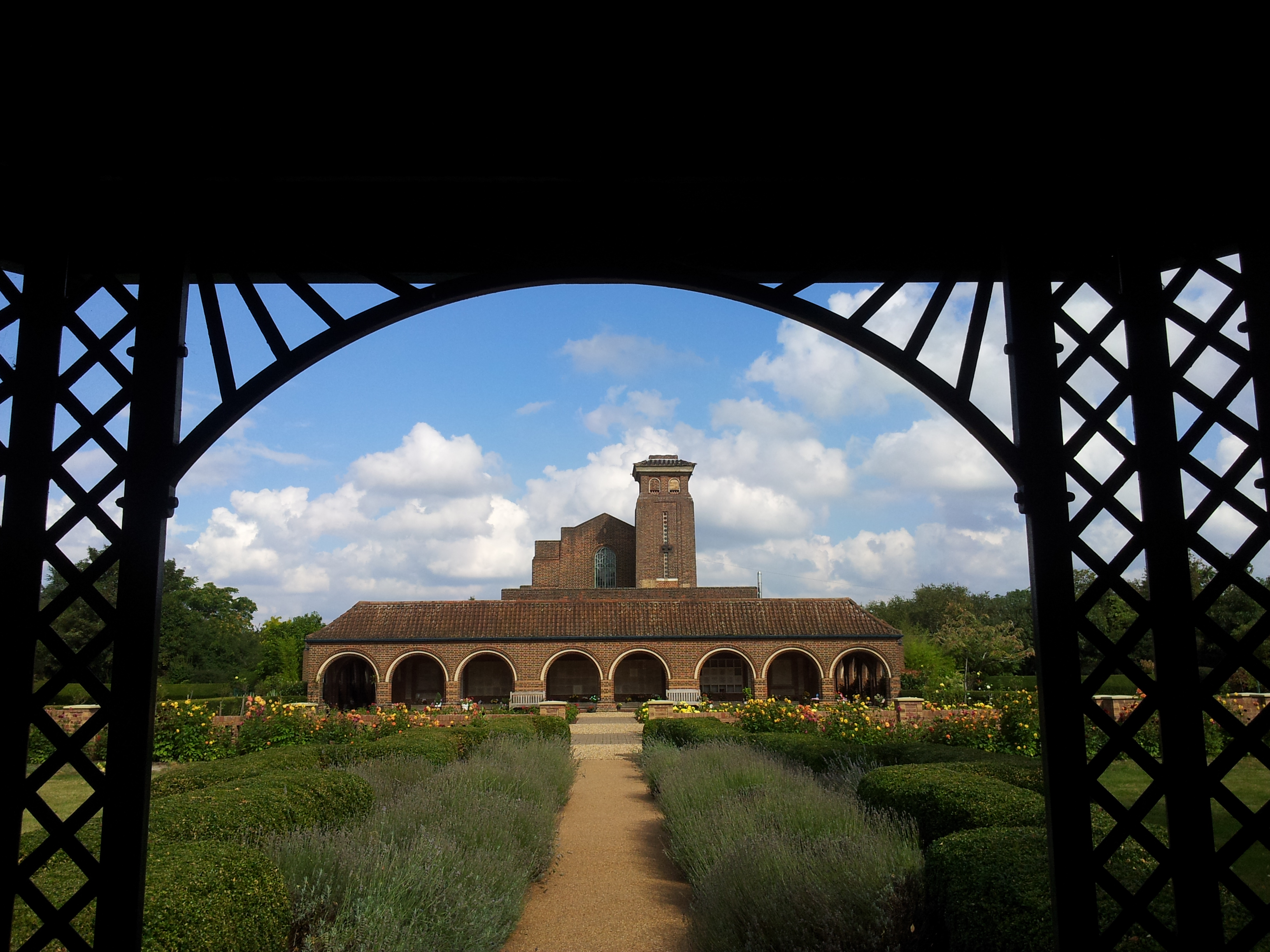
Mortlake Crematorium

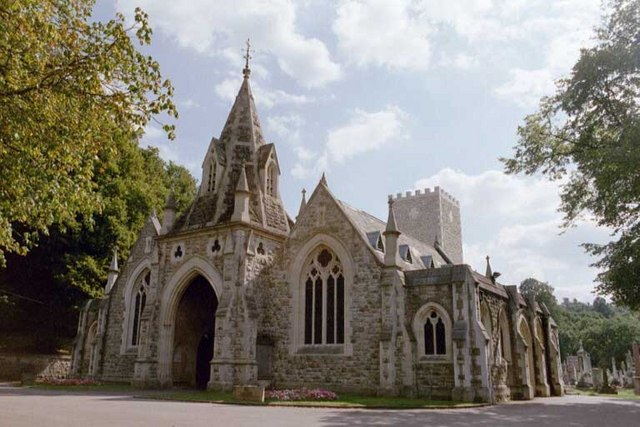
Putney Vale Crematorium

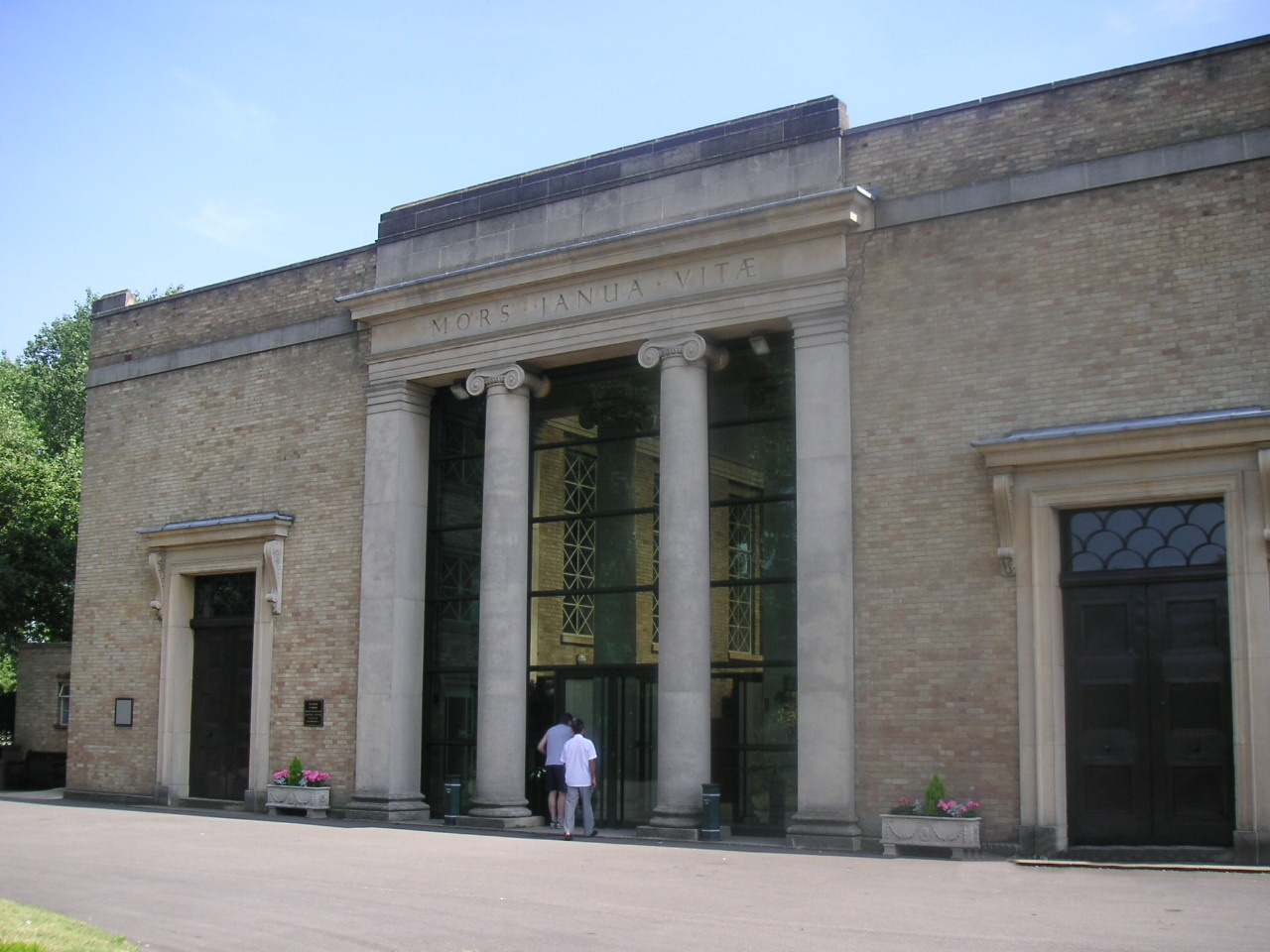
West London Crematorium, located in Kensal Green Cemetery

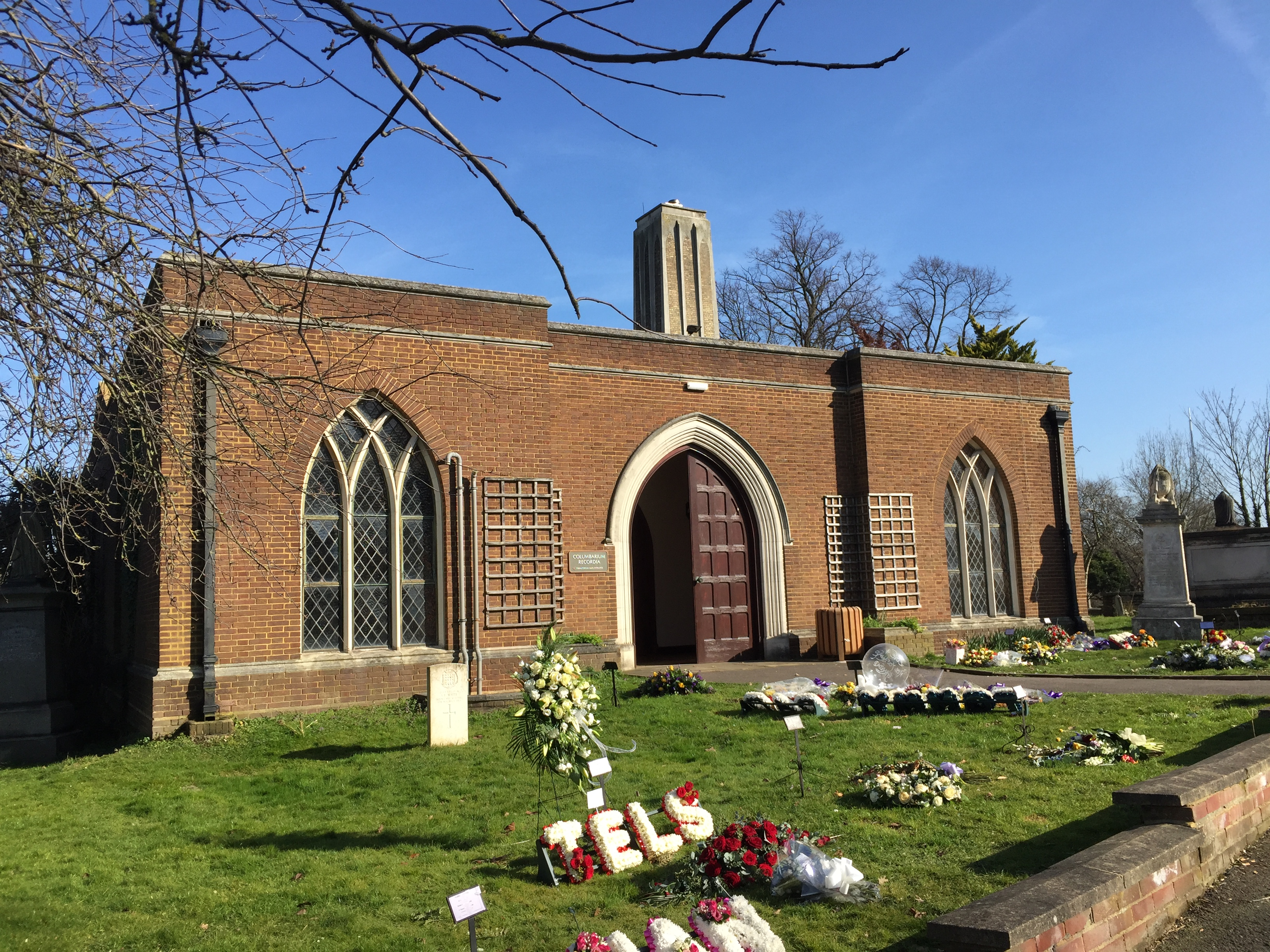
West Norwood Crematorium

== Greater Manchester ==
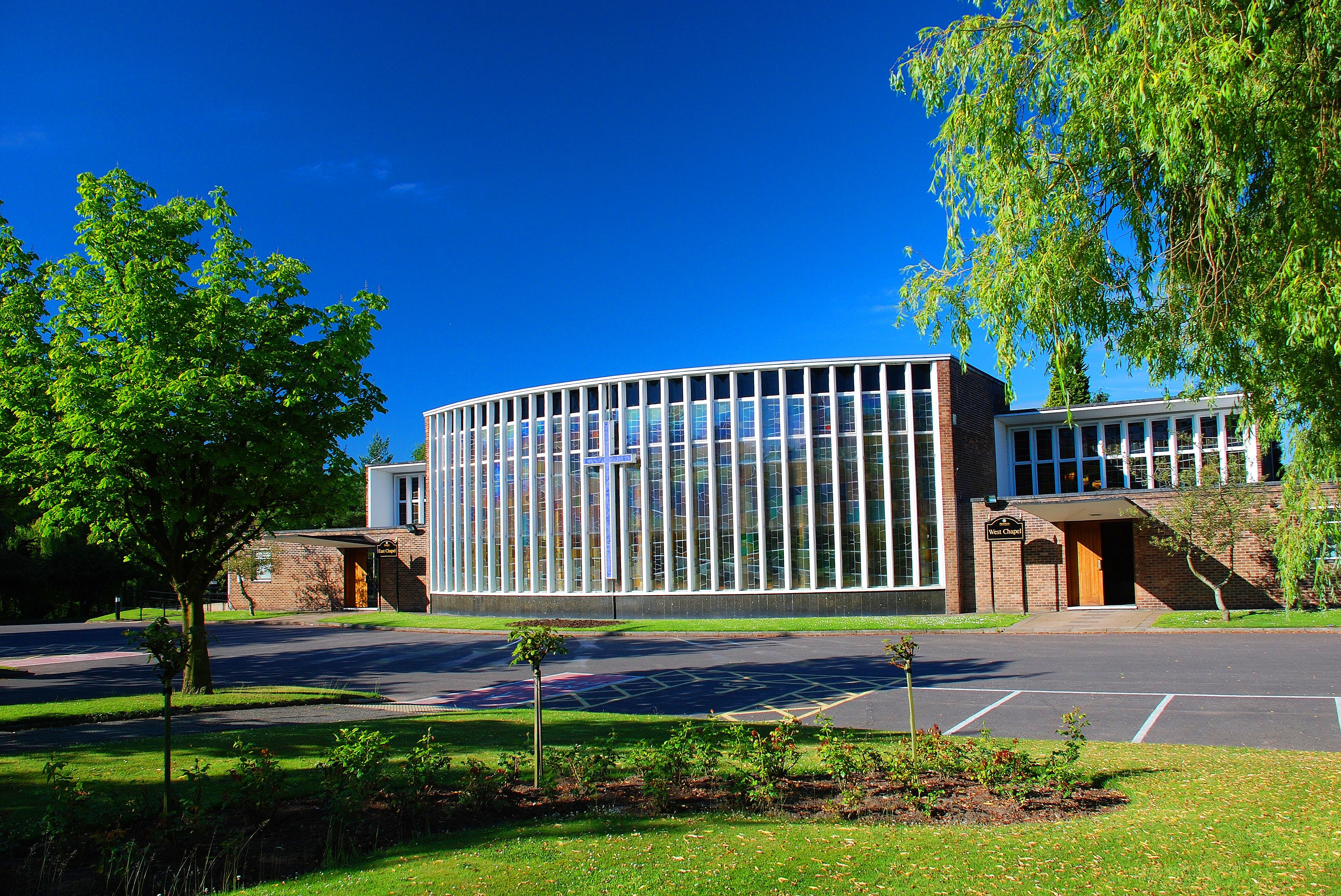
Blackley Crematorium

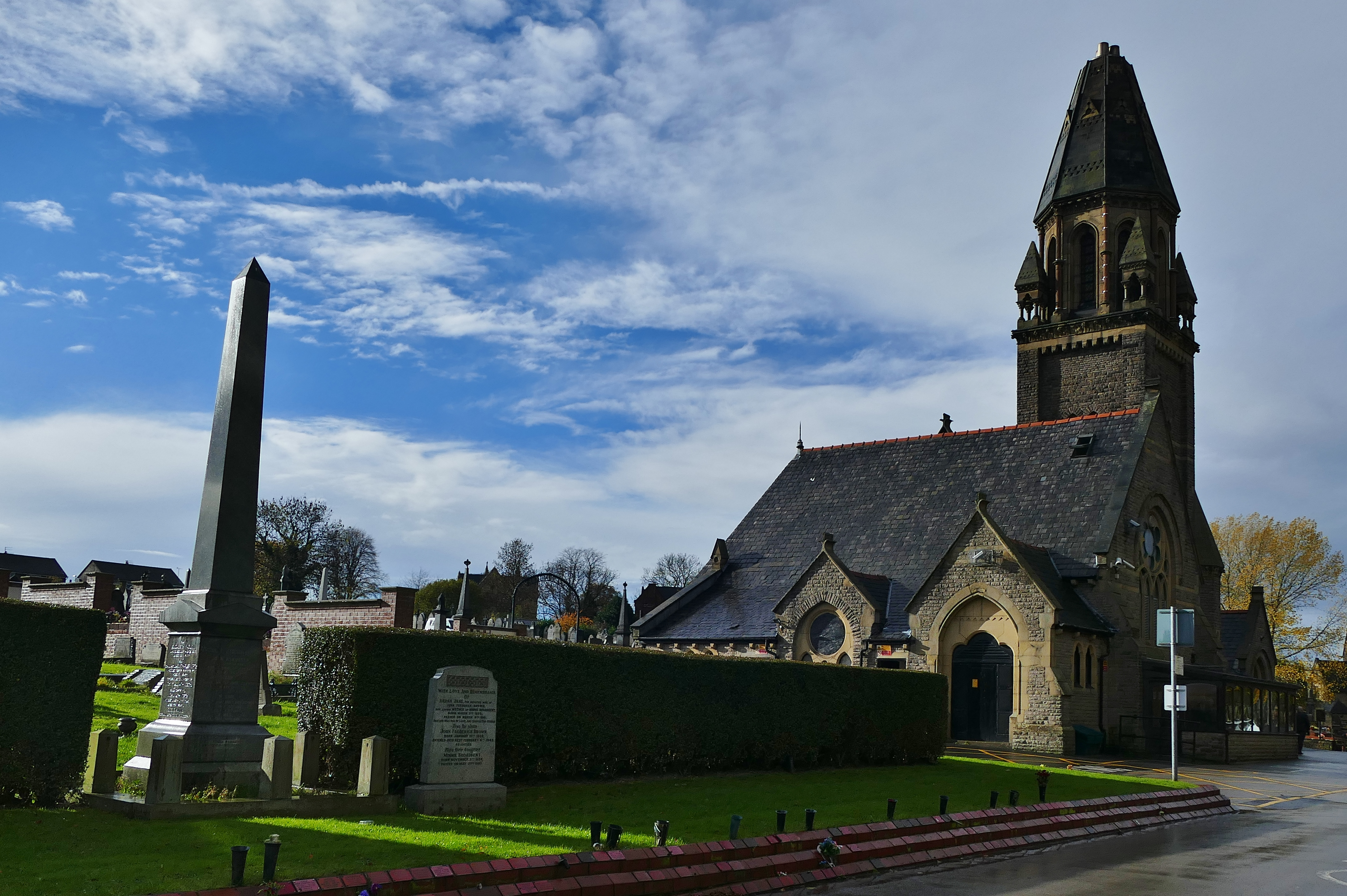
Dukinfield Crematorium External View

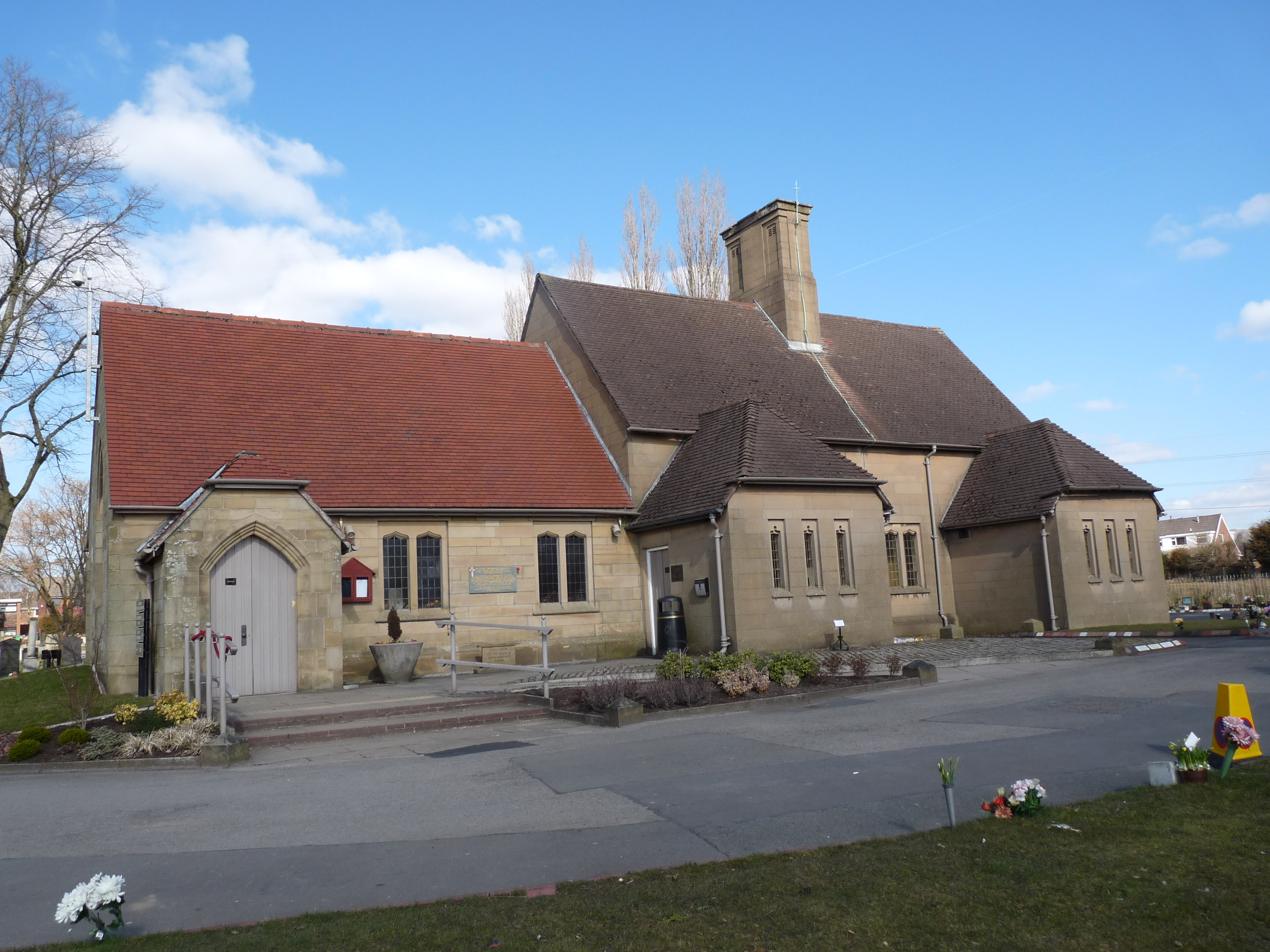
Middleton Crematorium
- Bolton Crematorium
- Blackley Crematorium
- Dukinfield Crematorium
- Dunham Crematorium, Altrincham
- East Lancashire Crematorium, Radcliffe
- Howe Bridge Crematorium, Atherton
- Manchester Crematorium
- Middleton Crematorium, Manchester
- Oldham Crematorium
- Peel Green Crematorium, Eccles
- Rochdale Crematorium
- Salford Crematorium
- Stockport Crematorium
- Wigan Crematorium

== Hampshire ==
- Basingstoke Crematorium
- Charlton Park Crematorium, Andover
- New Forest Crematorium, New Milton
- The Oaks Crematorium, Havant
- Park Crematorium, Aldershot
- Portchester Crematorium
- South Stoneham Crematorium, Southampton (defunct)
- Southampton Crematorium
- Test Valley Crematorium, near Romsey
- Wessex Vale Crematorium, Hedge End, Eastleigh
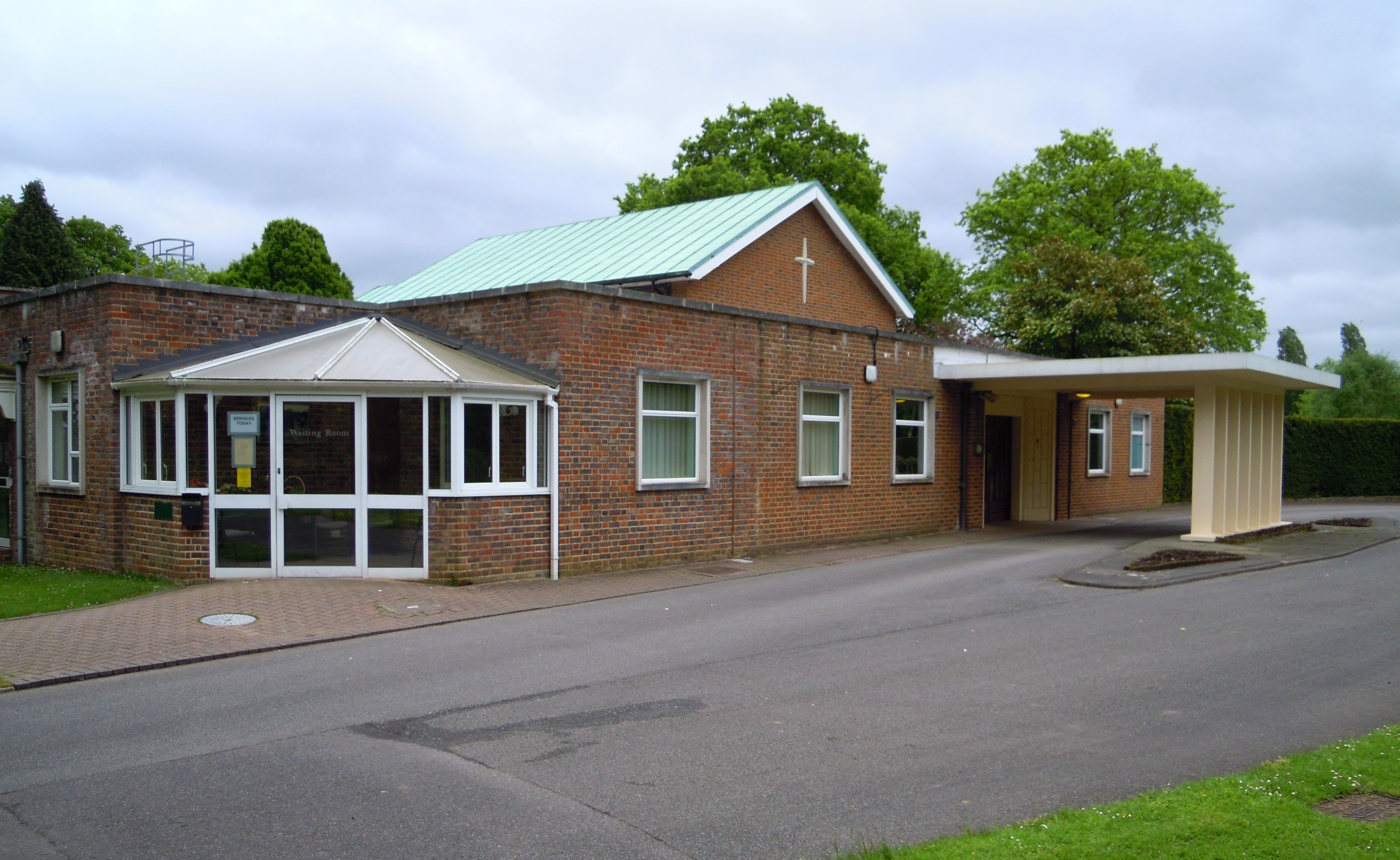
Park Crematorium in Aldershot

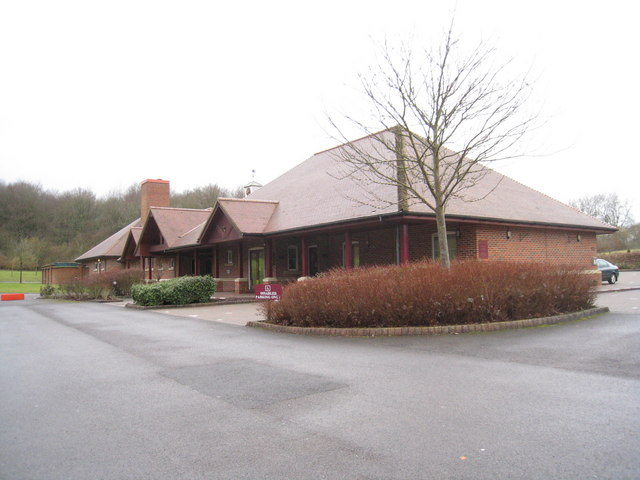
Basingstoke Crematorium

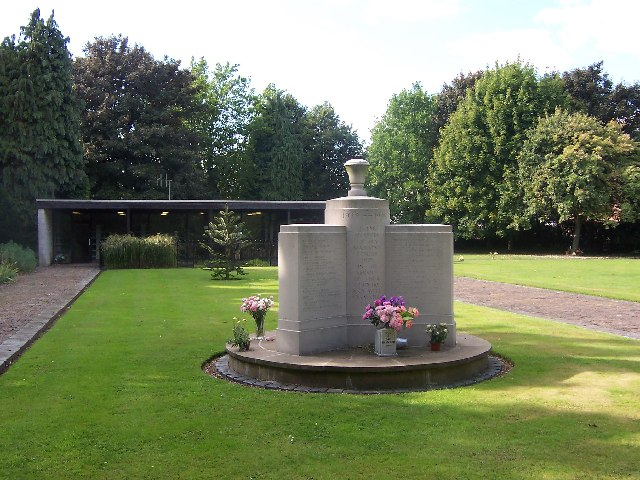
Memorial at site of South Stoneham Crematorium, Southampton

== Herefordshire ==
- Hereford Crematorium and Cemetery

== Hertfordshire ==
- Harwood Park Crematorium, Stevenage
- Hemel Hempstead Crematorium
- North Hertfordshire Crematorium, Hitchin
- West Hertfordshire Crematorium, Garston, Watford
- Woollensbrook Cemetery and Crematorium, Hoddesdon

== Isle of Wight ==
- Isle of Wight Crematorium, Whippingham

== Kent ==
- Barham Crematorium, Canterbury
- Bluebell Cemetery and Crematorium, Halstead, Sevenoaks
- Charing Crematorium, near Ashford
- Garden of England Crematorium, Sittingbourne
- Hawkinge Cemetery and Crematorium, Folkestone
- Kent and Sussex Crematorium and Cemetery, Tunbridge Wells
- Medway Crematorium, Rochester
- Thamesview Crematorium, Gravesend
- Thanet Crematorium, Margate
- Vinter Park Crematorium, Maidstone

== Lancashire ==
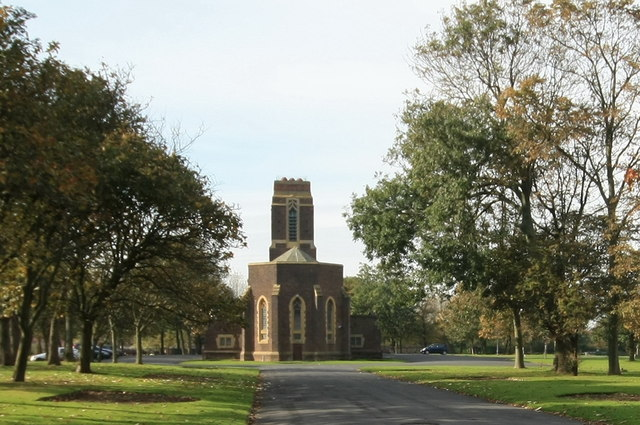
Carleton Crematorium, Blackpool

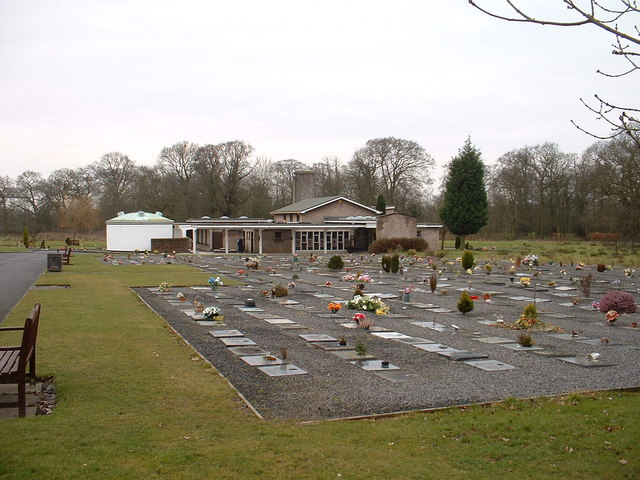
Preston Crematorium
- Accrington Crematorium
- Burnley Crematorium
- Carleton Crematorium and Cemetery, Blackpool
- Charnock Richard Crematorium, Chorley
- Lancaster and Morecambe Crematorium, Lancaster
- Lytham Crematorium
- Pleasington Crematorium, Blackburn
- Preston Crematorium
- West Lancashire Cemetery and Crematorium, Burscough, Ormskirk

== Leicestershire ==
- Gilrose Crematorium, Leicester
- Great Glen Crematorium, Leicester
- Loughborough Crematorium
- South Leicestershire Crematorium and Memorial Park, Countesthorpe

== Lincolnshire ==
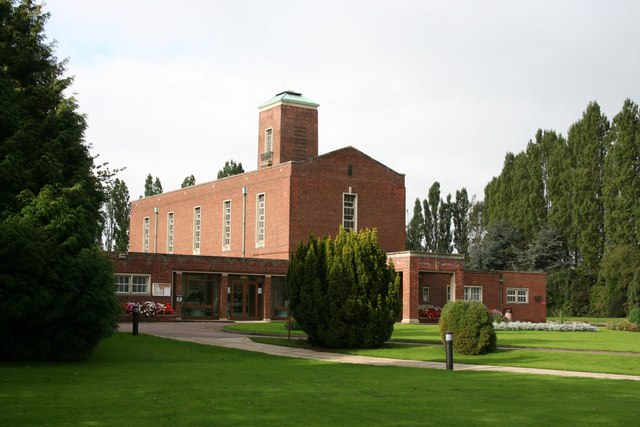
Grimsby Crematorium

- Alford Crematorium
- Boston Crematorium
- Grantham Crematorium
- Grimsby Crematorium
- Lea Fields Crematorium, Lea, near Gainsborough
- Lincoln Crematorium
- South Lincolnshire Crematorium, Surfleet, near Spalding
- Woodlands Crematorium, Scunthorpe

== Merseyside ==
- Anfield Crematorium, Liverpool
- Landican Cemetery and Crematorium, Birkenhead
- St Helen's Crematorium
- Southport Crematorium
- Springwood Crematorium, Liverpool
- Thornton Crematorium, Crosby

== Norfolk ==
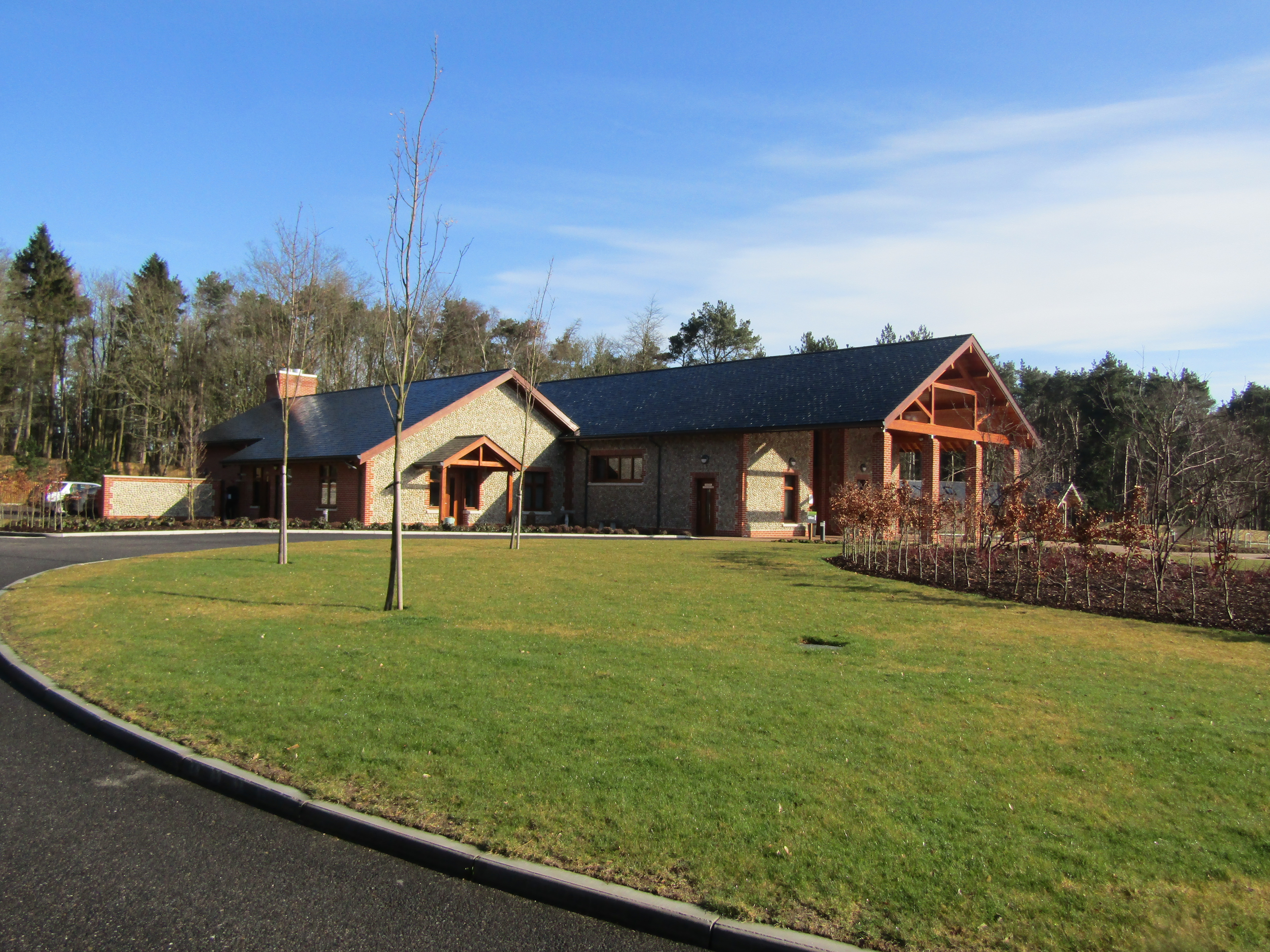
Cromer Crematorium

- Breckland Crematorium, Norwich
- Cromer Crematorium
- Earlham Crematorium, Norwich
- Great Yarmouth Crematorium, Gorleston-on-Sea
- Horsham St Faith Crematorium, Norwich
- Mintlyn Crematorium, Kings Lynn

== Northamptonshire ==
- Counties Crematorium, Northampton
- Nene Valley Crematorium, Wellingborough
- Warren Hill Crematorium, Kettering

== Northumberland ==
- Blyth Valley and Wansbeck Crematorium, Blyth
- Northumberland Woodland Burial and Crematorium, Morpeth

== North Yorkshire ==
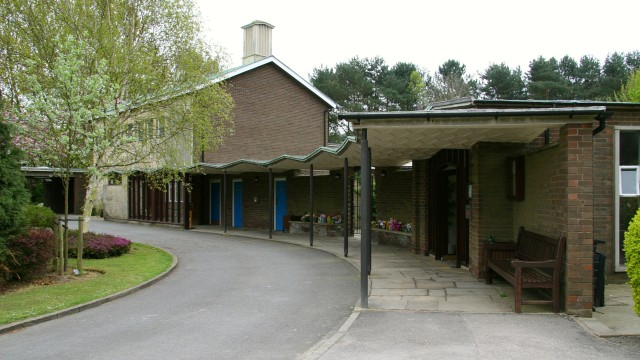
Woodlands Crematorium, Scarborough

- Kirkleatham Crematorium, Yearby
- Maple Park Crematorium, Thirsk
- Teesside Crematorium, Middlesbrough
- Skipton Crematorium
- Stonefall Crematorium, Harrogate
- Woodlands Crematorium, Scarborough
- York Crematorium

== Nottinghamshire ==
- Babworth Crematorium, Retford
- Barnby Moor Crematorium, Retford
- Bramcote Crematorium, Nottingham
- Gedling Crematorium, Nottingham
- Mansfield Crematorium
- Rushcliffe Oaks Crematorium, Stragglethorpe
- Sherwood Forest Crematorium, New Ollerton
- Wilford Hill Cemetery and Crematorium, Nottingham

== Oxfordshire ==
- Banbury Crematorium
- North Oxfordshire Crematorium and Memorial Park, Tackley, near Kidlington
- Oxford Crematorium, Headington, Oxford
- South Oxfordshire Crematorium and Memorial Park, Garford, near Abingdon

== Shropshire ==
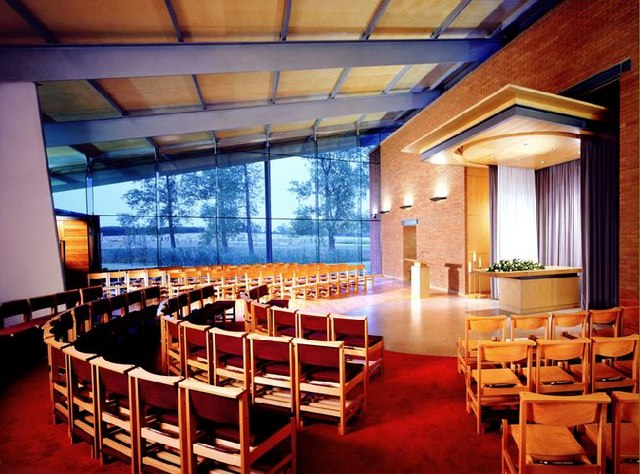
Chapel of Telford Crematorium

- Emstrey Crematorium and Cemetery, Shrewsbury
- Telford Crematorium

== Somerset ==
- Haycombe Crematorium, Bath
- Mendip Crematorium, Wells
- Sedgemoor Crematorium, Bridgwater
- Taunton Deane Crematorium
- Weston Super Mare Crematorium
- Yeovil Crematorium

== South Yorkshire ==
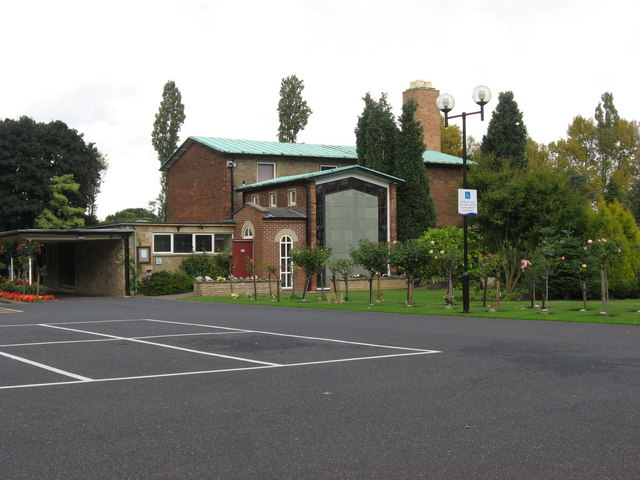
Doncaster Crematorium

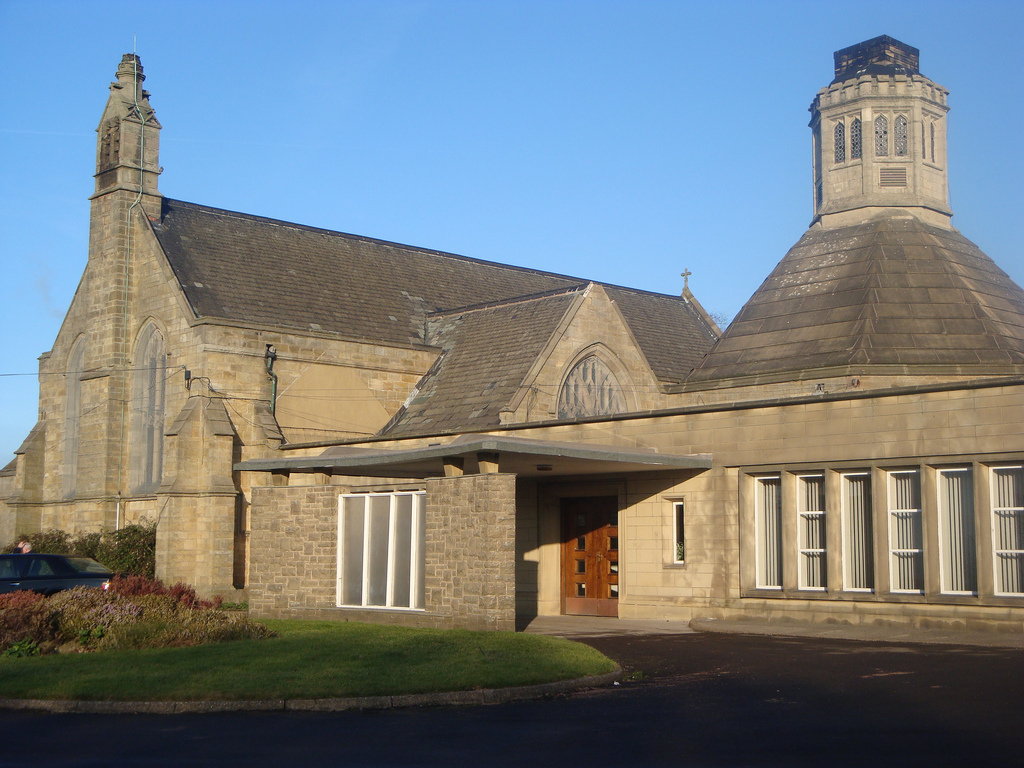
Sheffield Crematorium, located in City Road Cemetery
- Barnsley Crematorium
- Rose Hill Crematorium, Doncaster
- Grenoside Crematorium, Sheffield
- Hutcliffe Wood Crematorium, Sheffield
- Rotherham Crematorium
- Sheffield Crematorium, City Road Cemetery, Sheffield

== Staffordshire ==
- Bradwell Crematorium, Newcastle-under-Lyme
- Carmountside Crematorium, Stoke-on-Trent
- Lichfield and District Crematorium, Fradley, near Lichfield
- Mercia Forest Crematorium, Essington
- Stafford Crematorium

== Suffolk ==
- Ipswich Crematorium
- Seven Hills Crematorium, Nacton, Ipswich
- Waveney Crematorium, Beccles
- West Suffolk Crematorium, Bury St Edmunds

== Surrey ==
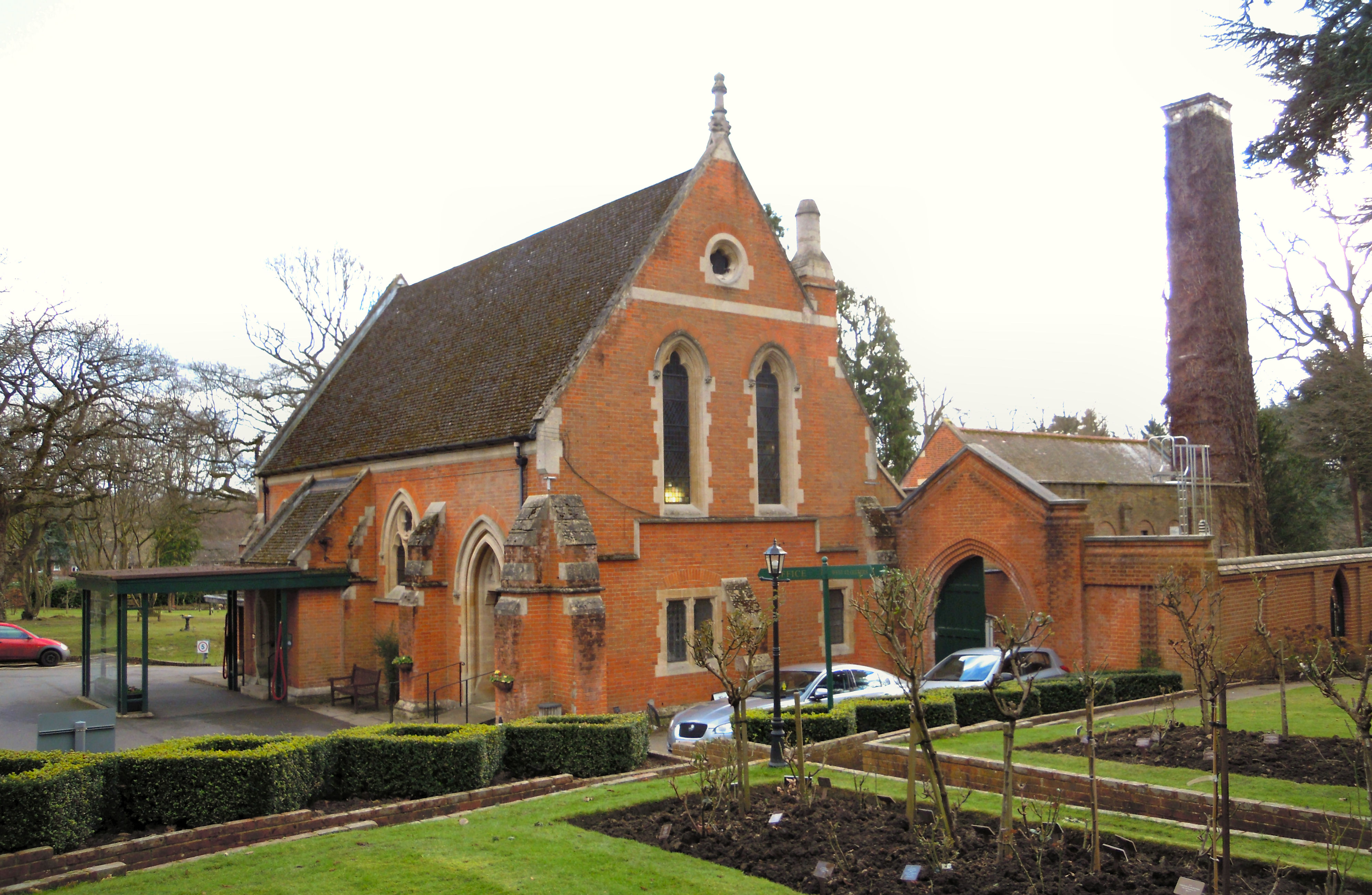
Woking Crematorium, the oldest in the United Kingdom.

- Guildford Crematorium
- Randalls Park Crematorium, Leatherhead
- Woking Crematorium

== Tyne and Wear ==
- Birtley Crematorium, Chester-le-Street
- Saltwell Crematorium, Gateshead
- South Tyneside Crematorium, South Shields
- Sunderland Crematorium
- Tynemouth Crematorium, North Shields
- West Road Crematorium, Newcastle upon Tyne

== Warwickshire ==
- Heart of England Crematorium, Nuneaton
- Oakley Wood Crematorium, near Leamington Spa
- Rugby and Daventry Crematorium, Rainsbrook, Rugby
- Woodlands Crematorium, Coleshill

== West Midlands ==
- Birmingham Crematorium, Perry Barr
- Bushbury Cemetery and Crematorium, Wolverhampton
- Canley Cemetery and Crematorium, Coventry
- Gornal Wood Cemetery and Crematorium, Brierley Hill
- Lodge Hill Crematorium, Birmingham
- Powke Lane Crematorium, Rowley Regis
- Robin Hood Cemetery and Crematorium, Solihull
- Ryecroft Crematorium, Walsall (defunct)
- Sandwell Valley Crematorium, West Bromwich
- Stourbridge Crematorium
- Streetly Crematorium, Walsall
- Sutton Coldfield Crematorium
- Yardley Crematorium, Birmingham
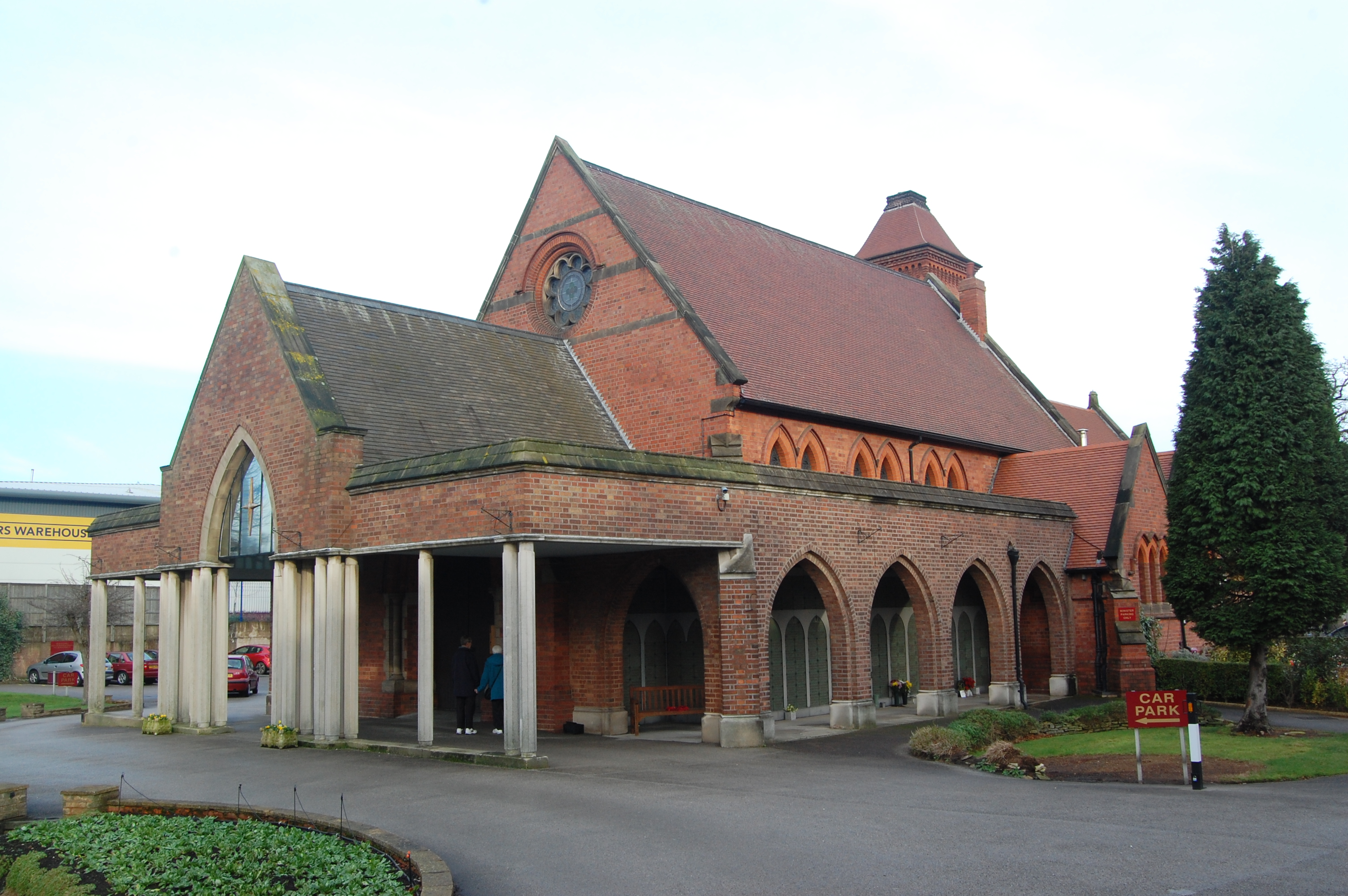
Birmingham Crematorium, Perry Barr

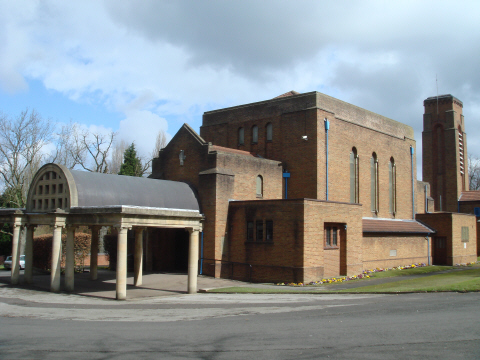
Lodge Hill Crematorium, Birmingham

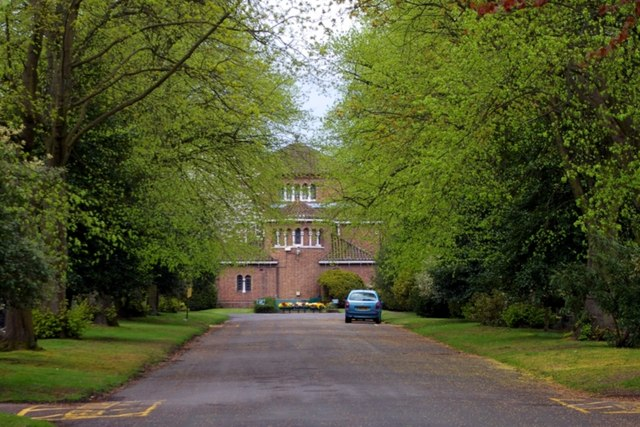
Robin Hood Crematorium, Solihull

== West Sussex ==
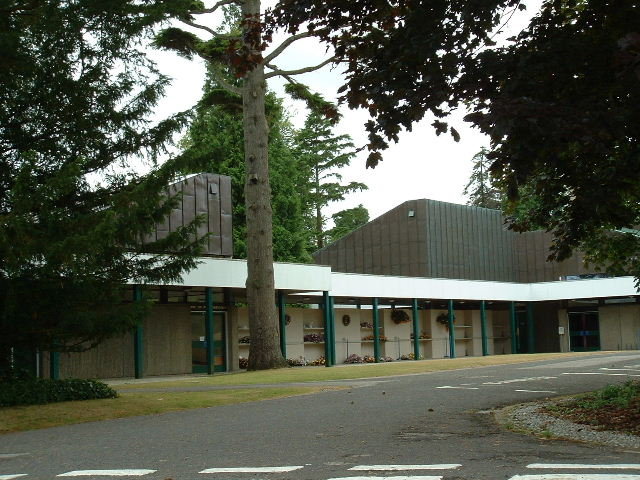
Worthing Crematorium.

- Chichester Crematorium
- Surrey and Sussex Crematorium, Worth, Crawley
- Worthing Crematorium

== West Yorkshire ==
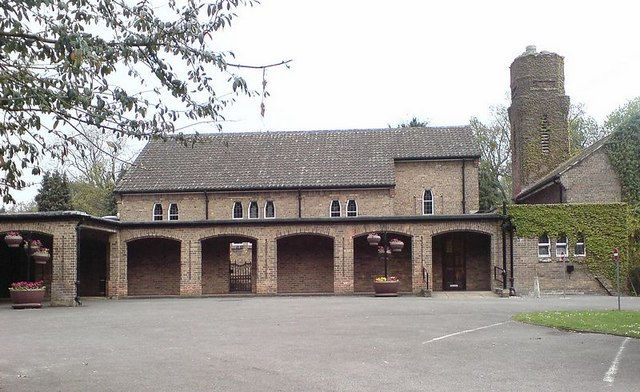
Rawdon Crematorium, Leeds

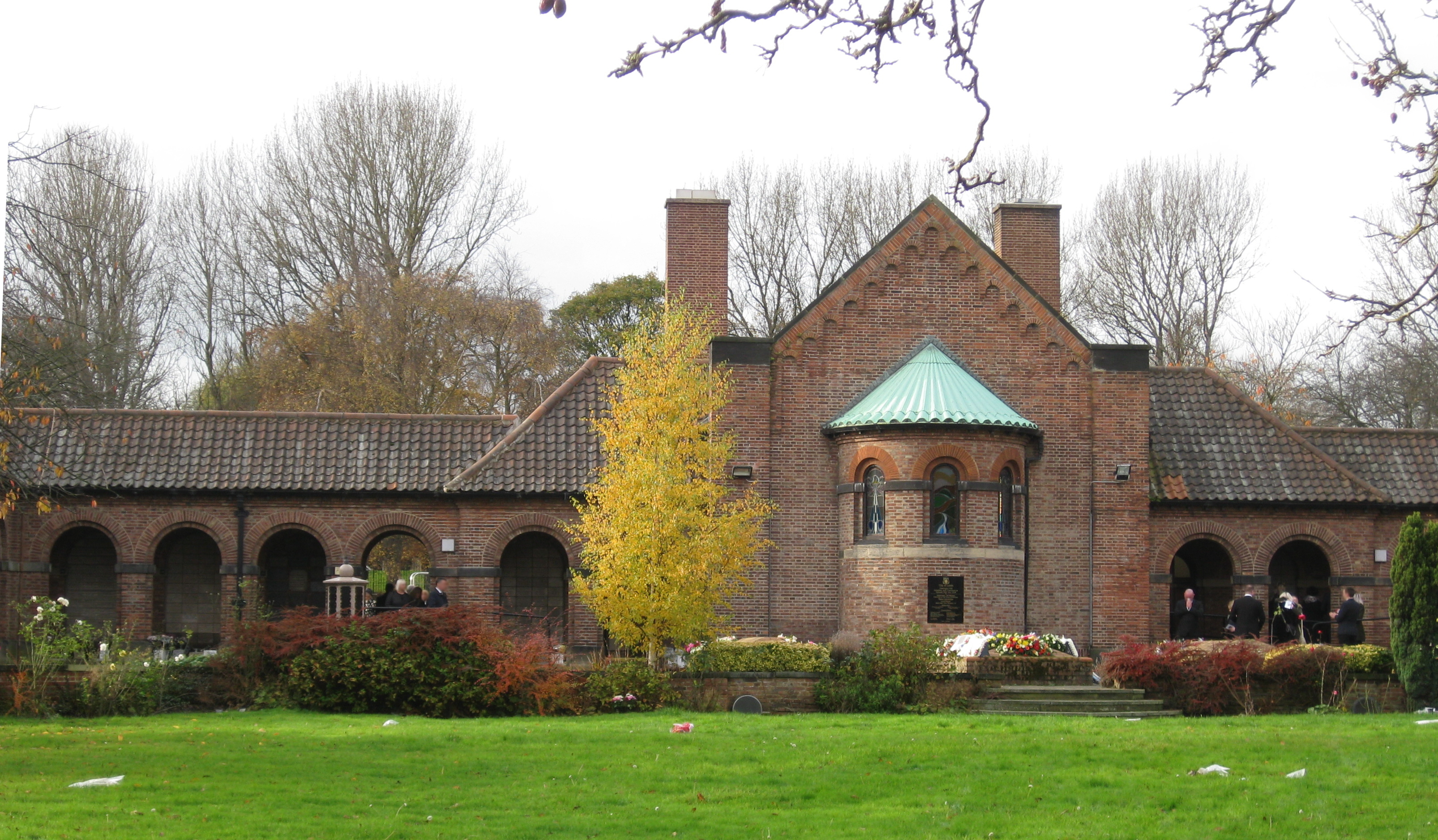
Crematorium chapel at Cottingley Hall Cemetery, Leeds
- Cottingley Hall Cemetery and Crematorium, Leeds
- Crigglestone Crematorium, Wakefield
- Dewsbury Moor Crematorium, Dewsbury
- Halifax Crematorium
- Huddersfield Crematorium
- Lawnswood Crematorium, Leeds
- Nab Wood Crematorium, Shipley (defunct)
- Oakworth Crematorium, Keighley
- Pontefract Crematorium
- Rawdon Crematorium, Leeds
- Scholemoor Crematorium, Bradford
- Shay Grange Crematorium, Heaton, Bradford

== Wiltshire ==
- Kingsdown Crematorium, Swindon
- North Wiltshire Crematorium, Royal Wootton Bassett
- Salisbury Crematorium
- West Wiltshire Crematorium, Semington, near Trowbridge

== Worcestershire ==
- Redditch Crematorium
- Vale Crematorium, Pershore
- Worcester Crematorium
- Wyre Forest Crematorium, Stourport-on-Severn
