= Thomas Turrall =

Recipient of the Victoria Cross

Thomas George Turrall VC
- Born: 5 July 1885; Birmingham, Warwickshire, England
- Died: 21 February 1964 (aged 78); Birmingham, Warwickshire, England
- Burial place: Robin Hood Cemetery, Solihull
- Military career
- Allegiance: United Kingdom
- Branch: British Army
- Rank: Private
- Units: Worcestershire Regiment
- Conflicts: World War I
- Awards: Victoria Cross

Thomas George Turrall VC (5 July 1885 – 21 February 1964) was an English recipient of the Victoria Cross, the highest and most prestigious award for gallantry in the face of the enemy that can be awarded to British and Commonwealth forces.

Turrall was 30 years old, and a private in the 10th Battalion, Worcestershire Regiment, British Army during the First World War when the following deed took place for which he was awarded the VC.

On 3 July 1916 at La Boiselle, France, during a bombing attack by a small party against the enemy, the officer in charge was badly wounded and the party was compelled eventually to retire. Private Turrall remained with the wounded officer for three hours under continuous and heavy fire from machine-guns and bombs. Notwithstanding that both he and the officer were at one time completely cut off from the British troops, he held his ground with determination and finally carried the officer to the British lines after a counter-attack had made this possible.

His Victoria Cross is displayed at The Worcestershire Regiment collections in the Worcester City Art Gallery & Museum, Worcester, England.

== Bibliography ==
- Gliddon, Gerald (2011) [1991]. Somme 1916. VCs of the First World War. The History Press. ISBN 978-0-7524-6303-2.
