= Robin Hood Cemetery =

Cemetery in West Midlands, England

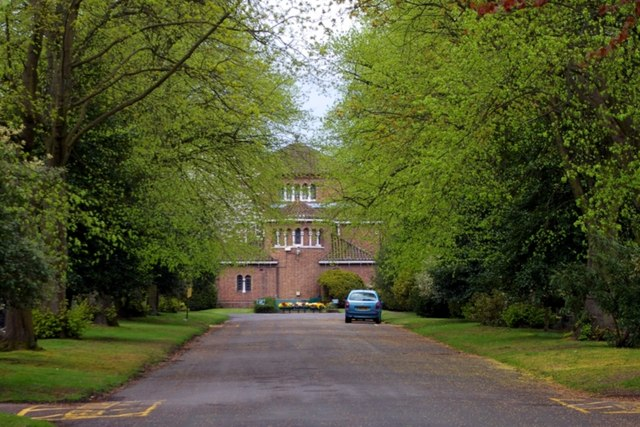
- Eastern view showing the oldest section of the building
- Interactive map of Robin Hood Cemetery

Details
- Established: 1917
- Location: Streetsbrook Road, Solihull, West Midlands
- Country: England
- Coordinates: 52.421°N 1.827°W
- Owned by: Solihull Metropolitan Borough Council
- Size: 45 acres (18 ha)
- Find a Grave: Robin Hood Cemetery

Robin Hood Cemetery and Crematorium is located near Shirley, West Midlands, within the Metropolitan Borough of Solihull, in the West Midlands. The cemetery was opened in 1917 and covers an area of 45 acres (18 ha) and comprises extensive landscaped lawn graves interspersed with ancient woodland. A cemetery chapel was built in 1931, and the crematorium was built in 1958, including for modifications to the chapel to cater for the cremation facilities.

There are 43 Commonwealth service personnel buried in the cemetery whose graves are registered and maintained by the Commonwealth War Graves Commission, 2 from World War I and 41 from World War II. A World War I Victoria Cross recipient, Thomas Turrall (1885–1964) is buried here.

Among those cremated here have been singer-songwriter Nick Drake in 1974, and Janet Parker, a medical photographer who in 1978 became the last person to die from smallpox, was cremated here in accordance with disease control measures.

The cemetery is very nearly full to capacity and the council generally only allows interments in existing graves. There are however above ground vaults, which were constructed in 2005, for cremated remains for which leases are available.

== See also ==
- List of cemeteries in England
