= Norton Cemetery, Sheffield =

Cemetery in Yorkshire, England

Coordinates: 53°20′50″N 1°28′32″W

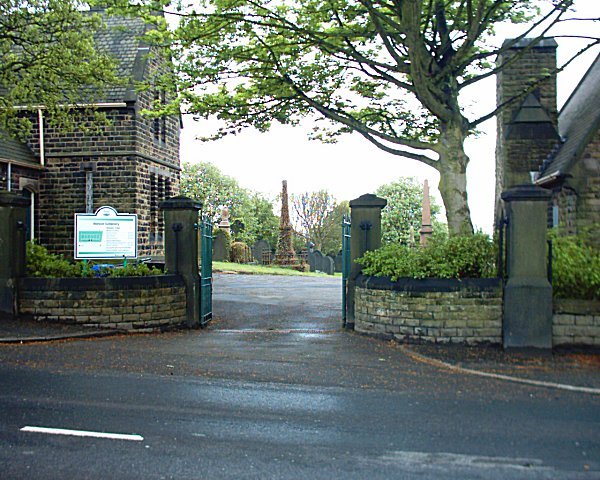
The cemetery's entrance gate

Norton Cemetery is one of the city of Sheffield's many cemeteries. It was opened on 6 June 1869, and covers 6 acres (24,000 m^{2}).

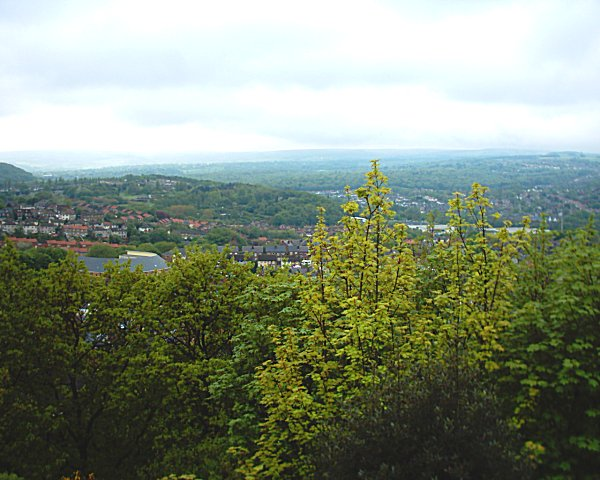
Views of Sheaf valley

Norton is a smaller cemetery running along two alleys spanning to the right and the left from the two gate houses (not listed). From the furthest graves and along the boundary wall, there are views of the Sheaf valley and the moors.

The cemetery contains 34 graves of Commonwealth service personnel, registered and maintained by the Commonwealth War Graves Commission, 27 from World War I and 7 from World War II.
