= Glastonbury Cemetery =

Cemetery in Somerset County, England

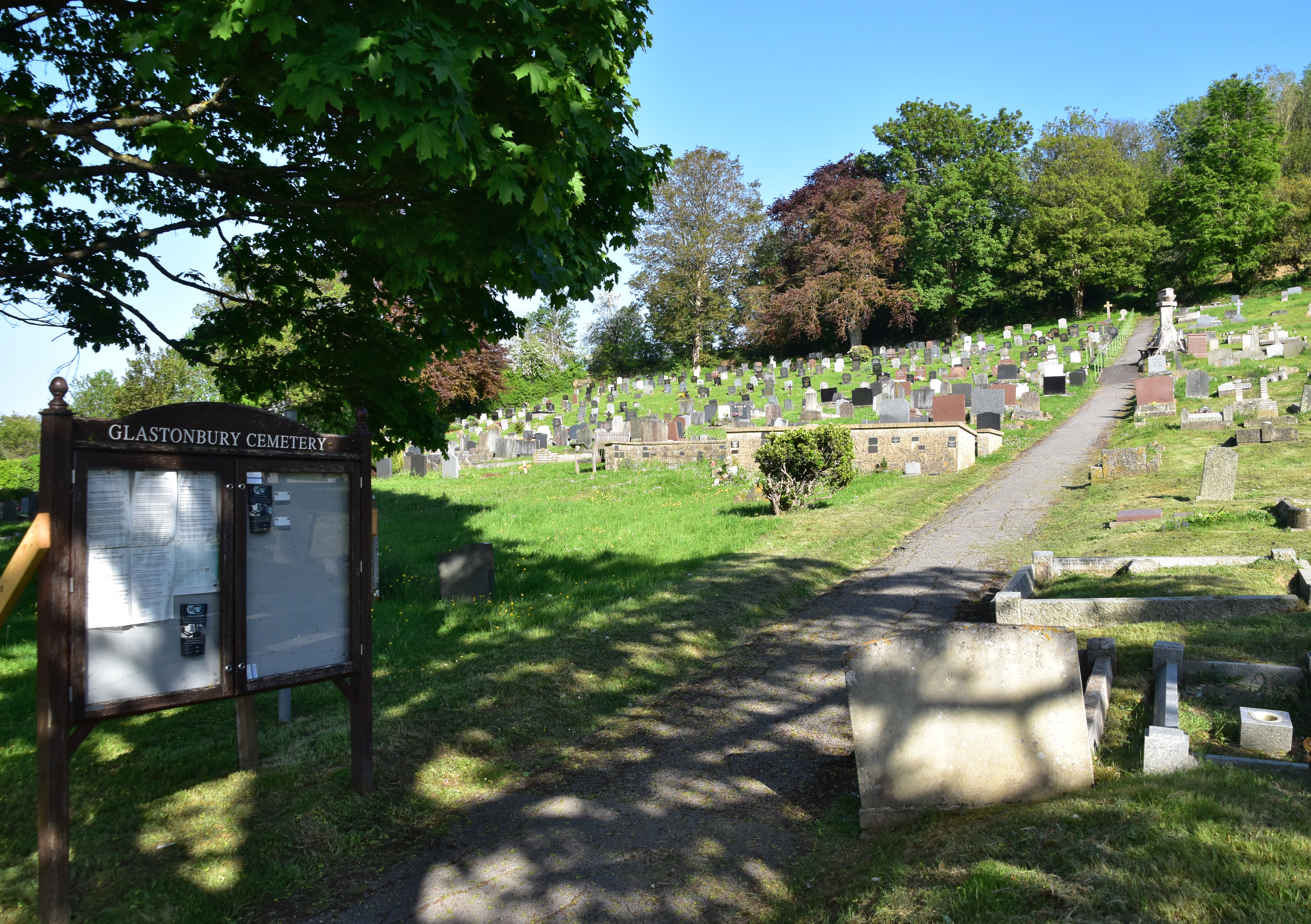
- Interactive map of Glastonbury Cemetery

Details
- Established: 1854–55
- Location: Glastonbury
- Country: UK
- Coordinates: 51.1558°N 2.7128°W
- Type: Cemetery
- Owned by: Glastonbury Town Council

Glastonbury Cemetery is a cemetery in Glastonbury, Somerset, England. It was established in 1854–55 and is maintained by Glastonbury Town Council.

The cemetery lodge and its two mortuary chapels became Grade II listed buildings in 1977.

== History ==
=== Establishment of cemetery ===
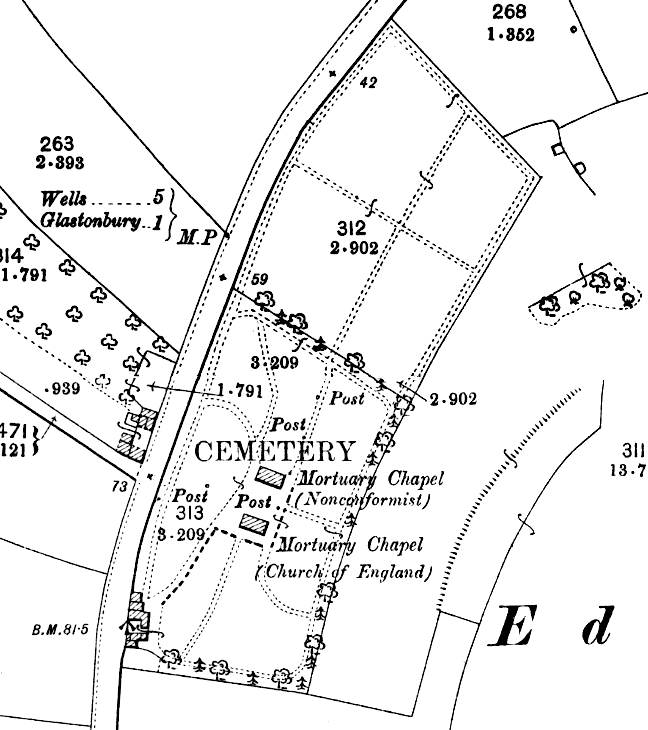
Glastonbury Cemetery depicted on an Ordnance Survey map from 1904.

Glastonbury Cemetery was established at a time when the burial space in the churchyards of St John's and St Benedict's were reaching full capacity. Furthermore, new burial space was considered essential for the town as the population, including in the surrounding villages, was expected in increase in the future. A vestry meeting in October 1853 resolved to establish a cemetery and saw the formation of the Glastonbury Burial Board. A number of sites were considered by the Board, including the fields to the north of St John's, Fisher's Hill, Wearyall Hill and Edmund Hill.

Edmund Hill, which was the Burial Board's favoured site, was subsequently chosen at a vestry meeting on 3 August 1854, although there was some regret that a suitable site closer to the town could not have been found. The same meeting saw the estimated costs for purchasing the land, constructing the cemetery, its chapels and lodge, passed. The site was then inspected and formally approved by the government during the following month. The plans for the cemetery's lodge, entrance gateway and two mortuary chapels (one for the Church of England and one for nonconformists) were drawn up by the architect Charles Edmund Giles of Taunton.

Construction of the cemetery commenced in late 1854 and was completed in 1855. On 5 October 1854, tenders were sought by the Burial Board for the "erection of two chapels and an entrance gateway in the new burial ground". The Board then invited tenders for "road-making, draining and other works" on 16 November 1854, followed by the "erection of a lodge and gateway" on 18 January 1855.

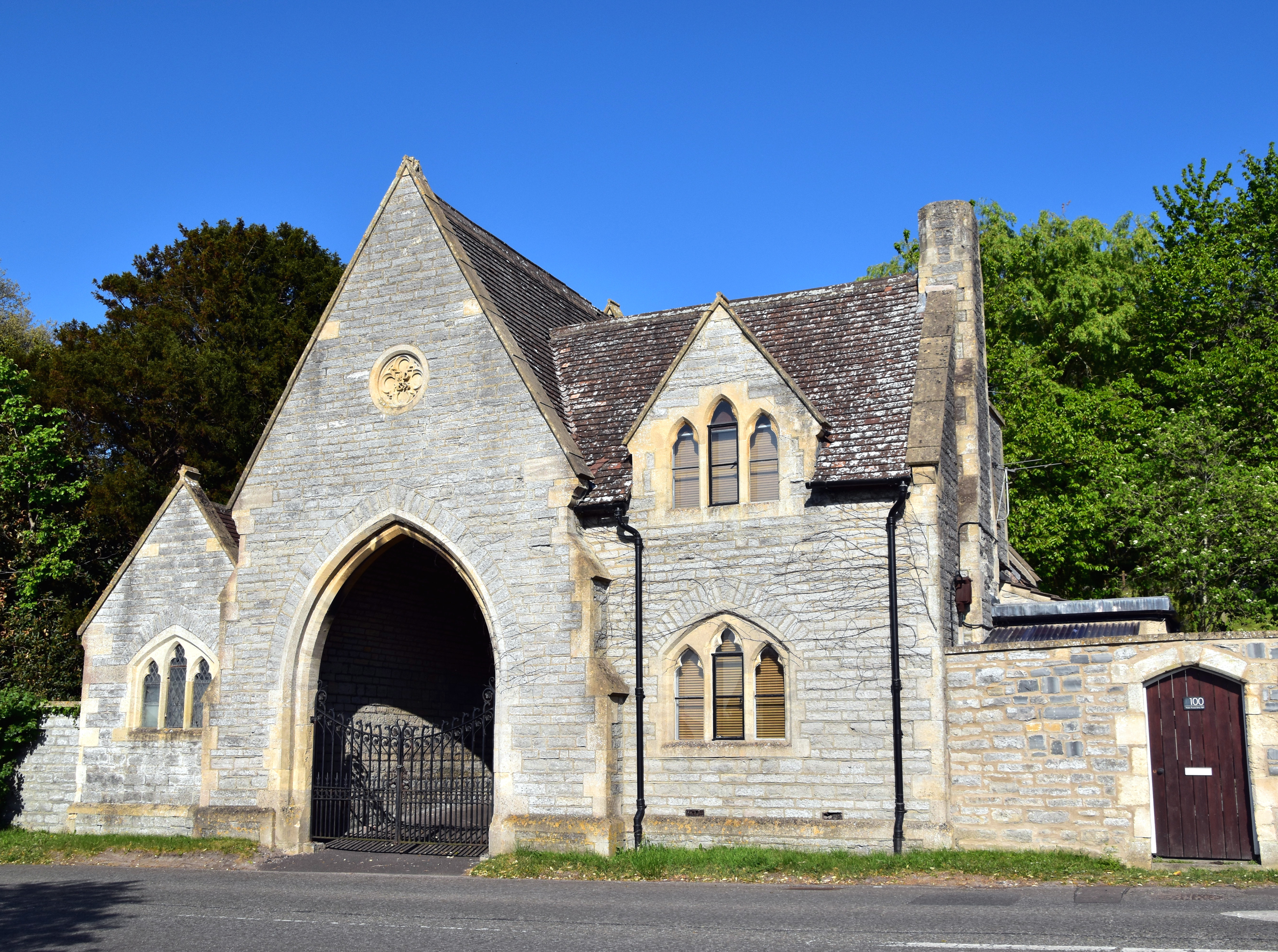
The cemetery's lodge and entrance gateway of 1855.

The first burial took place at the cemetery on 2 April 1855. The Bishop of Bath and Wells, Robert Eden, 3rd Baron Auckland, consecrated the Church of England section of the cemetery on 8 August 1856.

=== Extensions ===
By the end of the 19th century, the consecrated section of the cemetery was virtually full and new burials had to be made "in odd corners, and in parts of the footpath". It was reported in March 1900 that there were 26 consecrated spaces and 203 unconsecrated spaces remaining. A vestry meeting held in September 1899 decided to proceed with plans to enlarge the cemetery by purchasing approximately three acres of adjoining land on the north side. The purchase of the land cost £500 and a further £450 was spent on fencing, planting and laying out the ground.

The work was carried out in 1901–02, after the Burial Board invited tenders for "draining, path-making, and other works" on 23 October 1901. The Church of England section of the extension was consecrated on 9 May 1902. The Assistant Bishop of Bath and Wells, Bishop Stirling, performed the consecration on behalf of the Bishop of Bath and Wells, George Kennion, who was unable to attend due to illness.

The cemetery received another extension in 1999, when the Glastonbury and Sharpham Burial Joint Committee acquired additional land above the existing site from Mendip District Council. The extension provided the cemetery with further plot space for an additional 50 years, and has included a section used for green burials since 2005, the Edmund Hill Green Burial Site.

== Mortuary chapels ==
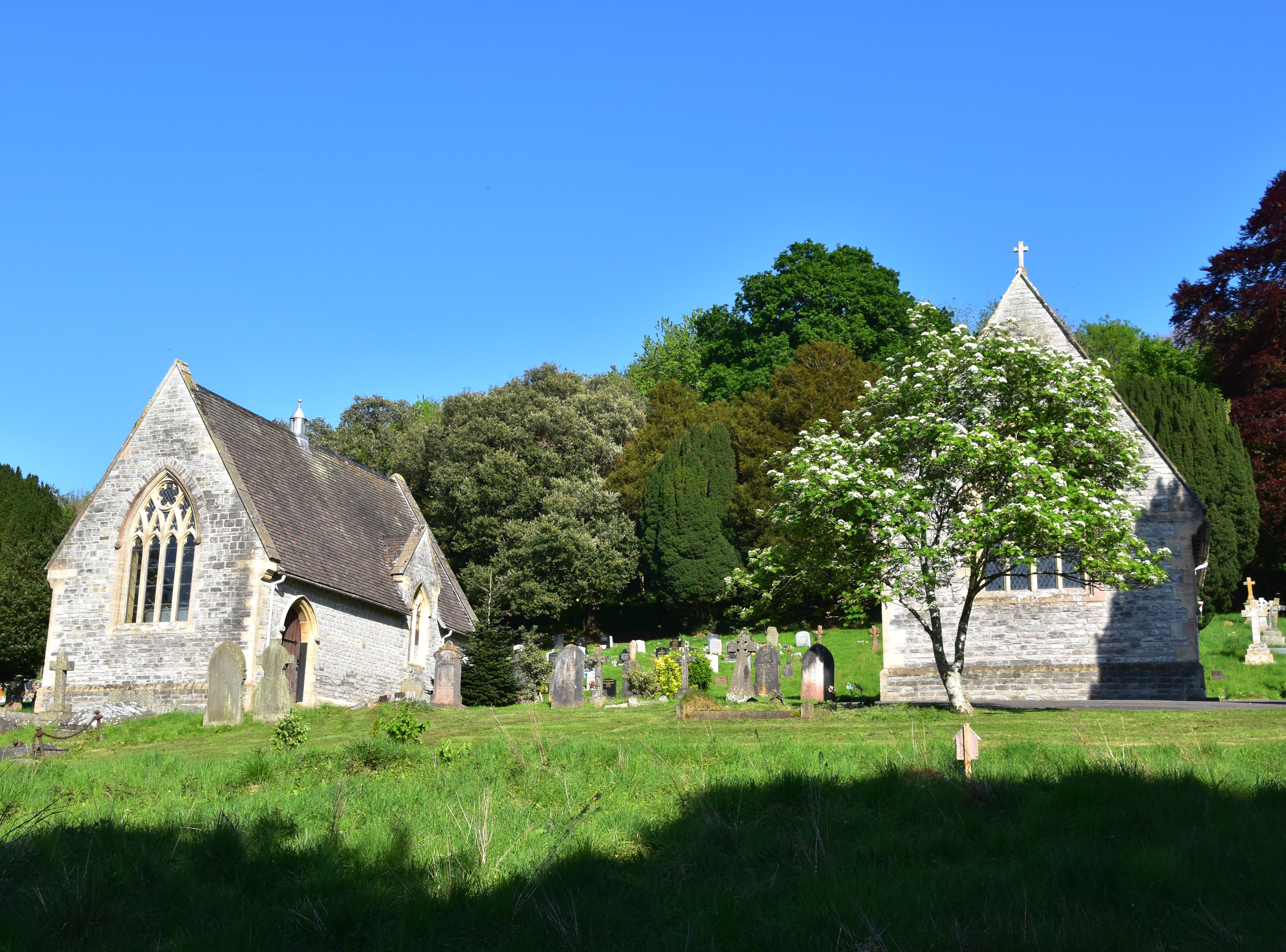
The cemetery's two mortuary chapels.

The cemetery's two mortuary chapels fell into disuse in the mid-20th century and were under threat of demolition in February 1977, when Glastonbury Town Council voted to demolish rather than repair them. By this time, the Church of England chapel saw infrequent use only and the nonconformist chapel was used as a store. The estimated repair costs were deemed prohibitive and it was feared the buildings would become a "danger to the public".

In March 1977, following pressure from Glastonbury's mayor and councillor Hugh Barker and the Council for the Protection of Rural England, Mendip District Council placed a preservation order on them, thereby halting demolition for six months while an application was made for their potential designation as listed buildings. Both of the chapels, along with the cemetery lodge, became Grade II listed buildings on 2 August 1977.

Despite the new protective status, Glastonbury and Sharpham Burial Joint Committee sought listed building consent from the District Council and a faculty from the Diocese of Bath and Wells for the demolition of both chapels. The plans were met with both local opposition and from organisations such as the Council for the Protection of Rural England, the Ancient Monuments Society and the Victorian Society. The District Council rejected the plans in September 1977, concluding it would "remove important visual elements from the cemetery to the serious detriment of its social, artistic and architectural character and interest of its landscape". In February 1986, the District Council once again refused an application to demolish them.

Between November 1990 and January 1992, repairs to the Church of England chapel were carried out by builder Rowley Bisgrove of Baltonsborough at a cost of £21,500. In February 1993, Glastonbury Town Council expressed their desire to demolish the nonconformist chapel, which was now in a "dangerous state", but the Burial Joint Committee's application for this was refused by the District Council in June 1993. Repair work was then authorised in September 1993, after the committee received a £10,000 grant from the District Council and a loan of £28,000 from the Town Council. The £41,000 project was carried out in 1994.

== Notable burials ==
- Dion Fortune, British occultist, ceremonial magician, novelist and author, 1946
