= Middleton Cemetery =

Cemetery in Greater Manchester, England

Middleton Cemetery and Crematorium
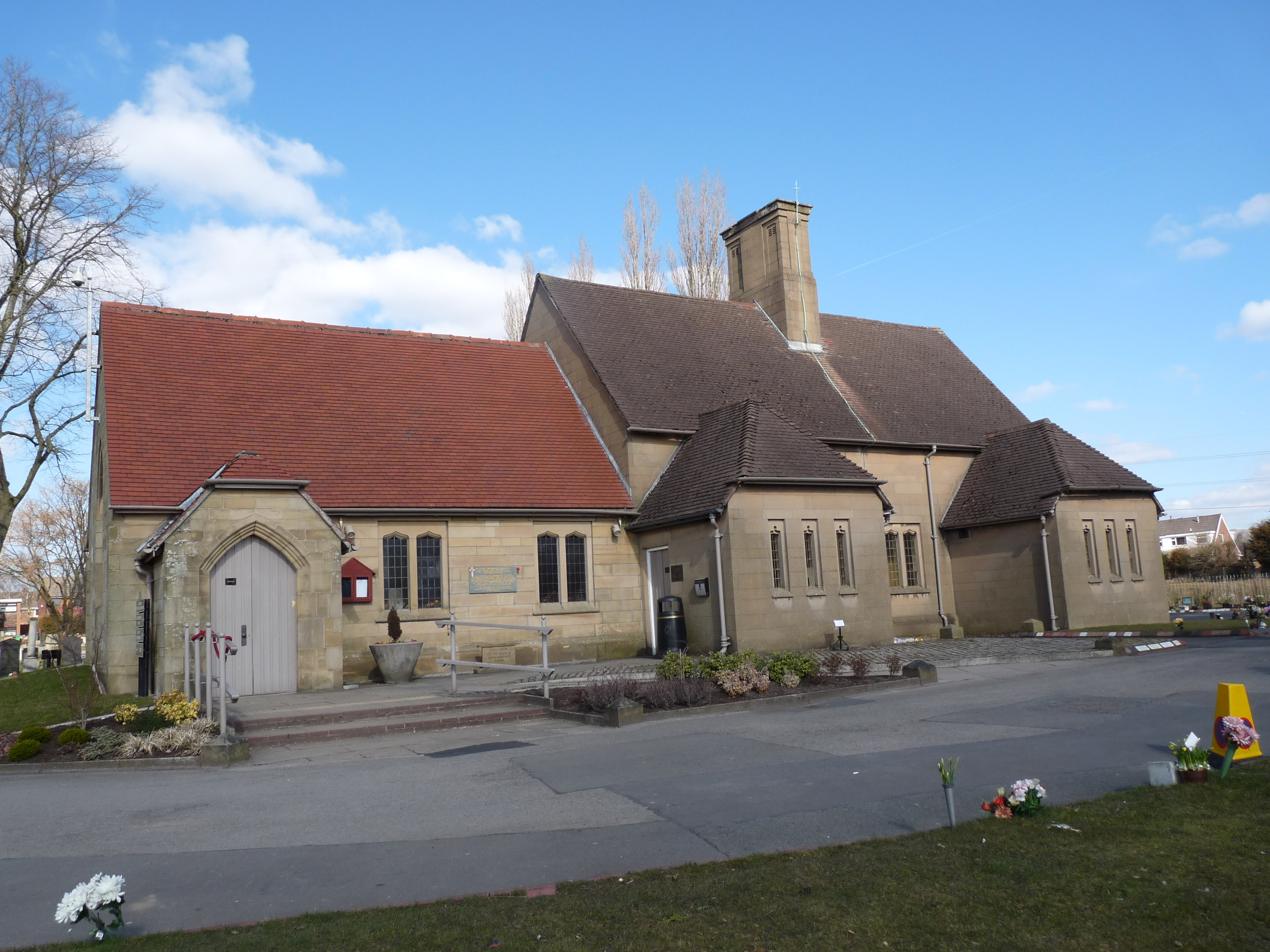
- Picture of the chapel at Middleton Cemetery and Crematorium
- Interactive map of Middleton Cemetery and Crematorium

Details
- Established: 1912
- Location: Middleton, Greater Manchester, United Kingdom
- Country: United Kingdom
- Coordinates: 53.5587573°N 2.1796054°W
- Type: Public
- Owned by: Rochdale Borough Council
- Find a Grave: Middleton Cemetery and Crematorium

Middleton Cemetery and Crematorium is a cemetery in Boarshaw Road, Middleton, Greater Manchester, England.

The cemetery was established in 1912 and is owned and maintained by Rochdale Metropolitan Borough Council. Facilities on the grounds include a crematorium, chapel, toilets, a memorial garden and a book of remembrance room.

== Interments ==
- Joel Halliwell (1881–1958), recipient of the Victoria Cross in World War I
- Lee Rigby (1987–2013), British Army Fusilier, killed by Islamic extremists in London, May 2013.
- 24 graves of military personnel maintained by the Commonwealth War Graves Commission, 6 from World War I, 18 from World War II.
