= Grace Academy =

Grace Academy may refer to:

- Ark Evelyn Grace Academy, an English Academy secondary school in Brixton, London
- Grace Academy (Darlaston), an English Academy secondary school in Darlaston
- Grace Academy (Coventry), an English Academy secondary school in Coventry
- Grace Academy (Solihull), an English Academy secondary school in Solihull
