= Jülich radio transmitter =

Coordinates: 50°56′40″N 6°21′45″E

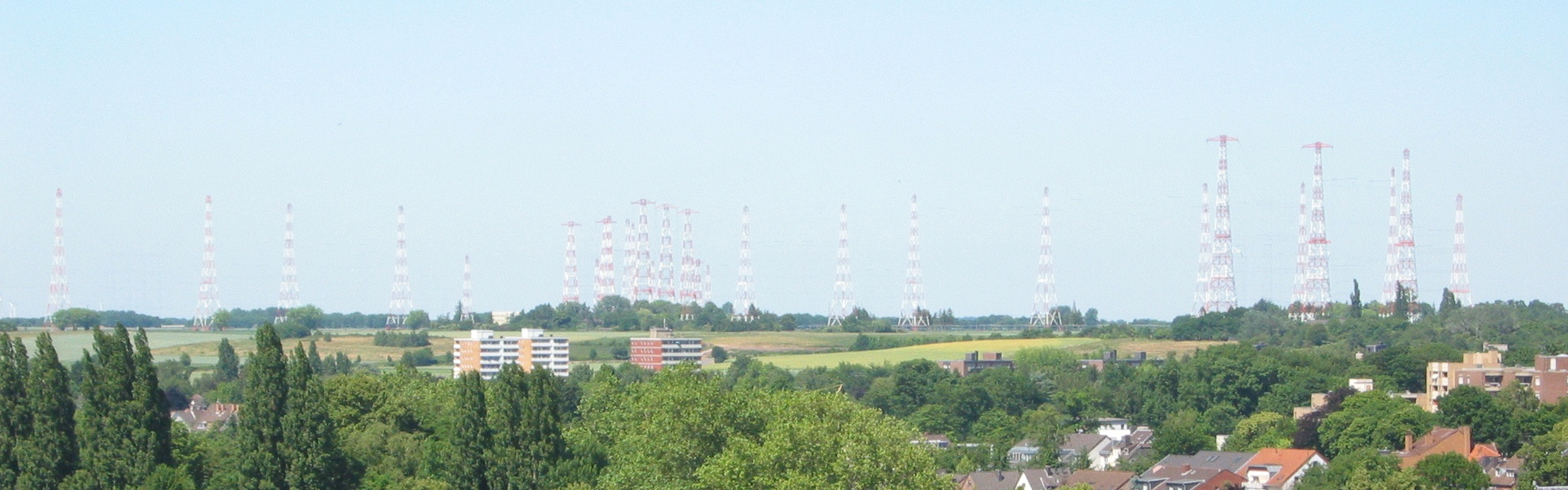
Overview

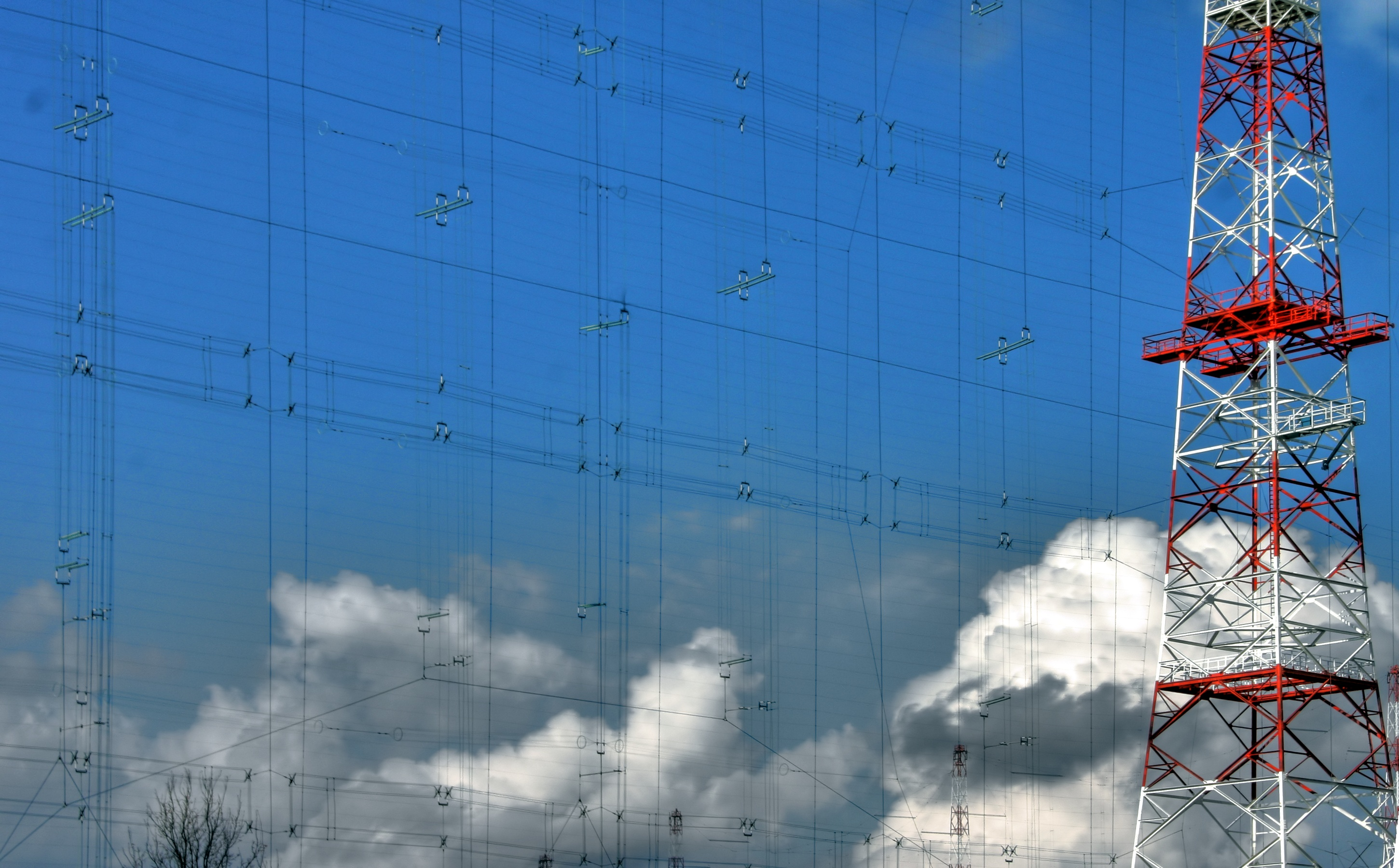
One of the dipole arrays

The Jülich shortwave transmitter, operated by Deutsche Telekom / T-Systems, was a part of the shortwave broadcasting facility at Jülich, Germany.

In 1956 WDR broadcaster established the first shortwave transmitter near Mersch, and in subsequent years this site was expanded. On 1 September 1961 this site was handed over to the Deutsche Bundespost (German Federal Post) to establish the German foreign broadcasting service, "Deutsche Welle". In time 10 transmitters of 100 kilowatts were installed. These were transmitting antennas with enormous dipole arrays between free-standing steel framework towers which were installed. Today these transmitters are rented predominantly to non-German broadcasting organisations. In the 1990s a mediumwave transmitter was installed on the site, using a long wire antenna which is spun at a tower on the transmitter site. It was intended to be used for transmission of the programmes of "Radio Viva" on 702 kHz, but it never went into regular service for this broadcaster. Since 6 December 2004, the mediumwave transmitter has been used to broadcast the programme of the German commercial broadcaster "TruckRadio" on 702 kHz.

In 2006, the British multi-millionaire Bob Edmiston from West Bromwich, acquired the entire transmitter. The car dealer and founder of the Christian missionary vision is regarded as creationist and had, amongst other things, bought a radio transmitter in Darwin, Australia 6 years ago.

In January 2008 the broadcasting facility was sold by T-Systems to the religious broadcaster CVC / Christian Vision.

When the broadcasting had been discontinued a recreation area with camping and hotels was to be built there.

Meanwhile, all antennas have been removed.
