= June Green (swimmer) =

British swimmer

Personal information
- Born: 18 January 1959 (age 67)

Sport
- Sport: Swimming

June Green (born 18 January 1959) is a female British former swimmer. Green competed in two events at the 1972 Summer Olympics.

== Early life ==
She lived at 144 Curtin Drive, Moxley, West Midlands, in the 1960s. In 1969 she swam with Heath Town Swimming Club, later swimming with Bilston Swimming Club.

She attended King's Hill Secondary Modern School, Darlaston, which became part of Darlaston Comprehensive School in 1972.

== Career ==
In the 1972 Summer Olympics, in Germany, she was the lowest age British competitor in any Olympics.

She represented England in the 200, 400 and 800 metres freestyle events, at the 1974 British Commonwealth Games in Christchurch, New Zealand. She won the ASA National Championship title in 1972 and 1973 over 400 metres freestyle and the 1971, 1972 and 1973 800 metres freestyle title.
