= Cossins =

Cossins is a surname. Notable people with the surname include:

- James Cossins (1933–1997), English actor
- Jethro Cossins (1830–1917), British architect
- John Cossins (1697–1743), English cartographer
- Tim Cossins (born 1970), American baseball coach

== See also ==
- Cosine
