= List of schools in the Metropolitan Borough of Solihull =

This is a list of schools in the Metropolitan Borough of Solihull, West Midlands, England.

== State-funded schools ==
=== Primary schools ===
- Balsall Common Primary School, Balsall Common
- Bentley Heath CE Primary School, Bentley Heath
- Berkswell CE Primary School, Berkswell
- Bishop Wilson CE Primary School, Chelmsley Wood
- Burman Infant School, Shirley
- Castle Bromwich Infant School, Castle Bromwich
- Castle Bromwich Junior School, Castle Bromwich
- Cheswick Green Primary School, Cheswick Green
- Coleshill Heath School, Chelmsley Wood
- Coppice Academy, Solihull
- Cranmore Infant School, Shirley
- Damson Wood Infant School, Solihull
- Dickens Heath Community Primary School, Dickens Heath
- Dorridge Primary School, Dorridge
- Fordbridge Community Primary School, Chelmsley Wood
- George Fentham Endowed School, Hampton in Arden
- Greswold Primary School, Solihull
- Haslucks Green School, Shirley
- Hockley Heath Academy, Hockley Heath
- Kineton Green Primary School, Olton
- Kingshurst Primary School, Kingshurst
- Knowle CE Primary Academy, Knowle
- Lady Katherine Leveson CE Primary School, Temple Balsall
- Marston Green Infant Academy, Marston Green
- Marston Green Junior School, Marston Green
- Meriden CE Primary School, Meriden
- Mill Lodge Primary School, Shirley
- Monkspath Junior & Infant School, Shirley
- Oak Cottage Primary School, Solihull
- Olton Primary School, Olton
- Our Lady of Compassion RC Primary School, Solihull
- Our Lady of the Wayside RC Primary School, Shirley
- Peterbrook Primary School, Shirley
- St Alphege CE Infant School, Solihull
- St Alphege CE Junior School, Solihull
- St Andrew's RC Primary School, Solihull
- St Anne's RC Primary School, Chelmsley Wood
- St Anthony's RC Primary School, Kingshurst
- St Augustine's RC Primary school, Solihull
- St George & St Teresa RC Primary School, Bentley Heath
- St John the Baptist RC Primary School, Chelmsley Wood
- St Margaret's CE Primary School, Olton
- St Mary & St Margaret's CE Primary School, Castle Bromwich
- St Patrick's CE Primary Academy, Earlswood
- Sharmans Cross Junior School, Solihull
- Shirley Heath Junior School, Shirley
- Smith's Wood Primary Academy, Smith's Wood
- Streetsbrook Infant Academy, Shirley
- Tidbury Green School, Tidbury Green
- Tudor Grange Primary Academy Langley, Olton
- Tudor Grange Primary Academy St James, Shirley
- Tudor Grange Primary Academy Yew Tree, Solihull
- Ulverley School, Solihull
- Valley Primary, Solihull
- Widney Junior School, Solihull
- Windy Arbor Primary School, Chelmsley Wood
- Woodlands Infant School, Shirley
- Yorkswood Primary School, Kingshurst

=== Secondary schools ===
- Alderbrook School, Solihull
- Arden Academy, Knowle
- Grace Academy, Chelmsley Wood
- Heart of England School, Balsall Common
- John Henry Newman Catholic College, Chelmsley Wood
- Langley School, Olton
- Light Hall School, Shirley
- Lode Heath School, Solihull
- Lyndon School, Solihull
- Park Hall Academy, Castle Bromwich
- St Peter's Catholic School, Solihull
- Smith's Wood Academy, Smith's Wood
- Tudor Grange Academy, Kingshurst
- Tudor Grange Academy, Solihull
- WMG Academy for Young Engineers, Chelmsley Wood

=== Special and alternative schools ===
- Castlewood School, Castle Bromwich
- Daylesford Academy, Smith's Wood
- Forest Oak School, Smith's Wood
- Hazel Oak School, Shirley
- The Heights Academy, Solihull
- Merstone School, Smith's Wood
- Reynald's Cross School, Olton
- Solihull Alternative Provision Academy, Shirley
- Springfield House Community Special School, Knowle*
- Triple Crown Centre, Solihull

*This school is located in Solihull, but is for pupils from Birmingham.

=== Further education ===
- Solihull Sixth Form College
- Solihull College

== Independent schools ==
=== Primary and preparatory schools ===
- Eversfield Preparatory School, Solihull
- Ruckleigh School, Solihull

=== Senior and all-through schools ===
- Kingswood School, Shirley
- Solihull School, Solihull

=== Special and alternative schools ===
- The Island Project School, Meriden
- Trident Alternative Provision, Solihull
