= Darlaston Urban District =

Former local government area in the UK

Coordinates: 52.570°N 2.041°W

Darlaston Urban District was a local authority which existed within the West Midlands conurbation, England, from 1894 until 1966. It was centred on the township of Darlaston in the Black Country, and also incorporated the villages of Bentley and Moxley.

The authority ceased to exist in 1966 when, along with the majority of the neighbouring Willenhall Urban District and parts of the Wednesbury Urban District, it became part of Walsall County Borough, later Metropolitan Borough of Walsall.
