= Robert Edmiston =

English businessman, bibliophile, and philanthropist (born 1946)

The Right Honourable The Lord Edmiston
- Born: Robert Norman Edmiston; 6 October 1946 (age 80)
- Occupation: Motor trade entrepreneur
- Known for: Property owner

Member of the House of Lords
- Lord Temporal
- Life peerage 14 January 2011 – 22 July 2015

Robert Norman Edmiston, Baron Edmiston (born 6 October 1946) is a British billionaire businessman and motor trade entrepreneur based in the West Midlands, who has established a number of religious and educational charities, including Christian Vision.

According to the Sunday Times Rich List in 2021, Edmiston is worth £897 million.

In of February 2026, Robert Edmiston was listed on The Sunday Times tax list with an estimated £16 Million.

== Business activities ==
Edmiston became a millionaire through his companies IM Group, a car importer, and IM Properties. In 1974 he was finance director at sports car manufacturer Jensen Motors, and used a £6,000 redundancy payout when the company went bankrupt to set up International Motors, which acquired the UK franchise for Subaru and Isuzu cars. He later branched out into property and vehicle finance. IM Group is now managed by his son, Andrew Edmiston.

== Charitable activities ==
Edmiston is an Evangelical Christian and has made large donations to a large evangelical charity, Christian Vision, which he established in 1988, based in Solihull, West Midlands.

== Grace Academies ==
Through two other charities, Edmiston is the sponsor of three secondary schools within the English academy programme (Grace Academy, Coventry, Grace Academy, Solihull, and Grace Academy, Darlaston). On 25 August 2011, both were removed as charities. He is chair of the governors for all three academies. Edminston paid £2m to sponsor each academy.

The academies follow a Christian ethos. On 20 August 2013, the academies were among schools named by The Independent newspaper and the British Humanist Association as adopting policies similar in wording to the repealed anti-gay legislation Section 28.

In 2007, it was announced that Grace Academy, Solihull had awarded contracts worth £281,000 over 2 years to the IM Group for payroll and other "management services" without going to competitive tender. The school also donated £53,000 over a 2-year period to Christian Vision. In response, Edmiston claimed that the school had no capability to pay wages and that he had transferred a member of Christian Vision to manage the project at cost price. The DfES refused to say why it had waived its "strict" rules requiring 3 competitive tenders but Sarah Teather, the then Liberal Democrats education spokesperson, said that the absence of tendering was worrying and "Lack of proper regulation will leave loopholes for the unscrupulous."

By 2014, the 3 schools had paid "more than £1m" to companies owned by Edmiston, academy trustees or their relatives. A company belonging to Edmiston's brother-in-law, Gary Spicer received over £367k for consultancy work over 6 years whilst the charities established by Edmiston received over £170k. In response, the academy's director of corporate development said the companies had financed the academy's development and provided office space. The payments – including for consultancy fees, IT advice and legal services – led to fears that the Department of Education was not monitoring the schools' accounts closely enough. Shadow Schools Minister Kevin Brennan said it was "deeply concerning that so much taxpayer money is ending up in the pockets of academy chain directors and trustees" and that the Government urgently needed to prioritise protection of public money over the rate of expansion.

== Politics ==
Edmiston has also been a backer of the Conservative Party, which he supported with a £2 million loan, later converted into a donation. He was one of the businessmen behind the Midlands Industrial Council, a Conservative Party political campaigning organization.

In 2005, The Times reported that he was on a list of proposed new working peers; however, his nomination was overtaken by the "Cash for Peerages" scandal and was blocked by the House of Lords Appointments Commission. The Inland Revenue also opposed his appointment as a peer, because of a tax dispute with IM Group.

On 19 November 2010, it was announced that Edmiston was to be created a Life Peer. He sat as a Conservative in the House of Lords, with the title (created 14 January 2011) Baron Edmiston, of Lapworth in the County of Warwickshire. In the House of Lords debate on gay marriage on 3 June 2013, Lord Edmiston opposed gay marriage on the grounds that it could lead to other forms of marriage. He said: "If there is no possibility of genetic offspring or indeed no requirement for consummation, why should not close relatives get married?" [Hansard].

On 22 July 2015, Edmiston retired from the House of Lords. He "semi-retired" to Portugal in 2016.

== Arms ==
Coat of arms of Robert Edmiston
Coronet Coronet of a Baron Crest A Demi-Lion guardant Or, grasping in the dexter fore-claw a rolled Scroll Argent, and in the sinister a Trumpet Gules. Escutcheon Argent, a Pall Sable, between three Blades of Grass wavy in pale, each with two stipules Vert. Supporters Dexter: a Lion Or. Sinister: a Lamb Argent, vulned in the side Gules. Motto DILIGENCE CHARITY INTEGRITY

Orders of precedence in the United Kingdom
Preceded by The Lord Ahmad of Wimbledon	Gentlemen; Baron Edmiston	Followed by The Lord Framlingham
