= Sammy Weston =

English footballer from the 1890s

Personal information
- Full name: Samuel Rennie Weston
- Date of birth: 19 October 1870
- Place of birth: Darlaston, England
- Date of death: 9 February 1960 (aged 89)
- Place of death: Royal Leamington Spa, England
- Position: Right winger

Senior career*
Years	Team	Apps	(Gls)
1892-1896,	Rudge F.C		
1896-1896	Singers F.C	10	(3)
1896-1897	Rudge F.C		
1897-1898	Progress		
1898-1899	Darlaston Town F.C		
- * Club domestic league appearances and goals

Samuel Rennie Weston (19 October 1870 - 9 February 1960) was an English professional football player who played as a right-winger

== Career ==
Born in Darlaston, Sammy played for Singers F.C (Coventry City FC), Rudge FC, Progress & Darlaston Town F.C

=== Singers F.C ===
Sammy signed for Singers on 25 January 1896, Signing from Rudge since he started his career in 1892. He made his Singers debut on 08/02/1896 (in the Birmingham League) and scored both goals in their 2-0 win over Stafford Rangers playing at outside right (No.7). He only played the second half of the one season for Singers first team making just 10 appearances and scoring three times. His last game for Singers was another Birmingham League game on 25 April 1896 in a 1-0 defeat at Stourbridge F.C

=== Aftermath ===
He moved (back) to Rudge-Whitworth for the 1896-97 season, then another local Coventry team Progress for 1897-98 and the last we hear of him is playing for Darlaston Town from 1898 before his retirement in January 1899.

=== Personal life ===
He married Amy Gough at Walsall in 1893. The couple had four children Philip, Harry, Olive & Dorothy.

He is the 3rd Great Grandfather of musician Callum Graham from Coventry

His son Philip was regarded as One of Coventry's best-known licensees & was also a former footballer for the club Walsall F.C as well as other teams. In his later years he was the licensee of The General Wolfe in Coventry.

He died 9 February 1960 at Breton Lodge Nursing Home.
