= Darlaston Town Hall =

Municipal building in Darlaston, West Midlands, England

Coordinates: 52.5686°N 2.0338°W

Darlaston Town Hall is a municipal building in Victoria Road in Darlaston, a town in the West Midlands of England. The building, which is currently leased to a charity which manages local community activities, is a locally listed building.

== History ==
Following significant population growth, largely associated with the status of Darlaston as a market town, a local board of health was established the area in 1869. In 1881, the local board of health decided to commission a town hall to commemorate the Golden Jubilee of Queen Victoria. The site they selected, on Pardoes Lane, was occupied by a disused workhouse.

The foundation stone for the new building was laid by the chairman of the local board, James Slater of Bescot Hall, on 21 June 1887. It was designed by Jethro Cossins in the Queen Anne style, built in brick with stone dressings at a cost of £5,500 and was officially opened on 31 October 1888. However, further money had to be raised to complete the work. The final stage of the complex, a public library, opened in September 1891.

The design involved a symmetrical main frontage of 13 bays facing onto Victoria Road, with the end sections of three bays each projected forward as pavilions. The central section of seven bays featured an elliptically headed doorway with voussoirs and a keystone flanked by pilasters supporting a parapet. The other bays on the ground floor were fenestrated by elliptically headed windows with voussoirs and keystones, while all the bays on the first floor were fenestrated by mullioned and transomed windows. At roof level, there was a central lantern with louvres and a finial. The end sections were fenestrated by mullioned and transomed windows with oculi in the gables above.

In 1895, the Local Board was succeeded by Darlaston Urban District Council, which used the town hall for its meetings. In 1966, the district became part of the County Borough of Walsall, which used the building to house its social services department, while also making the main hall available for community events. In 2012, a £500,000 restoration of the hall was proposed, but did not go ahead. In 2017, the council leased the building to a local charity, Darlaston All Active.

== The pipe organ ==
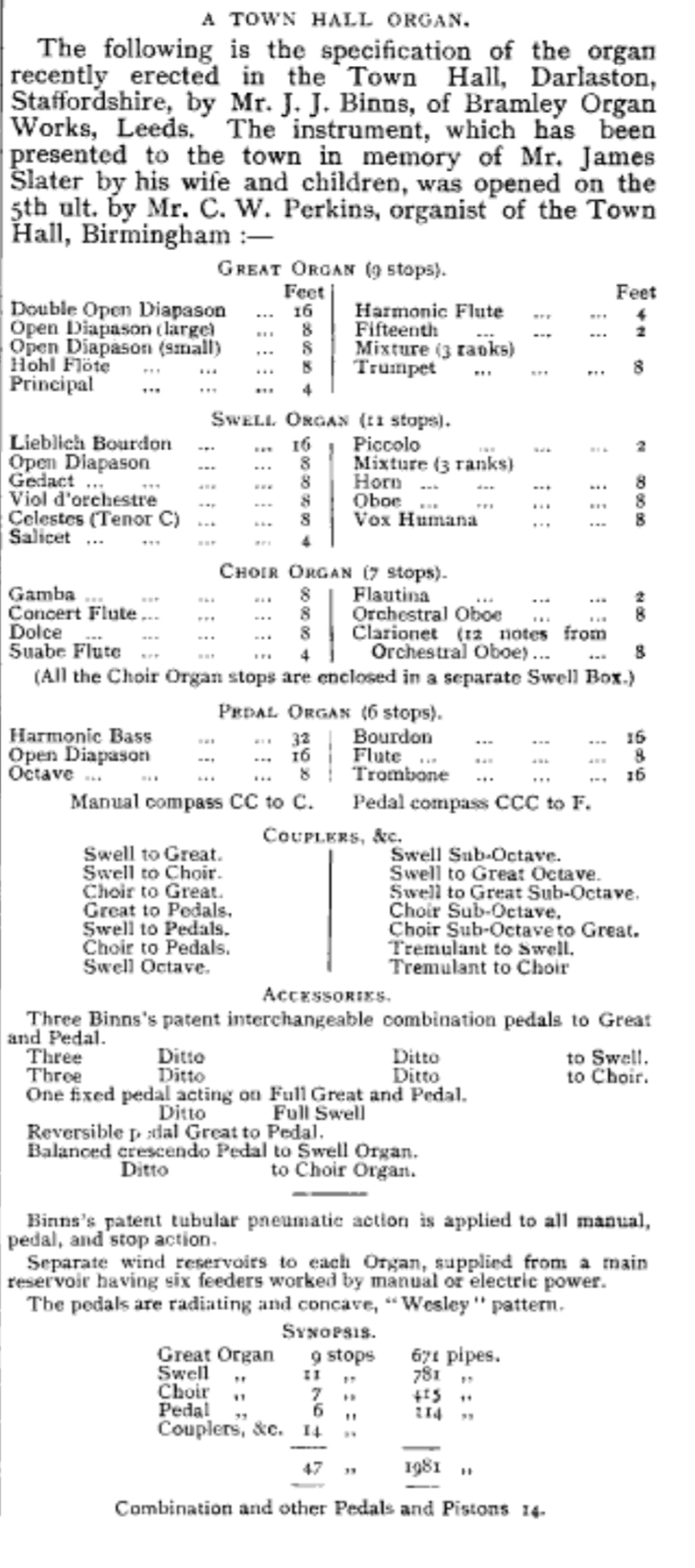
Description of the organ in The Musical Times (Dec. 1, 1903)

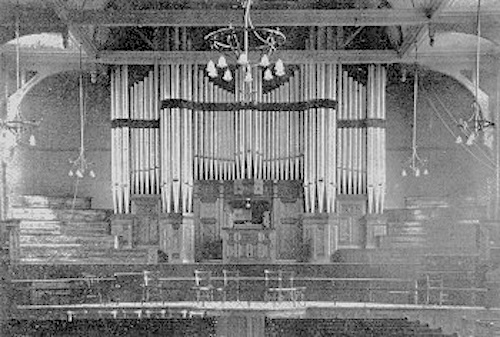
The pipe organ in Darlaston Town Hall (UK) of 1903 by J.J. Binns (Leeds)

By 1903 the public hall was adorned with a fine new pipe organ, a gift to the town from the widow of James Slater, an ex-chairman of the local board, in his memory. The instrument was built by the West Yorkshire firm of J. J. Binns and was fully reported in the Musical Times. The organ is still in use. In June 2018 the Darlaston Town Hall pipe organ was recognised of outstanding national importance by the British Institute of Organ Studies (BIOS) – the UK's amenity society for pipe organs – and is listed as Grade 1 in the UK Historic Organs Scheme for being: an unaltered example of a town hall organ of 1903 by J. J. Binns and from the firm’s finest period.
