= Ted Pheasant =

English footballer

Personal information
- Full name: Edward Pheasant
- Date of birth: 15 February 1875
- Place of birth: Darlaston, England
- Date of death: 17 July 1910 (aged 33)
- Place of death: Wolverhampton, England
- Position: Defender

Senior career*
Years	Team	Apps	(Gls)
	Wednesbury Excelsior	-	(-)
1895–1904	Wolverhampton Wanderers	159	(19)
1904–1910	West Bromwich Albion	140	(20)
1910	Leicester Fosse	0	(0)
- * Club domestic league appearances and goals

Edward Pheasant (15 February 1875 – 17 July 1910) was an English footballer, who played in the Football League for both Black Country clubs, Wolverhampton Wanderers and West Bromwich Albion.

== Career ==
Pheasant began his career at local non-league club Wednesbury Excelsior (which later became Wednesbury Old Athletic) before joining First Division Wolverhampton Wanderers in August 1895. He made his league debut on 19 September 1896 in a 3–4 loss at Derby, but had to wait until the 1898–99 season to become a first choice player.

He was an ever-present for two successive seasons during 1899–1901, amassing 168 games for the club over a nine-year stay. He then moved to neighbours West Bromwich Albion in November 1904 for a £500 transfer fee and in the same month made his debut against Manchester United in a Division Two match. He appeared in 152 games for Albion in all competitions, scoring 22 goals.

The defender joined Leicester Fosse in 1910 but never played a game for them. He died of peritonitis just two weeks after signing for the club, on 17 July 1910 aged 33. (An obituary in the West Bromwich & Oldbury Chronicle, dated Friday 22 July 1910, suggests that Ted Pheasant had recently signed for Darlaston after being released by WBA. His death came about following an incident in which he strained himself playing cricket. Peritonitis set in, but unfortunately an operation to remedy this proved to be unsuccessful.)
