= Darlaston railway station (1863–1887) =

Former railway station in England

Darlaston
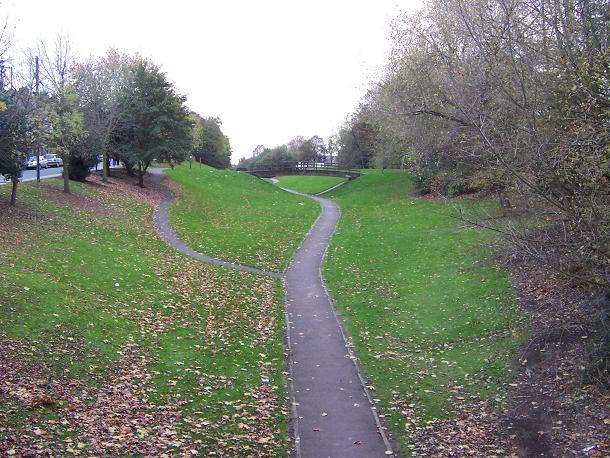
- The former railway line near the station at Darlaston

General information
- Location: Darlaston, Walsall; England
- Coordinates: 52.5665°N 2.0340°W
- Grid reference: SO977965

Other information
- Status: Disused

History
- Original company: London and North Western Railway
- Pre-grouping: London and North Western Railway

Key dates
- 1863: Opened
- 1887: Closed
Location

Darlaston railway station was a station built on the South Staffordshire Line in 1863. It served the town of Darlaston, and was located to the east of the town centre, on Walsall Road. It was one of two railway stations that served the town. The other, Darlaston James Bridge, was located on the Walsall to Wolverhampton Line and became known as Darlaston after the closure of this station.

== Closure ==
The station closed in 1887, and there is little evidence of its existence at the site, although the former trackbed is in use as a footpath.

Preceding station	Disused railways	Following station
Darlaston James Bridge	London and North Western Railway; Darlaston Loop	Wednesbury Town
