= Grace Academy, Coventry =

Grace Academy Coventry

Location
- Wigston Road; Coventry, West Midlands, CV2 2RH; England; 52.43817°N 1.44582°W

Information
- Type: Academy
- Religious affiliation: Christian
- Established: September 2008
- Founder: Robert Edmiston
- Local authority: Coventry City Council
- Department for Education URN: 135335 Tables
- Ofsted: Reports
- Principal: Natasha Whiles
- Gender: Mixed
- Age: 11 to 18
- Enrolment: 806
- Website: http://coventry.graceacademy.org.uk/

Grace Academy Coventry is a mixed secondary school located in Coventry, England. It was founded in 1968 as Woodway Park School and Community College, and became Grace Academy in 2008

== History ==
It was formerly Woodway Park School and Community College, and was converted into an academy on 31 August 2008. In February 2010 the school moved into new buildings.

The academy was operated by Grace Foundation, a registered charity founded by Bob Edmiston, entrepreneur and founder of the evangelical international charity Christian Vision; however in April 2019 the Grace Trust closed and the academy became a member of the larger Tove Learning Trust, lead school Sponne School, Towcester, Northamptonshire. According to its Annual Report and Financial Statements to August 2012, the Coventry school received annual government funding of £5,898,000.

On 20 August 2013 the school was among those named by The Independent and the British Humanist Association as adopting a policy similar in wording to the repealed anti-gay legislation Section 28. The academy is now fully in line with Coventry LA policies on sex and relationship education, which conform to recent government guidelines.

In October 2013, a letter from John Nash, Baron Nash showed that early access results were below the minimal standard with only 32% of pupils achieving 5 GCSEs at grades A*-C including English and mathematics – an 18% drop from 2012. An external education advisor criticised the quality of both teaching and pupil assessment.

In December 2019 the school was rated by Ofsted as requires improvement, the monitoring visit in February 2021 stated the school was making progress to becoming rated good. In January 2024 the school was rated good.

== See also ==
- Grace Academy, Darlaston
- Grace Academy, Solihull
- List of schools in Coventry
