= Darlaston Community Science College =

Location
- Herberts Park Road; Darlaston, Wednesbury, West Midlands, WS10 8QJ; England; 52.5692°N 2.0474°W

Information
- Type: Community Comprehensive school
- Local authority: Metropolitan Borough of Walsall
- Specialist: Technology
- Last Headteacher: Mr Stephen Casey
- Gender: Co-educational
- Age: 11 to 18
- Enrolment: 1,090
- Houses: (originally) Windsor, Stuart, Tudor, Hanover = (later) Apollo, Challenger, Discovery, Enterprise, Gemini, Mariner, Telstar, Voyager
- Opened: 1960s
- Closed: August 31st 2009
- Website: http://www.darlaston.walsall.sch.uk/

Darlaston Community Science College was a secondary school located in Darlaston, West Midlands, England.

The school had Specialist Science College status, and since the closure of Kings Hill School during the 1980s, was the only secondary school in the town.

It was founded in 1960, as a Grammar and Technical School, on the former premises of the Wednesbury County Commercial Secondary School (The Limes) in Wood Green Road, under the Headmastership of Mr W.C. Donithorn. It transferred to its present site in 1962, and adopted comprehensive status in 1965.

Education was provided for pupils aged 11 to 18 years, from Key Stage 3 through GCSE to A-Level. There were typically around 1,100 pupils on the roll, as well as 100 full-time teachers and a further 50 support staff including learning support assistants.

OFSTED inspections took place in 1997, 1999 and most recently in 2004. All of these inspections were successful. However in January 2008 the Express and Star newspaper reported the school had been placed in special measures

Towards its later years lessons started at 8.45am and finished at 2.40pm to allow for extra-curricular activities which are not suitable for normal lesson time. Lessons were an hour each with 5 lessons per day.

The school became the Grace Academy in September 2009, following approvals of plans to convert the school into an academy in October 2008.

The school's final head teacher was Mr Stephen Casey.

== Closure ==
Darlaston Community Science College closed at the end of the school year in July 2009 and re-opened in September 2009 as the Grace Academy, Darlaston. No longer being in special measures. The consultation process has attracted a lot of local criticism for being a rushed and hurried process. Grace Academy Solihull having taken five terms to implement and execute a transition procedure, Darlaston was given less than two. In a consultations meeting beforehand one governor resigned and left the meeting after the board of governors had been accused of failing the school.

== School Buildings ==
The school consisted of dated buildings, It has its own sixth form centre, Art department and cennete. It also has its own sports hall, swimming pool and technology Block.

== Notable former pupils ==
=== King's Hill Secondary Modern School ===
- June Green (swimmer), born 1959, competed in the 1972 Summer Olympics and 1974 Commonwealth Games
