= Bill Guttridge =

English footballer and manager

Personal information
- Full name: William Henry Guttridge
- Date of birth: 4 March 1931
- Place of birth: Darlaston, England
- Date of death: 6 April 2013 (aged 82)
- Place of death: Walsall, England
- Position: Left back

Youth career
- Metroshaft Works
- 1947–1951: Wolverhampton Wanderers

Senior career*
Years	Team	Apps	(Gls)
1951–1954	Wolverhampton Wanderers	6	(0)
1954–1962	Walsall	198	(0)
- Stourbridge
1962–1964	Macclesfield Town	72	(0)
Total		276	(0)

Managerial career
- Darlaston
- Macclesfield Town
- * Club domestic league appearances and goals

William Henry Guttridge (4 March 1931 – 6 April 2013) was an English professional football player and manager.

== Career ==
Guttridge played as a left back for amateur side Metroshaft Works before joining First Division club Wolverhampton Wanderers in 1947.

Nicknamed 'Chopper', mostly played only reserve team games for Wolves, but did make seven first team appearances during his seven-year stay at Molineux, including during their title-winning campaign of 1953–54. His competitive debut came on Christmas Day 1951 in a 3–3 draw at Aston Villa.

Unable to break into Wolves' first team the full-back moved to Midlands neighbours Walsall in November 1954, where he made over 200 appearances - often as captain - during an eight-year spell. A cartilage injury forced his playing retirement in 1962.

After retiring as a player, he worked as a youth coach at Walsall as well as managing Darlaston and Macclesfield Town.

He died on 6 April 2013, at the age of 82, at Walsall Manor Hospital after a long battle with Parkinson's disease.
