= Darlaston =

Town in West Midlands, England

Coordinates: 52.5708°N 2.0457°W

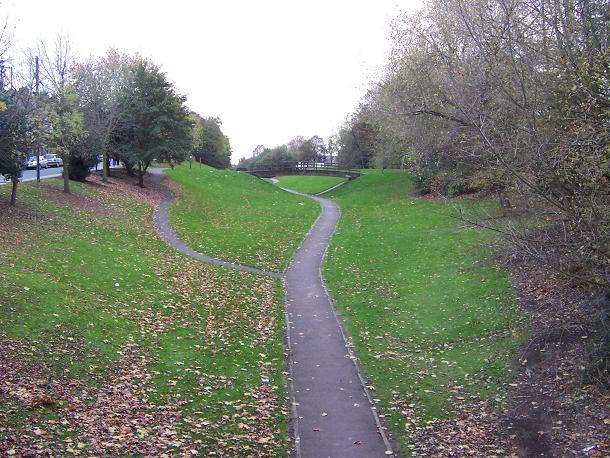
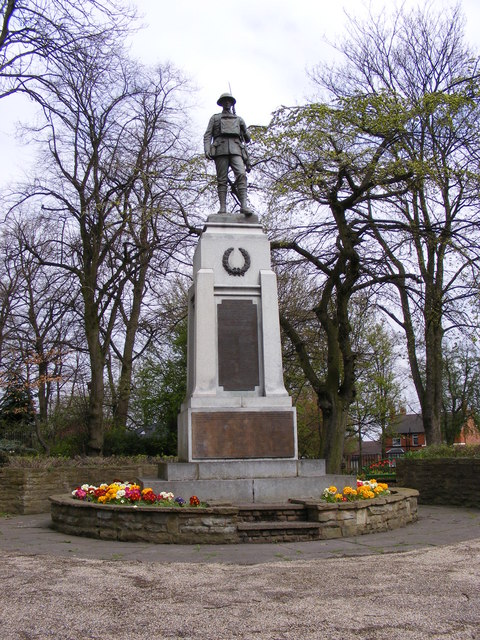
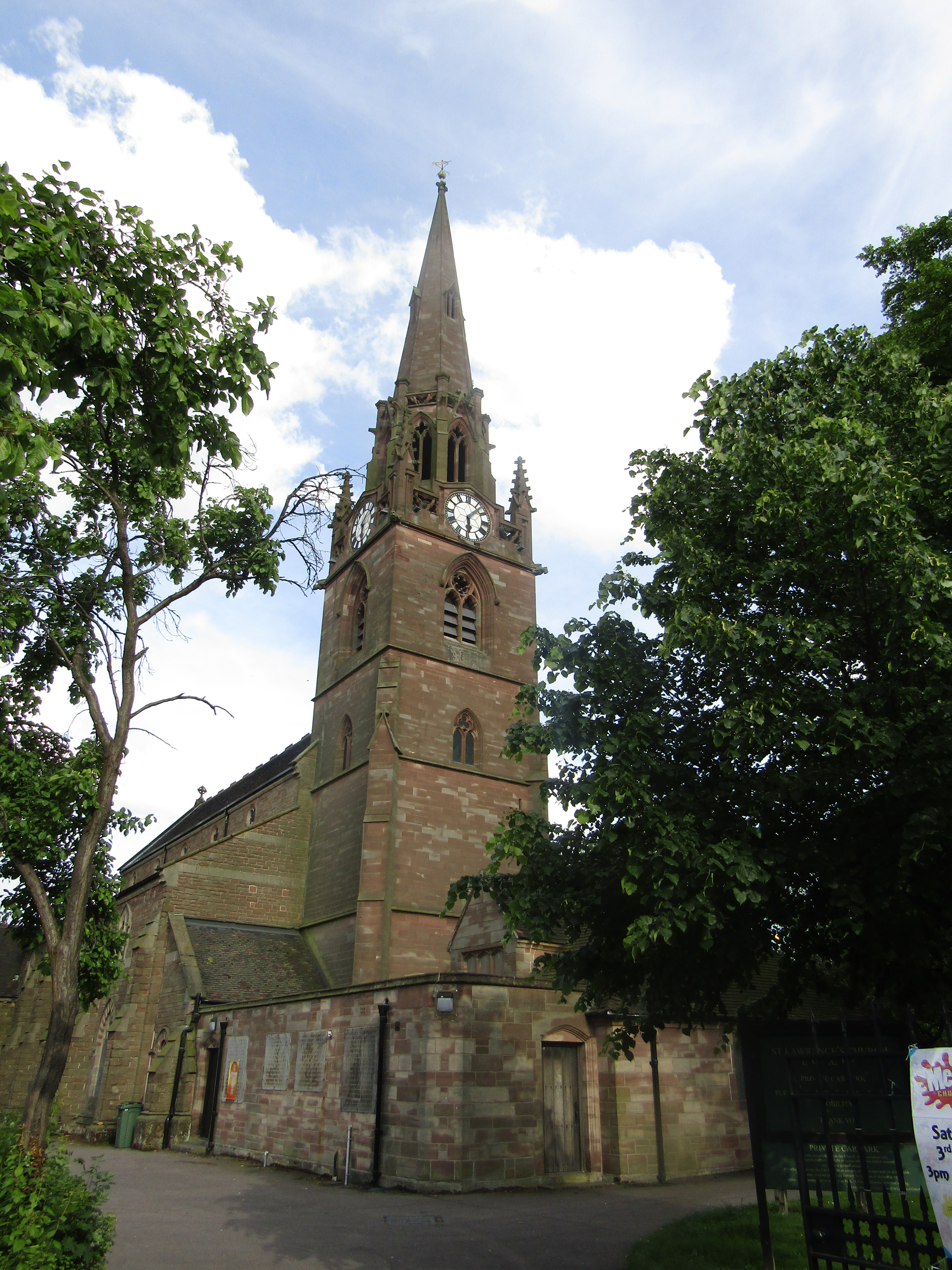
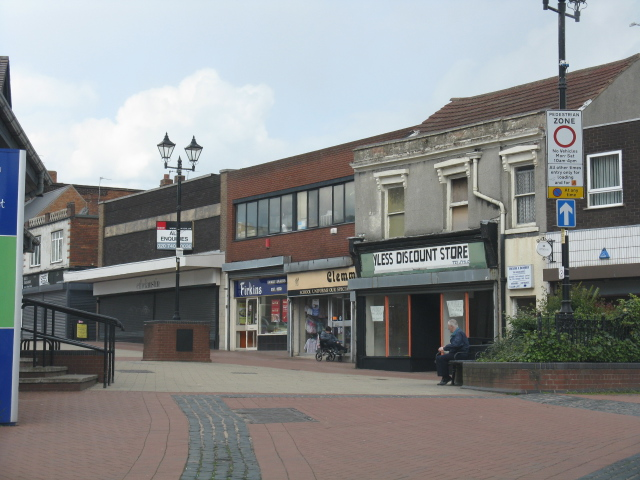
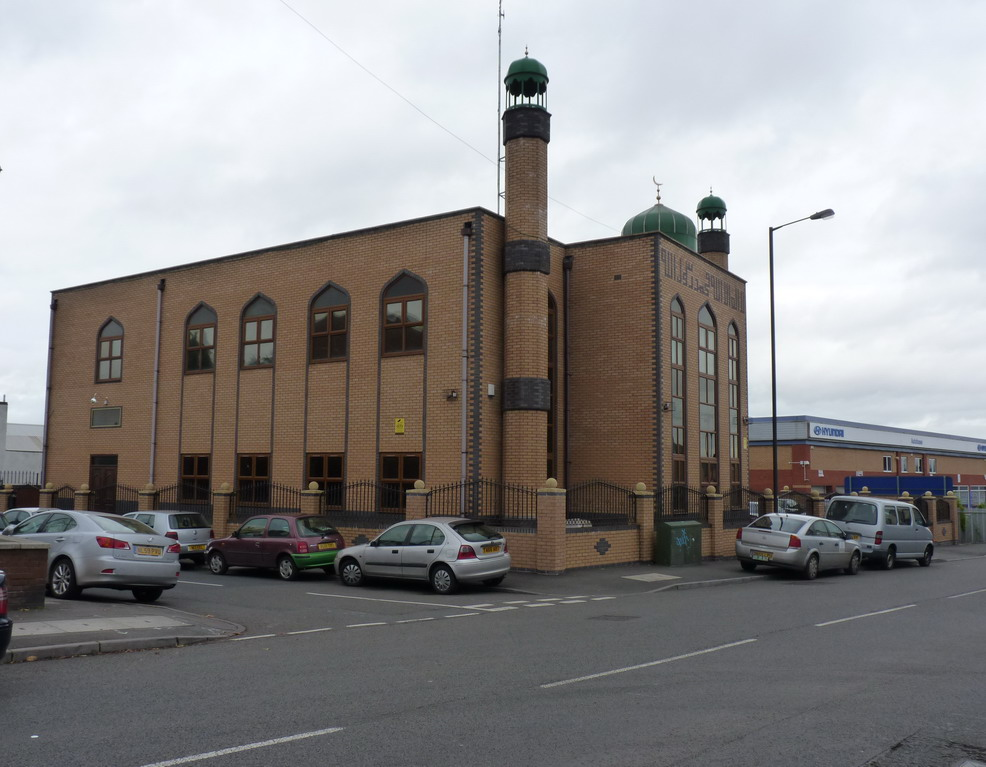
- Clockwise from top: Darlaston Loop Greenway, St Lawrence Church, Zia-e-Madinah Mosque, Town Centre & Cenotaph

- Location within the West Midlands
- Population: 21,545 (2021 census BUA profile)
- OS grid reference: SO9797
- Civil parish: Unparished
- Metropolitan borough: Walsall
- Metropolitan county: West Midlands
- Region: West Midlands
- Country: England
- Sovereign state: United Kingdom
- Areas of the town (2011 census BUASD): List: Bentley; Catherine Cross; Darlaston Green; Fallings Heath; King's Hill; Moxley; Rough Hay; The Flatts; Woods Bank
- Post town: Wednesbury
- Postcode district: WS10
- Dialling code: 0121
- Police: West Midlands
- Fire: West Midlands
- Ambulance: West Midlands
- UK Parliament: Wolverhampton South East

Darlaston is an industrial town in the Metropolitan Borough of Walsall in the West Midlands of England. It is located near Bilston, Walsall, Wednesbury, Willenhall and Tipton. It was historically part of Staffordshire.

== Topography ==
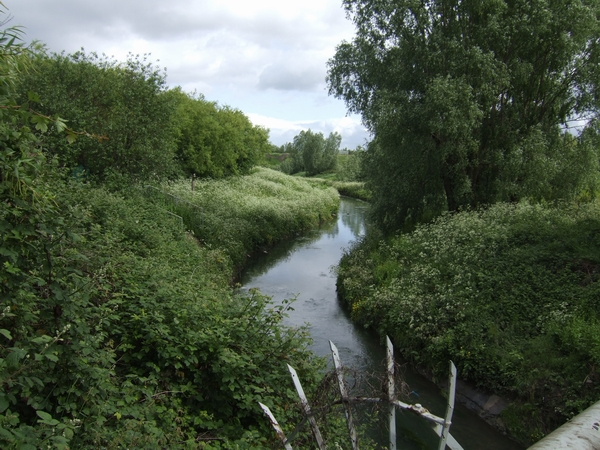
River Tarne, Darlaston

Darlaston is situated between Wednesbury and Walsall in the valley of the River Tame in the angle where the three major head-streams of the river converge. It is located on the South Staffordshire coalfield and has been an area of intense coal-mining activity. The underlying coal reserves were most likely deposited in the Carboniferous period.

Disused coal mines are found near Queen Street in Moxley, behind Pinfold Street JMI School, near Hewitt Street and Wolverhampton Street, in George Rose Park, and behind the police station in Victoria Park.

Mining subsidence, which has taken its toll on many buildings across central England, has also made its mark in Darlaston. In 1999, a council house on the New Moxley housing estate collapsed down a disused mineshaft, its occupant, an elderly man had complained of creaking and groaning in the house to neighbours who alerted the authorities. They in turn instructed him to leave. A few hours later it collapsed down the mine. The adjoining house also had to be demolished.

== History ==
The ancient origins of the town are now very obscure due to the archive record being relatively recent. Any archaeological evidence has been largely destroyed due to intensive coal mining during the 18th and 19th centuries. A possible Saxon castle probably existed at Darlaston, which eventually became a timber castle. No remains exist today.

Between the 12th and 15th centuries, the de Darlaston family were the landowners, When the de Darlaston family died out, the manor was taken over by the Hayes family and was known as Great Croft.

Darlaston's location on the South Staffordshire coalfield led to the early development of coal mining and associated industrial activities. At first such activity was relatively small scale requiring only a copyhold permission from the lord of the manor. So, for example, in 1698 Timothy Woodhouse was manager of the coal mines belonging to Mrs. Mary Offley, then the lady of the manor. In the first year, he sold 3,000 sacks of coal and later went into partnership in his own business.

Rapid industrial growth in the early decades of the 19th century brought with it problems of housing, poverty, and deprivation. In December 1839, the parish rector reported approximately 1,500 homes in the parish of Darlaston, most of which were in poor condition and owned by working-class people. In 1841, the town had a population of 6,000. Development was driven by the presence of excellent transport links: the Birmingham Canal Navigations and Grand Junction Railway. Much of the mining land was owned by the Birmingham Coal Company. Artist Thomas F. Worrall was born in the Woods Bank area in 1872, where his father worked as a blacksmith.

Notable beneficiaries of nineteenth-century industrialisation were the Rose family whose fortune had been made by astute enclosure of common land. Upon the death of Richard Rose in 1870 his estate was valued at over £877. He bequeathed the land to his wife Hannah. His brother was James Rose, shown in the 1871 census as a latch, bolt, and nut maker, employing 39 people, including 19 children. By the time of the 1881 census, James Rose was 55 and his business had expanded to employ 90 people. James Rose died in 1901.

In 1894, Darlaston became an urban district, and the local board became Darlaston Urban District Council. On 1 April 1966, the district was abolished and merged with the County Borough of Walsall and the County Borough of Wolverhampton. The parish was also abolished on 1 April 1966 and merged with Walsall and Wolverhampton. In 1961, the parish had a population of 21,839. In 1974, it became part of the metropolitan county of the West Midlands.

Darlaston was subject to several bombing raids in World War II. A Luftwaffe bombing on 5 June 1941 wrecked several council houses in Lowe Avenue, Rough Hay, and killed 11 people. The bomb had been aimed at Rubery Owen's factory but missed by some distance. The houses were later rebuilt.

Many Victorian terraced houses were demolished during the second half of the 20th century, and the Urban District Council of Darlaston built thousands of houses and flats to replace them with. Since 1999, the council-owned housing stock has been controlled by Darlaston Housing Trust. In 2001, two of the town's four multi-story blocks of flats were demolished, and the remaining two were demolished in 2004.

By the end of the 1980s, most of the industry in the town had closed and the town is now considered a ghost town, with an increasingly high level of unemployment. In 2011 a total of 15 derelict sites in the town were designated as enterprise zones offering tax breaks and relaxed planning laws to any businesses interested in setting up bases in the selected areas. These enterprise zones are expected to create thousands of jobs and ease the town's long-running unemployment crisis, which has deepened since 2008 as a result of the recession.

== Education ==
The town is served by one large secondary school, Grace Academy, which replaced Darlaston Community Science College on 1 September 2009.

== Demographics ==
According to the 2021 census, Darlaston's built-up area population was 21,545 residents. Of the findings, the ethnicity and religious composition of the wards separately were:

Darlaston: 2021 census
Ethnic group	Population	%
White	13,715	63.7%
Asian or Asian British	5,150	23.9%
Black or Black British	1,441	6.7%
Mixed	942	4.4%
Other Ethnic Group	224	1%
Arab	73	0.3%
Total	21,545	100%

The religious composition of the built-up area at the 2021 census was recorded as:

Darlaston: religion: 2021 census
Religious	Population	%
Christian	8,272	40.5%
Irreligious	6,677	32.7%
Muslim	3,564	17.5%
Sikh	1,122	5.5%
Hindu	494	2.4%
Other religion	238	1.2%
Buddhist	26	0.2%
Jewish	9	0.1%
Total	21,545	100%

The tables show that Darlaston is an ethnically diverse town and has several religions being followed.

== Notable buildings ==
=== All Saints church ===
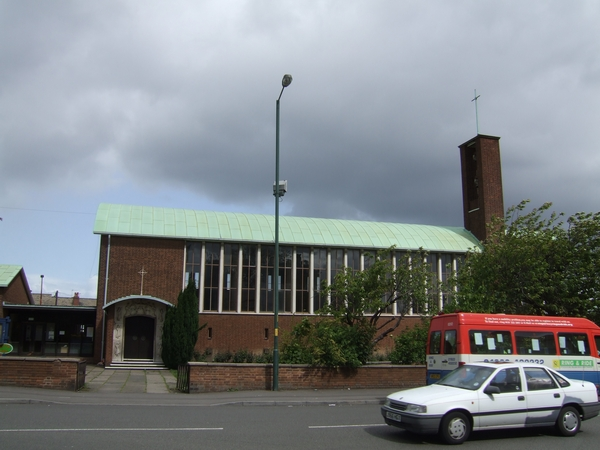
All Saints Darlaston

All Saints' Church, Darlaston (built 1872) was destroyed by enemy air raids in July 1942. A new church opened in 1952, designed by local architect Richard Twentyman. It is grade II listed.

=== Bentley Old Hall ===
Bentley Old Hall stood in the north of Darlaston until the early 20th century. Bentley Hall was one of several country houses where in 1651 – after the Battle of Worcester – the future Charles II was sheltered, here by Colonel John Lane. The future king finally escaped disguised as the servant of Jane Lane, the colonel's sister. Bentley Old Hall grounds were redeveloped as a housing estate in the 1950s.

=== Darlaston Manor House ===
The location of the manor house is believed to be congruent with the Asda supermarket car park, slightly south west of the original parish church, now St Lawrence's Church.

=== Darlaston Town Hall ===
Darlaston Town Hall was designed by the Birmingham architect Jethro Anstice Cossins (1830–1917), and it was opened in 1888, built on the site of one of the town's two workhouses. It comprised municipal offices, a public library and a public hall. Between 2006 and 2008 the building was restored by Walsall Borough Council at a cost of about £400,000. The main building now houses local Social Services departments, while the hall continues to be used for public meetings, concerts of music and other entertainments.

=== Darlaston Windmill ===
Darlaston had its own windmill from as early as 1695, when it appears on a map of that date. The mill continued to be in use until about 1860.

=== St Lawrence Darlaston ===
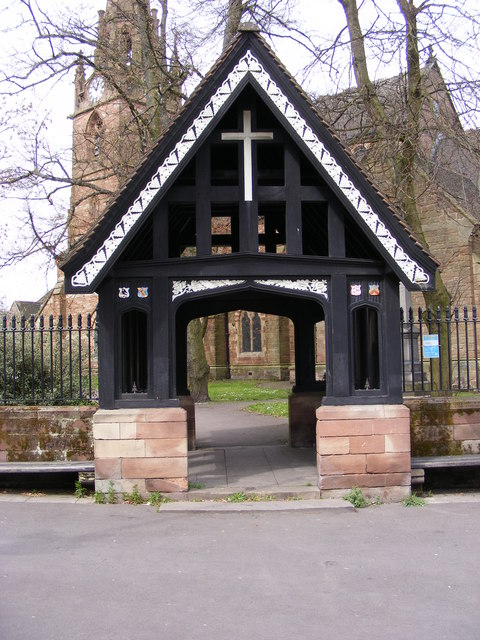
Lych gate of St Lawrence Darlaston

The Grade-II listed St Lawrence's church dates largely from the 1870s and was designed by A. P. Brevitt. The site dates back to early medieval times, and the church registers begin in 1539 and are held at the county archives in Stafford. The Bishop's Transcripts are held at Lichfield Record Office.

A grant from the UK Heritage Lottery Fund enabled the complete redecoration of the church's interior in 2018.

== Suburban areas ==
=== Butcroft ===
Butcroft was the name for the area across the former railway line and adjacent to the original Darlaston railway station. It is a named location in a trade directory published in 1861. Butcroft was described as a middle-class area in a contemporary study of the growth of Darlaston in the 19th-century.

=== Darlaston Green ===
Darlaston Green lies to the north of Darlaston town centre. A coal mine named Darlaston Green was included in an 1889 list of abandoned mines. An 1872 publication listed the Darlaston Green works, owned by the Darlaston Steel and Iron Co. Ltd, as having firstly 38 puddling furnaces and eight rolling mills.

=== King's Hill ===
King's Hill was placed in the County Borough of Walsall in 1966, having been transferred from the Municipal Borough of Wednesbury under a local government reorganisation. It lies to the south east of Darlaston town centre on the A462 road. St Andrew's Mission Church, a chapel of ease to Wednesbury parish church was consecrated in 1894. The church closed for worship in 2009 and the building has been repurposed. Its stained glass windows and World War memorials were relocated to Darlaston Town Hall. A recreation ground was opened in 1900, which Ordnance Survey maps show was later named King's Hill Park.

=== Woods Bank ===
Woods Bank lies southwest of Darlaston town centre, close to the Black Country New Road and the village of Moxley. It borders the borough of Sandwell and is primarily residential.

The number of houses in the Woods Bank area increased by 87% between 1841 and 1871, and a sanitary report of 1875 describes a dwelling there as consisting of one lower and one upper room, with no ventilation or back door. In comparison with the rest of Darlaston, Woods Bank suffered greatly from unemployment in the iron trade as a result of the mid to late 1870s UK-wide economic depression, and has been described as "a distinct location of poor ironworkers".

== Notable residents ==
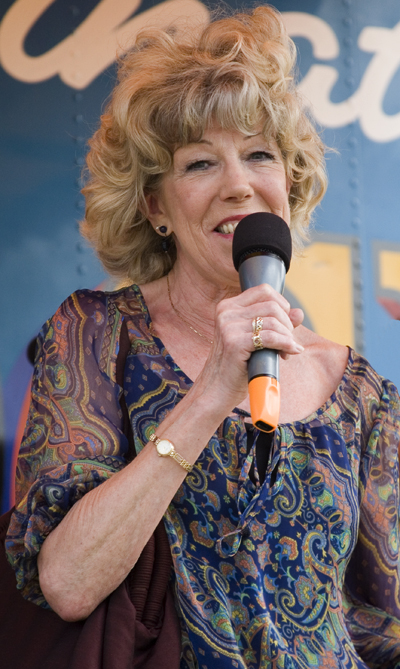
Sue Nicholls, 2010

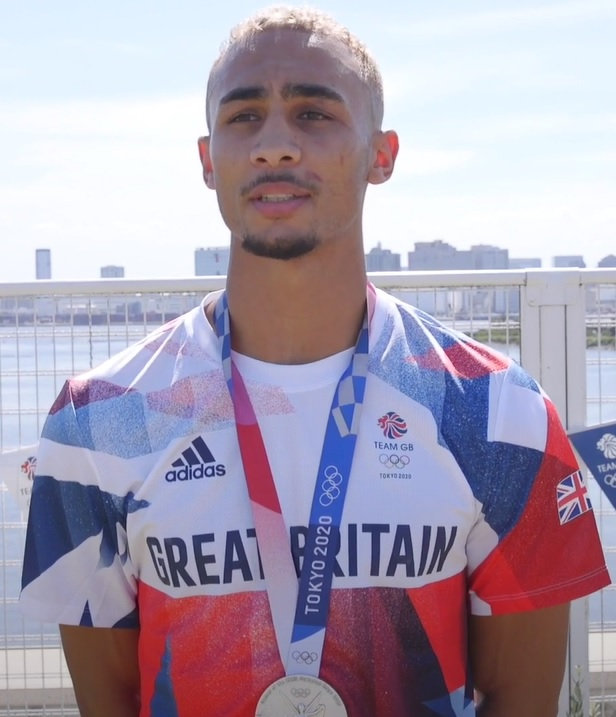
Ben Whittaker, 2021

- Richard Blakemore (1775–1855), an ironmaster and MP in southern Wales.
- Sir Edwin Cooper Perry, GCVO (1856–1938), physician, medical administrator and Vice-Chancellor of the University of London
- Samuel Leeds (born 1991), social media influencer, property trainer and investor
- Morris and Cowley (1895-1972 & 1898-1975), aka Harry & Frank Birkenhead, variety show comedians, popular as a double act
- Sue Nicholls (born 1943), an actress known for playing Audrey Roberts in Coronation Street. The family-owned White Lion pub is in the Fold Darlaston.
- John Fiddler (born 1947), musician and Medicine Head member
- Mark Rhodes (born 1981), runner-up in ITV's Pop Idol in 2003, and children's TV presenter

=== Sport ===
- Billy Annis (1874–1938), played 138 games for the Wolves, 1898-1905
- Ted Pheasant (1875–1910), footballer, who played 159 games for Wolves and 140 for West Brom
- Eddie Gettins (1883–1925), footballer who played 257 games
- Syd Gibbons (1907–1953), footballer, played 299 games for Fulham.
- Bill Guttridge (1931–2013), footballer who played 276 games including 198 for Walsall and a manager.
- Graham Warner (born 1945), cricketer who played 30 First-class cricket matches.
- Graham Hawkins (1946–2016), former footballer who played 450 games and manager of Wolves 1982/84.
- Mel Eves (born 1956), footballer who played 243 games including 180 for Wolves
- Stuart Elwell (born 1977) professional boxer and former Midlands Welterweight Champion
- Mark Lewis-Francis (born 1982), sprinter, team gold medallist in the 100 metre relay at 2004 Summer Olympics.
- Netan Sansara (born 1989), footballer, played over 200 games and the first Asian to play for the England U-18 team. His grandfather owned two pubs in Darlaston.
- Benjamin Whittaker (born 1997), professional boxer and silver medallist at the 2020 Summer Olympics.

== Public transport ==
=== Buses ===
Buses which serve Darlaston town centre stop at Darlaston Town Bus Interchange. Services run to Lodge Farm, Bentley, Willenhall, The Lunt, Bilston, Wolverhampton, Moxley, Walsall, Pleck, Wednesbury, and West Bromwich.

Services 34, 37, 39 and 79 are operated by National Express West Midlands. Services 65 and 310 are operated by Diamond West Midlands.

Local operator Thandi previously had a large presence in Darlaston up until 2023 when the business closed their commercial bus services.

=== Canals ===
The 7 miles (11 km) Walsall Canal runs through the town forming part of the Birmingham Canal Navigations.

=== Rail ===
Darlaston railway station on the South Staffordshire line was opened in 1863 and closed in 1887 and there is little evidence of its existence at the site, although the former trackbed is in use as a footpath. Darlaston James Bridge railway station was opened in 1837 on what is now the Walsall to Wolverhampton line but closed in 1965 amid the Beeching cuts. It reopened on March 19th, 2026 as simply Darlaston.

=== Roads ===
Since the early 1970s, the town centre has been bypassed by St Lawrence's Way, which runs between The Green and Great Croft Street Island by the town's Asda. No motorway runs through the town, but a section of the M6 between J9 and J10 may be considered to be in Darlaston. Also the A462 from Wednesbury runs through the town on its way to Willenhall, the A454/A463 Black Country Route have a Junction on the Darlaston/Willenhall border and the A4444 Black Country New Road meets the A41 London – Ellesmere Port Road and A4038 near to Moxley War Memorial and the Walsall Canal. The A4038 runs through the Town as the Moxley Road, Pinfold Street and Walsall Road and has a junction with the A462 near to Darlaston Library. The A4038 links the A4444 Black Country New Road and the A41 Black Country New Road and Moxley High Street to Walsall Via Darlaston and Pleck

=== Trams ===
Since 1999, there has been a West Midlands Metro stop at Bradley Lane in the Moxley area of the town. An initial plan was for the Metro to have a stop in Picturdrome Way using the old Darlaston railway line but this was abandoned.

== Recreation ==
The town has a few small open spaces such as the playing fields at Broadwaters Road and three parks: Kings Hill Park, George Rose Park and Victoria Park.

=== Sports clubs ===
The town is represented in football by Darlaston Town (1874) FC who currently compete in the West Midlands (Regional) League. The town's football club used to be Darlaston Town FC, but the club went out of business in 2013.
