= Darlaston Loop =

Defunct railway in England

Coordinates: 52.56644°N 2.03393°W

The Darlaston Loop was a railway which connected the towns of Walsall, Darlaston and Wednesbury in the West Midlands of England. It was so named because it passed through the town of Darlaston.

== Opening ==
The line was opened in 1863 to bypass the recently constructed railway through Walsall. It operated as a single track until a second track was added in 1872, and the only station on the line was located in Darlaston town centre.

== Closure ==
It closed in 1887 but the line remained open to goods trains for another 80 years or so, when it finally closed during the 1960s.

== The site today ==
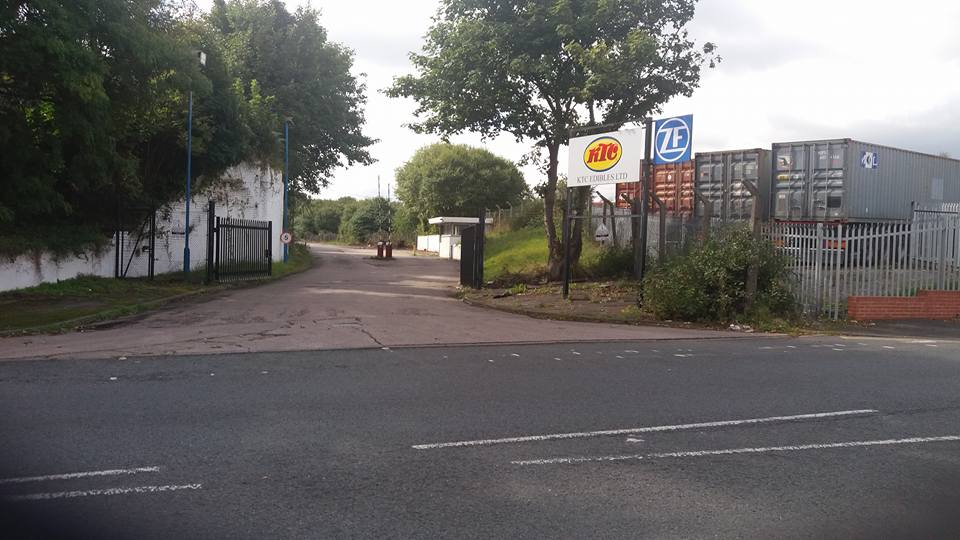
The former level crossing on Heath Road. The Darlaston Loop ran to the right near the containers

A public footpath has been created along some of the trackbed, including the section which passed through Darlaston Station although the section to Wednesbury Town is now built on by both industrial and housing. A disused railway building stood on Crescent Road nearly 50 years after falling into disuse.
