= Public Library and Baths, Balsall Heath =

Public library in Balsall Heath, Birmingham, England

Coordinates: 52°27′27.15″N 1°53′8.92″W

Moseley Road Baths and Balsall Heath Library
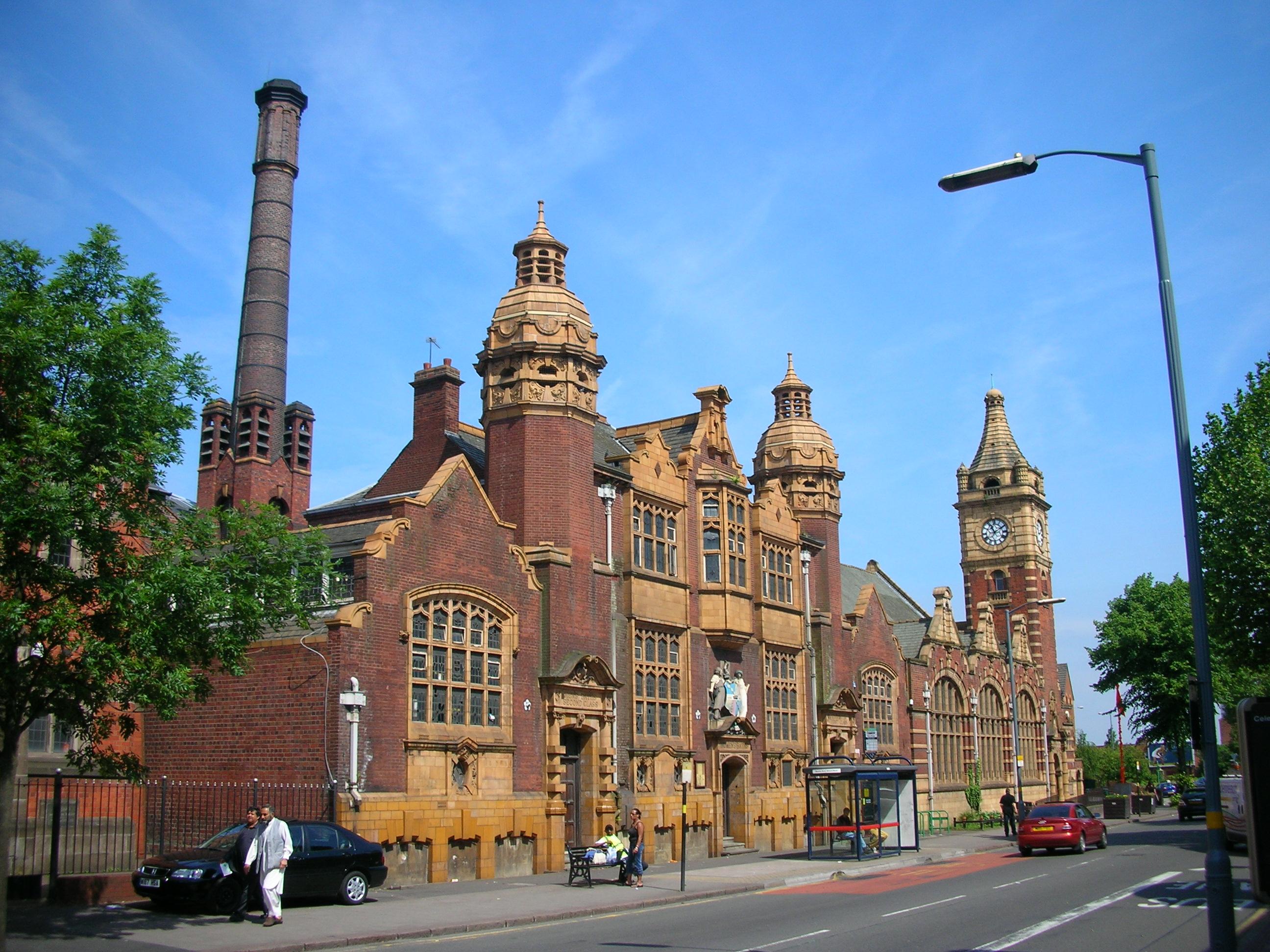
- Interactive map of the Moseley Road Baths and Balsall Heath Library area
- Alternative names: Balsall Heath Baths and Library

General information
- Status: Completed
- Architectural style: Edwardian
- Location: Balsall Heath, Birmingham, England
- Opened: 1895 (library); 1907 (baths)

Design and construction
- Architects: Jethro A. Cossins and F. B. Peacock (library); William Hale and Son (baths)
- Designations: Grade II* listed

Website
- moseleyroadbaths.org.uk

The Public Library and Baths (grid reference SP078843) on Moseley Road, Balsall Heath, form one of many pairings of baths and libraries in Birmingham, England.

The library was opened in 1895, with the baths following in 1907. Made of red brick and terracotta in Edwardian style, the structure is one of only three swimming pools in the country listed at Grade II* status.

The buildings are owned by Birmingham City Council. The library is still run by the council, while the Baths are now run by a community enterprise, Moseley Road Baths CIO, following previous Council plans for them to be closed.

== History ==
=== Planning ===
During discussions in 1890 regarding the incorporation of the Balsall Heath district into the city of Birmingham, it was decided that public baths should be built as soon as possible for the area if Birmingham were to acquire the district. A bill was passed, and Balsall Heath was officially annexed into Birmingham on 1 October 1891. The City of Birmingham Baths Department was then tasked with finding an appropriate site for the construction of public baths in the area.

Working in conjunction with the Free Libraries Committee (a library had also been promised to the residents of Balsall Heath as part of the arrangement that incorporated their district into Birmingham), the Baths Department soon identified a site on Moseley Road, near the junction with Edward Road. A small cartway known as Midland Grove ran behind the site, and the access it provided for the delivery of coal to the rear of the building was a key factor in the decision to select this particular location.

=== Construction and opening ===
The Free Library opened in 1895 and has a clock tower. It was designed by Jethro A. Cossins and F. B. Peacock. The baths were added immediately to the south and were opened on 30 October 1907, much later than planned owing to severe delays experienced in boring a well on the premises. They were designed by William Hale and Son of 83, Colmore Row, and cost almost £34,000. As was common practice at the time, there were separate entrances for first-class men, second-class men, and women.

Initially, only the 'slipper' bath departments were opened, with the pools coming into operation on 1 March 1908, the start of the municipal swimming season. On 21 November 1908, the first-class pool was floored over and the space subsequently used for social activities. It was one of several public baths to begin these activities in the winter months as there was little demand for the pools during this time of year.

=== Subsequent history ===
The baths were used as a makeshift hospital in the early years of World War II. An additional entrance was created to facilitate this purpose, which was subsequently used as a fire exit from Pool 2. By the end of 2010 a steel beam used to support the wall and roof above it had become severely corroded, leading to the pool's closure as this part of the building was in danger of collapse.

Today, the library remains a functioning branch of Birmingham Library Services. The baths, originally ran by Birmingham City Council, are operated by Moseley Road Baths CIO. They reopened following extensive structural work during 2005. They stand opposite the College of Art and were listed at Grade II as a single entity in 1982, upgraded to Grade II* status in 2004 by the Department for Culture, Media and Sport.

In 2006 a Friends of Moseley Road Baths group was formed to campaign for the long-term future of the building as a fully functioning swimming facility. Since their formation various community events and fundraisers have been held, including the centenary celebration on 30 October 2007 which was attended by the Lord Mayor of Birmingham and swimmers past and present. In 2010 the Friends' group was awarded a Heritage Lottery Fund grant of £48,000 to document the building's history and to interview former and current users of the building. Some aspects of the project are now online.

In October 2021, the building was one of 142 sites across England to receive part of a £35-million injection into the government's Culture Recovery Fund.

== Facilities ==
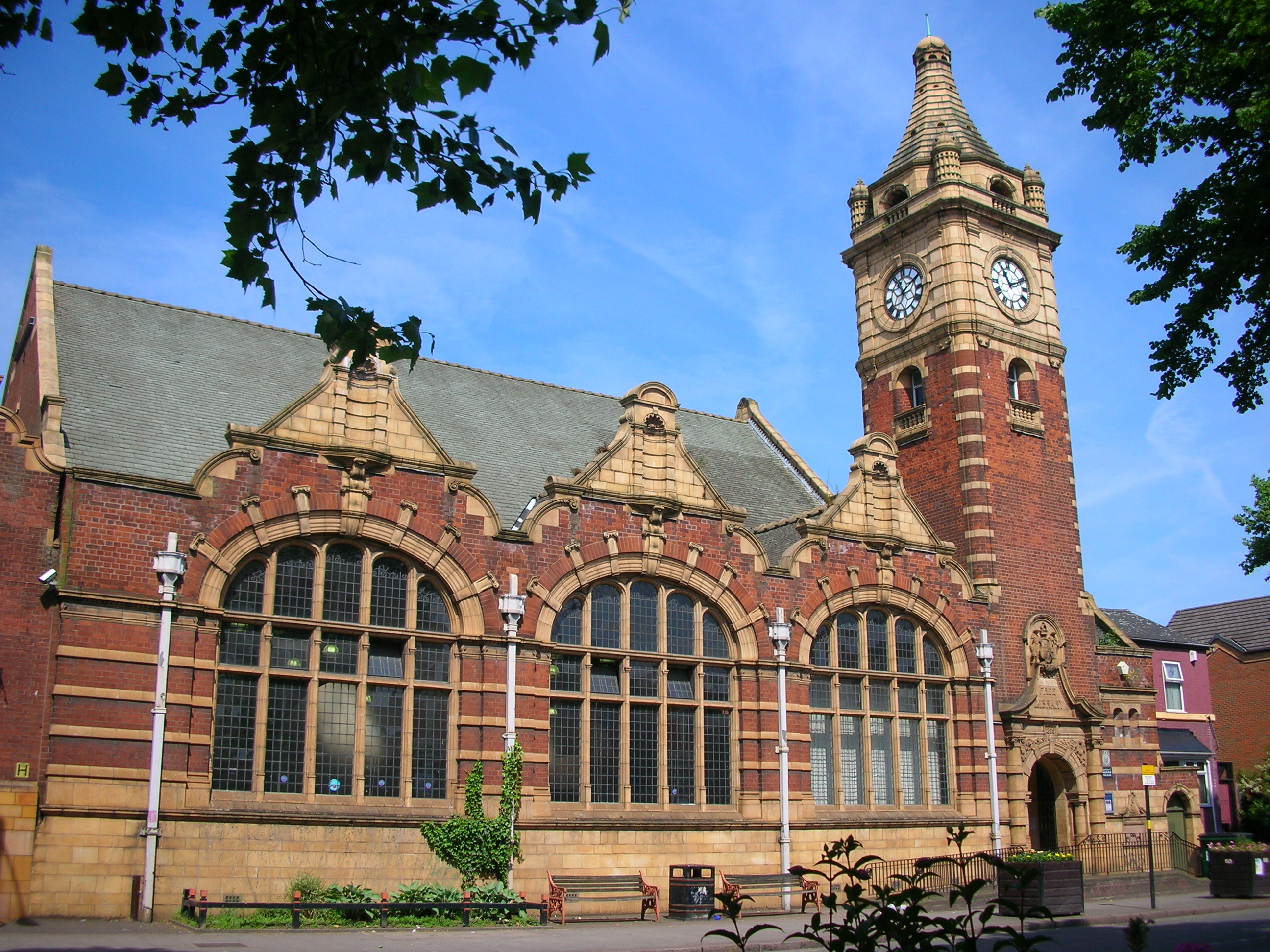
The public library with its clock tower

The baths building consists of two swimming pools (the first-class or "Gala" pool and the second-class pool), three 'slipper' bath departments (men's first-class, men's second-class, and women's) comprising a total of 46 private washing baths, a committee room which was primarily used for meetings of swimming clubs, a flat formerly used by the resident money-taker, a boiler house containing two 1950s coal-fired boilers and a water filter room containing two filtration tanks dating from the 1930s. The boiler house has three levels: ground contains the boilers, first floor contains the laundry room, second floor contain a large cast iron cold-water storage tank.

The building has three entrances, all of which led to a central booking desk. The first-class men's entrance led to Pool 1 and the first-class 'slipper' baths department. The second-class men's entrance led to Pool 2 and the second-class 'slipper' baths. The women's entrance led to the women's 'slipper' baths department.

Originally all bathers were supplied with a towel, soap and (for swimmers) a costume, collected from the baths attendant's kiosk. Towels and costumes were subsequently washed and dried in the steam laundry room located on the first floor of the boiler house.

Pool 1 is grand in its detailing. It contains 63 glazed brick cubicles, a three-sided spectator gallery, cast iron roof trusses and bowed, wrought iron balconettes. Pool 2 is less ornate and was the second-class pool. Pool 2 did not originally have cubicles and bathers changed on benches around the pool side.

== Future ==
The building reopened in April 2012 after 16 months of structural work on the fire exit of Pool 2, asbestos removal from the basement, and extensive cleaning and painting.

Pool 1 has been closed since 2003, and pool 2 closed in October 2023 for extensive renovation works. The second-class 'slipper' baths were in continual use until October 2004, but have since closed.

In January 2017 it was reported that the council plans to close the baths in June 2017. The Friends' group and an action group formed for the purpose explored options to keep the baths open under community ownership. It was announced that the pool would continue to stay open. The pool subsequently remained open to the community for swimming and Moseley Road Baths CIO until October 2023, and the Friends worked with the City Council, the National Trust, the World Monuments Fund and Historic England to draw up plans for a long-term restoration. On 2 October 2023 Moseley Road Baths closed for swimming and all other activities, as the next major phase of work to the building started. This first phase was expected to be completed in Spring 2025, and began in August 2024, led by ISG Ltd.

In May 2026, the renovation project was awarded a further £9.2 million grant from the National Lottery Heritage Fund, which completed funding for phase 2 of the baths' restoration project. Phase 2 will see the historic gala pool restored to public use for swimming, with the smaller pool 2 into a 'flexible event space'. Further works include the addition of a community health and wellbeing hub, a community gym, and a conversion of the boiler room into a flexible studio space. The site will be fully accessible and is expected to reopen in late 2028.
