= Eddie Gettins =

English footballer

Personal information
- Full name: Charles Edward Gettins
- Date of birth: 1883
- Place of birth: Darlaston, England
- Date of death: 1925 (aged 41–42)
- Position: Inside forward

Senior career*
Years	Team	Apps	(Gls)
1898–1903	Gainsborough Trinity	110	(29)
1903–1905	Middlesbrough	44	(5)
1905–1907	Reading		
1907–1909	Glossop	41	(0)
1909–1911	Stockport County	62	(0)
1911	Haslingden		
Total		257	(34)
- * Club domestic league appearances and goals

Charles Edward Gettins (1883–1925) was an English footballer who played in the Football League for Gainsborough Trinity, Glossop, Middlesbrough and Stockport County.
