= Bescot =

Suburb of Walsall, West Midlands, England

Coordinates: 52.5654°N 1.9907°W

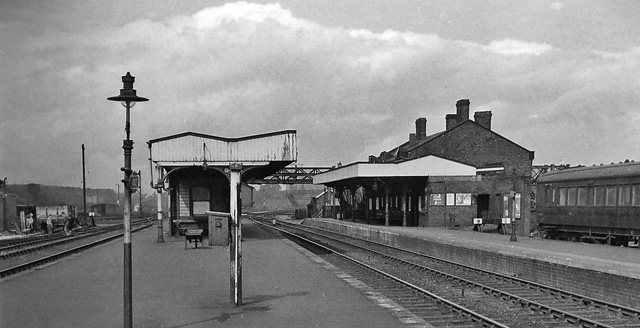
Bescot Station (now Bescot Stadium Station). View NW, towards Wolverhampton (left) and Walsall (right); Birmingham - Wolverhampton (ex-Grand Junction) - Stafford etc. main line, junction of line to Walsall, Rugeley, Lichfield etc.

Bescot is an area of Walsall in the West Midlands of England. It is served by Bescot Stadium railway station, adjacent to which is Bescot depot where locomotives are maintained. The Banks's Stadium was built in 1990 for Walsall F.C. The area is bisected by the M6 motorway, including its 'Junction 9', where it meets the A461 which leads to Pleck and Wednesbury. The River Tame also runs through the area.

== History ==
Bescot was mentioned in the Domesday Book of 1086 as a carucate of waste land in the possession of the King. It was mentioned in other ancient writings under the name of 'Berkenscot' and 'Bresmundscote'. An ancient manor house was then constructed before 1311 in the area and first possessed by the Hillary family. In 1403, Sir Roger Hillary died and the manor was passed on to the possession of his wife, Margaret. When she died, the property was passed on to Sir John Saer de Rochford, Roger's nephew. It later passed into the possession of the Mountfort family. In 1460, the manor passed into the possession of Sir Baldwin Mountfort following the death of Sir William Mountfort. Edward Mountfort, who died in 1691, appears to be the last male heir in the family and the estate was passed on to his daughter who passed it on to her husband Jonas Slaney in 1717. By 1717, the estate was stated as having an area of 507 acres (2.05 km^{2}). Slaney sold the estate to Richard Wilks and in 1794, the estate was purchased by Richmond Aston.

During the Industrial Revolution, Bescot was dominated by the Forge Works, owned by Edward Elwell Ltd. The works featured a tall, tapered chimney and a pool from which water was extracted, called Elwell's Pool. The forge employed 300 people and manufactured spades, hoes, shovels and axes.
