= Lode Heath School =

School in Solihull, England

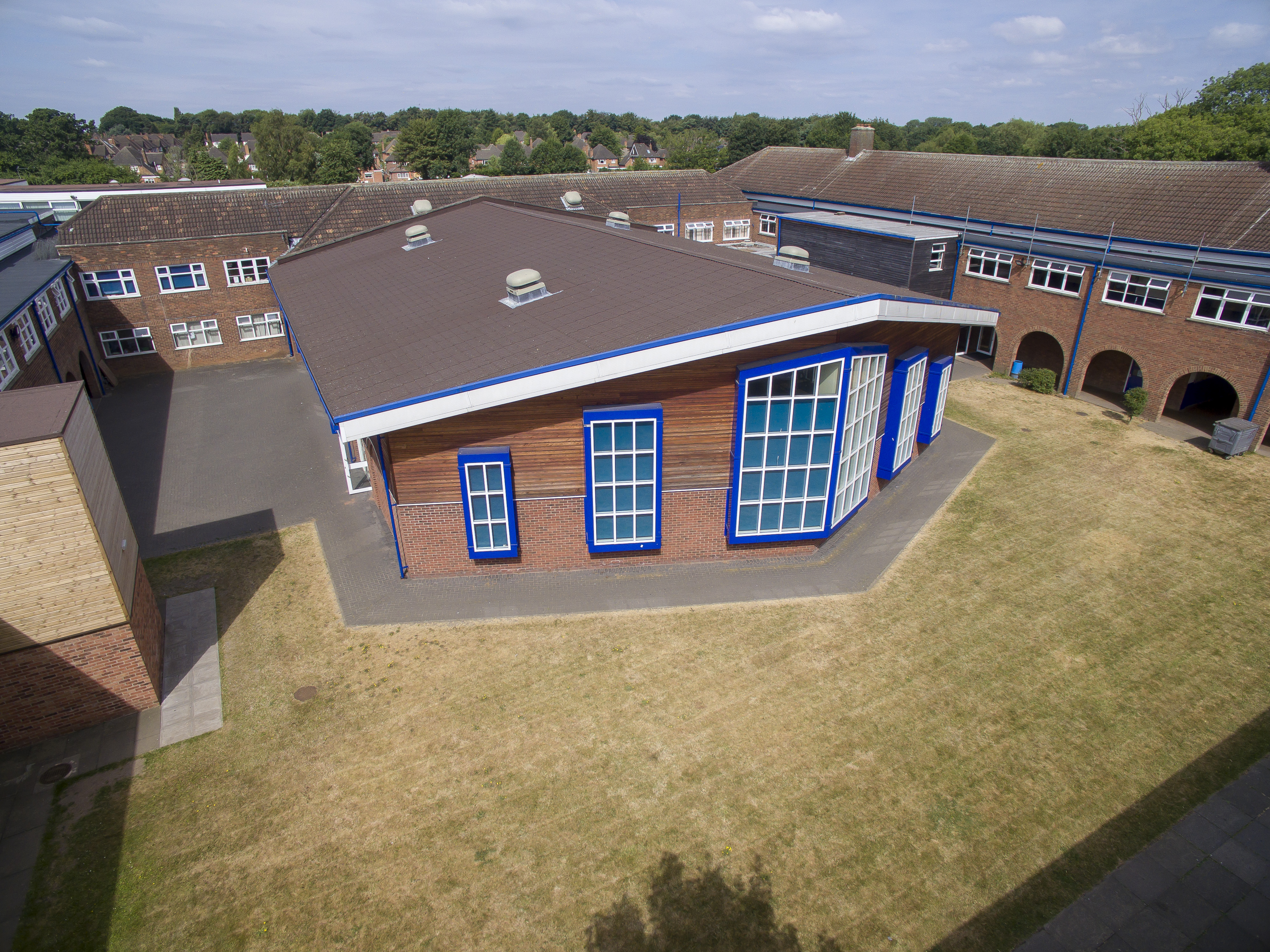

Location
- Lode Lane; Solihull, West Midlands, B91 2HW; England; 52.4256°N 1.7780°W

Information
- Type: Academy
- Established: 1939
- Department for Education URN: 137008 Tables
- Ofsted: Reports
- Head teacher: Laura Suddon
- Gender: Coeducational
- Age: 11 to 16
- Enrolment: 1162
- Capacity: 1115
- Website: http://www.lodeheath.org.uk

Lode Heath School is an Academy secondary school in the Lode Heath district of Solihull, West Midlands, England.

It is situated approximately 1 mile north of Solihull town centre off the B425 towards Sheldon, Birmingham.

== Alumni ==
- Andre Green, footballer
- Pc Steve Quartermain recipient of the Queen’s Gallantry Medal
- Luke Wright

== History ==
The school first opened in 1939 and was the base from which a number of other Solihull schools were started. In September 2011, LHS converted to become an Academy.

== Ofsted judgements ==
As of 2022, the school's last full inspection by Ofsted was in 2019, with a judgement of Good.
