= Bescot Hall =

- Interactive map of the Bescot Hall area

General information
- Type: Manor house
- Classification: Grade I
- Location: Bescot, United Kingdom
- Coordinates: 52.568611°N 2.003365°W
- Opened: Before 1311
- Closed: 1937

Design and construction
- Architect: Hillary family

Bescot Hall is a former manor house in the area of Walsall in England that is known as Bescot. Only partial earthworks remain, including the moat, which is a shallow depression for most of its circuit.

== History ==
Bescot Hall was constructed before 1311 and it was first possessed by the Hillary family; it may have been associated with the nearby Bescot Castle. In 1403, Sir Roger Hillary died and the manor was passed on to the possession of his wife, Margaret. When she died, the property was passed on to Sir John Saer de Rochford, Roger's nephew. It later passed into the possession of the Mountfort family.

In 1460, the manor passed into the possession of Sir Baldwin Mountfort following the death of Sir William Mountfort. Edward Mountfort, who died in 1691, appears to be the last male heir in the family and the estate was passed on to his daughter who passed it on to her husband Jonas Slaney in 1717. By 1717, the estate was stated as having an area of 507 acres (2.05 km^{2}). Slaney sold the estate to Richard Wilks and in 1794, the estate was purchased by Richmond Aston.

The original building was demolished during the 18th century and it was rebuilt on a new site north-east of the original moat on what is now the west side of Bescot Drive. The second building was used as a private school between 1922–29 and it was eventually demolished in 1937 and only earthworks remain.
