= Jethro Cossins =

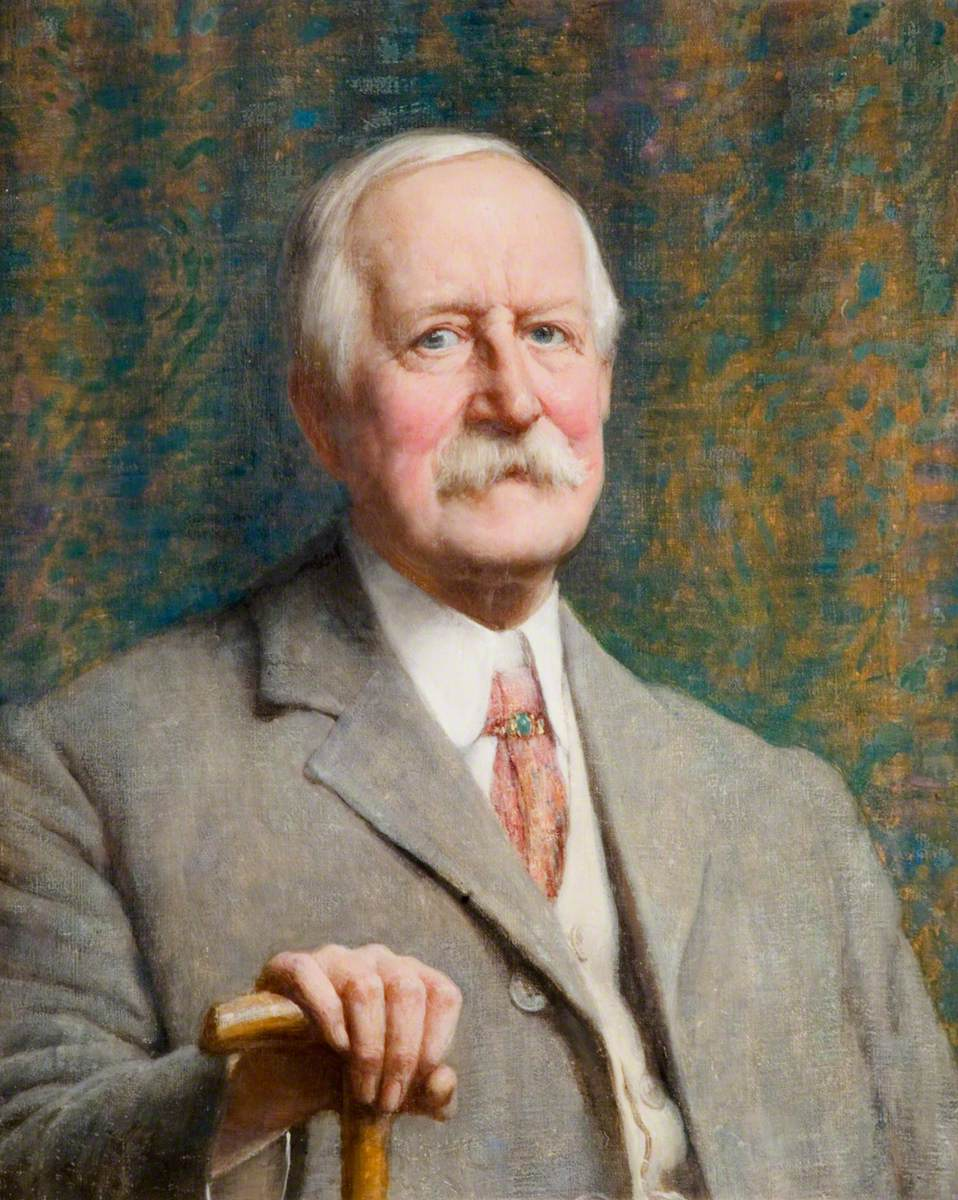
Jethro Anstice Cossins, 1911–16

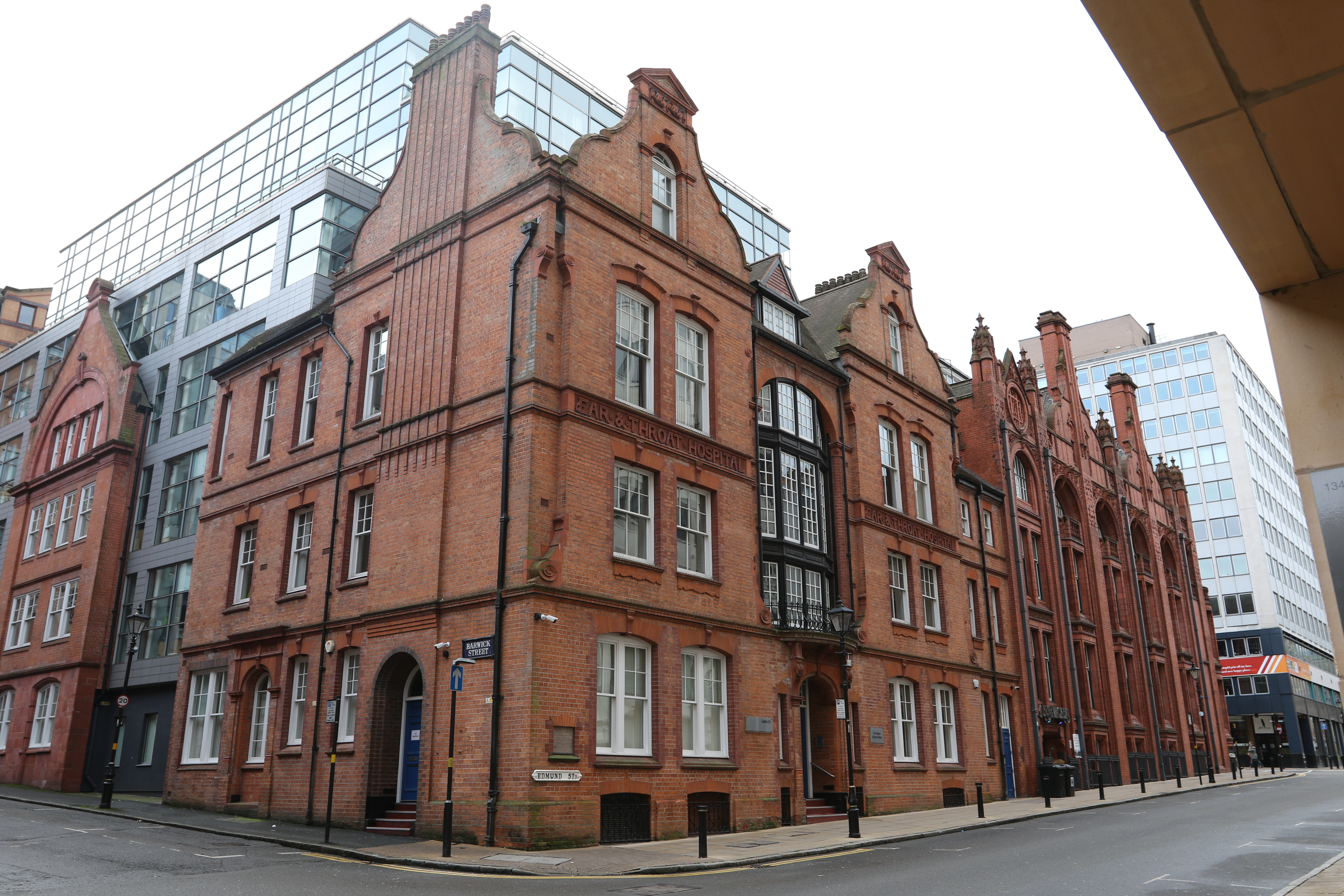
Former Birmingham and Midland Ear, Nose and Throat Hospital, Edmund Street and Barwick Street, Birmingham

Jethro Anstice Cossins (7 July 1830 – 1917) was a British architect, who practised mainly in Birmingham during the 19th century.

== Background ==
He was born on 7 July 1830 in Kingsdon, Somerset, the son of John Cossins.

He died on 5 December 1917 at the Birmingham and Midland Institute, Birmingham and left an estate valued at £11,613 12s. 1d (equivalent to £696,600 in 2025). A funeral service was held on 8 December 1917 at the Birmingham Crematorium.

== Career ==
He was apprenticed to Mr. Fiddian of London. Later he became the partner of Mr. J.G. Bland. In 1879 he began to practice on his own account. He was employed by Sir Josiah Mason in the erection of Mason College and other works. He designed the Norwich Union Buildings in Congreve Street (originally planned to be the Liberal Club), and were afterwards used for a time as a High School for Girls. Other buildings erected from his designs included the Unitarian Chapel in Bristol Street, The Jubilee Fountain Stratford-upon-Avon, Sutton Grammar School, The Cromwell Street Schools, and Darlaston Town Hall. He also directed the building of the Barbados Mutual Life Assurance Company in the West Indies.

He formed a successful partnership with Barry Peacock in 1890 and Ernest Bewlay in 1900 to form Cossins and Peacock and then Cossins, Peacock and Bewlay architectural partnerships. Many of the buildings they designed have been listed. Notable examples include the Balsall Heath Library and the former Birmingham Ear Nose and Throat Hospital.

He was president of the Birmingham Archaeological Society, a member of the Council of the Birmingham and Midland Institute, a vice-President of the Royal Society of Artists, a President of the Birmingham Architectural Society, a member of the committee of the Municipal School of Art, and of the Society for the Protection of Ancient Buildings.

For many years he was involved with the Aston Hall Company in restoring the building.

== Selected List of Works ==
=== Barbados (West Indies) ===
Barbados Mutual Life Assurance Company buildings

=== Birmingham ===
- 8A-10 Bordesley Street, Birmingham 1882-84
- 15 Westbourne Road, Birmingham 1881-82 Grade II
- Birmingham Ear, Nose and Throat Hospital, Edmund Street, 1890-1, Grade II (with Peacock)
- Gun Barrel Proof House (curators house, entrance range and forecourt), 1883, Grade II*
- Birmingham Town Hall 1889-91 (new entrance hall and staircases) (with Peacock)
- Bloomsbury Library, Nechells, 1890, Grade II
- Cromwell Junior and Infant School, 1888, Grade II
- Mason Science College, Edmund Street, 1880, demolished in 1964
- Norwich Union Buildings, Congreve Street
- Balsall Heath Library, 1895, Grade II*
- Old Liberal Club, Edmund Street, 1883, demolished 1964
- Unitarian Chapel, Bristol Street

=== Darlaston ===
Darlaston Town Hall, 1888.

=== Stratford upon Avon ===
- Shakespeare Memorial Fountain (also known as the American Fountain, or Jubilee Fountain), Rother Street, Stratford upon Avon, 1886-7, Grade II* *Unitarian Old Meeting House, Bristol Street, Birmingham 1885 (demolished)

=== Sutton Coldfield ===
- 15 Wentworth Road, Sutton Coldfield 1908
- Sutton Grammar School
