= Moxley, West Midlands =

Village in West Midlands County, England

Coordinates: 52.560°N 2.054°W

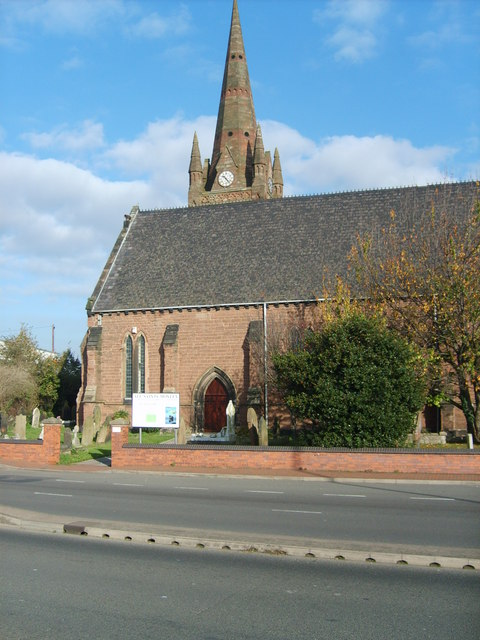
All Saints' Church

Moxley is a village near Darlaston in the Metropolitan Borough of Walsall, West Midlands County, England. It was first developed during the early part of the 19th century when a handful of terraced houses were built to accommodate locals working in factories and mines and the area was created in 1845 out of land from Darlaston, Bilston and Wednesbury.

== Notable local events ==
Moxley has been the subject of local headlines numerous times.

In May 1999, a semi-detached council house on Hughes Road was severely damaged when a disused mineshaft below the property collapsed causing all of the dwelling to collapse with it. As a result of the damage and weakened structure, the attached property also had to be demolished.

In January 2002, Walsall Council announces plans to demolish the 127-home estate around Harrowby Road (known as the Bradley Lodge estate when it was built by Bilston Council in the 1930s) due to mining subsidence, which already forced more than half of the estate's residents to move. By February 2004, just 20 families remained on the estate and the first properties were demolished; this number had fallen to four by the autumn of 2005, by which time most of the demolition was complete. After July 2007 there was one resident still on the estate, who finally moved out in September 2013 more than a decade after the redevelopment of the estate was first planned, and more than six years after his last neighbour moved out. A new estate consisting of private and public sector housing has since been built on its site. The regeneration of Harrowby Road has also seen the demolition of flats and houses on neighbouring Belmont Gardens which dated from around 1970, with these properties being demolished during 2005.

A similar regeneration took place on nearby Curtin Drive in 2007, when two three-storey blocks of 1950s council flats were demolished, having stood derelict for several years and been subjected to extensive vandalism and arson attacks. New public sector housing has since been built on the site.

== Religion ==
The All Saints' church, which is in the Anglican diocese of Lichfield is a prominent landmark in the area and still an active place of worship. There was also the Moxley Methodist Church, however it has since closed and was sold in 2020 for other uses.

== Transport ==
It is centred on the historic London to Holyhead Road and, since the 1990s, has been bypassed by the Black Country New Road. The northern stub of the spine road links the main A41 road with the Black Country Route; both of these roads opened simultaneously in July 1995. The section of Church Street and Holyhead Road leading up to the junction with Bilston Road just over the border in Wednesbury was widened in 1997 to cope with spine road traffic, linking up with the remaining section of the route which gives an unbroken dual carriageway link with junction 1 of the M5 motorway at West Bromwich.

It has public transport connections with Wolverhampton, Birmingham, Wednesbury, Darlaston, and Walsall.

Moxley is served by the West Midlands Metro with a stop located in Bradley Lane, which was opened in 1999 along the route of a railway line which had been closed to passengers in 1972 but part of it remained open to freight trains until 1992.

Several public bus services serve Moxley these are list below:

- National Express West Midlands service 39 links the town to Stowlawn, Bilston, Darlaston and Walsall
- National Express West Midlands service 79 links the town with Birmingham,West Bromwich, Wednesbury, Darlaston, Bilston and Wolverhampton
- Banga Bus (Monday to Saturday) & National Express (Sunday) service 530 links the town with Rocket Pool, Bilston and Wolverhampton.
- Carolean Coaches service 23/23A links the town with Willenhall, Wednesbury and Portobello and Bilston.

On 5 January 2025 service 23 was taken over by Carolean and extended to Willenhall, under contract to TfWM. Service 80 was withdrawn and merged with the 23A to save costs.

== Education ==
The nearest secondary school is The Grace Academy, approximately one mile away near Darlaston town centre.

The local primary school is Moorcroft Wood Primary School, which opened in September 2005 as result of the amalgamation of Moxley Infant School in Moxley Road, and Dorothy Purcell Junior School in Bull Lane. The school was split between the two sites for over a year until the Moxley Road site was closed and the infant department moved to the Bull Lane site in November 2006. Moxley Infant School, which was built in 1927, stood derelict for three years until its demolition. It is now a haulage yard. express and star 26 January 2012 - the school site has been proposed as the site for a new 'Bail hostel' where convicted criminals will be incarcerated whilst on bail. Local opposition is very strong and a petition is underway and other protests being carried on. See the bail hostel in Moxley web site.

== Open space ==
The most significant public open space in Moxley is Moorcroft Wood a Local Nature Reserve. In July 2020 it was announced that Moorcroft Wood was granted UNESCO Global Geopark status due to its mining history and large slag deposits from the Moorcroft Iron works.

== Community facilities ==
The Moxley People's Centre on Moxley High Street is a focus for the local community.

Adjacent to Moorcroft Wood is the Moorcroft Environment Centre operated by the Wildlife Trust for Birmingham and the Black Country, it has since been closed down due to cut backs.
