= Grace Academy, Darlaston =

Coordinates: 52.5692°N 2.0475°W

Grace Academy Darlaston

Location
- Herberts Park Road; Darlaston, West Midlands, WS10 8QJ; England

Information
- Type: Academy
- Religious affiliation: Christian
- Established: September 2009
- Founder: Lord Edmiston
- Local authority: Walsall LA
- Specialist: Business & Enterprise
- Department for Education URN: 135956 Tables
- Ofsted: Reports
- Gender: Coeducational
- Age: 11 to 18
- Enrolment: 1075
- Website: https://darlaston.graceacademy.org.uk/

Grace Academy Darlaston is a non-selective co-educational secondary school located in Walsall, England.

It was formerly Darlaston Community Science College which had been placed into special measures by OFSTED in January 2008 and failed to raise standards in the allotted time. As a result, it was converted into an Academy on 1 September 2009 using the same buildings.

A new, purpose-built academy building was opened in September 2013, and the previous school buildings demolished to make way for astroturf sports facilities for the new school site.

The academy was formerly operated by Grace Foundation incorporated by Lord Edmiston – entrepreneur of International Motors Ltd and founder of the evangelical charity Christian Vision, then became part of Tove Learning Trust on 1 April 2019 headed by CEO Jamie Clarke.

Carl Salt was appointed Principal in April 2016 and led the academy to achieve an OFSTED rating of Good in April 2017.

== Notable alumni ==
=== Darlaston Comprehensive/Community Science College ===
- Mark Rhodes, singer and television presenter

== See also ==
- Grace Academy (Solihull)
- Grace Academy (Coventry)
- List of schools in Walsall
