= Christian Vision =

CV, formerly known as Christian Vision, is a large international Christian ministry established in 1988, based in the United Kingdom. CV was founded by Lord Edmiston, with a vision to "reach one billion people around the globe, introduce them to Jesus, and encourage them to become His true followers."

'Touch-a-Billion' and 'Impact-a-Nation' are CV's two strategies that all charitable activities fall into.

'Touch-a-Billion' focuses on using media platforms to introduce people to Jesus. Their main forms of communication include a mobile application, broadcast radio, social media, and internet media. One of these projects is yesheis, a mobile app that provides Christians with videos they can use to share their faith with friends.

'Impact-a-Nation' projects contribute to CV's vision through activities such as church pioneering and training local leaders with the intention of making a positive impact on society.

CV is based at Coleshill, Warwickshire, but has offices throughout Europe, CIS, Africa, North America, Latin America, and Asia Pacific.

It is registered charity under English law and, in 2007, had an endowment of £200 million, making it one of the 100 largest charities in the UK.
