= Grace Academy, Solihull =

Grace Academy Solihull
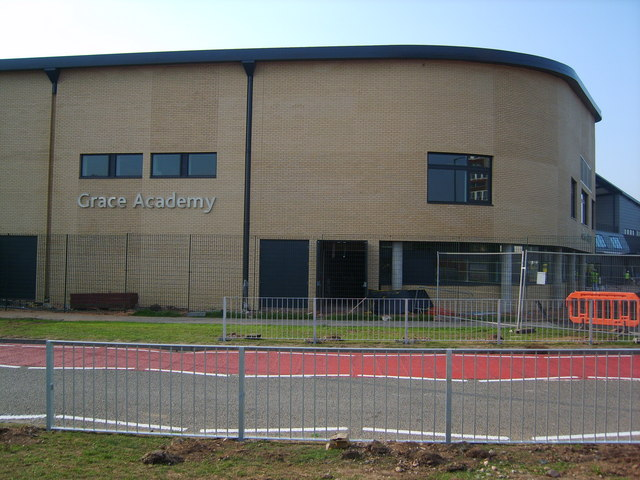

Location
- Chapelhouse Road, Chelmsley Wood; Solihull, West Midlands, B37 5JS; England; 52°28′28″N 1°45′10″W

Information
- Type: Academy
- Motto: "To develop well mannered, bright students with a sense of values..."
- Religious affiliation: Christian ethos
- Established: 2006
- Founder: Lord Bob Edmiston
- Specialist: Business and Enterprise
- Department for Education URN: 129342 Tables
- Ofsted: Reports
- Head teacher: Darren Gelder
- Gender: Coeducational
- Age: 11 to 20
- Enrolment: 1115
- Houses: Livingstone, Newton, Tyndale, Wilberforce
- Colours: Purple and gold (specifically against other academies, blue is used)
- Website: http://graceacademy.org.uk

Grace Academy Solihull is a non-selective co-educational secondary school within the English Academy programme, at Chelmsley Wood, Solihull, West Midlands.

It opened in 2006 and replaced the old Whitesmore School. It is a specialist Business and Enterprise college.

Grace Academy Solihull is constituted as a company and registered charity under English law.

In March 2017 the school was rated by Ofsted as Good, with an inspection in May 2022 stating that the academy continues to be a good school.

== See also ==
- Grace Academy (Coventry)
- Grace Academy (Darlaston)
- List of schools in Solihull
