= Solihull Metropolitan Borough Council elections =

Local government elections in Solihull, England

Solihull Metropolitan Borough Council elections are generally held three years out of every four, with a third of the council being elected each time. Solihull Metropolitan Borough Council is the local authority for the metropolitan borough of Solihull in the West Midlands, England. Since the last boundary changes in 2004, 51 councillors have been elected from 17 wards.

== Election results ==
Composition of the council
Year	Conservative	Reform UK	Labour	Liberal Democrats (Note: Includes totals for the predecessors of the Liberal Democrats, the Liberal Party and SDP (both of which participated in the Alliance).)	Green (Note: Includes totals for the predecessors of the Green Party of England and Wales, the Ecology Party and Green Party UK.)	UKIP	Independents & Others	Council control after election
Local government reorganisation; council established (51 seats)
1973	28	–	12	2	–	–	9	Conservative
1975	30	–	12	2	0	–	7	Conservative
1978	38	–	12	0	0	–	1	No overall control
1979	38	–	12	0	0	–	1	Conservative
1980	36	–	13	0	0	–	2	Conservative
1982	33	–	12	2	0	–	4	No overall control
1983	34	–	12	2	0	–	3	Conservative
1984	33	–	13	1	0	–	4	Conservative
1986	28	–	14	2	0	–	7	Conservative
1987	28	–	14	3	0	–	6	Conservative
1988	29	–	14	4	0	–	4	Conservative
1990	27	–	15	5	0	–	4	Conservative
1991	23	–	16	6	0	–	6	No overall control
1992	24	–	15	6	0	–	6	No overall control
1994	22	–	15	8	0	–	6	No overall control
1995	21	–	14	10	0	0	6	No overall control
1996	16	–	16	12	0	0	7	No overall control
1998	20	–	17	11	0	0	3	No overall control
1999	24	–	15	11	0	0	1	No overall control
2000	29	–	14	8	0	0	0	Conservative
2002	29	–	13	9	0	0	0	Conservative
2003	29	–	13	9	0	0	0	Conservative
New ward boundaries (51 seats)
2004	27	–	8	15	0	0	1	Conservative
2006	26	–	7	15	0	0	3 (Note: 2 Independents, 1 BNP)	Conservative
2007	24	–	7	17	0	0	3	No overall control
2008	26	–	5	18	1	0	1 (Note: 1 BNP)	Conservative
2010	23	–	7	18	0	0	3	No overall control
2011	29	–	6	12	3	0	1	Conservative
2012	28	–	6	11	5	0	1	Conservative
2014	29	–	2	8	9	1	2	Conservative
2015	32	–	1	6	9	2	1	Conservative
2016	32	–	1	6	10	2	0	Conservative
2018	33	–	2	4	11	0	0	Conservative
2019	27	–	3	8	14	0	1	Conservative
2021	30	–	2	3	15	0	1	Conservative
2022	28	–	0	5	14	0	4	Conservative
2023	29	–	0	6	13	0	3	Conservative
2024	30	–	1	8	10	0	2	Conservative
New ward boundaries (51 seats)
2026	24	17	0	6	4	0	0	No overall control

== Council elections ==
- 1973
- 1975
- 1976
- 1978
- 1979
- 1980
- 1982
- 1983
- 1984
- 1986
- 1987
- 1988
- 1990
- 1991
- 1992
- 1994
- 1995
- 1996
- 1998
- 1999
- 2000
- 2002
- 2003
- 2004 (new ward boundaries)
- 2006
- 2007
- 2008
- 2010
- 2011
- 2012
- 2014
- 2015
- 2016
- 2018
- 2019
- 2021
- 2022
- 2023
- 2024
- 2026

== Borough result maps ==
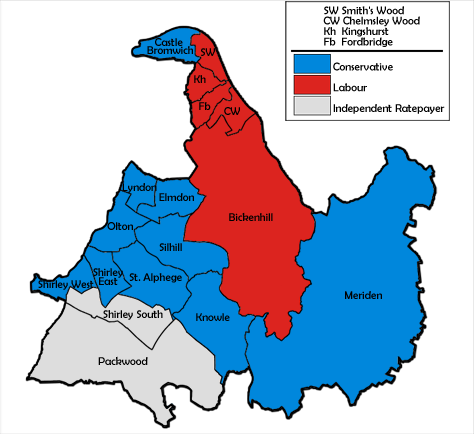
1984 results map

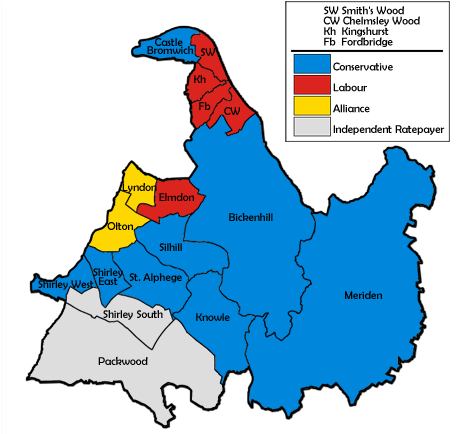
1986 results map

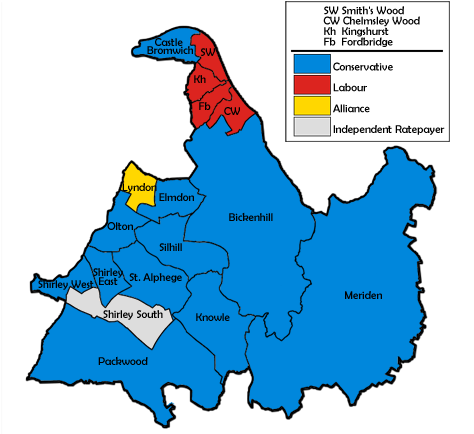
1987 results map

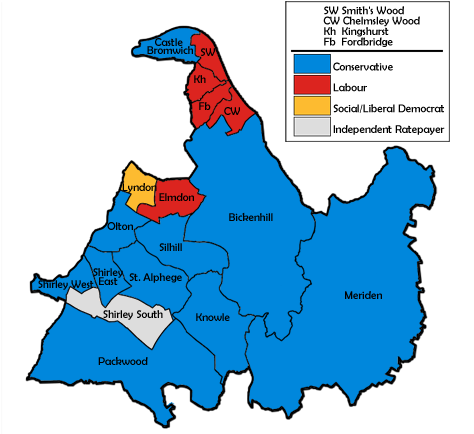
1988 results map

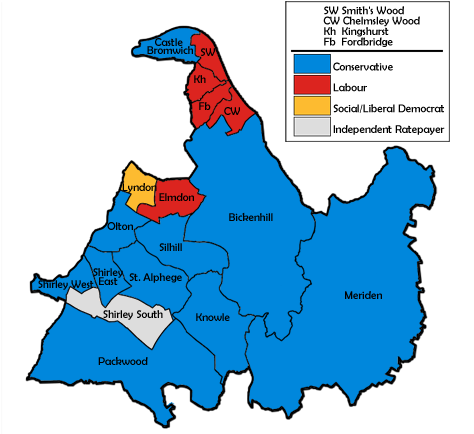
1988 results map

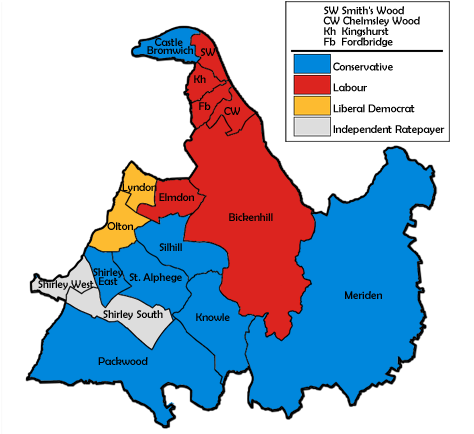
1990 results map

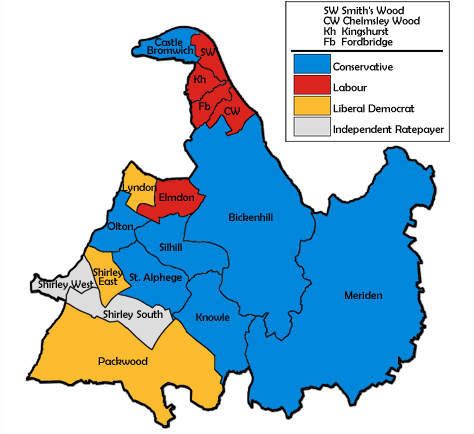
1991 results map

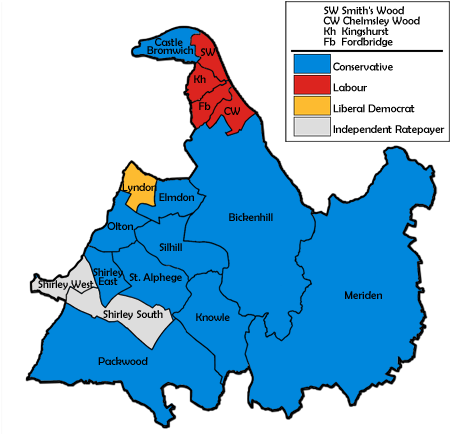
1992 results map

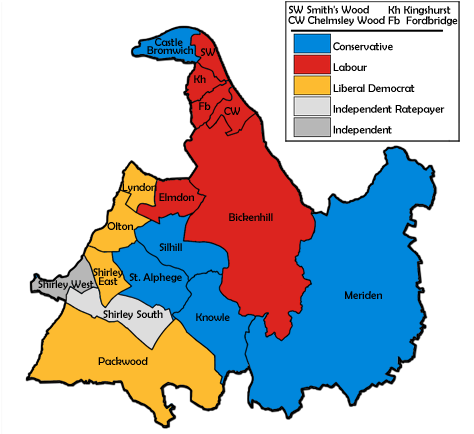
1994 results map

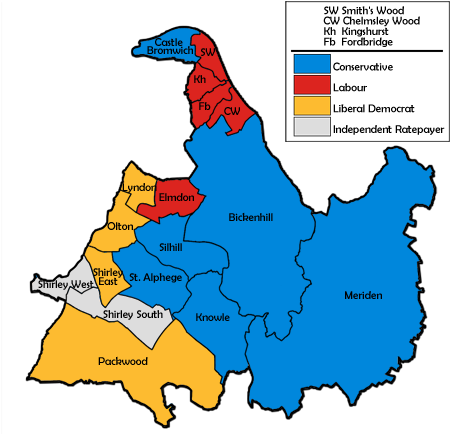
1995 results map

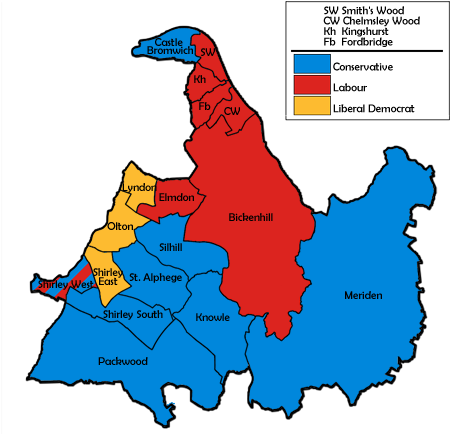
1998 results map

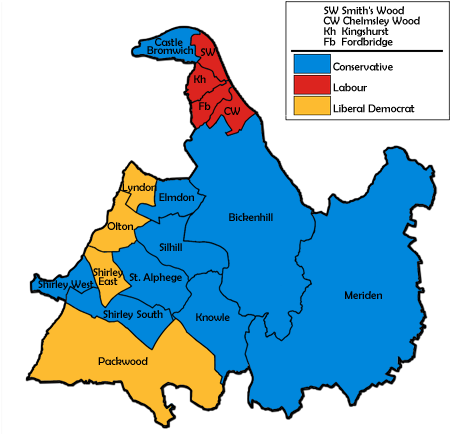
1999 results map

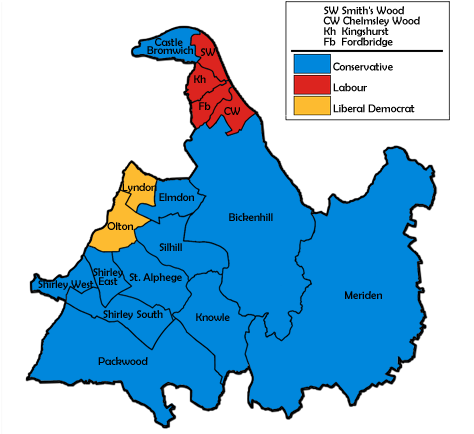
2000 results map

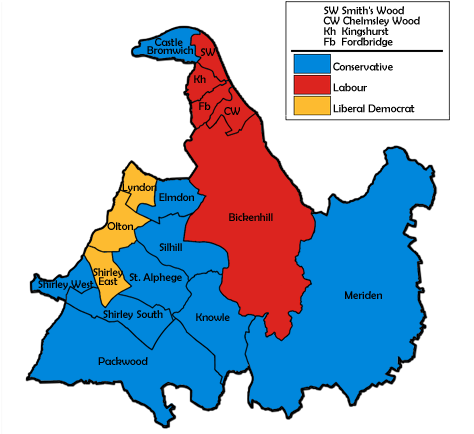
2002 results map

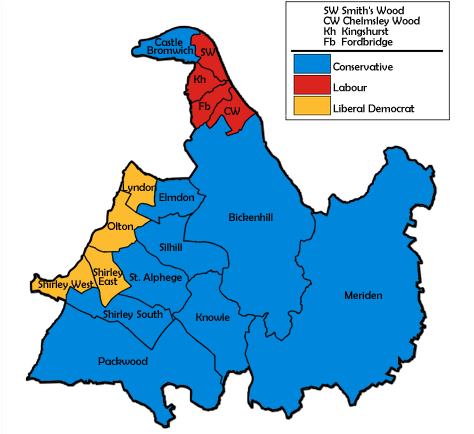
2003 results map

2004 results map

2006 results map

2007 results map

2008 results map

2010 results map

2011 results map

2012 results map

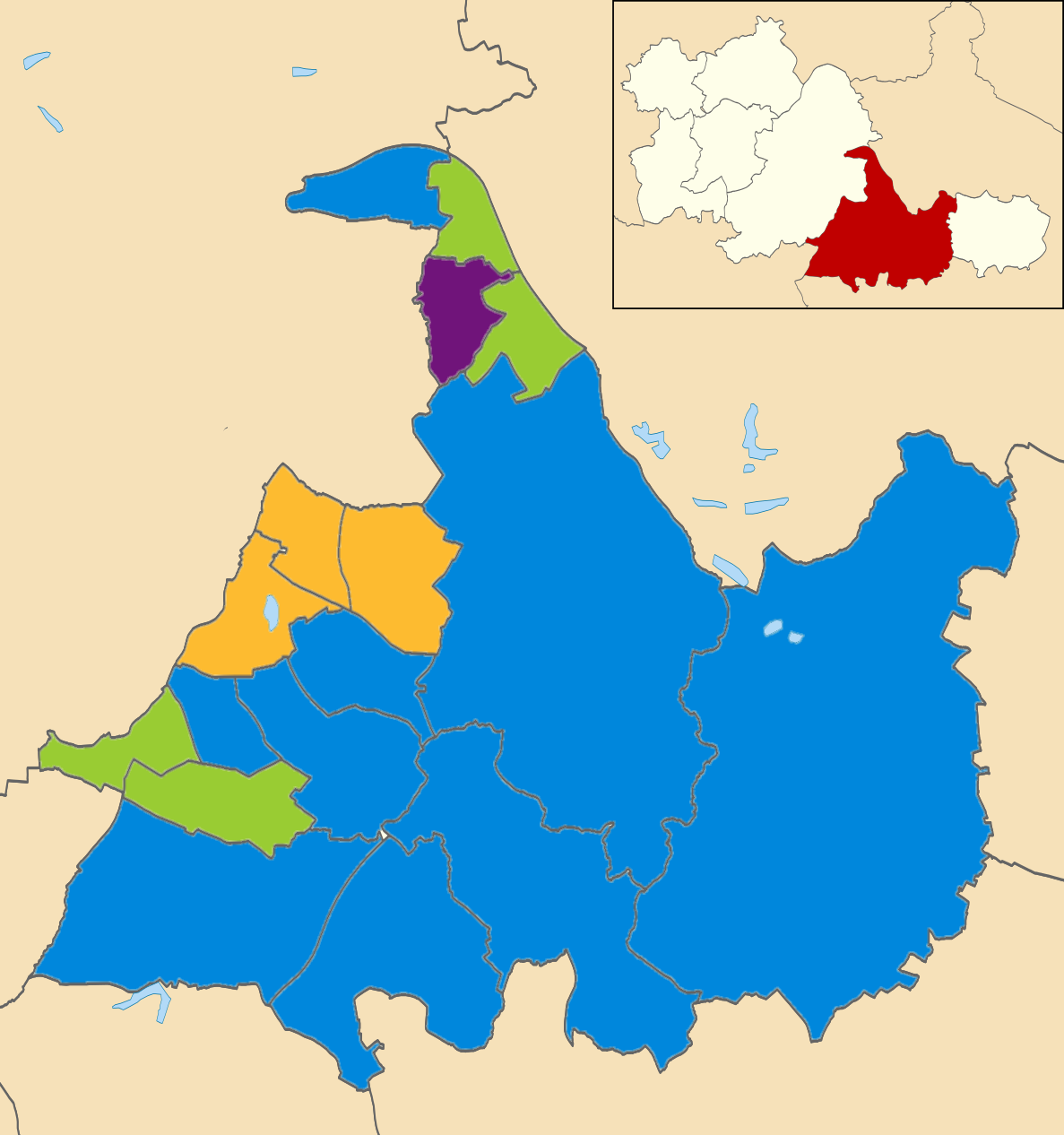
2014 results map

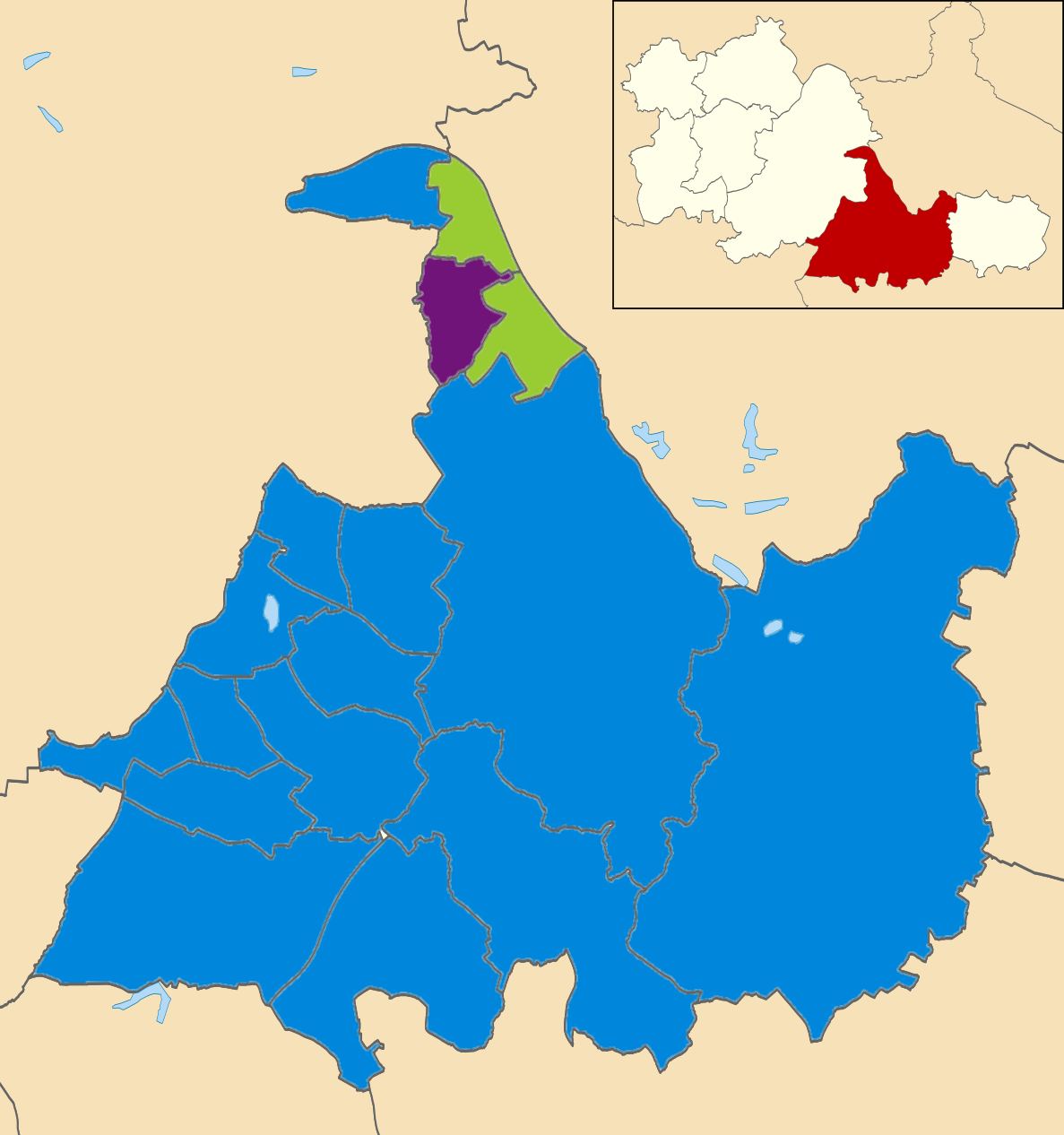
2015 results map

2016 results map

2018 results map

2019 results map

2021 results map

2022 results map

2023 results map

2024 results map

2026 results map

== By-election results ==
By-elections occur when seats become vacant between council elections. Below is a summary of the by-elections; full by-election results can be found by clicking on the by-election name.

By-election	Date	Incumbent party	Winning party
Shirley East by-election	2 February 1989	Conservative	SLD
Smith's Wood by-election	2 March 1989	Labour	Labour
Packwood by-election	April 1989	Independent Resident	SLD
Shirley West by-election	13 December 1990	Conservative	Independent Ratepayer
Castle Bromwich by-election	18 July 1996	Conservative	Conservative
Fordbridge by-election	24 October 1996	Labour	Labour
Kingshurst by-election	16 October 1997	Labour	Labour
Silhill by-election	16 October 1997	Conservative	Conservative
Shirley South by-election	16 July 1998	Independent Ratepayer	Conservative
Shirley East by-election	28 September 2000	Liberal Democrats	Conservative
Shirley West by-election	13 March 2003	Conservative	Liberal Democrats
St Alphege by-election	3 March 2005	Conservative	Conservative
Knowle by-election	15 September 2005	Conservative	Conservative
Olton by-election	20 January 2011	Liberal Democrats	Liberal Democrats
Blythe by-election	1 March 2018	Conservative	Conservative
