= 2016 Solihull Metropolitan Borough Council election =

2016 local election in England

- 5 May 2016

One third (17) seats to Solihull Metropolitan Borough City Council 26 seats needed for a majority
	First party	Second party	Third party
Party	Conservative	Green	Liberal Democrats
Seats won	32	10	6
Seat change	Steady	▲2	Steady
Popular vote	23,724	9,975	5,580
Percentage	47.71%	20.06%	11.22%
	Fourth party	Fifth party	Sixth party
Party	UKIP	Labour	Independent
Seats won	2	1	0
Seat change	Steady	Steady	▼1
Popular vote	2,080	6,963	1,387
Percentage	4.18%	14.00%	2.79%
	Seventh party
Party	SDP
Seats won	0
Seat change	▼1
Popular vote	17
Percentage	0.03%
Council control before election
Conservative
Council control after election
Conservative

(2015 ←) 2016 United Kingdom local elections (→ 2018)

2016 local election results in Solihull

The 2016 Solihull Metropolitan Borough Council election took place on 5 May 2016 to elect members of Solihull Metropolitan Borough Council in England. This was on the same day as other local elections.

The governing Conservative Party won 9 of the 17 seats up for election, gaining one from an independent and losing one to the Green Party. In addition to this seat, the Greens gained another from the SDP, that of a former Green Councillor who had defected in August 2015. They also held their two existing seats to solidify their position as the Official Opposition in Solihull. The Liberal Democrats held their three seats and Labour held their one, the only seat they hold in Solihull.

== Result ==
Solihull Council election result, 2016
Party	Seats	Gains	Losses	Net gain/loss	Seats %	Votes %	Votes	+/−
Conservative	9	▲1	▼1	Steady	52.9	47.7	23,724	▲4,162
Green	4	▲2	Steady	▲2	23.5	20.1	9,975	▲4,428
Liberal Democrats	3	Steady	Steady	Steady	17.7	11.2	5,580	▼3,515
Labour	1	Steady	Steady	Steady	5.9	14.0	6,963	▼1,112
UKIP	0	Steady	Steady	Steady	0	4.2	2,080	▲2,080
Independent	0	Steady	▼1	▼1	0	2.8	1,387	▲1,387
SDP	0	Steady	▼1	▼1	0	0.0	17	▲17
Totals	17						49,726	▲3,185

== Council Composition ==
Prior to the election, the composition of the council was:

↓
32	8	6	2	1	1	1
Conservative	Green	Lib Dem	UKIP	Lab	SDP	Ind

After the election, the composition of the council was:

↓
32	10	6	2	1
Conservative	Green	Lib Dem	UKIP	Lab

Lib Dem - Liberal Democrats
Lab - Labour
Ind - Independent

== Result by Ward ==
=== Bickenhill ===
Bickenhill
Party	Candidate	Votes	%	±%
Conservative	Jim Ryan	1,493	60.67	▲3.04
Labour	Mike Longfield	565	22.96	▲1.52
Green	Gary Macnaughton	403	16.38	▲3.05
Majority		928	37.71	▲4.57
Turnout		2,461		
Conservative hold		Swing		

=== Blythe ===
Blythe
Party	Candidate	Votes	%	±%
Conservative	Alex Insley	1,598	51.14	▲14.08
Independent	Linda Brown	1,048	33.54	▼9.37
Labour	Sardul Marwa	280	8.96	▼0.71
Green	Jo Hodgson	199	6.37	N/A
Majority		550	17.60	
Turnout		3,125		
Conservative gain from Independent		Swing		

=== Castle Bromwich ===
Castle Bromwich
Party	Candidate	Votes	%	±%
Conservative	Ted Richards	1,859	71.72	
Labour	Ian English	465	17.94	
Green	Cheryl Buxton-Sait	268	10.34	
Majority		1,394	53.78	
Turnout		2,592		
Conservative hold		Swing		

=== Chelmsley Wood ===
z

Chelmsley Wood
Party	Candidate	Votes	%	±%
Green	Chris Williams	1,652	75.16	
UKIP	Rosie Worsley	231	10.51	
Labour	Emma Chidler	224	10.19	
Conservative	Sally Bell	91	4.14	
Majority		1,421	64.65	
Turnout		2,198		
Green hold		Swing		

=== Dorridge and Hockley Heath ===
Dorridge and Hockley Heath
Party	Candidate	Votes	%	±%
Conservative	Ken Meeson	2,215	71.13	
Green	Iona McIntyre	322	10.34	
Labour	Elizabeth Thacker	289	9.28	
Liberal Democrats	Paul Fairburn	288	9.25	
Majority		1,893	60.79	
Turnout		3,114		
Conservative hold		Swing		

=== Elmdon ===
Elmdon
Party	Candidate	Votes	%	±%
Liberal Democrats	Glenis Slater	1,175	36.60	
Conservative	Michael Gough	1,120	34.89	
UKIP	David Faulkner	491	15.30	
Labour	Marcus Brain	328	10.21	
Green	Ashleigh Knibb	96	2.99	
Majority		55	1.71	
Turnout		3,210		
Liberal Democrats hold		Swing		

=== Kingshurst and Fordbridge ===
Kingshurst and Fordbridge
Party	Candidate	Votes	%	±%
Labour	Flo Nash	780	45.91	
UKIP	Sarah Evans	537	31.61	
Conservative	Max Barker	226	13.30	
Green	David Davies	116	6.83	
Majority		243	14.30	
Turnout		1,699		
Labour hold		Swing		

=== Knowle ===
Knowle
Party	Candidate	Votes	%	±%
Conservative	Jeff Potts	2,303	75.14	
Labour	Simon Johnson	387	12.63	
Green	Alison Gavin	375	12.23	
Majority		1,916	62.51	
Turnout		3,065		
Conservative hold		Swing		

=== Lyndon ===
Lyndon
Party	Candidate	Votes	%	±%
Liberal Democrats	Ade Adeyemo	1,060	36.39	
Conservative	Paul Thomas	901	30.93	
Labour	Martin Tolman	693	23.79	
Green	Elaine Williams	259	8.89	
Majority		159	5.46	
Turnout		2,913		
Liberal Democrats hold		Swing		

=== Meriden ===
Meriden
Party	Candidate	Votes	%	±%
Conservative	Tony Dicicco	1,891	59.75	
UKIP	Leslie Kaye	557	17.60	
Labour	Cathy Connan	498	15.73	
Green	Mark Pearson	219	6.92	
Majority		1,334	42.15	
Turnout		3,165		
Conservative hold		Swing		

=== Olton ===
Olton
Party	Candidate	Votes	%	±%
Liberal Democrats	Jo Fairburn	1,554	43.13	
Conservative	Wazma Qais	1,429	39.66	
Labour	Steve Gulati	388	10.77	
Green	Carol Linfield	232	6.44	
Majority		125	3.47	
Turnout		3,603		
Liberal Democrats hold		Swing		

=== Shirley East ===
Shirley East
Party	Candidate	Votes	%	±%
Conservative	Karen Grinsell	1,556	50.87	
Green	Howard Allen	859	28.08	
Labour	Kevin Raven	370	12.10	
Liberal Democrats	Peter Lee	274	8.96	
Majority		697	22.78	
Turnout		3,059		
Conservative hold		Swing		

=== Shirley South ===
Shirley South
Party	Candidate	Votes	%	±%
Green	Max Mcloughlin	1,587	42.51	
Conservative	Gary Allport	1,401	37.53	
Independent	Trevor Eames	339	9.08	
Labour	Shirley Young	247	6.62	
Liberal Democrats	Antony Rogers	159	4.26	
Majority		186	4.98	
Turnout		3,733		
Green gain from Conservative		Swing		

=== Shirley West ===
Shirley West
Party	Candidate	Votes	%	±%
Green	Maggie Allen	1,761	57.85	
Conservative	David Price	865	28.42	
Labour	Ray Brookes	302	9.92	
Liberal Democrats	Bradley Tucker	116	3.81	
Majority		896	29.43	
Turnout		3,044		
Green hold		Swing		

=== Silhill ===
Silhill
Party	Candidate	Votes	%	±%
Conservative	Peter Hogarth	2,147	65.80	
Liberal Democrats	Jan Mason	481	14.74	
Labour	Janet Marsh	406	12.44	
Green	Trevor Barker	229	7.02	
Majority		1,666	51.06	
Turnout		3,263		
Conservative hold		Swing		

=== Smith's Wood ===
Smith's Wood
Party	Candidate	Votes	%	±%
Green	Jean Hamilton	1,306	63.80	
Labour	David Cole	364	17.78	
UKIP	Gary Smith	264	12.90	
Conservative	Graham Juniper	96	4.69	
SDP	Mike Sheridan	17	0.83	
Majority		942	46.02	
Turnout		2,047		
Green gain from SDP		Swing		

=== St. Alphege ===
St. Alphege
Party	Candidate	Votes	%	±%
Conservative	Kate Wild	2,533	68.93	
Liberal Democrats	Martin Smith	473	12.87	
Labour	Paul Tuxworth	377	10.26	
Green	Maggie Ryan	292	7.95	
Majority		2,060	56.05	
Turnout		3,675		
Conservative hold		Swing		

== By-elections between 2016 and 2018 ==
Blythe by-election 1 March 2018
Party	Candidate	Votes	%	±%
Conservative	James Butler	1,252	75.9	▲24.8
Labour	Sardul Singh Marwa	224	13.6	▲4.6
Liberal Democrats	Charles Robinson	174	10.5	▲10.5
Majority		1,028	62.3	
Turnout		1,650		
Conservative hold		Swing		
