= 1986 Solihull Metropolitan Borough Council election =

1986 UK local government election

(1984 ←) 1986 United Kingdom local elections (→ 1987)

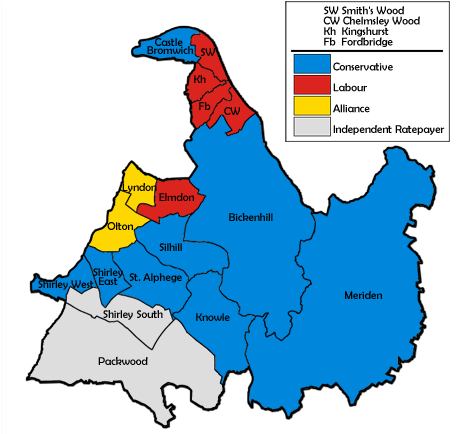
Map of the results for the 1986 Solihull council election.

The 1986 Solihull Metropolitan Borough Council elections were held on Thursday, 8 May 1986, with one third of the council to be elected. The Conservatives retained control of the council. Voter turnout was 34.6%.

== Election result ==
Solihull local election result 1986
Party	Seats	Gains	Losses	Net gain/loss	Seats %	Votes %	Votes	+/−
Conservative	8	0	4	-4	47.0	40.2	21,676	-8.2
Labour	5	1	0	+1	29.4	28.0	15,086	+0.5
Alliance	2	1	0	+1	11.8	23.4	12,641	+8.5
Independent Ratepayers & Residents	2	2	0	+2	11.8	8.3	4,503	+0.2
National Front	0	0	0	0	0.0	0.1	57	-0.0

This result had the following consequences for the total number of seats on the council after the elections:

Party	Previous council	New council
Conservatives	33	29
Labour	13	14
Independent Ratepayers & Residents	4	6
Alliance	1	2
Total	51	51
Working majority	15	7

== Ward results ==
Bickenhill
Party	Candidate	Votes	%	±%
Conservative	Peter Kellie	1,714	44.3	+3.0
Labour	Peter McLoughlin	1,458	37.7	−12.8
Alliance (Liberal)	David Moore	695	18.0	+11.4
Majority		256	6.6	−2.6
Turnout		3,867	39.5	−7.7
Conservative hold		Swing	+7.9	

Castle Bromwich
Party	Candidate	Votes	%	±%
Conservative	Gordon Roberts	1,847	49.2	−19.6
Labour	Robert Overton	1,048	27.9	−3.2
Alliance (SDP)	John Walker	856	22.8	+22.8
Majority		799	21.3	−16.4
Turnout		3,751	39.4	−0.3
Conservative hold		Swing	-8.2	

Chelmsley Wood
Party	Candidate	Votes	%	±%
Labour	William Shaw	1,508	63.4	−12.0
Conservative	Robin Draycott	453	19.1	−5.4
Alliance (Liberal)	Thomas Wrenn	416	17.5	+17.5
Majority		1,055	44.4	−6.6
Turnout		2,377	25.6	−2.5
Labour hold		Swing	-3.3	

Elmdon
Party	Candidate	Votes	%	±%
Labour	Johanne Spittle	1,610	43.5	+11.7
Conservative	Soad Hemming	1,290	34.8	−13.3
Alliance (SDP)	Timothy Parazmand	804	21.7	+1.6
Majority		320	8.6	−7.7
Turnout		3,704	41.4	+7.9
Labour gain from Conservative		Swing	+12.5	

Fordbridge
Party	Candidate	Votes	%	±%
Labour	Arthur Harper	1,513	81.5	+26.0
Conservative	Elizabeth Plaister	344	18.5	−3.7
Majority		1,169	62.9	+29.7
Turnout		1,857	24.2	−1.9
Labour hold		Swing	+14.9	

Kingshurst
Party	Candidate	Votes	%	±%
Labour	Ben Magee	1,648	70.2	+3.6
Conservative	Daphne Clehorn	701	29.8	−3.6
Majority		947	40.3	+7.1
Turnout		2,349	35.3	+1.0
Labour hold		Swing	+3.6	

Knowle
Party	Candidate	Votes	%	±%
Conservative	Geoffrey Wright	1,881	58.2	−8.0
Alliance	Jennifer Wright	1,102	34.1	+7.2
Labour	Geoffrey Owen	248	7.7	+0.8
Majority		779	24.1	−15.1
Turnout		3,231	36.6	−1.0
Conservative hold		Swing	-7.6	

Lyndon
Party	Candidate	Votes	%	±%
Alliance (Liberal)	Norman Chapple	1,416	46.1	+13.3
Conservative	Malcolm Holdsworth	916	29.8	−14.4
Labour	Walter Kinder	740	24.1	+1.1
Majority		500	16.3	+4.8
Turnout		3,072	36.6	−3.8
Alliance hold		Swing	+13.9	

Meriden
Party	Candidate	Votes	%	±%
Conservative	Grahame Boakes	1,639	46.7	−9.8
Alliance (SDP)	John Johnson	1,461	41.7	+7.0
Labour	Robert Davis	406	11.6	+2.8
Majority		178	5.1	−16.8
Turnout		3,506	41.7	+1.5
Conservative hold		Swing	-8.4	

Olton
Party	Candidate	Votes	%	±%
Alliance (Liberal)	John Windmill	1,636	46.6	+8.0
Conservative	Michael Goodwin	1,454	41.4	−10.3
Labour	Sylvia McKears	419	11.9	+2.3
Majority		182	5.2	−8.0
Turnout		3,509	36.2	−2.3
Alliance gain from Conservative		Swing	+9.2	

Packwood
Party	Candidate	Votes	%	±%
Independent Residents	Amanda Jenkinson	1,902	49.9	−0.0
Conservative	Miriam Harris	1,660	43.5	−1.7
Labour Co-op	Ian Jamieson	251	6.6	+1.8
Majority		242	6.3	+1.7
Turnout		3,813	40.5	−1.2
Independent Residents gain from Conservative		Swing	-0.8	

Shirley East
Party	Candidate	Votes	%	±%
Conservative	Richard Lewis	1,242	39.8	−14.2
Alliance (SDP)	Ernest Garwood	777	24.6	+24.6
Labour	Rona Miller	449	14.2	+0.4
Independent Residents & Ratepayers	Judith Foster	687	21.8	−10.8
Majority		465	14.7	−6.2
Turnout		3,155	32.3	−0.8
Conservative hold		Swing	-19.4	

Shirley South
Party	Candidate	Votes	%	±%
Independent Residents & Ratepayers	Anthony Ebden	1,914	51.6	+4.9
Conservative	Stephen Wadsworth	1,334	36.0	−4.2
Labour	Thomas Hayes	461	12.4	−0.7
Majority		580	15.6	+9.1
Turnout		3,709	33.1	+2.9
Independent Residents & Ratepayers gain from Conservative		Swing	+4.5	

Shirley West
Party	Candidate	Votes	%	±%
Conservative	Keith Samuels	1,146	38.9	−10.1
Alliance (Liberal)	John Reeve	1,095	37.2	+8.8
Labour	Margaret Brittan	649	22.0	+2.0
National Front	Norman Tomkinson	57	1.9	−0.6
Majority		51	1.7	−18.9
Turnout		2,947	30.2	+2.1
Conservative hold		Swing	-9.4	

Silhill
Party	Candidate	Votes	%	±%
Conservative	George Hill	1,633	48.4	−11.5
Alliance (SDP)	Peter Congdon	1,251	37.1	+9.6
Labour	Alfred Porter	489	14.5	+1.9
Majority		382	11.3	−21.1
Turnout		3,373	32.4	+0.2
Conservative hold		Swing	-10.5	

Smith's Wood
Party	Candidate	Votes	%	±%
Labour	Frederick Austin	2,009	79.4	+1.5
Conservative	Dorothy Wallace	520	20.6	−1.5
Majority		1,489	58.9	+2.9
Turnout		2,529	28.0	−1.0
Labour hold		Swing	+1.5	

St. Alphege
Party	Candidate	Votes	%	±%
Conservative	Fraser Mitchell	1,902	59.2	−10.2
Alliance	Karol Bard	1,132	35.2	+9.5
Labour	Maurice Jones	180	5.6	+0.7
Majority		770	24.0	−19.7
Turnout		3,214	34.6	−4.2
Conservative hold		Swing	-9.8	
