= 2026 Solihull Metropolitan Borough Council election =

2026 English local government election

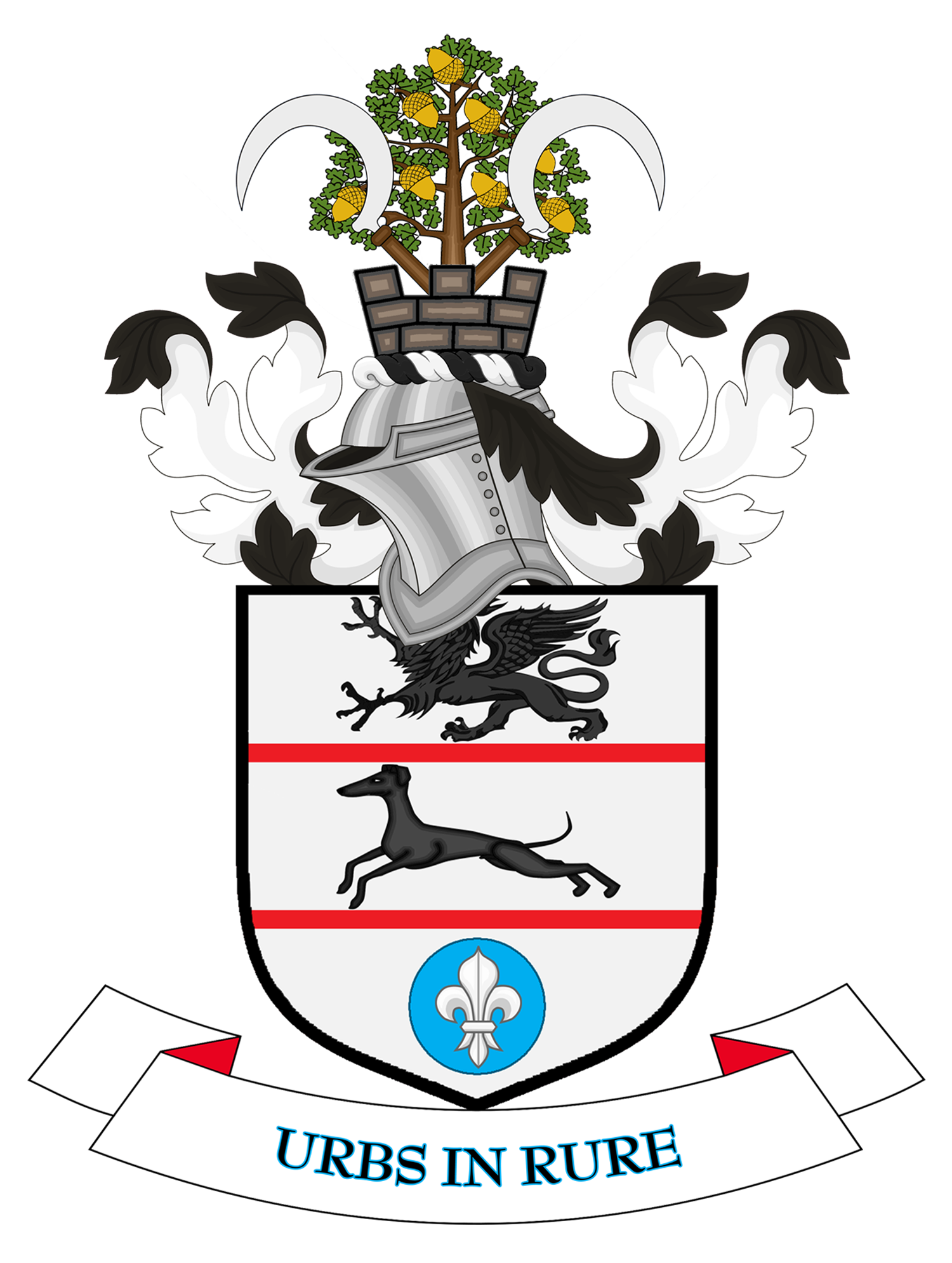
- 7 May 2026

All 51 seats to Solihull Metropolitan Borough Council 26 seats needed for a majority
- Registered: 164,572
- Turnout: 73,798; 44.8%
	First party	Second party	Third party
Leader	Karen Grinsell	Michael Gough	Ade Adeyemo
Party	Conservative	Reform	Liberal Democrats
Last election	30 seats, 50.5%	Did not stand	8 seats, 14.2%
Seats before	27	4	8
Seats won	24	17	6
Seat change	▼3	▲13	▼2
Popular vote	74,531	66,303	22,986
Percentage	35.5%	31.5%	10.9%
Swing	▼15.0pp	N/A	▼3.3pp
	Fourth party	Fifth party	Sixth party
Leader	Max McLoughlin	Hazel Dawkins
Party	Green	Labour	Independent
Last election	10 seats, 16.1%	1 seat, 18.7%	2 seats, 0.3%
Seats before	8	1	3
Seats won	4	0	0
Seat change	▼4	▼1	▼3
Popular vote	32,611	13,458	318
Percentage	15.5%	6.4%	0.2%
Swing	▼0.6pp	▼12.3pp	▼0.1pp
- Winner of each seat at the 2026 Solihull Metropolitan Borough Council
Leader before election
Karen Grinsell
Conservative
Leader after election
Karen Grinsell
Conservative
No overall control (Note: Conservative minority)

The 2026 Solihull Metropolitan Borough Council election took place on 7 May 2026 to elect members of Solihull Metropolitan Borough Council in West Midlands, England, coinciding with other local elections.

Prior to the election the council was under Conservative majority control. The council went under no overall control at the election. The Conservatives remained the largest party, but fell two seats short of a majority. They subsequently formed a minority administration to run the council. The incumbent Conservative leader of the council, Karen Grinsell, was reappointed to the role at the subsequent annual council meeting on 26 May 2026.

== Background ==
In 2024, Conservatives retained control of the council. During the term, four Conservative councillors left the party to formed an independent group, of which three defected to Reform UK later on, In February, another Conservative councillor from the Shirley West ward defected to Reform UK.

In 2026, all 51 seats in the council across seventeen wards will be up for election due to ward boundary changes. Several senior Conservative councillors, including former leader of the council Ian Courts, did not stand for re-election in 2026. None of the three independent councillors prior to the election stood for re-election.

== Election result ==
Council composition after the 2024 election

Council composition after the 2026 election

2026 Solihull Metropolitan Borough Council election
Party	Candidates	Seats	Gains	Losses	Net gain/loss	Seats %	Votes %	Votes	+/−
Conservative	51	24	N/A	N/A	▼3	47.1	35.5	74,531	–15.0
Reform	51	17	N/A	N/A	▲13	33.3	31.5	66,303	N/A
Liberal Democrats	33	6	N/A	N/A	▼2	11.8	10.9	22,986	–3.3
Green	42	4	N/A	N/A	▼4	7.8	15.5	32,611	–0.6
Labour	51	0	N/A	N/A	▼1	0.0	6.4	13,458	–12.3
Independent	2	0	N/A	N/A	▼3	0.0	0.2	318	–0.1

== Ward results ==
=== Balsall & Berkswell ===
Balsall & Berkswell (3 seats)
Party	Candidate	Votes	%
Conservative	Heather Delaney*	2,164	63.6
Conservative	Tony Dicicco*	1,945	57.1
Conservative	Terry Baker	1,797	52.8
Reform	Garry Taylor	788	23.1
Reform	Steve Thompson	757	22.2
Reform	TJ Desai	685	20.1
Liberal Democrats	Bob Carleton	594	17.4
Green	Trevor Barker	550	16.2
Labour	Margaret Brittin	362	10.6
Labour	Anna Gretton	344	10.1
Labour	Matthew Stephens	229	6.7
Turnout		3,661	49.3
Registered electors		7,420	
Conservative win (new seat)			
Conservative win (new seat)			
Conservative win (new seat)			

=== Blythe ===
Blythe (3 seats)
Party	Candidate	Votes	%	±%
Conservative	Keith Green*	1,614	46.1	–14.1
Conservative	Richard Holt*	1,576	45.0	–15.2
Conservative	Simon Coles	1,489	42.5	–17.7
Reform	Mark Evans	1,145	32.7	N/A
Reform	Jamie Walker	1,113	31.8	N/A
Reform	Dermot Reid	1,098	31.4	N/A
Green	Vijay Inamdar	646	18.4	+8.4
Liberal Democrats	James Oliver	410	11.7	+4.3
Liberal Democrats	John Galpin	389	11.1	+3.7
Labour	Teresa Corr	383	10.9	–11.5
Labour	Kam Chouhdry	335	9.6	–12.8
Labour	Craig Fergusson	309	8.8	–13.8
Turnout		3,758	43.7	
Registered electors		8,595		
Conservative hold				
Conservative hold				
Conservative hold				

=== Castle Bromwich ===
Castle Bromwich (3 seats)
Party	Candidate	Votes	%	±%
Reform	Alan Feeney*	2,376	61.3	N/A
Reform	Jamie Campbell	2,181	56.2	N/A
Reform	Chris Whelan	2,089	53.9	N/A
Conservative	Martin McCarthy*	1,097	28.3	–32.3
Conservative	Bernie Donnelly	1,066	27.5	–33.1
Conservative	Leslie Kaye*	1,053	27.2	–33.4
Green	Antony Lowe	538	13.9	+1.0
Labour	Kashif Ahmed	360	9.3	–13.6
Labour	Lee Dicken	342	8.8	–14.1
Labour	Samuel Eathorne	315	8.1	–14.8
Liberal Democrats	Peter Lee	217	5.6	+2.1
Turnout		4,283	45.8	
Registered electors		9,362		
Reform hold				
Reform gain from Conservative				
Reform gain from Conservative				

=== Chelmsley Wood ===
Chelmsley Wood (3 seats)
Party	Candidate	Votes	%	±%
Reform	Ian Brown	1,346	53.2	N/A
Reform	Michael James	1,279		N/A
Reform	Phil Tierney	1,264		N/A
Green	Shesh Sheshabhatter*	812	32.0	–24.9
Green	April Halpin	771		–26.6
Green	Andy Miller	753		–27.3
Conservative	Jim Cooper	214	7.8	–7.5
Conservative	John Courtenay	190		–8.5
Labour	Sally Farrell	190	6.2	–14.7
Conservative	Martin Tomlinson	165		–9.5
Labour	Elizabeth Thacker	148		–16.4
Labour	Lydia Turner	114		–17.8
Liberal Democrats	Glenis Slater	64	0.9	–0.4
Turnout		2,536	28.3	
Registered electors		8,966		
Reform win (new seat)				
Reform win (new seat)				
Reform win (new seat)				

=== Dorridge & Hockley Heath ===
Dorridge & Hockley Heath (3 seats)
Party	Candidate	Votes	%	±%
Conservative	Sally Tomlinson*	2,940	58.1	–5.7
Conservative	Andy Mackiewicz*	2,842	56.2	–7.6
Conservative	Paul Whitehouse	2,503	49.5	–14.3
Green	Kirsty Mackinlay	969	19.2	+3.5
Reform	Alex Insley	962	19.0	N/A
Reform	Cameron Hall	950	18.8	N/A
Reform	Simon Turner	905	17.9	N/A
Green	Peter Sylvester	858	17.0	+1.3
Green	James Leah	806	15.9	+0.2
Liberal Democrats	David Godfrey	352	7.0	+1.6
Liberal Democrats	Christopher Johnson	275	5.4	±0.0
Labour	Tess Green	242	4.8	–10.3
Labour	David Brittin	236	4.7	–10.4
Labour	James Tisley	188	3.7	–11.4
Independent	Luke Edwards	149	2.9	N/A
Turnout		5,196	57.3	
Registered electors		9,074		
Conservative hold				
Conservative hold				
Conservative hold				

=== Elmdon ===
Elmdon (3 seats)
Party	Candidate	Votes	%	±%
Liberal Democrats	Laura McCarthy*	1,585	39.0	–0.4
Reform	Eleonora Gough	1,498	36.9	N/A
Reform	Robert Johnson	1,475	36.3	N/A
Reform	Michael Welsh	1,360	33.5	N/A
Liberal Democrats	Kate Jones*	1,330	32.7	–6.7
Liberal Democrats	Michael Ward	1,244	30.6	–8.8
Conservative	Sandra Green	791	19.5	–18.1
Conservative	Georgina Hartland	749	18.4	–19.2
Conservative	Pav Matharu	635	15.6	–22.0
Green	Stephen Holt	345	8.5	+4.0
Green	Seren Jones	312	7.7	+3.2
Green	Richard Marshall	294	7.2	+2.7
Labour	Ian English	206	5.1	–10.0
Labour	Rachel Bradburne	201	4.9	–10.2
Labour	Paul Maguire	166	4.1	–11.0
Turnout		4,209	44.9	
Registered electors		9,373		
Liberal Democrats hold				
Reform gain from Liberal Democrats				
Reform gain from Liberal Democrats				

=== Fordbridge ===
Fordbridge (3 seats)
Party	Candidate	Votes	%
Reform	Paul Goldingay	1,452	61.9
Reform	Samantha Gethen	1,449	61.7
Reform	Den O'Neil	1,326	56.5
Conservative	David Cole*	470	20.0
Green	Henry Bodle	437	18.6
Green	Sam Flint	416	17.7
Conservative	Jacob Beardmore	361	15.4
Conservative	Kamren Grant	340	14.5
Labour	Jackie Moore	247	10.5
Labour	Ken Harrop	219	9.3
Labour	Antony Sangha	176	7.5
Liberal Democrats	Tony Ludlow	149	6.3
Turnout		2,612	28.5
Registered electors		9,167	
Reform win (new seat)			
Reform win (new seat)			
Reform win (new seat)			

=== Kingshurst & Smith's Wood ===
Kingshurst & Smith's Wood (3 seats)
Party	Candidate	Votes	%
Reform	Collette Brown	1,590	50.6
Reform	Lisa Taylor	1,570	
Reform	Adrian Stefanovici	1,534	
Green	Jean Hamilton*	1,061	32.4
Green	Dee Boyce	980	
Green	Mark Wilson*	960	
Conservative	Georgia Peplow	279	8.3
Conservative	Ethan Potter	274	
Labour	Sarah Alan	257	7.7
Labour	Mark Caddick	250	
Conservative	Sarah Young	219	
Labour	Hazel Dawkins*	210	
Liberal Democrats	Katherine Foy	91	1.0
Turnout		3,229	28.4
Registered electors		11,389	
Reform win (new seat)			
Reform win (new seat)			
Reform win (new seat)			

=== Knowle ===
Knowle (3 seats)
Party	Candidate	Votes	%	±%
Conservative	Dave Pinwell*	2,678	60.1	–7.1
Conservative	Yvonne Clements	2,667	59.9	–7.3
Conservative	Edward Fitter*	2,508	56.3	–10.9
Reform	John Dillon	951	21.4	N/A
Reform	Roy England	907	20.4	N/A
Reform	Steven Egan	900	20.2	N/A
Green	Amy Donohoe-Brown	541	12.1	+2.0
Green	Katy Moxley	493	11.1	+1.0
Green	Roger Halford	424	9.5	–0.6
Liberal Democrats	Lionel King	384	8.6	+1.6
Liberal Democrats	Matt Purssell	269	6.0	–1.0
Labour	Janet Hall	254	5.7	–10.0
Labour	James McLoughlin	212	4.8	–10.9
Labour	Zachary Stanier	174	3.9	–11.8
Turnout		4,628	55.2	
Registered electors		8,385		
Conservative hold				
Conservative hold				
Conservative hold				

=== Lyndon ===
Lyndon (3 seats)
Party	Candidate	Votes	%	±%
Liberal Democrats	Ade Adeyemo*	1,803	44.8	+8.7
Liberal Democrats	Kathryn Thomas*	1,548	38.5	+2.4
Liberal Democrats	Paul McCabe	1,421	35.3	–0.8
Reform	Mason Beirne	1,379	34.3	N/A
Reform	Marie Hawkeswood	1,294	32.1	N/A
Reform	Sunanda Sharma	1,118	27.8	N/A
Conservative	Kim Dodd	611	15.2	–24.6
Green	David Appleby	501	12.4	+6.7
Conservative	Danyal Rana	476	11.8	–28.0
Conservative	Paula Yates	455	11.3	–28.5
Green	Jackie Staite	427	10.6	+4.9
Green	Marius Pui	371	9.2	+3.5
Labour	Thomas Gilmore	243	6.0	–11.0
Labour	Susan Morris	229	5.7	–11.3
Labour	Nour Norris OBE	201	5.0	–12.0
Turnout		4,182	41.3	
Registered electors		10,122		
Liberal Democrats hold				
Liberal Democrats hold				
Liberal Democrats gain from Conservative				

=== Meriden & Arden ===
Meriden & Arden (3 seats)
Party	Candidate	Votes	%
Reform	David Hoey	1,432	38.9
Conservative	Catherine Price	1,425	38.7
Conservative	Jane Lamden*	1,418	38.5
Conservative	Ciaran O'Neill	1,392	37.8
Reform	Claire Kelly	1,378	37.4
Reform	Jacqueline Howse	1,364	37.0
Green	Paul Day	533	14.5
Green	Thomas McElholm	424	11.5
Green	Akin Kog	402	10.9
Labour	Bob Ryder	295	8.0
Liberal Democrats	Zachary Jones	269	7.3
Labour	Nosheen Naqvi	255	6.9
Labour	Phil Simister	246	6.7
Liberal Democrats	Matt Powell	217	5.9
Turnout		3,848	44.8
Registered electors		8,585	
Reform win (new seat)			
Conservative win (new seat)			
Conservative win (new seat)			

=== Olton ===
Olton (3 seats)
Party	Candidate	Votes	%	±%
Liberal Democrats	James Bradley*	1,814	35.9	–8.3
Liberal Democrats	Michael Carthew*	1,714	33.9	–10.3
Conservative	James Johnson	1,669	33.0	–6.1
Conservative	Lachhman Bhambra	1,576	31.2	–7.9
Conservative	Wasim Zaman	1,349	26.7	–12.4
Liberal Democrats	Richard Evans	1,323	26.2	–18.0
Reform	Peter Dixon	1,142	22.6	N/A
Reform	Simon Hawker	1,069	21.2	N/A
Reform	James Murray	1,034	20.5	N/A
Green	Jane Holt	601	11.9	+6.1
Green	David James	468	9.3	+3.5
Green	Easwar Vivekanandan	433	8.6	+2.8
Labour	Jonathan Berg	342	6.8	–4.2
Labour	Sarah Shah	231	4.6	–6.4
Labour	Ian Jamieson	220	4.4	–6.6
Independent	Karima Chaouch	169	3.3	N/A
Turnout		5,253	50.4	
Registered electors		10,420		
Liberal Democrats hold				
Liberal Democrats hold				
Conservative gain from Liberal Democrats				

=== Shirley East & Sharmans Cross ===
Shirley East & Sharmans Cross (3 seats)
Party	Candidate	Votes	%
Conservative	Karen Grinsell*	2,748	52.7
Conservative	Annette Mackenzie*	2,639	50.6
Conservative	Mark Parker*	2,485	47.7
Reform	Peter Byrne	1,118	21.5
Reform	Jane Paradine	993	19.1
Reform	Richard Whitehouse	973	18.7
Green	Srini Eaga	883	16.9
Green	Mark Pearson	848	16.3
Green	Kushi Maddikunta	760	14.6
Liberal Democrats	Roger Gemmell	559	10.7
Liberal Democrats	Charles Robinson	549	10.5
Labour	Gerard Dufficy	416	8.0
Labour	Anthony Howe	360	6.9
Labour	Afzal Mirza	300	5.8
Turnout		5,455	49.9
Registered electors		10,928	
Conservative win (new seat)			
Conservative win (new seat)			
Conservative win (new seat)			

=== Shirley South ===
Shirley South (3 seats)
Party	Candidate	Votes	%	±%
Green	Max McLoughlin*	1,895	40.0	▼10.3
Green	Shahin Ashraf*	1,806	38.1	▼12.2
Green	Alan Wigley	1,689	35.6	▼14.7
Reform	Stewart Blunt	1,436	30.3	N/A
Reform	Christopher Dean	1,375	29.0	N/A
Conservative	Simon Burke	1,329	28.0	▼5.5
Reform	Daniel Morris	1,300	27.4	N/A
Conservative	Howards Nichols	1,226	25.9	▼7.6
Conservative	Dipesh Chauhan	1,128	23.8	▼9.7
Liberal Democrats	Jane Carthew	259	5.5	▲2.1
Labour	Joanne Brown	235	5.0	▼7.7
Liberal Democrats	Jill Ketley	204	4.3	▲0.9
Labour	Stuart Hedley	168	3.5	▼9.2
Labour	Kevin Raven	168	3.5	▼9.2
Turnout		4,947	47.7	
Registered electors		10,362		
Green hold				
Green hold				
Green gain from Independent				

=== Shirley West ===
Shirley West (3 seats)
Party	Candidate	Votes	%	±%
Reform	Prish Sharma*	1,829	36.6	N/A
Reform	Sharon O'Connor	1,725	34.5	N/A
Green	Alison Wilson*	1,691	33.8	▲2.9
Green	Steve Cauldwell	1,677	33.6	▲2.7
Green	Ben Groom*	1,614	32.3	▲1.4
Reform	Michael Wright	1,611	32.2	N/A
Conservative	Chris Smith	1,294	25.9	▼16.0
Conservative	Manjit Singh	1,237	24.8	▼17.1
Conservative	Annette Wilcox	1,154	23.1	▼18.8
Labour	Sheila Brookes	284	5.7	▼12.1
Liberal Democrats	Frank Dawson	231	4.6	▼0.2
Liberal Democrats	John Carthew	225	4.5	▼0.3
Labour	Ann Littley	217	4.3	▼13.5
Labour	Peter Trigg	198	4.0	▼13.8
Turnout		5,219	46.3	
Registered electors		11,275		
Reform hold				
Reform gain from Green				
Green hold				

=== Silhill ===
Silhill (3 seats)
Party	Candidate	Votes	%	±%
Conservative	Josh O'Nyons*	2,226	44.0	+2.1
Conservative	Hitesh Bikumalla	2,209	43.7	+1.8
Conservative	Wazma Qais*	1,963	38.8	–3.1
Reform	Michael Gough*	1,427	28.2	N/A
Reform	Paul Thompson	1,254	24.8	N/A
Reform	Bhavan Pemmaiah	1,140	22.5	N/A
Liberal Democrats	Nicola Cadet de Fontenay	763	15.1	+10.3
Liberal Democrats	Gayle Monk	676	13.4	+8.6
Green	James Henry	661	13.1	–17.8
Green	Emma Marshall	648	12.8	–18.1
Liberal Democrats	Terry Whitehead	643	12.7	N/A
Green	Rosemary Sexton	594	11.7	–19.2
Labour	Janet Marsh	376	7.4	–10.4
Labour	Nick Stephens	326	6.4	–11.4
Labour	Patsy Stone	264	5.2	–12.6
Turnout		5,329	49.9	
Registered electors		10,685		
Conservative hold				
Conservative gain from Reform				
Conservative hold				

=== St Alphege with Monkspath & Hillfield ===
St Alphege with Monkspath & Hillfield (3 seats)
Party	Candidate	Votes	%
Conservative	Ken Hawkins	2,939	58.0
Conservative	Bob Grinsell*	2,565	50.6
Conservative	Sardul Marwa*	2,392	47.2
Reform	Patricia Berry	1,415	27.9
Reform	Peter Harwood	1,300	25.6
Reform	Angela Sandison	1,247	24.6
Liberal Democrats	Mark Geary	807	15.9
Green	Brian Hunter	719	14.2
Liberal Democrats	John Wyatt	608	12.0
Labour	Noel Grace	527	10.4
Labour	Angela Kikugawa	410	8.1
Labour	Paul Tuxworth	278	5.5
Turnout		5,453	52.1
Registered electors		10,464	
Conservative win (new seat)			
Conservative win (new seat)			
Conservative win (new seat)			

== Opinion Polls ==
Date(s) conducted	Provider	Area	Lab	Con	LD	Grn	Ref	Others
March-April 2026	YouGov	West Midlands	10%	26%	16%	17%	31%	0%
March-April 2026	Telegraph/JL Partners	England	12.3%	34.5%	14.9%	7.9%	27.4%	3.1%
5 May 2022	2022 local elections	–	18.7%	50.5%	14.2%	16.1%	–	0.3%

== Post-election changes ==
=== Castle Bromwich by-election ===
Castle Bromwich by-election: 26 November 2026
Party	Candidate	Votes	%	±%
Labour	Kashif Ahmed			
Independent	Qasim Ali			
Independent	Elliott Astley			
Green	Dee Boyce			
Liberal Democrats	Bob Carleton			
Restore	Michael Craven			
Labour	Hazel Dawkins			
Reform	Mark Evans			
Labour	Tom Gilmore			
Independent	Michael Gough			
Conservative	Georgina Hartland			
Reform	Jacqueline Howse			
Liberal Democrats	Christopher Johnson			
Conservative	Martin McCarthy			
Independent	Bhavan Pemmaiah			
Conservative	Ethan Potter			
Liberal Democrats	Matt Purssell			
Green	Shesh Sheshabhattar			
Reform	Garry Taylor			
Independent	Paul Thompson			
Green	Mark Wilson			
Turnout				
hold				
hold				
hold				
