= 1987 Solihull Metropolitan Borough Council election =

1987 UK local government election

(1986 ←) 1987 United Kingdom local elections (→ 1988)

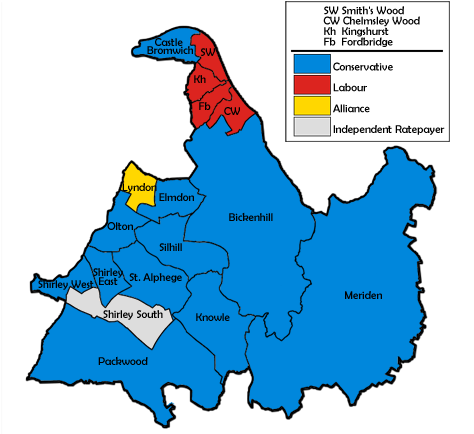
Map of the results for the 1987 Solihull council election.

The 1987 Solihull Metropolitan Borough Council elections were held on Thursday, 7 May 1987, with one third of the council to be elected. The Conservatives retained control of the council. Voter turnout was 43.2%

== Election result ==
Solihull local election result 1987
Party	Seats	Gains	Losses	Net gain/loss	Seats %	Votes %	Votes	+/−
Conservative	11	1	1	0	64.7	51.0	34,504	+10.8
Labour	4	0	0	0	23.5	17.9	12,130	-10.1
Alliance	1	1	0	+1	5.9	22.8	15,412	-0.6
Independent Ratepayers & Residents	1	0	1	-1	5.9	8.1	5,499	-0.2
National Front	0	0	0	0	0.0	0.1	60	-0.0

This result had the following consequences for the total number of seats on the council after the elections:

Party	Previous council	New council
Conservatives	29	29
Labour	14	14
Independent Ratepayers & Residents	6	5
Alliance	2	3
Total	51	51
Working majority	7	7

== Ward results ==
Bickenhill
Party	Candidate	Votes	%	±%
Conservative	Mary Dingley	2,605	55.1	+10.7
Labour	Peter McLoughlin	1,342	28.4	−9.3
Alliance (Liberal)	David Moore	784	16.6	−1.4
Majority		1,263	26.7	+20.1
Turnout		4,731	47.1	+7.6
Conservative hold		Swing	+10.0	

Castle Bromwich
Party	Candidate	Votes	%	±%
Conservative	David Rees	2,886	64.5	+15.2
Alliance (SDP)	John Walker	827	18.5	−4.3
Labour	Robert Overton	763	17.0	−10.9
Majority		2,059	46.0	+24.7
Turnout		4,476	46.4	+7.0
Conservative hold		Swing	+9.8	

Chelmsley Wood
Party	Candidate	Votes	%	±%
Labour	Nicholas Stephens	1,461	51.5	−12.0
Conservative	Robin Draycott	789	27.8	+8.7
Alliance (Liberal)	Thomas Wrenn	529	18.6	+1.1
National Front	Norman Tomkinson	60	2.1	+2.1
Majority		672	23.7	−20.7
Turnout		2,839	31.3	+5.7
Labour hold		Swing	-10.3	

Elmdon
Party	Candidate	Votes	%	±%
Conservative	Geoffrey Wood	2,107	48.8	+14.0
Labour	Rona Miller	1,371	31.8	−11.7
Alliance (Liberal)	Richard Blight	837	19.4	−2.3
Majority		736	17.1	+8.5
Turnout		4,315	48.4	+7.0
Conservative hold		Swing	+12.8	

Fordbridge
Party	Candidate	Votes	%	±%
Labour	Angela Reid	1,150	52.7	−28.8
Conservative	Elizabeth Plaister	643	29.4	+10.9
Alliance (SDP)	Bernadette Pruden	390	17.9	+17.9
Majority		507	23.3	−39.7
Turnout		2,183	28.9	+4.7
Labour hold		Swing	-19.9	

Kingshurst
Party	Candidate	Votes	%	±%
Labour	David Threlkeld	1,362	52.5	−17.6
Conservative	Daphne Cleghorn	843	32.5	+2.7
Alliance (SDP)	Mark Akhurst	387	14.9	+14.9
Majority		519	20.0	−20.3
Turnout		2,592	41.6	+6.3
Labour hold		Swing	-10.1	

Knowle
Party	Candidate	Votes	%	±%
Conservative	Thomas Morrison	2,726	66.6	+8.4
Alliance	Jennifer Wright	1,182	28.9	−5.2
Labour	Maurice Livingstone	183	4.5	−3.2
Majority		1,544	37.7	+13.6
Turnout		4,091	46.1	+9.5
Conservative hold		Swing	+6.8	

Lyndon
Party	Candidate	Votes	%	±%
Alliance (Liberal)	Ian Gillett	1,648	43.5	−2.6
Conservative	David Wilkes	1,584	41.8	+12.0
Labour	Walter Kinder	559	14.7	−9.3
Majority		64	1.7	−14.6
Turnout		3,791	44.6	+8.0
Alliance gain from Conservative		Swing	-7.3	

Meriden
Party	Candidate	Votes	%	±%
Conservative	Robert Meacham	2,411	56.8	+10.1
Alliance (SDP)	John Johnson	1,655	39.0	−2.7
Labour	Eveline Benton	176	4.1	−7.4
Majority		756	17.8	+12.7
Turnout		4,242	50.1	+8.4
Conservative hold		Swing	+6.4	

Olton
Party	Candidate	Votes	%	±%
Conservative	Stephen Eyre	2,614	54.3	+12.8
Alliance (Liberal)	Timothy Farazmand	1,910	39.7	−7.0
Labour	Sean McWhinne	291	6.0	−5.9
Majority		704	14.6	+9.4
Turnout		4,815	50.0	+13.8
Conservative hold		Swing	+9.9	

Packwood
Party	Candidate	Votes	%	±%
Conservative	Timothy Vernon	2,281	47.8	+4.3
Independent Residents	David van Rest	2,270	47.6	−2.3
Labour	Sheila Brookes	217	4.5	−2.0
Majority		11	0.2	−6.1
Turnout		4,768	50.9	+10.4
Conservative gain from Independent Residents		Swing	+3.3	

Shirley East
Party	Candidate	Votes	%	±%
Conservative	Reginald Davies	1,967	49.5	+10.1
Alliance (SDP)	Ernest Garwood	854	21.5	−3.1
Independent Residents & Ratepayers	Richard Jackson	810	20.4	−1.4
Labour	Margaret Brittin	346	8.7	−5.5
Majority		1,113	28.0	+13.3
Turnout		3,977	40.1	+7.8
Conservative hold		Swing	+6.6	

Shirley South
Party	Candidate	Votes	%	±%
Independent Ratepayers	James Eames	2,419	47.9	−3.7
Conservative	Peter Hogarth	2,223	44.0	+8.0
Labour	Maurice Jones	408	8.1	−4.3
Majority		196	3.9	−11.7
Turnout		5,050	42.4	+9.3
Independent Ratepayers hold		Swing	-5.8	

Shirley West
Party	Candidate	Votes	%	±%
Conservative	Terence Powell	2,071	54.2	+15.3
Alliance (Liberal)	John Reeve	1,303	34.1	−3.1
Labour	Christine Horton	449	11.7	−10.3
Majority		768	20.1	+18.4
Turnout		3,823	39.1	+9.0
Conservative hold		Swing	+9.2	

Silhill
Party	Candidate	Votes	%	±%
Conservative	Geoffrey Gibbons	2,647	60.4	+12.0
Alliance (SDP)	Peter Congdon	1,363	31.1	−6.0
Labour	Colin Smith	372	8.5	−6.0
Majority		1,284	29.3	+18.0
Turnout		4,382	42.2	+9.7
Conservative hold		Swing	+9.0	

Smith's Wood
Party	Candidate	Votes	%	±%
Labour	Donald Cornock	1,529	51.5	−28.0
Conservative	Mark Saunders	818	27.5	+7.0
Alliance (SDP)	Ann Clements	623	21.0	+21.0
Majority		711	24.0	−35.0
Turnout		2,970	32.3	+4.2
Labour hold		Swing	-17.5	

St. Alphege
Party	Candidate	Votes	%	±%
Conservative	Ronald Herd	3,289	72.1	+12.9
Alliance (SDP)	Gomer Thomas	1,120	24.6	−10.7
Labour	Graham Craig	151	3.3	−2.3
Majority		2,169	47.6	+23.6
Turnout		4,560	47.6	+13.0
Conservative hold		Swing	+11.8	
