= 1992 Solihull Metropolitan Borough Council election =

1992 UK local government election

(1991 ←) 1992 United Kingdom local elections (→ 1994)

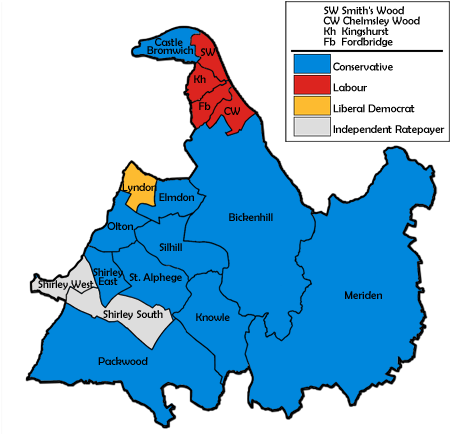
Map of the results for the 1992 Solihull council election.

The 1992 Solihull Metropolitan Borough Council elections were held on Thursday, 7 May 1992, with one third of the council to be elected. The council remained under no overall control with the Conservatives three seats short of a majority. Voter turnout was 37.8%.

== Election result ==
Solihull local election result 1992
Party	Seats	Gains	Losses	Net gain/loss	Seats %	Votes %	Votes	+/−
Conservative	10	1	0	+1	58.8	57.0	33,601	+10.8
Labour	4	0	1	-1	23.5	16.8	9,935	-6.2
Independent Ratepayers & Residents	2	0	0	0	11.8	8.8	5,187	+0.5
Liberal Democrats	1	0	0	0	5.9	15.5	9,165	-3.0
Green	0	0	0	0	0.0	1.9	1,095	-1.7

This result had the following consequences for the total number of seats on the council after the elections:

Party	Previous council	New council
Conservatives	23	24
Labour	16	15
Independent Ratepayers & Residents	6	6
Liberal Democrats	6	6
Total	51	51
Working majority	-5	-3

== Ward results ==
Bickenhill
Party	Candidate	Votes	%	±%
Conservative	Elizabeth Plaister	2,524	63.1	+8.3
Labour	Jeffrey Potts	1,272	31.8	−4.6
Green	Pamela Archer	204	5.1	−3.7
Majority		1,252	31.3	+12.9
Turnout		4,000	40.7	−11.6
Conservative hold		Swing	+6.4	

Castle Bromwich
Party	Candidate	Votes	%	±%
Conservative	George Richards	3,017	77.8	+13.7
Labour	Robert Davis	742	19.1	−9.8
Green	M. Dudley	119	3.1	−3.9
Majority		2,275	58.7	+23.5
Turnout		3,878	39.9	−7.1
Conservative hold		Swing	+11.7	

Chelmsley Wood
Party	Candidate	Votes	%	±%
Labour	Alfred Hill	971	53.3	−8.7
Conservative	Beryl Kellie	703	38.6	+14.1
Liberal Democrats	Olive Hogg	147	8.1	−5.4
Majority		268	14.7	−22.8
Turnout		1,821	20.7	−7.5
Labour hold		Swing	-11.4	

Elmdon
Party	Candidate	Votes	%	±%
Conservative	Donald Jones	1,831	49.2	+9.0
Labour	Eileen Turner	1,410	37.9	−5.1
Independent	Herbert Hitchcock	481	12.9	−3.9
Majority		421	11.3	+8.5
Turnout		3,722	44.5	−7.8
Conservative gain from Labour		Swing	+7.0	

Fordbridge
Party	Candidate	Votes	%	±%
Labour	Michael Corser	800	56.9	−3.7
Conservative	Michael Wyldbore-Smith	494	35.1	+10.2
Liberal Democrats	A. Blakeley	112	8.0	−2.0
Majority		306	21.8	−13.9
Turnout		1,406	20.3	−8.7
Labour hold		Swing	-6.9	

Kingshurst
Party	Candidate	Votes	%	±%
Labour	Frederick Allen	952	55.2	−9.3
Conservative	Dorothy Wallace	705	40.9	+15.7
Green	Trevor Barker	68	3.9	+0.3
Majority		247	14.3	−25.0
Turnout		1,725	27.3	−11.3
Labour hold		Swing	-12.5	

Knowle
Party	Candidate	Votes	%	±%
Conservative	Leslie Kyles	2,825	75.0	+10.5
Liberal Democrats	Bernadette Pruden	750	19.9	−8.1
Labour	Vera Wood	191	5.1	−2.3
Majority		2,075	55.1	+18.6
Turnout		3,766	43.0	−6.7
Conservative hold		Swing	+9.3	

Lyndon
Party	Candidate	Votes	%	±%
Liberal Democrats	Richard Balmer	1,775	52.0	−4.0
Conservative	Gloria Cox	1,333	39.1	+10.6
Labour	Joan Holt	305	8.9	−6.5
Majority		442	12.9	−14.6
Turnout		3,413	41.4	−8.0
Liberal Democrats hold		Swing	-7.3	

Meriden
Party	Candidate	Votes	%	±%
Conservative	Alan Vincent	2,263	69.1	+11.2
Liberal Democrats	Richard Morris	742	22.7	−8.8
Labour	Arthur Brill	269	8.2	−2.3
Majority		1,521	46.5	+20.0
Turnout		3,274	38.8	−11.5
Conservative hold		Swing	+10.0	

Olton
Party	Candidate	Votes	%	±%
Conservative	Diana Holl-Allen	2,245	52.5	+5.1
Liberal Democrats	Honor Cox	1,860	43.5	−1.0
Labour	A. Davis	173	4.0	−4.1
Majority		385	9.0	+6.1
Turnout		4,278	46.4	−3.2
Conservative hold		Swing	+3.0	

Packwood
Party	Candidate	Votes	%	±%
Conservative	Kenneth Meeson	2,858	62.5	+20.0
Liberal Democrats	Jennifer Wright	1,589	34.8	−15.5
Labour	Frederick Bradley	122	2.7	+0.2
Majority		1,269	27.8	+20.0
Turnout		4,569	48.3	−7.0
Conservative hold		Swing	+17.7	

Shirley East
Party	Candidate	Votes	%	±%
Conservative	Theresa Samuels	2,192	54.4	+11.9
Liberal Democrats	Michael Southcombe	1,607	39.9	−8.5
Labour	Derek Jones	233	5.8	−3.4
Majority		585	14.5	+8.6
Turnout		4,032	44.2	−4.3
Conservative hold		Swing	+10.2	

Shirley South
Party	Candidate	Votes	%	±%
Independent	Ursula Eames	2,787	53.1	+1.8
Conservative	Philip Cross	2,152	41.0	+2.3
Labour	Barry Beattie	305	5.8	−4.1
Majority		635	12.1	−0.4
Turnout		5,244	40.4	−6.4
Independent hold		Swing	-0.2	

Shirley West
Party	Candidate	Votes	%	±%
Independent Ratepayers	Jane Granger	1,919	55.0	+7.3
Conservative	Denis Eyre	1,308	37.5	−0.2
Labour	Robert Houghton	262	7.5	−7.1
Majority		611	17.5	+7.5
Turnout		3,489	37.2	−4.7
Independent Ratepayers hold		Swing	+3.7	

Silhill
Party	Candidate	Votes	%	±%
Conservative	Peter Hogarth	2,977	73.4	+12.9
Liberal Democrats	Bernard Winchcombe	583	14.4	−8.2
Labour	Donald Bargery	494	12.2	−4.7
Majority		2,394	59.0	+21.2
Turnout		4,054	40.0	−6.0
Conservative hold		Swing	+10.6	

Smith's Wood
Party	Candidate	Votes	%	±%
Labour	Graham Craig	1,171	60.8	−7.6
Conservative	Richard Hubbard	698	36.2	+10.7
Green	Peter May	58	3.0	−3.1
Majority		473	24.5	−18.3
Turnout		1,927	21.7	−9.1
Labour hold		Swing	-9.1	

St. Alphege
Party	Candidate	Votes	%	±%
Conservative	Stephen Eyre	3,476	79.3	+17.1
Green	Clifford Hards	646	14.7	−10.5
Labour	J. Yeomans	263	6.0	−6.6
Majority		2,830	64.5	+27.7
Turnout		4,385	44.0	−7.8
Conservative hold		Swing	+13.8	
