= 2022 Solihull Metropolitan Borough Council election =

2022 UK local government election

← 2021	5 May 2022	2023 →

17 out of 51 seats to Solihull Metropolitan Borough Council 26 seats needed for a majority

	First party	Second party
Party	Conservative	Green
Last election	30 seats, 46.8%	15 seats, 25.1%
Seats before	30	12
Seats won	9	4
Seats after	28	14
Seat change	▼2	▼1
Popular vote	24,826	8,792
Percentage	46.3%	16.4%
Swing	▼0.5%	▼8.7%
	Third party	Fourth party
Party	Liberal Democrats	Independent
Last election	3 seats, 11.9%	1 seat, 0.0%
Seats before	3	5
Seats won	3	1
Seats after	5	4
Seat change	▲2	▲1
Popular vote	9,173	1,957
Percentage	17.1%	3.7%
Swing	▲5.2%	N/A
- Winner of each seat at the 2022 Solihull Metropolitan Borough Council election
Council control before election
Conservative
Council control after election
Conservative

The 2022 Solihull Metropolitan Borough Council election took place on 5 May 2022 to elect members of Solihull Metropolitan Borough Council. This was on the same day as other local elections. 17 of the 51 seats were up for election.

== Background ==
Since its creation in 1974, Solihull Metropolitan Borough Council has always had the Conservatives as the largest party. Labour came the closest to overtaking them in 1996, when they won 16 seats to the Conservatives' 17. In the 2021 election, the Conservatives gained three seats on a vote share of 53.8% (+7.9), the Green Party gained 1 seat with 20.5% of the vote (-5.1), the Liberal Democrats lost 3 seats on 12.2% (-1.3), and Labour lost 1 seat on 12.9% (+0.9).

The seats up for election in 2022 were last elected in 2018. In that election, the Conservatives won 49.1% of votes and gained 2 seats from the Liberal Democrats, the Greens gained 1 seat from the Conservatives and won 25.1% of the votes, Labour gained 1 seat from UKIP and won 15.5%, and the Liberal Democrats lost 1 seat and achieved 11.9%.

== Previous council composition ==
After 2021 election		Before 2022 election		After 2022 election	
Party	Seats	Party	Seats	Party	Seats
Conservative	30	Conservative	30	Conservative	28
Green	15	Green	12	Green	14
Liberal Democrats	3	Liberal Democrats	3	Liberal Democrats	5
Labour	2	Labour	0	Labour	0
Independent	1	Independent	5	Independent	4

Changes:

- September 2021: Angela Sandison suspended from the Conservatives
- October 2021: David Cole joins Conservatives from Labour, and Marcus Brain joins Greens from Labour
- November 2021: Cheryl Buxton-Sait (Green) resigns from council; seat left vacant until 2022 election
- February 2022: Andy Hodgson, Tim Hodgson, and Rosemary Sexton leave Greens

== Results summary ==
2022 Solihull Metropolitan Borough Council election
Party	This election			Full council			This election		
Party	Seats	Net	Seats %	Other	Total	Total %	Votes	Votes %	+/−
Conservative	9	▼1	52.9	19	28	54.9	24,826	46.3	–0.5
Green	4	▼1	23.5	10	14	27.5	8,792	16.4	–8.7
Liberal Democrats	3	▲2	17.6	2	5	9.8	9,173	17.1	+5.2
Independent	1	▲1	5.9	3	4	7.8	1,957	3.7	N/A
Labour	0	▼1	0.0	0	0	0.0	8,863	16.5	+1.0

== Results by ward ==
An asterisk indicates an incumbent councillor.

=== Bickenhill ===
Bickenhill
Party	Candidate	Votes	%	±%
Conservative	Gail Sleigh	1,544	58.5	▼2.9
Labour	Margaret Brittin	589	22.3	▼5.1
Green	Mark Pearson	296	11.2	▲4.5
Liberal Democrats	Paul McCabe	211	8.0	▲3.5
Majority		955	36.2	?
Turnout		2640		
Conservative hold		Swing	▲6.3	

=== Blythe ===
Blythe
Party	Candidate	Votes	%	±%
Conservative	Richard Holt*	1,936	55.2	▼12.5
Labour	Jacqueline Sowsbery-Moore	667	19.0	▲5.2
Green	Carol Linfield	472	13.5	▲4.3
Liberal Democrats	John Wyatt	434	12.4	▲3.1
Majority		1269	36.2	?
Turnout		3509		
Conservative hold		Swing	▼2.8	

=== Castle Bromwich ===
Castle Bromwich
Party	Candidate	Votes	%	±%
Conservative	Alan Feeney	1,556	57.7	▲30.7
Green	Antony Lowe	606	22.5	▼41.7
Labour	Emma Childer	535	19.8	▲10.7
Majority		950	35.4	▼2.1
Turnout		2697		
Conservative gain from Green		Swing	▲5.8	

=== Chelmsley Wood ===
Chelmsley Wood
Party	Candidate	Votes	%	±%
Green	Stephen Rymer	1,094	67.1	▼10.8
Labour	Hazel Dawkins	335	20.5	▲6.2
Conservative	Steve Temperton	202	12.4	▲4.6
Majority		759	46.5	▼17.1
Turnout		1631		▼5.2
Green hold		Swing	▼5.2	

=== Dorridge and Hockley Heath ===
Dorridge and Hockley Heath
Party	Candidate	Votes	%	±%
Conservative	Ian Courts*	2,183	61.2	▼7.7
Labour	David Brittin	524	14.7	▲4.8
Green	Jane Holt	505	14.2	▲5.5
Liberal Democrats	David Godfrey	354	9.9	▼2.6
Majority		1659	46.5	?
Turnout		3566		
Conservative hold		Swing	▼6.8	

=== Elmdon ===
Elmdon
Party	Candidate	Votes	%	±%
Liberal Democrats	Laura McCarthy*	1,870	56.8	▲13.2
Conservative	Leslie Kaye	1043	31.7	▼9.8
Labour	Sarah Alan	381	11.6	▼3.4
Majority		827	25.1	?
Turnout		3294		
Liberal Democrats hold		Swing	▲11.5	

=== Kingshurst and Fordbridge ===
Kingshurst and Fordbridge
Party	Candidate	Votes	%	±%
Green	Bernadette Donnelly	652	37.7	▲32.7
Conservative	David Cole*	620	35.8	▲1.3
Labour	Sam Mather	459	26.5	▼20.5
Majority		32	1.8	?
Turnout		1731		
Green gain from Labour		Swing	▼39.2	

=== Knowle ===
Knowle
Party	Candidate	Votes	%	±%
Conservative	Diana Holl-Allen*	2,040	60.4	▼12.2
Labour	Simon Johnson	484	14.3	▲2.3
Liberal Democrats	Kate Jones	463	13.7	▲5.7
Green	Mark Amphlett	390	11.5	▲4.1
Majority		1556	46.1	▼14.6
Turnout		3377		
Conservative hold		Swing	▲0.2	

=== Lyndon ===
Lyndon
Party	Candidate	Votes	%	±%
Liberal Democrats	Ade Adeyemo	1,797	48.2	▲17.0
Conservative	Sardul Marwa	1443	38.7	▼1.7
Labour	Sheila Brookes	489	13.1	▼15.3
Majority		354	9.5	?
Turnout		3729		
Liberal Democrats gain from Conservative		Swing	▲9.6	

=== Meriden ===
Meriden
Party	Candidate	Votes	%	±%
Conservative	Andrew Burrow	2,103	54.2	▼18.4
Green	Sheila Cooper	1353	34.8	▲20.3
Labour	Cathy Connan	427	11.0	▼1.8
Majority		750	19.3	?
Turnout		3883		
Conservative hold		Swing	▼13.3	

=== Olton ===
Olton
Party	Candidate	Votes	%	±%
Liberal Democrats	Michael Carthew	2,154	52.8	▲11.1 *
Conservative	Keith Green	1379	33.8	▼8.6 *
Labour	Antony Oseland	543	13.3	▼1.2 *
Majority		775	19.0	?
Turnout		4076		
Liberal Democrats gain from Conservative		Swing	▲9.8	

- Compared to 2018 election results*

=== Shirley East ===
Shirley East
Party	Candidate	Votes	%	±%
Conservative	Annette Mackenzie*	1,839	55.9	▼2.8
Labour	Gerard Dufficy	612	18.6	▲3.3
Green	Akin Kog	470	14.3	▲5.5
Liberal Democrats	Gayle Monk	366	11.1	▼6.1
Majority		1227	37.3	?
Turnout		3287		
Conservative hold		Swing	▼3.7	

=== Shirley South ===
Shirley South
Party	Candidate	Votes	%	±%
Independent	Andy Hodgson*	1,809	49.4	▼10.9
Conservative	Howard Nichols	1199	32.7	▲3.2
Labour	Shirley Young	506	13.8	▲3.5
Independent	Rosemary Worsley	148	4.0	−
Majority		610	16.7	▼14.1
Turnout		3662		
Independent gain from Green		Swing	▲2.4	

*Andy Hodgson's changes are relative to when he stood in the 2018 Elections under the Green Party.

=== Shirley West ===
Shirley West
Party	Candidate	Votes	%	±%
Green	Alison Wilson	1,549	48.5	▼11.8
Conservative	Lachhman Bhambra	1041	32.6	▲3.1
Labour	Kevin Round	607	19.0	▲8.7
Majority		508	15.9	▼14.9
Turnout		3197		
Green hold		Swing	▲3.0	

=== Silhill ===
Silhill
Party	Candidate	Votes	%	±%
Conservative	Michael Gough*	1,960	55.8	▼7.8
Labour	Nick Stephens	802	22.8	▲6.8
Liberal Democrats	James Edwardson	753	21.4	▲7.0
Majority		1158	32.9	?
Turnout		3515		
Conservative hold		Swing	▼5.5	

=== Smith's Wood ===
Smith's Wood
Party	Candidate	Votes	%	±%
Green	Ben Groom*	993	63.4	▲3.8
Labour	Keith Duggan	333	21.3	▲0.6
Conservative	Lavanya Madras Purushothaman	240	15.3	▲4.8
Majority		660	42.1	▲3.3
Turnout		1566		
Green hold		Swing	▼2.1	

=== St. Alphege ===
St. Alphege
Party	Candidate	Votes	%	±%
Conservative	Samantha Gethen	2,498	58.8	▼11.0
Liberal Democrats	Frank Dawson	771	18.1	▲4.9
Labour	Ian English	570	13.4	▲3.1
Green	Trevor Barker	412	9.7	▲3.0
Majority		1727	40.6	?
Turnout		4251		
Conservative hold		Swing	▼3.6	
