= 2015 Solihull Metropolitan Borough Council election =

2015 local election in England

(2014 ←) 2015 United Kingdom local elections (→ 2016)

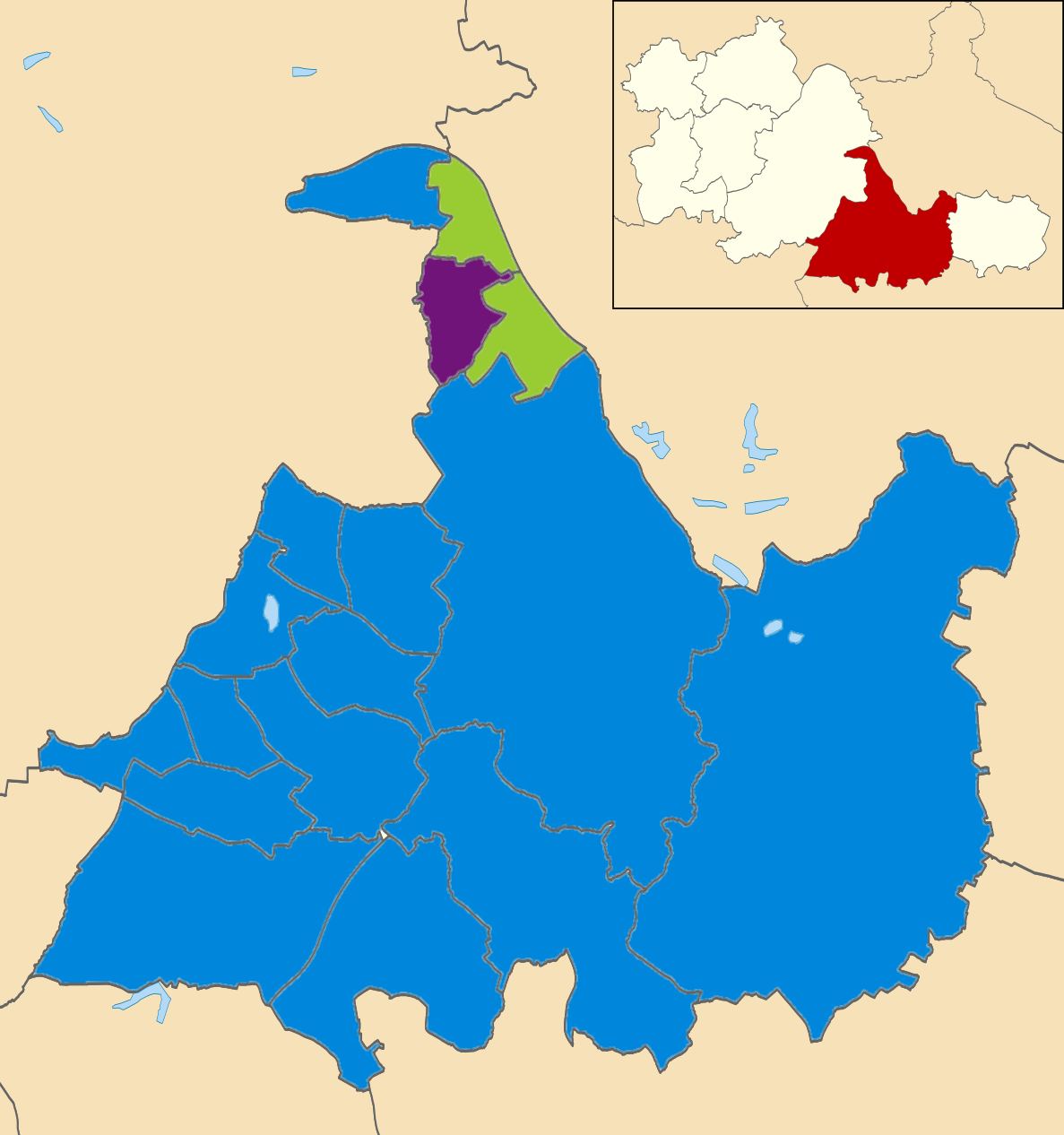
2015 local election results in Solihull

The 2015 Solihull Metropolitan Borough Council election took place on 7 May 2015 to elect members of the Solihull Metropolitan Borough Council in England. It was held on the same day as other local elections and on the same day as the General Election.

The Conservative Party won every seat with 3 exceptions (The Green Party held Chelmsley Wood and Smith's Wood, and UKIP gained Kingshurst and Fordbridge from Labour).

== Ward results ==
=== Bickenhill ===
Bickenhill
Party	Candidate	Votes	%	±%
Conservative	Bob Sleigh	3,185	54.4	▼6.0
UKIP	Gerald Blake	1214	20.7	▲20.7
Labour	Mike Longfield	1061	18.1	▼3.2
Green	Gary Macnaughton	397	6.8	▲1.7
Majority		1971	33.7	▼5.4
Turnout		5880	62.3	▲25.9
Conservative hold		Swing	▼13.4	

=== Blythe ===
Blythe
Party	Candidate	Votes	%	±%
Conservative	Ken Hawkins	5,302	74.1	▲18.9
Green	Jo Hodgson	1014	14.2	▲11.8
Labour	Sardul Marwa	839	11.7	▼0.3
Majority		4288	59.9	▲24.5
Turnout		7211	69.7	▲28.3
Conservative hold		Swing	▲3.6	

=== Castle Bromwich ===
Castle Bromwich
Party	Candidate	Votes	%	±%
Conservative	Gail Sleigh	3,286	53.1	▼11.0
Labour	Alan Jacques	1407	22.7	▼1.2
UKIP	Glen Lawrence	1233	19.9	▲19.9
Green	Eleanor Perfect	264	4.3	▼3.3
Majority		1879	30.4	▼9.8
Turnout		6212	65.1	▲25.5
Conservative hold		Swing	▼4.9	

=== Chelmsley Wood ===
Chelmsley Wood
Party	Candidate	Votes	%	±%
Green	Karl Macnaughton	2,904	68.2	▲16.9
Labour	Emma Chidler	806	18.9	▼12.2
Conservative	Sally Bell	548	12.9	▼0.8
Majority		2098	49.3	▲29.1
Turnout		4296	50.3	▲21.3
Green hold		Swing	▲14.6	

=== Dorridge & Hockley Heath ===
Dorridge & Hockley Heath
Party	Candidate	Votes	%	±%
Conservative	Andy Mackiewicz	4,862	71.9	▲3.0
Liberal Democrats	Paul Fairburn	830	12.3	▲0.2
Labour	Elizabeth Thacker	572	8.5	▲0.7
Green	Iona McIntyre	495	7.3	▲2.6
Majority		4032	59.7	▲2.9
Turnout		6212	76.5	▲25.2
Conservative hold		Swing	▲1.4	

=== Elmdon ===
Elmdon
Party	Candidate	Votes	%	±%
Conservative	Martin McCarthy	2,035	31.4	▼1.2
Green	Jean Hamilton	1494	23.0	▲21.1
Liberal Democrats	Jonathan Wharrad	1191	18.4	▼22.9
UKIP	John Bramham	1107	17.1	▲11.6
Labour	Marcus Brain	655	10.1	▼4.4
Majority		541	8.3	N/A
Turnout		6500	67.7	▲25.3
Conservative gain from Liberal Democrats		Swing	▲10.9	

=== Kingshurst and Fordbridge ===
Kingshurst & Fordbridge
Party	Candidate	Votes	%	±%
UKIP	Robert Hall	1,548	35.6	▲35.6
Labour	Alan Nash	1332	30.6	▼20.2
Conservative	Paul Thomas	1176	27.0	▼9.5
Green	David Davies	293	6.7	▲1.4
Majority		216	5.0	N/A
Turnout		4362	48.0	▲21.7
UKIP gain from Labour		Swing	▲27.9	

=== Knowle ===
Knowle
Party	Candidate	Votes	%	±%
Conservative	Alan Rebeiro	4,696	73.6	▲4.7
Green	Michael Bleby	926	14.5	▲7.5
Labour	Simon Johnson	758	11.9	▲1.7
Majority		3770	59.1	▲0.4
Turnout		6436	76.2	▲25.3
Conservative hold		Swing	▼1.4	

=== Lyndon ===
Lyndon
Party	Candidate	Votes	%	±%
Conservative	Julie Hulland	2,553	38.7	▲12.3
Liberal Democrats	Adekunle Adeyemo	2207	33.4	▼7.3
Labour	Martin Tolman	1302	19.7	▲0.4
Green	Elaine Williams	539	8.2	▲4.9
Majority		346	5.2	N/A
Turnout		6665	65.6	▲26.3
Conservative gain from Liberal Democrats		Swing	▲9.8	

=== Meriden ===
Meriden
Party	Candidate	Votes	%	±%
Conservative	David Bell	4,591	63.9	▼1.4
UKIP	Leslie Kaye	1046	14.6	▲14.6
Labour	Catherine Connan	1019	14.2	▼2.0
Green	Mark Pearson	528	7.3	▲2.6
Majority		3545	49.3	▲0.2
Turnout		7205	73.6	▲25.7
Conservative hold		Swing	▼8.0	

=== Olton ===
Olton
Party	Candidate	Votes	%	±%
Conservative	Robert Grinsell	3,325	47.3	▲7.6
Liberal Democrats	Priya Chauhan	2314	32.9	▼10.9
Labour	Martin Tolman	830	11.8	▲1.3
Green	Elaine Williams	563	8.0	▲4.5
Majority		1011	14.4	N/A
Turnout		7092	71.5	▲25.5
Conservative gain from Liberal Democrats		Swing	▲9.3	

=== Shirley East ===
Shirley East
Party	Candidate	Votes	%	±%
Conservative	Mark Parker	3,323	53.1	▲8.9
Liberal Democrats	Peter Lee	1439	23.0	▼4.8
Labour	Kevin Raven	889	14.2	▲1.9
Green	Eleanor Aldworth	604	9.7	▲6.3
Majority		1884	30.1	▲13.7
Turnout		6307	70.1	▲25.3
Conservative hold		Swing	▲6.9	

=== Shirley South ===
Shirley South
Party	Candidate	Votes	%	±%
Conservative	Angela Sandison	2,850	41.1	▲2.3
Green	Michelle Edinburgh	1459	21.1	▲17.7
Liberal Democrats	Martin Smith	1086	15.7	▼18.7
UKIP	Rosemary Worsley	902	13.0	▲13.0
Labour	Shirley Young	634	9.1	▼2.9
Majority		1391	20.1	▲15.7
Turnout		6953	69.1	▲25.4
Conservative hold		Swing	▼7.7	

=== Shirley West ===
Shirley West
Party	Candidate	Votes	%	±%
Conservative	Brian Holmes	2,133	33.4	▼1.6
Green	Margaret Allen	1634	25.6	▲20.8
Liberal Democrats	Eimear Fossey	960	15.0	▼16.0
UKIP	Rosemary Worsley	933	14.6	▲14.6
Labour	Raymond Brookes	720	11.3	▼7.3
Majority		499	7.8	▲3.8
Turnout		6391	67.2	▲26.5
Conservative hold		Swing	▼11.2	

=== Silhill ===
Silhill
Party	Candidate	Votes	%	±%
Conservative	Robert Hulland	3,893	58.0	▲5.0
Liberal Democrats	Gaynor Mason	1613	24.0	▼2.5
Labour	Janet Marsh	798	11.9	▲0.2
Green	Trevor Barker	407	6.1	▲3.7
Majority		2280	34.0	▲7.4
Turnout		6754	70.6	▲22.4
Conservative hold		Swing	▲3.8	

=== Smith's Wood ===
Smith's Wood
Party	Candidate	Votes	%	±%
Green	Mark Wilson	2,576	61.2	▲15.3
Labour	David Cole	1018	24.2	▼9.0
Conservative	Graham Juniper	613	14.6	▲2.0
Majority		1558	37.0	▲24.3
Turnout		4327	51.5	▲25.4
Green hold		Swing	▲12.2	

=== St Alphege ===
St Alphege
Party	Candidate	Votes	%	±%
Conservative	Joe Tildesley	5,531	68.8	▲2.1
Liberal Democrats	Stuart Jameson	1351	16.8	▲0.7
Labour	Paul Tuxworth	654	8.1	▼2.1
Green	Margaret Ryan	501	6.2	▲2.2
Majority		4180	52.0	▲1.4
Turnout		8086	75.5	▲25.2
Conservative hold		Swing	▲0.7	
