= 1999 Solihull Metropolitan Borough Council election =

1999 UK local government election

(1998 ←) 1999 United Kingdom local elections (→ 2000)

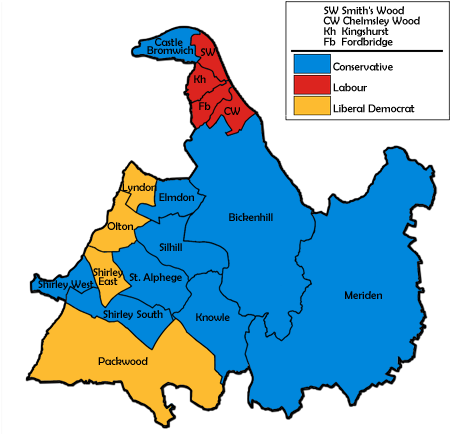
Map of the results for the 1999 Solihull council election.

The 1999 Solihull Metropolitan Borough Council election took place on 6 May 1999 to elect members of Solihull Metropolitan Borough Council in the West Midlands, England. One third of the council was up for election and the council stayed under no overall control.

== Campaign ==
Before the election the Conservative party needed to gain 5 seats in order to take control over the council, which was being run by a Labour led administration. The Conservatives were defending 7 seats at the election, compared to 6 for Labour, 4 for the Liberal Democrats and 1 independent seat. The 2 seats that were to be contested in Shirley West ward after the death of a Labour councillor and the stepping down of an independent councillor at the election were top targets for the Conservatives.

Labour defended their record in control of the council pointing to their record in combating crime and surpassing national targets for reducing class sizes. However the Conservatives were optimistic of making gains and said they could deliver good services, while keeping council tax levels low.

== Election result ==
The results saw the Conservatives make 3 gains to strengthen their position as the largest party on the council with 24 seats, but failed to make the 5 gains they needed to take majority control. The Conservatives easily gained the 2 seats contested in Shirley West and another in Elmdon from Labour, but fell short in another 2 seats. They were just 15 votes from winning Shirley East from the Liberal Democrats, while in Packwood the Liberal Democrats held on by 76 votes over the Conservatives after 2 recounts. Overall turnout in the election was 28.3%.

The Conservatives won over half of the votes in the election, but combined the Labour and Liberal Democrat parties retained more seats. However following the election the Liberal Democrats refused to make any agreement with Labour, thus allowing the Conservatives to take control as the largest party from Labour who had run the council since 1996. Labour councillor Arthur Harper was meanwhile elected mayor, becoming the first Labour councillor to hold the post since 1980.

Solihull local election result 1999
Party	Seats	Gains	Losses	Net gain/loss	Seats %	Votes %	Votes	+/−
Conservative	10	3	0	+3	55.5	51.0	22,828	+6.0%
Liberal Democrats	4	0	0	0	22.2	25.5	11,423	+2.2%
Labour	4	0	2	-2	22.2	23.5	10,518	-1.9%

This result had the following consequences for the total number of seats on the council after the elections :

Party	Previous council	New council
Conservatives	21	24
Labour	17	15
Liberal Democrat	11	11
Independent Ratepayers & Residents	2	1
Total	51	51
Working majority	-9	-3

== Ward results ==
Bickenhill
Party	Candidate	Votes	%	±%
Conservative	Alan Martin	1,765	58.6	+21.8
Labour	Frederick Nash	1,049	34.8	−23.7
Liberal Democrats	Christine Reeves	200	6.6	+1.8
Majority		716	23.8	+2.0
Turnout		3,014	29.9	−5.4
Conservative hold		Swing	+22.8	

Castle Bromwich
Party	Candidate	Votes	%	±%
Conservative	Robin Draycott	1,705	63.0	+0.9
Labour	Marcus Brain	788	29.1	+0.2
Liberal Democrats	John Knight	214	7.9	−1.2
Majority		917	33.9	+0.7
Turnout		2,707	28.5	−1.0
Conservative hold		Swing	+0.3	

Chelmsley Wood
Party	Candidate	Votes	%	±%
Labour	Nicholas Stephens	841	66.6	−3.0
Conservative	Graham White	300	23.8	+1.7
Liberal Democrats	Bernard Wright	122	9.7	−1.4
Majority		541	42.8	−4.7
Turnout		1,263	15.7	−0.9
Labour hold		Swing	-2.3	

Elmdon
Party	Candidate	Votes	%	±%
Conservative	John Bramham	1,430	52.7	+11.5
Labour	Florence Nash	1,003	36.9	−14.1
Liberal Democrats	Barbara Harber	283	10.4	+2.5
Majority		427	15.7	+5.8
Turnout		2,716	33.4	−2.7
Conservative gain from Labour		Swing	+12.8	

Fordbridge
Party	Candidate	Votes	%	±%
Labour	Kenneth Harrop	638	66.1	−2.2
Conservative	Timothy Vernon	240	24.9	+1.7
Liberal Democrats	Jennifer Wright	87	9.0	+0.5
Majority		398	41.2	−4.0
Turnout		965	15.3	+0.9
Labour hold		Swing	-2.0	

Kingshurst
Party	Candidate	Votes	%	±%
Labour	John Kimberley	745	61.4	+17.1
Conservative	Joan Allsopp	353	29.1	+10.0
Liberal Democrats	Christopher Hayes	115	9.5	+5.3
Majority		392	32.3	+20.3
Turnout		1,213	20.7	−0.2
Labour hold		Swing	+3.5	

Knowle
Party	Candidate	Votes	%	±%
Conservative	Don Blake	1,977	68.8	+6.5
Labour	C. Cotton	463	16.1	−6.0
Liberal Democrats	Douglas Hogg	434	15.1	−0.5
Majority		1,514	52.7	+12.4
Turnout		2,874	32.1	−0.3
Conservative hold		Swing	+6.2	

Lyndon
Party	Candidate	Votes	%	±%
Liberal Democrats	Olive Hogg	1,371	59.7	+3.2
Conservative	T. Handslip	560	24.4	−4.3
Labour	Kevin Foster	367	16.0	+1.1
Majority		811	35.3	+7.6
Turnout		2,298	29.0	−1.30
Liberal Democrats hold		Swing	+3.7	

Meriden
Party	Candidate	Votes	%	±%
Conservative	Kenneth Allsopp	1,786	64.4	−4.5
Labour	Patricia Harrop	590	21.3	+2.2
Liberal Democrats	Peter Whitlock	399	14.4	+2.4
Majority		1,196	43.1	−6.7
Turnout		2,775	30.3	−2.3
Conservative hold		Swing	-3.3	

Olton
Party	Candidate	Votes	%	±%
Liberal Democrats	Honor Cox	1,917	55.6	+3.7
Conservative	Donald Jones	1,251	36.3	+1.5
Labour	Philip Knowles	279	8.1	−0.5
Majority		666	19.3	+2.2
Turnout		3,447	35.8	−0.6
Liberal Democrats hold		Swing	+1.1	

Packwood
Party	Candidate	Votes	%	±%
Liberal Democrats	Peter Lee	2,005	48.5	+5.0
Conservative	Robert Sleigh	1,929	46.6	−5.0
Labour	William Shaw	203	4.9	+0.0
Majority		76	1.8	−6.3
Turnout		4,137	38.7	−1.3
Liberal Democrats hold		Swing	+5.0	

Shirley East
Party	Candidate	Votes	%	±%
Liberal Democrats	John Reeve	1,472	45.0	−2.7
Conservative	Neill Watts	1,457	44.6	+6.3
Labour	Margaret Brittin	340	10.4	+0.5
Majority		15	0.5	−9.0
Turnout		3,269	34.6	−0.5
Liberal Democrats hold		Swing	-4.5	

Shirley South
Party	Candidate	Votes	%	±%
Conservative	Fiona Mawson	2,101	63.2	+22.7
Labour	Bernard McElholm	709	21.3	+2.2
Liberal Democrats	Eric Widger	515	15.5	+6.4
Majority		1,392	41.9	+32.6
Turnout		3,325	24.8	−2.3
Conservative hold		Swing	+10.2	

Shirley West
Party	Candidate	Votes	%	±%
Conservative	David Skelding	1,375	50.9	+18.2
Conservative	Ian Hillas	1,339		
Labour	David George	889	32.9	+6.4
Labour	Michael Weale	798		
Liberal Democrats	Susan Reeve	437	16.2	+10.2
Liberal Democrats	Anthony Verduyn	274		
Majority		486	18.0	+11.8
Turnout		2,701	28.6	−1.0
Conservative gain from Independent Ratepayers		Swing		
Conservative gain from Labour		Swing	+5.9	

Silhill
Party	Candidate	Votes	%	±%
Conservative	Susan Gomm	1,838	54.3	+6.9
Liberal Democrats	Robert Reeves	1,111	32.8	−9.0
Labour	Richard Sumner	438	12.9	+2.1
Majority		727	21.5	+15.9
Turnout		3,387	33.0	−3.6
Conservative hold		Swing	+7.9	

Smith's Wood
Party	Candidate	Votes	%	±%
Labour	Donald Cornock	759	65.3	−4.8
Conservative	Daniel Kettle	273	23.5	+2.2
Liberal Democrats	Keith Brown	130	11.2	+2.6
Majority		486	41.8	−7.0
Turnout		1,162	14.3	−1.0
Labour hold		Swing	-3.5	

St. Alphege
Party	Candidate	Votes	%	±%
Conservative	Stuart Davis	2,488	70.8	−0.1
Liberal Democrats	Brenda Chapple	611	17.4	−0.9
Labour	Marcus Bennion	417	11.9	+1.0
Majority		1,877	53.4	+0.8
Turnout		3,516	31.0	−2.1
Conservative hold		Swing	+0.4	
