= 1998 Solihull Metropolitan Borough Council election =

1998 UK local government election

(1996 ←) 1998 United Kingdom local elections (→ 1999)

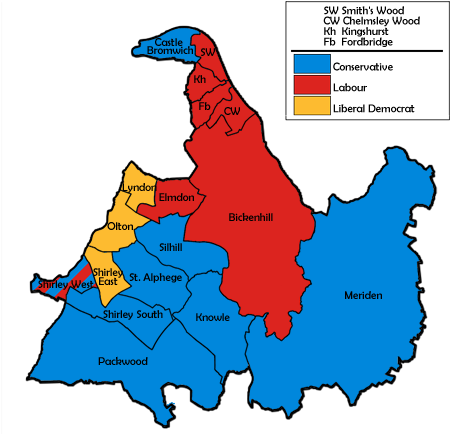
Map of the results for the 1998 Solihull council election.

The 1998 Solihull Metropolitan Borough Council election took place on 7 May 1998 to elect members of Solihull Metropolitan Borough Council in the West Midlands, England. One third of the council was up for election and the council stayed under no overall control.

== Campaign ==
Before the election the Conservative party held 17 seats, compared to 16 for Labour and 12 Liberal Democrats. However the council was run by the Labour party who governed with an agreement with the Liberal Democrats. With the split in seats between the parties the council was expected to remain without any party having a majority with Labour defending 6 seats, compared to 5 for the Conservatives and 4 for the Liberal Democrats. Meanwhile, the independent candidates who were defending a seat in Shirley South and 2 seats in Shirley West ward were expected to come under pressure. During the campaign another independent councillor Trevor Eames, who was not defending a seat in the election, resigned from the council after being jailed for 7 years causing a by-election to be held later in the summer.

== Election result ==
The results saw all 3 independents who were defending seats defeated, reducing the number of Independent Ratepayers on the council to 2. Labour gained 1 seat from the independents in Shirley West, while the Conservative took the other 2 in Shirley South and Shirley West. The Conservatives also won a seat from the Liberal Democrats in Packwood ward, with the former leader of the council Ken Meeson being returned to the council. Overall turnout in the election was 29%, varying between a high of 40% and a low of 15% in Smithswood ward.

Following the election the Conservatives elected a new group leader, Ted Richards, after the previous leader Ron Herd stepped down. However, despite holding 20 seats, compared to 17 for Labour and 11 for the Liberal Democrats, the Conservatives remained in opposition, with Labour running the council with support from the Liberal Democrats.

Solihull local election result 1998
Party	Seats	Gains	Losses	Net gain/loss	Seats %	Votes %	Votes	+/−
Conservative	8	3	0	+3	44.4	45.0	20,883	+7.9%
Labour	7	1	0	+1	38.9	25.4	11,809	-1.5%
Liberal Democrats	3	0	1	-1	16.7	23.3	10,831	-2.4%
Independent Ratepayers & Residents	0	0	2	-2	0.0	4.6	2,132	-3.4%
Independent	0	0	1	-1	0.0	1.7	767	+1.2%

This result had the following consequences for the total number of seats on the council after the elections :

Party	Previous council	New council
Conservatives	17	20
Labour	16	17
Liberal Democrat	12	11
Independent Ratepayers & Residents	5	3
Independent	1	0
Total	51	51
Working majority	-17	-11

== Ward results ==
Bickenhill
Party	Candidate	Votes	%	±%
Labour	James Ryan	2,036	58.5	+21.4
Conservative	Robert Sleigh	1,278	36.7	−11.6
Liberal Democrats	D. Moore	167	4.8	−1.8
Majority		758	21.8	+10.6
Turnout		3,481	35.3	+0.7
Labour hold		Swing	+16.5	

Castle Bromwich
Party	Candidate	Votes	%	±%
Conservative	Beryll Kellie	1,717	62.1	+2.4
Labour	Ann Wood	799	28.9	−2.5
Liberal Democrats	John Knight	251	9.1	+0.1
Majority		918	33.2	+5.0
Turnout		2,767	29.5	−8.1
Conservative hold		Swing	+2.5	

Chelmsley Wood
Party	Candidate	Votes	%	±%
Labour	Robert Reed	883	69.6	−3.6
Conservative	Graham Juniper	280	22.1	+3.2
Liberal Democrats	Olive Hogg	105	8.3	+0.4
Majority		603	47.6	−6.8
Turnout		1,268	16.6	−5.2
Labour hold		Swing	-3.4	

Elmdon
Party	Candidate	Votes	%	±%
Labour	Sheila Brookes	1,431	51.0	−4.0
Conservative	John Bramham	1,153	41.1	+4.9
Liberal Democrats	Barbara Harber	221	7.9	−1.0
Majority		278	9.9	−8.9
Turnout		2,805	36.1	−7.4
Labour hold		Swing	-4.4	

Fordbridge
Party	Candidate	Votes	%	±%
Labour	Arthur Harper	618	68.4	−2.2
Conservative	Neil Archer	209	23.1	+5.8
Liberal Democrats	Bernard Wright	77	8.5	+1.5
Majority		409	45.2	−8.0
Turnout		904	14.4	−6.6
Labour hold		Swing	-4.0	

Kingshurst
Party	Candidate	Votes	%	±%
Labour	Jeffrey Potts	526	44.4	−20.9
Independent Residents	Brian Carter	383	32.3	+32.3
Conservative	D. Cleghorn	227	19.1	−7.0
Liberal Democrats	Christopher Hayes	50	4.2	−4.4
Majority		143	12.1	−27.1
Turnout		1,186	20.9	−5.0
Labour hold		Swing	-26.6	

Knowle
Party	Candidate	Votes	%	±%
Conservative	Diana Holl-Allen	1,792	62.3	−1.4
Labour	David George	635	22.1	+9.3
Liberal Democrats	Brenda Chapple	448	15.6	−7.9
Majority		1,157	40.2	−0.1
Turnout		2,875	32.4	−5.0
Conservative hold		Swing	-5.3	

Lyndon
Party	Candidate	Votes	%	±%
Liberal Democrats	Norman Chapple	1,331	56.4	−1.6
Conservative	Neill Watts	677	28.7	+6.3
Labour	John Kimberley	351	14.9	−4.6
Majority		654	27.7	−7.9
Turnout		2,359	30.3	−7.1
Conservative hold		Swing	-3.9	

Meriden
Party	Candidate	Votes	%	±%
Conservative	Peter Lea	1,990	68.9	+31.0
Labour	Kenneth Harrop	551	19.1	−3.9
Liberal Democrats	Richard Morris	347	12.0	−0.6
Majority		1,439	49.8	+38.5
Turnout		2,888	32.6	−8.6
Conservative hold		Swing	+17.4	

Olton
Party	Candidate	Votes	%	±%
Liberal Democrats	John Windmill	1,710	51.9	−0.9
Conservative	Donald Jones	1,145	34.8	−5.1
Labour	Donald Bargery	283	8.6	+1.3
Independent Ratepayers	David Bayliss	156	4.7	+4.7
Majority		565	17.1	+4.2
Turnout		3,294	36.4	−6.9
Liberal Democrats hold		Swing	+2.1	

Packwood
Party	Candidate	Votes	%	±%
Conservative	Kenneth Meeson	2,119	51.7	+5.2
Liberal Democrats	Peter Lee	1,783	43.5	−4.8
Labour	Frederick Nash	199	4.9	−0.4
Majority		336	8.2	+6.4
Turnout		4,101	40.0	−3.9
Conservative gain from Liberal Democrats		Swing	+5.0	

Shirley East
Party	Candidate	Votes	%	±%
Liberal Democrats	Michael Southcombe	1,547	47.7	−2.0
Conservative	Susan Rosten	1,240	38.2	+1.3
Labour	James Burman	321	9.9	−3.5
Independent Ratepayers	Robert Gill	135	4.2	+4.2
Majority		307	9.5	−3.3
Turnout		3,243	35.1	−6.8
Liberal Democrats hold		Swing	-1.6	

Shirley South
Party	Candidate	Votes	%	±%
Conservative	David Evans	1,444	40.5	+40.5
Independent Ratepayers	Richard Jackson	1,114	31.3	−30.3
Labour	Bernard McElholm	683	19.2	−3.8
Liberal Democrats	Eric Widger	323	9.1	−6.4
Majority		330	9.3	−29.4
Turnout		3,564	27.1	−2.9
Conservative gain from Independent Ratepayers		Swing	+35.4	

Shirley West
Party	Candidate	Votes	%	±%
Conservative	Richard Lewis	1,040	32.7	+32.7
Labour	Peter Metcalfe	844	26.5	+0.1
Conservative	Stuart Davis	822		
Independent	Brenda Otton	767	24.1	+24.1
Independent	Jean Duddy	569		
Labour	Marcus Brain	541		
Independent Ratepayers	John Rogers	344	10.8	−52.0
Liberal Democrats	Linda Whitlock	189	5.9	−4.9
Majority		196	6.2	−30.3
Turnout		3,184	29.6	−2.5
Conservative gain from Independent		Swing	+16.2	
Labour gain from Independent Ratepayers		Swing		

Silhill
Party	Candidate	Votes	%	±%
Conservative	Sheila Pittaway	1,704	47.4	−0.5
Liberal Democrats	David Puckering	1,504	41.8	+4.0
Labour	Richard Sumner	389	10.8	−3.4
Majority		200	5.6	−4.5
Turnout		3,597	36.6	−4.5
Conservative hold		Swing	-2.2	

Smith's Wood
Party	Candidate	Votes	%	±%
Labour	Hugh Hendry	861	70.1	−3.8
Conservative	Timothy Vernon	261	21.3	+3.8
Liberal Democrats	Jennifer Wright	106	8.6	−0.1
Majority		600	48.9	−7.6
Turnout		1,228	15.3	−7.3
Labour hold		Swing	-3.8	

St. Alphege
Party	Candidate	Votes	%	±%
Conservative	Kathleen Wild	2,607	70.9	+7.3
Liberal Democrats	J. Herbert	672	18.3	−5.4
Labour	Arthur Brill	399	10.8	−1.9
Majority		1,935	52.6	+12.7
Turnout		3,678	33.1	−5.4
Conservative hold		Swing	+6.3	

== By-elections between 1998 and 1999 ==
Shirley South by-election 16 July 1998
Party	Candidate	Votes	%	±%
Conservative	James Boy	1,070	44.8	+4.3
Independent Ratepayer	John Rogers	612	25.6	−5.7
Labour	Bernard McElholm	437	18.3	−0.9
Liberal Democrats	Eric Widger	176	7.4	−1.7
Democratic Reform Association	Brenda Otton	92	3.8	+3.8
Majority		458	19.2	+9.9
Turnout		2,387	17.7	−9.4
Conservative gain from Independent Ratepayers		Swing	+5.0	
