= 1973 Solihull Metropolitan Borough Council election =

1973 UK local government election

The first elections to the newly created Solihull Metropolitan Borough Council were held on Thursday, 10 May 1973, with the entirety of the 51 seat council - three seats for each of the 17 wards - up for vote. The Local Government Act 1972 stipulated that the elected members were to shadow and eventually take over from the predecessor corporation on 1 April 1974. The order in which the councillors were elected dictated their term serving, with third-place candidates serving two years and up for re-election in 1975, second-placed three years expiring in 1976 and 1st-placed five years until 1978.

The election resulted in the Conservatives gaining control of the council.

== Ward results ==
Ward 1 (Elmdon)
Party	Candidate	Votes	%	±%
Conservative	Edward Barlow	2,001	61.2	N/A
Conservative	Norman Page	1,882		
Conservative	Robin McDonald	1,871		
Labour	Frederick Rivers	1,270	38.8	N/A
Labour	John Hill	1,163		
Labour	Edward Raven	1,109		
Majority		731	22.3	N/A
Turnout		3,271	35.6	N/A
Conservative win (new seat)				
Conservative win (new seat)				
Conservative win (new seat)				

Ward 2 (Knowle)
Party	Candidate	Votes	%	±%
Conservative	Audrey Godderidge	1,667	69.0	N/A
Conservative	Edward Brown	1,528		
Conservative	Thomas Morrison	1,448		
Liberal	Susan Rose	538	22.3	N/A
Labour	Alfred Gilbert	212	8.8	N/A
Labour	Peter Harris	190		
Majority		1,129	46.7	N/A
Turnout		2,417	31.7	N/A
Conservative win (new seat)				
Conservative win (new seat)				
Conservative win (new seat)				

Ward 3 (Lyndon)
Party	Candidate	Votes	%	±%
Conservative	Bertram Hodder	1,795	54.0	N/A
Conservative	Peter Duddy	1,775		
Conservative	Peter Ellis	1,699		
Labour	David Jamieson	1,531	46.0	N/A
Labour	Douglas Gray	1,516		
Labour	Norman Boston	1,347		
Majority		264	7.9	N/A
Turnout		3,326	53.0	N/A
Conservative win (new seat)				
Conservative win (new seat)				
Conservative win (new seat)				

Ward 4 (Olton)
Party	Candidate	Votes	%	±%
Liberal	John Windmill	2,102	53.6	N/A
Liberal	Norman Chapple	1,926		
Conservative	Norman Bradbeer	1,821	46.4	N/A
Liberal	John Graham	1,721		
Conservative	Peter Mitchell	1,586		
Conservative	Harry Sutton	1,498		
Majority		281	7.2	N/A
Turnout		3,923	43.8	N/A
Liberal win (new seat)				
Liberal win (new seat)				
Conservative win (new seat)				

Ward 5 (Packwood, Hockley Heath)
Party	Candidate	Votes	%	±%
Independent	Kirk Korn	1,861	53.3	N/A
Independent	Keith Pickering	1,829		
Independent	Donald Schoon	1,784		
Conservative	Anthony Bond	1,629	46.7	N/A
Conservative	Jennifer Davis	1,623		
Conservative	Mary Dingley	1,525		
Majority		232	6.6	N/A
Turnout		3,490	37.5	N/A
Independent win (new seat)				
Independent win (new seat)				
Independent win (new seat)				

Ward 6 (St. Alphege)
Party	Candidate	Votes	%	±%
Conservative	John Ledbetter	3,281	61.4	N/A
Conservative	Norman Green	3,069		
Conservative	Ronald Herd	2,916		
Liberal	Brenda Chapple	1,038	19.4	N/A
Independent	William Wright	1,025	19.2	N/A
Majority		2,243	42.0	N/A
Turnout		5,344	42.6	N/A
Conservative win (new seat)				
Conservative win (new seat)				
Conservative win (new seat)				

Ward 7 (Shirley East)
Party	Candidate	Votes	%	±%
Independent	Arthur Baverstock	1,839	55.0	N/A
Independent	Leslie Belton	1,824		
Independent	Leslie Pitt	1,755		
Conservative	Vincent Humberstone	1,502	45.0	N/A
Conservative	Joan Manuel	1,418		
Conservative	John Tresman	1,387		
Majority		337	10.1	N/A
Turnout		3,341	36.2	N/A
Independent win (new seat)				
Independent win (new seat)				
Independent win (new seat)				

Ward 8 (Shirley South)
Party	Candidate	Votes	%	±%
Conservative	Leslie Coombes	1,393	48.0	N/A
Conservative	Michael Ellis	1,254		
Conservative	Ernest Scadding	1,245		
Labour	Martin Cumella	836	28.8	N/A
Labour	John Foster	826		
Labour	Maureen Gee	763		
Independent	John Hamilton	671	23.1	N/A
Independent	Francis Thornton	650		
Independent	Arthur Knight	575		
Majority		557	19.2	N/A
Turnout		2,900	44.5	N/A
Conservative win (new seat)				
Conservative win (new seat)				
Conservative win (new seat)				

Ward 9 (Shirley West)
Party	Candidate	Votes	%	±%
Independent	Thomas Clark	1,466	64.7	N/A
Independent	Richard Lewis	1,403		
Independent	Peter Miles	1,377		
Conservative	Anthony Hawkins	800	35.3	N/A
Conservative	Pamela Howe	770		
Conservative	Derek Wadsworth	740		
Majority		666	29.4	N/A
Turnout		2,266	33.5	N/A
Independent win (new seat)				
Independent win (new seat)				
Independent win (new seat)				

Ward 10 (Silhill)
Party	Candidate	Votes	%	±%
Conservative	George Hill	2,316	59.0	N/A
Conservative	Bertram Hyde	2,284		
Conservative	Geoffrey Gibbons	2,248		
Independent	John Wall	688	17.5	N/A
Liberal	Anthony Skuce	560	14.3	N/A
Labour	Harry Hill	358	9.1	N/A
Labour	Francis Deacon	356		
Labour	John Bevan	353		
Majority		1,628	41.5	N/A
Turnout		3,922	31.3	N/A
Conservative win (new seat)				
Conservative win (new seat)				
Conservative win (new seat)				

Ward 11 (Berkswell, Balsall & Meriden)
Party	Candidate	Votes	%	±%
Conservative	Grahame Boakes	1,790	77.6	N/A
Conservative	Reginald Meddings	1,700		
Conservative	Anthony Wyldbore-Smith	1,682		
Labour	Roy Rigby	517	22.4	N/A
Majority		1,273	55.2	N/A
Turnout		2,307	33.2	N/A
Conservative win (new seat)				
Conservative win (new seat)				
Conservative win (new seat)				
