= 2019 Solihull Metropolitan Borough Council election =

2019 UK local government election

- 2 May 2019

17 (one third) out of 51 seats for the Solihull Metropolitan Borough Council 26 seats needed for a majority

	First party	Second party	Third party
Party	Conservative	Green	Liberal Democrats
Seats before	31	11	4
Seats after	26	14	6
Seat change	▼5	▲3	▲2
Popular vote	22,417	12,512	6,594
Percentage	45.9%	25.6%	13.5%
Swing	▼0.9%	▲0.5%	▲1.6%
	Fourth party	Fifth party
Party	Labour	Independent
Seats before	2	3
Seats after	3	2
Seat change	▲1	▼1
Popular vote	5,848	1,518
Percentage	12.0%	3.1%
Swing	▼3.5%
- 2019 local election results in Solihull Conservative Green Liberal Democrats Labour Independent
Council control before election
Conservative
Council control after election
Conservative

The 2019 Solihull Metropolitan Borough Council election took place on 2 May 2019 to elect members of Solihull Metropolitan Borough Council in England. This was on the same day as other local elections. Immediately before the election, the council comprised 31 Conservatives, 11 Greens, four Liberal Democrats, three independents and two Labour councillors. This included Knowle councillor Alan Rebeiro, who had left the Conservative group to sit as an independent in July 2018. The Conservatives retained their majority with 26 seats.

== Results summary ==
2019 Solihull Metropolitan Borough Council election
Party	This election			Full council			This election		
Party	Seats	Net	Seats %	Other	Total	Total %	Votes	Votes %	+/−
Conservative	8	▼5	47.1	18	26	51.0	22,417	45.9	
Green	5	▲3	29.4	9	14	27.5	12,512	25.6	
Liberal Democrats	2	▲2	11.8	4	6	11.8	6,594	13.5	
Labour	1	▲1	5.9	2	3	5.9	5,848	12.0	
Independent	1	Steady	5.9	1	2	3.9	1,518	3.1	
UKIP	0	▼1	0.0	0	0	0.0	–	–	

== Ward results ==
=== Bickenhill ===
Bickenhill
Party	Candidate	Votes	%	±%
Conservative	Bob Sleigh	1,527	58.8	▲4.4
Labour Co-op	Nick Stephens	506	19.5	▲1.4
Green	Trevor Barker	380	14.6	▲7.8
Liberal Democrats	Reece Colley	185	7.1	▲7.1
Majority		1021	39.3	▲5.6
Conservative hold		Swing	▲1.5	

=== Blythe ===
Blythe
Party	Candidate	Votes	%	±%
Conservative	Ken Hawkins	2,136	70.8	▼3.3
Green	Carol Linfield	555	18.4	▲4.2
Labour	Sam Mather	326	10.8	▼0.9
Majority		1581	52.4	▼7.5
Conservative hold		Swing	▼3.8	

=== Castle Bromwich ===
Castle Bromwich
Party	Candidate	Votes	%	±%
Green	Steve Caudwell	1,971	65.5	▲61.2
Conservative	Gail Sleigh	903	30.0	▼23.1
Labour	Matt Bond	135	4.5	▼18.2
Majority		1068	35.5	N/A
Green gain from Conservative		Swing	▲42.2	

=== Chelmsley Wood ===
Chelmsley Wood
Party	Candidate	Votes	%	±%
Green	Karl Macnaughton	1,622	83.6	▲15.4
Labour	Hazel Dawkins	221	11.4	▼7.5
Conservative	David Skelding	98	5.0	▼7.9
Majority		1401	72.2	▲22.9
Green hold		Swing	▲11.5	

=== Dorridge & Hockley Heath ===
Dorridge & Hockley Heath
Party	Candidate	Votes	%	±%
Conservative	Andy Mackiewicz	1,968	63.6	▼8.3
Green	Iona McIntyre	518	16.7	▲9.4
Liberal Democrats	Paul Fairburn	406	13.1	▲0.8
Labour	David Brittin	202	6.5	▼2.0
Majority		1450	46.9	▼12.8
Conservative hold		Swing	▼8.9	

=== Elmdon ===
Elmdon
Party	Candidate	Votes	%	±%
Liberal Democrats	Peter Davies	1,383	49.3	▲30.9
Conservative	Martin McCarthy	1,152	41.1	▲9.7
Labour	Margaret Brittin	269	9.6	▼0.5
Majority		231	8.2	N/A
Liberal Democrats gain from Conservative		Swing	▲10.6	

=== Kingshurst & Fordbridge ===
Kingshurst & Fordbridge
Party	Candidate	Votes	%	±%
Labour	Marcus Brain	616	39.9	▲9.3
Conservative	Alan Feeney	575	37.3	▲10.3
Green	Eleanor Aldworth	352	22.8	▲16.1
Majority		41	2.7	N/A
Labour gain from UKIP		Swing	▼0.5	

=== Knowle ===
Knowle
Party	Candidate	Votes	%	±%
Independent	Alan Rebeiro	1,415	41.3	▲41.3
Conservative	Dave Pinwell	1,386	40.5	▼33.1
Green	Alison Wilson	239	7.0	▼7.5
Liberal Democrats	Antony Rogers	198	5.8	▲5.8
Labour	Simon Johnson	187	5.5	▼6.4
Majority		29	0.8	N/A
Independent gain from Conservative		Swing	▲37.2	

=== Lyndon ===
Lyndon
Party	Candidate	Votes	%	±%
Liberal Democrats	Kathryn Thomas	1,086	37.8	▲4.4
Conservative	Josh O'Nyons	1,077	37.5	▼1.2
Labour	Lee Skinner	708	24.7	▲5.0
Majority		9	0.3	N/A
Liberal Democrats gain from Conservative		Swing	▲2.8	

=== Meriden ===
Meriden
Party	Candidate	Votes	%	±%
Conservative	Diane Howell	2,084	64.7	▲0.8
Green	Mark Pearson	473	14.7	▲7.4
Liberal Democrats	Michael Carthew	348	10.8	▲10.8
Labour	Teresa Beddis	315	9.8	▼4.4
Majority		1611	50.0	▲0.7
Conservative hold		Swing	▼3.3	

=== Olton ===
Olton
Party	Candidate	Votes	%	±%
Conservative	Bob Grinsell	1,693	48.4	▲1.1
Liberal Democrats	Brad Tucker	1,353	38.7	▲5.8
Labour	Colin Palmer	452	12.9	▲1.1
Majority		340	9.7	▼4.7
Conservative hold		Swing	▼2.4	

=== Shirley East ===
Shirley East
Party	Candidate	Votes	%	±%
Conservative	Mark Parker	1,535	56.6	▲3.5
Liberal Democrats	Gayle Monk	443	16.3	▼6.7
Green	Antony Lowe	437	16.1	▲6.4
Labour	Deon Bailey	296	10.9	▼3.3
Majority		1092	40.3	▲10.2
Conservative hold		Swing	▲5.1	

=== Shirley South ===
Shirley South
Party	Candidate	Votes	%	±%
Green	Shahin Ashraf	2,206	61.5	▲40.4
Conservative	Angela Sandison	1,137	31.7	▼9.4
Labour	Susan Bliss	242	6.8	▼2.3
Majority		1069	29.8	N/A
Green gain from Conservative		Swing	▲24.9	

=== Shirley West ===
Shirley West
Party	Candidate	Votes	%	±%
Green	Rosemary Sexton	1,876	61.0	▲35.4
Conservative	Brian Holmes	746	24.3	▼9.1
Labour	Kevin Round	453	14.7	▲3.4
Majority		1,130	36.7	N/A
Green gain from Conservative		Swing	▲22.3	

=== Silhill ===
Silhill
Party	Candidate	Votes	%	±%
Conservative	Wazma Qais	1,621	53.1	▼4.9
Liberal Democrats	James Edwardson	607	19.9	▼4.1
Green	Elaine Williams	418	13.7	▲7.6
Labour Co-op	Janet Marsh	409	13.4	▲1.5
Majority		1014	33.2	▼0.8
Conservative hold		Swing	▼0.4	

=== Smith's Wood ===
Smith's Wood
Party	Candidate	Votes	%	±%
Green	Mark Wilson	1,070	70.1	▲8.9
Labour	Bill Lloyd	226	14.8	▼9.4
Conservative	Angus Young	128	8.4	▼6.2
Independent	Adrian Duffen	103	6.7	▲6.7
Majority		844	55.3	▲18.3
Green hold		Swing	▲9.2	

=== St. Alphege ===
St. Alphege
Party	Candidate	Votes	%	±%
Conservative	Joe Tildesley	2,651	67.7	▼1.1
Liberal Democrats	Bruce Stone	585	14.9	▼1.9
Green	Joelle Hill	395	10.1	▲3.9
Labour	Ian English	285	7.3	▼0.8
Majority		2066	52.8	▲0.8
Conservative hold		Swing	▲0.4	

== Changes between 2019 and 2021 ==
- August 2020: Peter Davies, a Liberal Democrat councillor for Elmdon, resigned for personal reasons. The vacancy remained unfilled until the 2021 election because local polls had been postponed during the COVID-19 pandemic.

No by-elections were held between the 2019 and 2021 elections. The Elmdon vacancy was filled at the 2021 ordinary election, when the ward elected two councillors.
