= 1984 Solihull Metropolitan Borough Council election =

1984 UK local government election

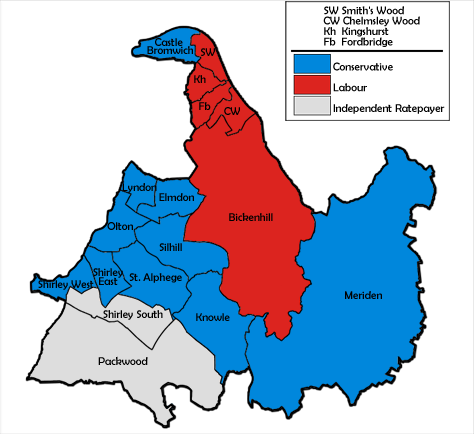
Map of the results for the 1984 Solihull council election.

The 1984 Solihull Metropolitan Borough Council elections were held on Thursday, 3 May 1984, with one third of the council seats up for election and a double vacancy in the Shirley West ward. The Conservatives retained control of the council. Voter turnout was 35.2%

== Election result ==
Solihull local election result 1984
Party	Seats	Gains	Losses	Net gain/loss	Seats %	Votes %	Votes	+/−
Conservative	11	0	0	0	61.1	48.4	25,459	
Labour	5	0	0	0	27.8	27.5	14,494	
Independent Ratepayers & Residents	2	0	0	0	11.1	8.1	4,285	
Alliance	0	0	0	0	0.0	14.9	7,861	
Traditional Labour	0	0	0	0	0.0	0.8	441	
National Front	0	0	0	0	0.0	0.1	70	

This result had the following consequences for the total number of seats on the council after the elections:

Party	Previous council	New council
Conservatives	33	33
Labour	13	13
Independent Ratepayers & Residents	4	4
Alliance	1	1
Total	51	51
Working majority	15	15

== Ward results ==
Bickenhill
Party	Candidate	Votes	%	±%
Labour	James Ryan	2,083	50.5	
Conservative	Graham Juniper	1,702	41.3	
Alliance (Liberal)	David Moore	272	6.6	
Independent Ratepayers	John Keight	64	1.5	
Majority		381	9.2	
Turnout		4,121	47.2	
Labour hold		Swing		

Castle Bromwich
Party	Candidate	Votes	%	±%
Conservative	George Richards	2,485	68.9	
Labour	Robert Overton	1,124	31.1	
Majority		1,361	37.7	
Turnout		3,609	39.7	
Conservative hold		Swing		

Chelmsley Wood
Party	Candidate	Votes	%	±%
Labour	Alfred Hill	1,894	75.5	
Conservative	Michael Wyldbore-Smith	615	24.5	
Majority		1,279	51.0	
Turnout		2,509	28.1	
Labour hold		Swing		

Elmdon
Party	Candidate	Votes	%	±%
Conservative	Norman Page	1,452	48.1	
Labour	Ian Jamieson	960	31.8	
Alliance (Liberal)	Robert Kirkham	607	20.1	
Majority		492	16.3	
Turnout		3,019	33.5	
Conservative hold		Swing		

Fordbridge
Party	Candidate	Votes	%	±%
Labour	Michael Corser	1,101	55.5	
Conservative	David Scott	442	22.3	
Traditional Labour	James O'Callaghan	441	22.2	
Majority		659	33.2	
Turnout		1,984	26.1	
Labour hold		Swing		

Kingshurst
Party	Candidate	Votes	%	±%
Labour	Nigel Haslewood	1,606	66.6	
Conservative	Dorothy Wallace	806	33.4	
Majority		800	33.2	
Turnout		2,412	34.3	
Labour hold		Swing		

Knowle
Party	Candidate	Votes	%	±%
Conservative	Ronald Scannell	2,017	66.2	
Alliance (SDP)	Celia Marshall	821	26.9	
Labour	Simon Johnson	209	6.9	
Majority		1,196	39.2	
Turnout		3,047	37.6	
Conservative hold		Swing		

Lyndon
Party	Candidate	Votes	%	±%
Conservative	Peter Duddy	1,463	44.3	
Alliance (Liberal)	Ian Gillett	1,083	32.8	
Labour	Sean Gilmore	759	23.0	
Majority		380	11.5	
Turnout		3,305	40.4	
Conservative hold		Swing		

Meriden
Party	Candidate	Votes	%	±%
Conservative	Alan Vincent	1,820	56.5	
Alliance (SDP)	Arthur Crossley	1,117	34.7	
Labour	Thomas Hayes	282	8.8	
Majority		703	21.8	
Turnout		3,219	40.1	
Conservative hold		Swing		

Olton
Party	Candidate	Votes	%	±%
Conservative	Diana Holl-Allen	1,893	51.8	
Alliance (Liberal)	John Windmill	1,411	38.6	
Labour	Warren McDivitt	353	9.6	
Majority		482	13.2	
Turnout		3,657	38.5	
Conservative hold		Swing		

Packwood
Party	Candidate	Votes	%	±%
Independent	Kenneth Meeson	1,887	49.9	
Conservative	Peter Tebbit	1,711	45.3	
Labour	Harry Challis	181	4.8	
Majority		176	4.7	
Turnout		3,779	41.7	
Independent hold		Swing		

Shirley East
Party	Candidate	Votes	%	±%
Conservative	Francis Toye	1,711	53.5	
Independent	Anthony Ebden	1,042	32.6	
Labour	Peter McLouchlin	443	13.9	
Majority		669	20.9	
Turnout		3,196	33.1	
Conservative hold		Swing		

Shirley South
Party	Candidate	Votes	%	±%
Independent	Eric Pemberton	1,292	46.7	
Conservative	Anthony Bennett	1,111	40.1	
Labour	Barry Beattie	364	13.2	
Majority		181	6.5	
Turnout		2,767	30.2	
Independent hold		Swing		

Shirley West
Party	Candidate	Votes	%	±%
Conservative	Sylvia McCulloch	1,332	49.0	
Conservative	Keith Samuels	1,262		
Alliance (SDP)	David Delve	771	28.4	
Alliance (SDP)	Carol Lea	658		
Labour	Roy May	545	20.0	
Labour	Susan Knowles	526		
National Front	Norman Tomkinson	70	2.6	
Majority		561	20.6	
Turnout		2,718	28.0	
Conservative hold		Swing		
Conservative hold		Swing		

Silhill
Party	Candidate	Votes	%	±%
Conservative	Bertram Hyde	1,969	59.9	
Alliance (SDP)	Karol Bard	904	27.5	
Labour	Alfred Porter	413	12.6	
Majority		1,065	32.4	
Turnout		3,286	32.2	
Conservative hold		Swing		

Smith's Wood
Party	Candidate	Votes	%	±%
Labour	Derrick Harrison	2,010	78.0	
Conservative	Robin Draycott	568	22.0	
Majority		1,442	55.9	
Turnout		2,578	29.0	
Labour hold		Swing		

St. Alphege
Party	Candidate	Votes	%	±%
Conservative	Norman Green	2,362	69.4	
Alliance (Liberal)	Carol Lindfield	875	25.7	
Labour	Frederick Hislop	167	4.9	
Majority		1,487	43.7	
Turnout		3,404	38.8	
Conservative hold		Swing		
