= 2018 Solihull Metropolitan Borough Council election =

2018 local election in England

- 3 May 2018

17 (one third) out of 51 seats for the Solihull Metropolitan Borough Council 26 seats needed for a majority

	First party	Second party	Third party
Party	Conservative	Green	Liberal Democrats
Seats before	32	10	6
Seats after	33	11	4
Seat change	▲1	▲1	▼2
Popular vote	24,720	13,254	6,297
Percentage	46.8%	25.1%	11.9%
Swing	▼0.9%	▲5.0%	▲0.7%
	Fourth party	Fifth party
Party	Labour	UKIP
Seats before	1	1
Seats after	2	0
Seat change	▲1	▼1
Popular vote	8,219	375
Percentage	15.5%	0.7%
Swing	▼1.5%	▼3.5%
- 2018 local election results in Solihull Conservative Green Liberal Democrats Labour
Council control before election
Conservative
Council control after election
Conservative

The 2018 Solihull Metropolitan Borough Council election took place on 3 May 2018 to elect members of Solihull Metropolitan Borough Council in England. This was on the same day as other local elections.

== Council results ==
2018 Solihull Council election
Party	Candidates						Votes		
Party	Stood	Elected	Gained	Unseated	Net	% of total	%	No.	Net %
Conservative	17	10	2	1	▲1	58.8	46.8	24,720	▼0.9
Green	14	5	1	0	▲1	29.4	25.1	13,254	▲5.0
Labour	17	1	1	0	▲1	5.9	15.5	8,219	▲1.5
Liberal Democrats	10	1	0	2	▼2	5.9	11.9	6,297	▲0.7
UKIP	2	0	0	1	▼1	0.0	0.7	375	▼3.5

== Ward results ==
=== Bickenhill ===
Bickenhill
Party	Candidate	Votes	%	±%
Conservative	Alison Rolf	1,571	61.4	
Labour	Joe Wood	702	27.4	
Green	Stephen Caudwell	172	6.7	
Liberal Democrats	Reece Colley	115	4.5	

=== Blythe ===
Blythe
Party	Candidate	Votes	%	±%
Conservative	Richard Holt	1,993	67.7	
Labour	Sardul Marwa	405	13.8	
Liberal Democrats	Charles Robinson	274	9.3	
Green	Jo Hodgson	270	9.2	

=== Castle Bromwich ===
Castle Bromwich
Party	Candidate	Votes	%	±%
Green	Cheryl Buxton-Sait	2,254	64.1	▲60.5
Conservative	Mike Robinson	941	26.8	▼15.7
Labour	Emma Chidler	319	9.1	▼3.6
Majority		1,313	37.3	N/A
Registered electors		9,286		
Turnout		3,519	37.9	
Rejected ballots		5	0.1	
Green gain from Conservative		Swing	▲45.6	

=== Chelmsley Wood ===
Chelmsley Wood
Party	Candidate	Votes	%	±%
Green	James Burn	1,517	77.9	▲2.7
Labour	Hazel Dawkins	278	14.3	▲4.1
Conservative	David Skelding	152	7.8	▲3.7
Majority		1,239	63.6	▼1.1
Registered electors		8,862		
Turnout		1,955	22.1	
Rejected ballots		8	0.4	
Green hold		Swing	▼0.7	

=== Dorridge and Hockley Heath ===
Dorridge and Hockley Heath
Party	Candidate	Votes	%	±%
Conservative	Ian Courts	2,291	68.9	
Liberal Democrats	Paul Fairburn	415	12.5	
Labour	David Britain	330	9.9	
Green	Iona McIntyre	288	8.7	

=== Elmdon ===
Elmdon
Party	Candidate	Votes	%	±%
Liberal Democrats	Laura McCarthy	1,282	43.6	
Conservative	Catherine Price	1221	41.5	
Labour	Steve Gulati	440	15.0	

=== Kingshurst and Fordbridge ===
Kingshurst and Fordbridge
Party	Candidate	Votes	%	±%
Labour	David Cole	784	47.0	
Conservative	Diane Howell	575	34.5	
UKIP	Debbie Evans	225	13.5	
Green	Carol Linfield	84	5.0	

=== Knowle ===
Knowle
Party	Candidate	Votes	%	±%
Conservative	Diana Holl-Allen	2,316	72.6	▲3.8
Labour	Simon Johnson	381	12.0	▲0.1
Liberal Democrats	Antony Rogers	254	8.0	▲1.0
Green	Alison Wilson	237	7.4	▼4.8
Majority		1,935	60.7	▲4.1
Registered electors		8,291		
Turnout		3,194	38.5	
Rejected ballots		6	0.2	
Conservative hold		Swing	{{{swing}}}	

=== Lyndon ===
Lyndon
Party	Candidate	Votes	%	±%
Conservative	Paul Thomas	1,184	40.4	
Liberal Democrats	James Edwardson	915	31.2	
Labour	Marcus Brain	834	28.4	

=== Meriden ===
Meriden
Party	Candidate	Votes	%	±%
Conservative	Ken Allsopp	2,231	72.6	
Labour	Teresa Beddis	446	14.5	
Green	Mark Pearson	394	12.8	

=== Olton ===
Olton
Party	Candidate	Votes	%	±%
Conservative	Katy Blunt	1,577	42.4	
Liberal Democrats	John Windmill	1551	41.7	
Labour	Colin Palmer	593	15.9	

=== St Alphege ===
St Alphege
Party	Candidate	Votes	%	±%
Conservative	Stuart Davis	2,748	69.8	
Liberal Democrats	Kathryn Thomas	520	13.2	
Labour	Ian English	406	10.3	
Green	Maggie Ryan	263	6.7	

=== Shirley East ===
Shirley East
Party	Candidate	Votes	%	±%
Conservative	Annette MacKenzie	1,696	58.7	
Liberal Democrats	Gayle Monk	498	17.2	
Labour	Elizabeth Thacker	443	15.3	
Green	Eleanor Aldworth	253	8.8	

=== Shirley South ===
Shirley South
Party	Candidate	Votes	%	±%
Green	Andy Hodgson	2,215	60.3	▲17.8
Conservative	Wazma Qais	1,084	29.5	▼8.0
Labour	Susan Bliss	377	10.3	▲3.7
Majority		1,131	30.8	▲25.8
Registered electors		9,754		
Turnout		3,686	37.8	
Rejected ballots		10	0.3	
Green hold		Swing	▲12.9	

=== Shirley West ===
Shirley West
Party	Candidate	Votes	%	±%
Green	Tim Hodgson	1,636	52.5	▼4.5
Conservative	Jamil Ahmed	869	27.9	▼0.1
Labour Co-op	Nick Stephens	611	19.6	▲9.8
Majority		767	24.6	▼4.4
Registered electors		9,581		
Turnout		3,123	32.6	
Rejected ballots		7	0.2	
Green hold		Swing	▼2.2	

=== Silhill ===
Silhill
Party	Candidate	Votes	%	±%
Conservative	Michael Gough	2,097	63.6	
Labour	Janet Marsh	526	16.0	
Liberal Democrats	Bruce Stone	473	14.4	
Green	Trevor Barker	200	6.1	

=== Smiths Wood ===
Smiths Wood
Party	Candidate	Votes	%	±%
Green	Ben Groom	986	59.6	▼4.2
Labour	Lee Skinner	344	20.8	▲3.0
Conservative	Angus Young	174	10.5	▲5.8
UKIP	Adrian Duffen	150	9.1	▼3.8
Majority		642	38.8	▼7.2
Registered electors		8,317		
Turnout		1,656	19.9	
Rejected ballots		2	0.1	
Green hold		Swing	▼3.6	
