= 2008 Solihull Metropolitan Borough Council election =

2008 UK local government election

(2007 ←) 2008 United Kingdom local elections (→ 2010)

Map of the results of the 2008 Solihull election. Conservatives in blue, Liberal Democrats in yellow, Labour in red, Green party in green.

The 2008 Solihull Metropolitan Borough Council election took place on 1 May 2008 to elect members of Solihull Metropolitan Borough Council in the West Midlands, England. One third of the council was up for election and the Conservative Party gained overall control of the council from no overall control.

== Campaign ==
17 seats were contested in the election, with the Conservatives, Liberal Democrats, Labour and Green parties contesting every ward. The British National Party had 12 candidates, up from 5 in the 2007 election, the UK Independence Party stood 9 candidates and the sole Independent stood in St Alphege, having previously won a seat there in a 2005 by-election for the Conservatives. Among those standing were Jim Ryan, defending Bickenhill as a Conservative, having previously won it as an Independent after over twenty years of being a Labour councillor there, Howard Allen returned to the Liberal Democrats to defend his seat in Shirley West, after time as an Independent and Peter Hogarth in Silhill where he had lost his seat in 2007. Meanwhile, 2 councillors stood down at the election, Conservative Susan Gomm and Liberal Democrat June Gandy from Silhill and Shirley East wards respectively.

The Conservatives had lost their majority on the council at the 2007 election but continued to run it as a minority administration. During the campaign the Conservative Party leader David Cameron visited Solihull, saying that the council was well run under the Conservatives and that they were hopeful of making gains. The Liberal Democrats criticised the record of the council on recycling, said they would create more activities for young people to take part in and called for the Liberal Democrats to be represented in the council's cabinet. Meanwhile, Labour said its councillors had a strong impact on the council and had been involved in getting the regeneration project for northern Solihull started.

== Election results ==
The results saw the Conservatives regain a majority on the council after making 2 gains. The Conservatives gained Kingshurst and Fordbridge from Labour and Blythe from the Liberal Democrats, while Jim Ryan was re-elected as a Conservative in Bickenhill. This meant the Conservatives took a 1-seat majority with 26 of the 51 councillors, although they did lose 1 seat to the Liberal Democrats in Elmdon.

Meanwhile, the Green Party won a first seat on the council after winning Smith's Wood ward by 331 votes. The Green's Mike Sheridan defeated the Labour leader on the council, Hugh Hendry, who had been a councillor for 18 years. Sheridan thus became the first Green councillor in the West Midlands conurbation and one of only 4 in the whole Midlands, after a campaign that he said focused on regeneration and preserving green space.

Solihull local election result 2008
Party	Seats	Gains	Losses	Net gain/loss	Seats %	Votes %	Votes	+/−
Conservative	10	2	1	+1	58.8	47.7	27,080	+2.4
Liberal Democrats	5	1	1	0	29.4	27.4	15,576	-6.2
Labour	1	0	2	-2	5.9	8.0	4,532	-1.8
Green	1	1	0	+1	5.9	4.7	2,651	-0.4
BNP	0	0	0	0	0.0	8.9	5,068	+4.6
UKIP	0	0	0	0	0.0	2.3	1,330	+1.2
Independent	0	0	0	0	0.0	1.0	592	+0.2

This result had the following consequences for the total number of seats on the council after the elections :

Party	Previous council	New council
Conservatives	25	26
Liberal Democrat	18	18
Labour	7	5
BNP	1	1
Green	0	1
Total	51	51
Working majority	-1	1

== Ward results ==
Bickenhill
Party	Candidate	Votes	%	±%
Conservative	Jim Ryan	2,106	66.6	+0.9
BNP	Patricia Allington	419	13.2	+13.2
Labour	Ian McDonald	323	10.2	−5.8
Liberal Democrats	Brenda Davies	187	5.9	−4.3
Green	Alexander Hawkeswood	128	4.0	−4.1
Majority		1,687	53.3	+3.6
Turnout		3,163		
Conservative hold		Swing	-6.1	

Blythe
Party	Candidate	Votes	%	±%
Conservative	Martin McCarthy	1,714	48.3	+6.6
Liberal Democrats	Maggie Allen	1,647	46.4	−3.7
Labour	Raj Singh	112	3.2	−1.1
Green	Moustafa Osman	79	2.2	−1.7
Majority		67	1.9	−6.6
Turnout		3,552		
Conservative gain from Liberal Democrats		Swing	+5.1	

Castle Bromwich
Party	Candidate	Votes	%	±%
Conservative	Ted Richards	2,118	67.7	+4.5
BNP	Marcus Higgins	410	13.1	+13.1
Labour	Kieran Dooley	285	9.1	+9.1
Liberal Democrats	Andrew Bull	230	7.3	−21.4
Green	Iain MacNaughton	87	2.8	−5.4
Majority		1,708	54.6	+20.1
Turnout		3,130		
Conservative hold		Swing	-4.3	

Chelmsley Wood
Party	Candidate	Votes	%	±%
Labour	Alfred Hill	698	32.4	−6.5
Conservative	Gail Sleigh	634	29.4	+12.0
BNP	Andrew Terry	565	26.2	−4.5
Liberal Democrats	Bernard Wright	139	6.5	−0.9
Green	Ronnie Cashmore	118	5.5	−0.1
Majority		64	3.0	−5.2
Turnout		2,154		
Labour hold		Swing	-9.2	

Dorridge and Hockley Heath
Party	Candidate	Votes	%	±%
Conservative	Ken Meeson	2,440	65.9	−4.7
Liberal Democrats	Howard Knight	635	17.2	+1.4
BNP	Andrew Taylor	273	7.4	+7.4
Green	Sara Stevens	222	6.0	−3.3
Labour	Irma Shaw	131	3.5	−0.9
Majority		1,805	48.8	−6.0
Turnout		3,702		
Conservative hold		Swing	-3.0	

Elmdon
Party	Candidate	Votes	%	±%
Liberal Democrats	Glenis Slater	1,596	40.4	−7.9
Conservative	John Bramham	1,375	34.8	+0.9
BNP	George Rouse	602	15.2	+7.0
Labour	Lorraine Essex	209	5.3	−1.8
UKIP	David Hossell	101	2.6	+2.6
Green	Elaine Williams	68	1.7	−0.9
Majority		221	5.6	−8.8
Turnout		3,951		
Liberal Democrats gain from Conservative		Swing	-4.4	

Kingshurst and Fordbridge
Party	Candidate	Votes	%	±%
Conservative	Debbie Evans	749	37.2	+7.4
Labour	John Kimberley	606	30.1	−2.2
BNP	Graham Pringle	464	23.1	−5.7
Liberal Democrats	Jennifer Wright	125	6.2	+0.4
Green	Scott Rhodes	67	3.3	+0.0
Majority		143	7.1	+4.6
Turnout		2,011		
Conservative gain from Labour		Swing	+4.8	

Knowle
Party	Candidate	Votes	%	±%
Conservative	Jeff Potts	2,342	63.4	−6.1
Liberal Democrats	Geoffrey Berry	584	15.8	−3.4
BNP	Frank O'Brien	371	10.0	+10.0
Green	Jane Holt	179	4.8	−3.0
Labour	Catherine Connan	136	3.7	+0.3
UKIP	Mark Penny	83	2.2	+2.2
Majority		1,758	47.6	−2.7
Turnout		3,695		
Conservative hold		Swing	-1.3	

Lyndon
Party	Candidate	Votes	%	±%
Liberal Democrats	Irene Chamberlain	1,673	48.8	−4.4
Conservative	Greg Goldingay	895	26.1	−0.6
BNP	Russell Phillips	436	12.7	+12.7
Labour	Margaret Brittin	212	6.2	−1.2
UKIP	Ray Mabbott	128	3.7	−3.0
Green	Frances Grice	85	2.5	−3.5
Majority		778	22.7	−3.8
Turnout		3,429		
Liberal Democrats hold		Swing	-1.9	

Meriden
Party	Candidate	Votes	%	±%
Conservative	Peter Lea	2,564	72.0	+1.6
Liberal Democrats	Ann Berry	321	9.0	−3.5
Labour	Arthur Davis	264	7.4	−3.7
BNP	Wesley Jones	237	6.7	+6.7
Green	Nigel Dyer	176	4.9	−1.1
Majority		2,243	63.0	+5.0
Turnout		3,562		
Conservative hold		Swing	+2.5	

Olton
Party	Candidate	Votes	%	±%
Liberal Democrats	Honor Cox	1,938	53.8	−6.4
Conservative	Helen Eyre	1,198	33.3	+2.3
UKIP	Lydia Simpson	180	5.0	+5.0
Labour	Alan Jacques	169	4.7	+0.1
Green	Roger King	114	3.2	−0.9
Majority		740	20.6	−8.7
Turnout		3,599		
Liberal Democrats hold		Swing	-4.3	

Shirley East
Party	Candidate	Votes	%	±%
Liberal Democrats	Sue Rose	1,522	44.3	−2.5
Conservative	Mark Parker	1,455	42.4	+10.4
UKIP	Jayne Hall	196	5.7	+5.7
Labour	Kevin Raven	183	5.3	−0.6
Green	Olga Farooqui	79	2.3	−1.2
Majority		67	2.0	−12.8
Turnout		3,435		
Liberal Democrats hold		Swing	-6.4	

Shirley South
Party	Candidate	Votes	%	±%
Conservative	Gary Allport	1,506	38.5	+5.2
Liberal Democrats	Nick John	1,449	37.0	−10.1
BNP	Charles Shipman	541	13.8	+4.6
Labour	Shirley Young	187	4.8	−0.4
UKIP	Linda Brown	170	4.3	+2.5
Green	Angela Henery	59	1.5	−0.2
Majority		57	1.5	−12.2
Turnout		3,912		
Conservative hold		Swing	+7.6	

Shirley West
Party	Candidate	Votes	%	±%
Liberal Democrats	Howard Allen	1,424	43.9	−6.1
Conservative	Dennis Eyre	873	26.9	−2.3
BNP	Tony Greenshields	394	12.1	+12.1
UKIP	Nikki Sinclaire	276	8.5	−1.3
Labour	Nick Stephens	158	4.9	−1.4
Green	Trevor Barker	118	3.6	−1.1
Majority		551	17.0	−3.9
Turnout		3,243		
Liberal Democrats hold		Swing	-1.9	

Silhill
Party	Candidate	Votes	%	±%
Conservative	Peter Hogarth	2,055	49.6	+8.9
Liberal Democrats	Tony Dupont	1,417	34.2	−9.2
BNP	Alan Ashmore	356	8.6	−0.7
Labour	Janet Marsh	175	4.2	−1.1
Green	Clair Garbett	74	1.8	+0.5
UKIP	Christopher Boxall	64	1.5	+1.5
Majority		638	15.4	+12.7
Turnout		4,141		
Conservative hold		Swing	+9.0	

Smith's Wood
Party	Candidate	Votes	%	±%
Green	Mike Sheridan	881	45.2	+36.6
Labour	Hugh Hendry	550	28.2	−19.8
Conservative	Jim Williams	420	21.5	−10.4
Liberal Democrats	Anthony Ludlow	98	5.0	−6.4
Majority		331	17.0	+0.8
Turnout		1,949		
Green gain from Labour		Swing	+28.2	

St. Alphege
Party	Candidate	Votes	%	±%
Conservative	Kate Wild	2,636	62.7	−3.1
Independent	Theresa Tedd	592	14.1	+14.1
Liberal Democrats	Mamdoch Jalil	591	14.1	−9.1
Labour	Paul Tuxworth	134	3.2	−2.1
UKIP	David Faulkner	132	3.1	+3.1
Green	James Hepton	117	2.8	−2.9
Majority		2,044	48.6	+6.0
Turnout		4,202		
Conservative hold		Swing	-8.6	
