= 2003 Solihull Metropolitan Borough Council election =

2003 UK local government election

(2002 ←) 2003 United Kingdom local elections (→ 2004)

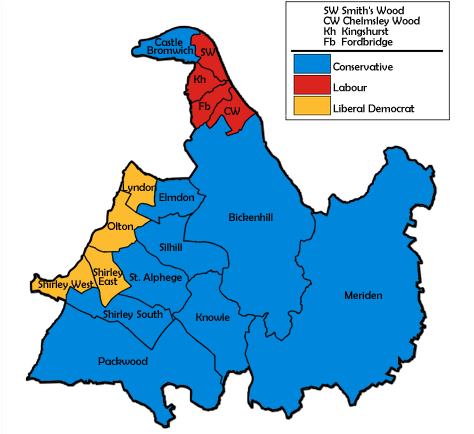
Map of the results for the 2003 Solihull council election.

The 2003 Solihull Metropolitan Borough Council election took place on 1 May 2003 to elect members of Solihull Metropolitan Borough Council in the West Midlands, England. One third of the council was up for election and the Conservative Party stayed in overall control of the council.

== Campaign ==
Before the election the Conservatives ran the council with 28 seats, compared to 13 for Labour and 10 for the Liberal Democrats, with 17 seats being contested in the election. The election came after a by-election in Shirley West ward in March 2003, which saw the Liberal Democrats gain the seat on a swing of 26%, making that ward a key seat in the election.

Issues in the election included broad opposition to windfall development, while Labour campaigned on a north–south divide they said was evident in the council. Proposals for the expansion of Birmingham Airport divided the parties, with the Conservatives and Liberal Democrats opposing expansion, while almost all Labour councillors supported it. A recent increase in council tax of 11% was another issue in the election, with the ruling Conservative group blaming the increase on the national Labour government due to a change in the grant, but the Labour Local Government Minister Nick Raynsford said the increase was double that of other local Labour controlled councils.

== Election result ==
The results saw the Conservatives keep a 5-seat majority on the council. The Conservatives gained one seat from the Liberal Democrats in Packwood ward, but lost another one back to the Liberal Democrats in Shirley West.

Solihull local election result 2003
Party	Seats	Gains	Losses	Net gain/loss	Seats %	Votes %	Votes	+/−
Conservative	9	1	1	0	52.9	51.3	22,557	+2.1%
Liberal Democrats	4	1	1	0	23.5	30.8	13,524	+3.7%
Labour	4	0	0	0	23.5	17.9	7,850	-5.8%

This result had the following consequences for the total number of seats on the council after the elections :

Party	Previous council	New council
Conservatives	28	28
Labour	13	13
Liberal Democrat	10	10
Total	51	51
Working majority	5	5

== Ward results ==
Bickenhill
Party	Candidate	Votes	%	±%
Conservative	Alan Martin	1,765	67.9	+27.8
Labour	Florence Nash	747	28.7	−25.5
Liberal Democrats	Douglas Hogg	89	3.4	−2.3
Majority		1,018	39.1	−25.0
Turnout		2,601	25.2	−10.5
Conservative hold		Swing	+26.6	

Castle Bromwich
Party	Candidate	Votes	%	±%
Conservative	Robin Draycott	1,731	66.8	+1.4
Labour	James Moore	589	22.7	−1.6
Liberal Democrats	Geoffrey Daniell	270	10.4	+0.1
Majority		1,142	44.1	+3.1
Turnout		2,590	28.2	−3.6
Conservative hold		Swing	+1.5	

Chelmsley Wood
Party	Candidate	Votes	%	±%
Labour	Nicholas Stephens	719	58.8	−3.4
Conservative	Martin McCarthy	330	27.0	+2.8
Liberal Democrats	Jennifer Wright	173	14.2	+0.6
Majority		389	31.8	−6.2
Turnout		1,222	16.9	−2.7
Labour hold		Swing	-3.1	

Elmdon
Party	Candidate	Votes	%	±%
Conservative	John Bramham	1,268	48.1	+3.4
Liberal Democrats	Nigel Dyer	864	32.8	+18.6
Labour	Frederick Churchill	502	19.1	−22.0
Majority		404	15.3	+11.6
Turnout		2,634	33.8	−3.9
Conservative hold		Swing	-7.6	

Fordbridge
Party	Candidate	Votes	%	±%
Labour	Kenneth Harrop	485	56.1	−5.2
Conservative	Michael Robinson	252	29.2	+2.5
Liberal Democrats	Christopher Hayes	127	14.7	+2.6
Majority		233	27.0	−7.6
Turnout		864	15.0	−4.8
Labour hold		Swing	-3.8	

Kingshurst
Party	Candidate	Votes	%	±%
Labour	John Kimberley	669	59.8	−3.5
Conservative	David Plaister	360	32.2	+5.4
Liberal Democrats	Bernard Wright	90	8.0	−2.0
Majority		309	27.6	−8.9
Turnout		1,119	20.7	−3.1
Labour hold		Swing	-4.4	

Knowle
Party	Candidate	Votes	%	±%
Conservative	James Blake	2,173	71.4	+6.1
Liberal Democrats	David Small	563	18.5	−3.0
Labour	Patricia Harrop	307	10.1	−3.1
Majority		1,610	52.9	+9.1
Turnout		3,043	34.9	−2.0
Conservative hold		Swing	+4.5	

Lyndon
Party	Candidate	Votes	%	±%
Liberal Democrats	Olive Hogg	1,479	67.3	+1.9
Conservative	Gary Allport	441	20.1	+0.4
Labour	Catherine Connan	279	12.7	−2.2
Majority		1,038	47.2	+1.6
Turnout		2,199	28.9	−2.9
Liberal Democrats hold		Swing	+0.7	

Meriden
Party	Candidate	Votes	%	±%
Conservative	Kenneth Allsopp	2,054	64.2	−5.4
Labour	Jonathan Maltman	581	18.2	+1.7
Liberal Democrats	Peter Whitlock	563	17.6	+3.6
Majority		1,473	46.1	−7.0
Turnout		3,198	34.0	−2.0
Conservative hold		Swing	-3.5	

Olton
Party	Candidate	Votes	%	±%
Liberal Democrats	Honor Cox	1,953	63.4	+1.6
Conservative	Jeffrey Stocks	942	30.6	+0.2
Labour	Rajeshwar Singh	187	6.1	−1.7
Majority		1,011	32.8	+1.4
Turnout		3,082	33.6	−5.0
Liberal Democrats hold		Swing	+0.7	

Packwood
Party	Candidate	Votes	%	±%
Conservative	Ian Courts	2,522	62.4	+1.7
Liberal Democrats	Christine Reeves	1,226	30.4	−2.4
Labour	Kenneth Nye	291	7.2	+0.7
Majority		1,296	32.1	+4.1
Turnout		4,039	34.6	−3.3
Conservative gain from Liberal Democrats		Swing	+2.0	

Shirley East
Party	Candidate	Votes	%	±%
Liberal Democrats	John Reeve	1,567	49.8	−7.3
Conservative	Patricia Handslip	1,307	41.5	+6.5
Labour	Kevin Raven	273	8.7	+0.8
Majority		260	8.3	−13.8
Turnout		3,147	34.4	−4.7
Liberal Democrats hold		Swing	-6.9	

Shirley South
Party	Candidate	Votes	%	±%
Conservative	Fiona Oakes	1,897	53.3	−1.0
Liberal Democrats	Roger Gemmell	1,151	32.3	+4.6
Labour	James Burman	512	14.4	−3.7
Majority		746	21.0	−5.6
Turnout		3,560	27.5	−1.2
Conservative hold		Swing	-2.8	

Shirley West
Party	Candidate	Votes	%	±%
Liberal Democrats	Susan Reeve	1,492	56.3	+35.2
Conservative	David Skelding	843	31.8	−22.3
Labour	Arthur Harper	317	12.0	−12.8
Majority		649	24.5	−4.8
Turnout		2,652	29.5	−0.9
Liberal Democrats gain from Conservative		Swing	+28.7	

Silhill
Party	Candidate	Votes	%	±%
Conservative	Susan Gomm	1,849	61.4	−0.3
Liberal Democrats	Barbara Harber	794	26.4	+2.9
Labour	Una Kimberley	370	12.3	−2.5
Majority		1,055	35.0	−3.1
Turnout		3,013	30.7	−4.6
Conservative hold		Swing	-1.6	

Smith's Wood
Party	Candidate	Votes	%	±%
Labour	Donald Cornock	716	59.9	−5.2
Conservative	Daniel Kettle	307	25.7	+3.9
Liberal Democrats	Brenda Davies	173	14.5	+1.4
Majority		409	34.2	−9.1
Turnout		1,196	16.5	−1.9
Labour hold		Swing	-4.5	

St Alphege
Party	Candidate	Votes	%	±%
Conservative	Stuart Davis	2,516	66.7	+0.6
Liberal Democrats	Brenda Chapple	950	25.2	+1.0
Labour	Marcus Bennion	306	8.1	−1.6
Majority		1,566	41.5	−0.4
Turnout		3,772	34.1	−3.0
Conservative hold		Swing	-0.2	
