= 2011 Solihull Metropolitan Borough Council election =

2011 UK local government election

(2010 ←) 2011 United Kingdom local elections (→ 2012)

Map of the results of the 2011 Solihull election. Conservatives in blue, Liberal Democrats in yellow, Labour in red and Greens in Green

The 2011 Solihull Metropolitan Borough Council election took place on 5 May 2011 to elect members of Solihull Metropolitan Borough Council in the West Midlands, England. Since the last election, the Liberal Democrats had defended a seat in a by-election in Olton, but had lost all three councillors for Shirley West, with Brynn Tudor being disqualified for non-attendance and the other two defecting: firstly with Howard Allen going Independent and then Simon Slater joining the Labour grouping. One third of the council was up for election and the Conservative Party gained overall control of the council from no overall control. Voter turnout naturally fell from the previous year's high turnout (caused by the 2010 general election being held alongside them), although to an above-average figure of 41.5%

== Election result ==
Solihull Metropolitan Borough Council Election, 2011
Party	Seats	Gains	Losses	Net gain/loss	Seats %	Votes %	Votes	+/−
Conservative	11	6	0	+6	64.7	48.4	32,102	+6.8%
Liberal Democrats	3	0	5	-5	17.6	19.6	12,980	-11.3%
Green	2	2	0	+2	11.8	7.5	4,972	+3.3%
Labour	1	0	2	-2	5.9	16.7	11,076	+3.6%
Residents Association	0	0	0	0	0.0	5.6	3,728	+1.6%
English Democrat	0	0	0	0	0.0	1.1	746	+1.1%
UKIP	0	0	0	0	0.0	0.7	447	+0.7%
BNP	0	0	0	0	0.0	0.5	305	-5.7%

This result had the following consequences for the total number of seats on the council after the elections :

Party	Previous council	New council
Conservatives	23	29
Liberal Democrat	17	12
Labour	8	6
Green	1	3
Independent	2	1
Total	51	51
Working majority	-5	7

== Ward results ==
Bickenhill
Party	Candidate	Votes	%	±%
Conservative	Bob Sleigh	2,076	60.4	+11.5
Labour	Angela Marian Reid	732	21.3	+1.2
Liberal Democrats	Peter Charles Lee	184	5.3	−11.3
Green	Alexander Hawkeswood	176	5.1	+2.3
BNP	Patricia Agnes Allington	161	4.7	−3.7
Residents Association	Michelle Louise Wright	110	3.2	0.0
Majority		1,344	39.1	+10.3
Turnout		3,439	36.4	−26.1
Conservative hold		Swing	+5.1	

Blythe
Party	Candidate	Votes	%	±%
Conservative	Ken Hawkins	2,358	55.2	+8.9
Residents Association	Linda Rosemary Brown	845	19.8	+13.8
Labour	Margaret Elizabeth Brittin	512	12.0	+2.4
Liberal Democrats	Tony Dupont	452	10.6	−21.9
Green	Moustafa Osman	102	2.4	+1.1
Majority		1,513	35.4	+21.6
Turnout		4,269	41.4	−28.7
Conservative gain from Liberal Democrats		Swing	-2.4	

Castle Bromwich
Party	Candidate	Votes	%	±%
Conservative	Gail Sleigh	2,328	64.1	+16.6
Labour	Hugh Robert Hendry	867	23.9	+2.6
Green	Gary Macnaughton	277	7.6	+5.8
Residents Association	Charlotte Louise McNamee	159	4.4	+2.7
Majority		1,461	40.2	+14.0
Turnout		3,631	39.6	−27.2
Conservative gain from Independent		Swing	+7.0	

Chelmsley Wood
Party	Candidate	Votes	%	±%
Green	Karl Macnaughton	1,349	51.3	+25.9
Labour Co-op	Michael Peter Corser	818	31.1	+5.2
Conservative	Catherine Price	360	13.7	−6.7
Residents Association	Laura Jane Gould	103	3.9	+2.8
Majority		531	20.2	+19.7
Turnout		2,630	28.6	−19.8
Green gain from Labour		Swing	+10.3	

Dorridge and Hockley Heath
Party	Candidate	Votes	%	±%
Conservative	Andy MacKiewicz	3,094	68.9	+10.2
Liberal Democrats	Bernard Robert Wright	544	12.1	−9.4
Labour	Raj Singh	350	7.8	−0.7
Green	Sara Irene Stevens	210	4.7	+2.1
English Democrat	Andrew Martin Taylor	177	3.9	+3.9
Residents Association	Joshua O'Nyons	120	2.7	−4.0
Majority		2,550	56.8	+19.7
Turnout		4,495		
Conservative hold		Swing		

Elmdon
Party	Candidate	Votes	%	±%
Liberal Democrats	Jean Hamilton	1,648	41.3	0.0
Conservative	Paul Thomas	1,299	32.6	−6.8
Labour	Andrew Mullinex	580	14.5	+4.5
UKIP	David John Faulkner	221	5.5	+5.5
English Democrat	Robert Graham Lassen	118	3.0	+3.0
Green	Elaine Teresa Williams	77	1.9	+0.7
Residents Association	Kay Howles	46	1.1	−0.9
Majority		349	8.7	+6.8
Turnout		3,989	42.4	−28.4
Liberal Democrats hold		Swing	+3.4	

Kingshurst and Fordbridge
Party	Candidate	Votes	%	±%
Labour	Alan Nash	1,250	50.8	+19.2
Conservative	Robert Hall	899	36.5	+7.5
Green	Scott William Rhodes	130	5.3	+0.5
Residents Association	Margaret Inglis	101	4.1	+0.3
Liberal Democrats	David Robert Godfrey	81	3.3	−12.3
Majority		351	14.3	+11.7
Turnout		2,461	26.3	−20.5
Labour hold		Swing	+5.8	

Knowle
Party	Candidate	Votes	%	±%
Conservative	Alan Rebiero	2,931	68.9	+10.8
Labour	Rachel Boyett	435	10.2	+3.1
Liberal Democrats	Anthony Ralph Ludlow	317	7.4	−14.0
Green	Jane Allison Holt	297	7.0	+2.4
English Democrat	Frank O'Brien	193	4.5	+4.5
Residents Association	Wayne Earl Wright	80	1.9	−3.3
Majority		2,496	58.7	+22.0
Turnout		4,253	50.9	−25.1
Conservative hold		Swing	+3.8	

Lyndon
Party	Candidate	Votes	%	±%
Liberal Democrats	Ken Rushen	1,605	40.7	−11.0
Conservative	Brian Holmes	1,041	26.4	−0.1
Labour	Sean Thomas Madden	760	19.3	+7.6
English Democrat	David Reynolds	258	6.5	+6.5
UKIP	Ray Mabbott	131	3.3	+3.3
Green	Frances Grice	131	3.3	+1.3
Residents Association	Rebecca Jade Hardy	14	0.4	+0.4
Majority		564	14.3	−10.9
Turnout		3,940	39.3	−29.0
Liberal Democrats hold		Swing	-5.4	

Meriden
Party	Candidate	Votes	%	±%
Conservative	David Bell	2,959	65.3	+9.4
Labour	Cathy Connan	734	16.2	+2.7
Liberal Democrats	Jennifer Wright	332	7.3	−12.5
Residents Association	Patrick Nash	292	6.4	+1.1
Green	Roger Philip King	213	4.7	+2.6
Majority		2,225	49.1	+13.0
Turnout		4,530	47.9	−25.3
Conservative hold		Swing	+3.3	

Olton
Party	Candidate	Votes	%	±%
Liberal Democrats	Norman Davies	1,970	43.8	−6.9
Conservative	David Price	1,781	39.6	+5.9
Labour	Alan Edward Jacques	474	10.5	+3.0
Green	Carol Linfield	159	3.5	+1.2
Residents Association	Hayley Watts	111	2.5	+1.1
Majority		189	4.2	−12.8
Turnout		4,495	46.0	−25.0
Liberal Democrats hold		Swing	-6.4	

Shirley East
Party	Candidate	Votes	%	±%
Conservative	Mark Parker	1,788	44.2	+8.3
Liberal Democrats	John Graham Reeve	1,126	27.8	−10.9
Residents Association	Neill John Watts	499	12.3	+2.7
Labour	Kevin Peter Raven	497	12.3	+3.1
Green	Joy Aldworth	136	3.4	+1.3
Majority		662	16.4	+13.5
Turnout		4,046	45.8	−26.4
Conservative gain from Liberal Democrats		Swing	+9.6	

Shirley South
Party	Candidate	Votes	%	±%
Conservative	Peter Doyle	1,686	38.8	+5.9
Liberal Democrats	Tim Hodgson	1,494	34.4	−8.4
Labour	Shirley Rose Young	523	12.0	+3.9
Residents Association	Trevor Eames	491	11.3	+2.7
Green	Joel Douglas Butler	149	3.4	+1.7
Majority		192	4.4	−5.5
Turnout		4,343	43.7	−26.6
Conservative gain from Liberal Democrats		Swing	+7.1	

Shirley West
Party	Candidate	Votes	%	±%
Conservative	Hannah Tildesley	1,318	35.0	+4.3
Liberal Democrats	Eimear Mary Fossey	1,167	31.0	−13.1
Labour	Ian Christopher McDonald	714	19.0	+7.9
Residents Association	Karen Socci	384	10.2	+5.3
Green	Trevor John Barker	180	4.8	+2.3
Majority		151	4.0	−9.4
Turnout		3,763	40.7	−29.4
Conservative gain from Liberal Democrats		Swing	+8.7	

Silhill
Party	Candidate	Votes	%	±%
Conservative	Robert Hulland	2,383	53.0	+6.7
Liberal Democrats	Elizabeth Adams	1,189	26.5	−10.2
Labour	Janet Marsh	524	11.7	+2.6
BNP	Alan William Ashmore	144	3.2	−1.7
Green	Roderick William Palmer	109	2.4	+0.7
UKIP	John Paul Ison	95	2.1	+2.1
Residents Association	Hilary Twinberrow	50	1.1	−0.2
Majority		1,194	26.6	+16.9
Turnout		4,494	48.2	−23.5
Conservative gain from Liberal Democrats		Swing	+8.4	

Smith's Wood
Party	Candidate	Votes	%	±%
Green	Alison Walters	1,066	45.9	+21.7
Labour	Graham Andrew Craig	770	33.2	+0.7
Conservative	David Skelding	292	12.6	−6.9
Residents Association	Ken Meeson	169	7.3	+5.9
Liberal Democrats	Saiyid Mamdooh Jalil	24	1.0	−8.4
Majority		296	12.7	+4.5
Turnout		2,321	26.1	−21.9
Green gain from Labour		Swing	+10.5	

St. Alphege
Party	Candidate	Votes	%	±%
Conservative	Joe Tildesley	3,509	66.7	+9.1
Liberal Democrats	Richard Brookes	847	16.1	−14.1
Labour	Paul Cook Tuxworth	536	10.2	+3.9
Green	Stephen Robert Holt	211	4.0	+1.2
Residents Association	John Rogers	154	2.9	−0.1
Majority		2,662	50.6	+23.2
Turnout		5,257	50.3	−26.0
Conservative hold		Swing	+11.6	
