= 2007 Solihull Metropolitan Borough Council election =

2007 UK local government election

(2006 ←) 2007 United Kingdom local elections (→ 2008)

Map of the results of the 2007 Solihull election. Conservatives in blue, Liberal Democrats in yellow and the Labour in red.

The 2007 Solihull Metropolitan Borough Council election took place on 4 May 2007 to elect members of Solihull Metropolitan Borough Council in the West Midlands, England. One third of the council was up for election and the Conservative Party lost overall control of the council to no overall control.

== Campaign ==
Before the election there were 25 Conservative, 15 Liberal Democrat, 7 Labour, 1 British National Party and 2 independent councillors. 1 seat was vacant after Conservative councillor of Knowle ward, Les Kyles, died in January 2007. Five councillors stood down at the election, Liberal Democrats Olive Hogg, Barbara Harber and Susan Reeve and Conservatives Theresa Tedd and David Elsmore. In total 72 candidates stood in the election for 17 seats, including candidates from the 3 leading parties and 5 candidates from the British National Party, after the British National Party won a seat at the 2006 election for the first time. The Green Party stood in all 17 wards and there were 3 candidates from the United Kingdom Independence Party and 2 independents.

The Conservatives pledged to build on their record on recycling which had gone up 26% from 7% over 3 years. They also were confident of their record on education and wanted to get a fairer financial settlement from the national government. The Liberal Democrats said improving transport links in Solihull was a priority, along with better services for the elderly and improving recycling. Meanwhile, Labour wanted to ensure the regeneration programme for the north of Solihull worked and to deliver cost effective services. All 3 parties pledged to address anti-social behaviour as a priority.

Before the campaign began, as in 2006, the leaders of the Conservative, Liberal Democrat and Labour parties on the council signed a charter to promote good race relations.

== Election results ==
The results saw the Conservative Party lose 2 seats to the Liberal Democrats, meaning that no party had a majority on the council, but the Conservatives remained the largest party with 24 seats. The Liberal Democrats gained Shirley South and Silhill wards from the Conservatives to hold 17 seats, with the winner in Silhill, Tim Hodgson, becoming the youngest councillor in Solihull at the age of 21. Labour held onto the seats they were defending, including Chelmsley Wood where they defeated the British National Party by 192 votes in a ward the British National Party had won in 2006. This meant Labour remained on 7 seats, compared to 1 for the British National Party and 2 independents. Overall turnout was 36.5%, down from 38.4% in 2006.

Following the election the leader of the council for the past 8 years, Ted Richards, resigned as leader of the council and Conservative group, after what he described as "disappointing" election results. However the Conservatives continued to run the council as a minority administration.

Solihull local election result 2007
| Party | Seats | Gains | Losses | Net gain/loss | Seats % | Votes % | Votes | +/− |
|---|---|---|---|---|---|---|---|---|
| Liberal Democrats | 8 | 2 | 0 | +2 | 47.1 | 33.6 | 19,494 | -0.5 |
| Conservative | 6 | 0 | 2 | -2 | 35.3 | 45.3 | 26,266 | -1.0 |
| Labour | 3 | 0 | 0 | 0 | 17.6 | 9.8 | 5,688 | -1.2 |
| Green | 0 | 0 | 0 | 0 | 0.0 | 5.1 | 2,976 | +2.2 |
| BNP | 0 | 0 | 0 | 0 | 0.0 | 4.3 | 2,473 | +0.6 |
| UKIP | 0 | 0 | 0 | 0 | 0.0 | 1.1 | 638 | +1.1 |
| Independent | 0 | 0 | 0 | 0 | 0.0 | 0.8 | 473 | -1.2 |

This result had the following consequences for the total number of seats on the council after the elections :

| Party | Previous council | New council |
|---|---|---|
| Conservatives | 26 | 24 |
| Liberal Democrat | 15 | 17 |
| Labour | 7 | 7 |
| Independent | 2 | 2 |
| BNP | 1 | 1 |
| Total | 51 | 51 |
| Working majority | 1 | -3 |

== Ward results ==
Bickenhill
| Party | Candidate | Votes | % | ±% |
|---|---|---|---|---|
| Conservative | Bob Sleigh | 1,967 | 65.7 | +1.2 |
| Labour | Ian McDonald | 479 | 16.0 | −3.3 |
| Liberal Democrats | Steve Green | 306 | 10.2 | −5.0 |
| Green | Alexander Hawkeswood | 242 | 8.1 | +8.1 |
| Majority | | 1,488 | 49.7 | +4.5 |
| Turnout | | 2,994 | 33.8 | −0.3 |
| Conservative hold | | Swing | +2.2 | |

Blythe
| Party | Candidate | Votes | % | ±% |
|---|---|---|---|---|
| Liberal Democrats | Len Cresswell | 1,832 | 50.1 | +7.9 |
| Conservative | Martin McCarthy | 1,522 | 41.7 | −4.8 |
| Labour | Margaret Brittin | 158 | 4.3 | −0.8 |
| Green | Pauline Smith | 142 | 3.9 | −2.4 |
| Majority | | 310 | 8.5 | +4.2 |
| Turnout | | 3,654 | 38.9 | +0.1 |
| Liberal Democrats hold | | Swing | +6.3 | |

Castle Bromwich
| Party | Candidate | Votes | % | ±% |
|---|---|---|---|---|
| Conservative | Ian Hillas | 2,000 | 63.2 | −4.9 |
| Liberal Democrats | Andrew Bull | 908 | 28.7 | +8.2 |
| Green | Kirsten Henly | 259 | 8.2 | +8.2 |
| Majority | | 1,092 | 34.5 | −13.2 |
| Turnout | | 3,167 | 35.3 | −1.9 |
| Conservative hold | | Swing | -6.5 | |

Chelmsley Wood
| Party | Candidate | Votes | % | ±% |
|---|---|---|---|---|
| Labour | Mick Corser | 913 | 38.9 | +6.8 |
| BNP | Andrew Terry | 721 | 30.7 | −2.3 |
| Conservative | Sheila Courts | 410 | 17.4 | −3.7 |
| Liberal Democrats | Bernard Wright | 174 | 7.4 | −6.4 |
| Green | Ronnie Cashmore | 132 | 5.6 | +5.6 |
| Majority | | 192 | 8.2 | +7.3 |
| Turnout | | 2,350 | 27.4 | +1.2 |
| Labour hold | | Swing | +4.5 | |

Dorridge and Hockley Heath
| Party | Candidate | Votes | % | ±% |
|---|---|---|---|---|
| Conservative | Andy Mackiewicz | 2,629 | 70.6 | +6.8 |
| Liberal Democrats | Brenda Davies | 587 | 15.8 | −8.1 |
| Green | Pam Archer | 345 | 9.3 | +1.7 |
| Labour | Irma Shaw | 165 | 4.4 | −0.2 |
| Majority | | 2,042 | 54.8 | +14.9 |
| Turnout | | 3,726 | 44.3 | −1.1 |
| Conservative hold | | Swing | +7.4 | |

Elmdon
| Party | Candidate | Votes | % | ±% |
|---|---|---|---|---|
| Liberal Democrats | Jean Hamilton | 1,960 | 48.3 | +6.2 |
| Conservative | Shay Parekh | 1,375 | 33.9 | −15.4 |
| BNP | Neil Munnerley | 331 | 8.2 | +8.2 |
| Labour | Lorraine Essex | 290 | 7.1 | −1.5 |
| Green | Elaine Williams | 105 | 2.6 | +2.6 |
| Majority | | 585 | 14.4 | +7.3 |
| Turnout | | 4,061 | 43.5 | +0.0 |
| Liberal Democrats hold | | Swing | +10.8 | |

Kingshurst and Fordbridge
| Party | Candidate | Votes | % | ±% |
|---|---|---|---|---|
| Labour | Frederick Nash | 732 | 32.3 | −5.3 |
| Conservative | Pauline Hislop | 675 | 29.8 | −9.6 |
| BNP | Graham Pringle | 654 | 28.8 | +28.8 |
| Liberal Democrats | Jennifer Wright | 132 | 5.8 | −17.2 |
| Green | Clair Garbett | 75 | 3.3 | +3.3 |
| Majority | | 57 | 2.5 | +0.7 |
| Turnout | | 2,268 | 25.2 | +0.3 |
| Labour hold | | Swing | +2.1 | |

Knowle
| Party | Candidate | Votes | % | ±% |
|---|---|---|---|---|
| Conservative | Alan Rebeiro | 2,487 | 69.5 | +11.2 |
| Liberal Democrats | Geoffrey Berry | 688 | 19.2 | −13.0 |
| Green | Jane Holt | 280 | 7.8 | +1.8 |
| Labour | Catherine Connan | 122 | 3.4 | −0.2 |
| Majority | | 1,799 | 50.3 | +24.2 |
| Turnout | | 3,577 | 44.1 | −3.3 |
| Conservative hold | | Swing | +12.1 | |

Lyndon
| Party | Candidate | Votes | % | ±% |
|---|---|---|---|---|
| Liberal Democrats | Ken Rushen | 1,889 | 53.2 | −6.1 |
| Conservative | Greg Goldingay | 949 | 26.7 | +5.3 |
| Labour | Raj Singh | 262 | 7.4 | −3.1 |
| UKIP | Raymond Mabbott | 236 | 6.7 | +6.7 |
| Green | Frances Grice | 212 | 6.0 | −2.8 |
| Majority | | 940 | 26.5 | −11.3 |
| Turnout | | 3,548 | 36.2 | +0.1 |
| Liberal Democrats hold | | Swing | -5.7 | |

Meriden
| Party | Candidate | Votes | % | ±% |
|---|---|---|---|---|
| Conservative | David Bell | 2,472 | 70.4 | +2.6 |
| Liberal Democrats | Alan Berry | 437 | 12.5 | −7.3 |
| Labour | Jonathan Maltman | 389 | 11.1 | −1.3 |
| Green | Roger King | 212 | 6.0 | +6.0 |
| Majority | | 2,035 | 58.0 | +10.1 |
| Turnout | | 3,510 | 38.6 | −0.6 |
| Conservative hold | | Swing | +4.9 | |

Olton
| Party | Candidate | Votes | % | ±% |
|---|---|---|---|---|
| Liberal Democrats | Norman Davies | 2,346 | 60.2 | +8.0 |
| Conservative | Richard Williams | 1,206 | 31.0 | −5.6 |
| Labour | Alan Jacques | 181 | 4.6 | −0.6 |
| Green | Nilesh Chauhan | 161 | 4.1 | −1.9 |
| Majority | | 1,140 | 29.3 | +13.7 |
| Turnout | | 3,894 | 41.3 | −1.9 |
| Liberal Democrats hold | | Swing | +6.8 | |

Shirley East
| Party | Candidate | Votes | % | ±% |
|---|---|---|---|---|
| Liberal Democrats | John Reeve | 1,588 | 46.8 | +8.0 |
| Conservative | Sally Bell | 1,086 | 32.0 | +1.0 |
| Independent | Neil Watts | 403 | 11.9 | −12.5 |
| Labour | Kevin Raven | 200 | 5.9 | +0.2 |
| Green | Sara Stevens | 118 | 3.5 | +3.5 |
| Majority | | 502 | 14.8 | +7.0 |
| Turnout | | 3,395 | 40.3 | −2.7 |
| Liberal Democrats hold | | Swing | +3.5 | |

Shirley South
| Party | Candidate | Votes | % | ±% |
|---|---|---|---|---|
| Liberal Democrats | Tim Hodgson | 1,926 | 47.1 | +8.9 |
| Conservative | Peter Groom | 1,364 | 33.3 | +2.3 |
| BNP | Charles Shipman | 376 | 9.2 | −7.2 |
| Labour | Shirley Young | 212 | 5.2 | −2.0 |
| UKIP | Lydia Simpson | 72 | 1.8 | +1.8 |
| Green | Claire Henly | 71 | 1.7 | +1.7 |
| Independent | Rosemary Worsley | 70 | 1.7 | −5.5 |
| Majority | | 562 | 13.7 | +6.5 |
| Turnout | | 4,091 | 43.3 | +0.8 |
| Liberal Democrats gain from Conservative | | Swing | +3.3 | |

Shirley West
| Party | Candidate | Votes | % | ±% |
|---|---|---|---|---|
| Liberal Democrats | Brynn Tudor | 1,679 | 50.0 | +7.9 |
| Conservative | Mark Parker | 979 | 29.2 | +5.0 |
| UKIP | Nikki Sinclaire | 330 | 9.8 | +9.8 |
| Labour | Arthur Harper | 212 | 6.3 | −0.5 |
| Green | Trevor Barker | 157 | 4.7 | −1.1 |
| Majority | | 700 | 20.9 | +3.0 |
| Turnout | | 3,357 | 37.2 | −3.8 |
| Liberal Democrats hold | | Swing | +1.4 | |

Silhill
| Party | Candidate | Votes | % | ±% |
|---|---|---|---|---|
| Liberal Democrats | Leela Widger | 1,828 | 43.4 | +10.3 |
| Conservative | Peter Hogarth | 1,713 | 40.7 | −17.1 |
| BNP | Alan Ashmore | 391 | 9.3 | +9.3 |
| Labour | Janet Marsh | 223 | 5.3 | −3.8 |
| Green | Olga Farooqui | 56 | 1.3 | +1.3 |
| Majority | | 115 | 2.7 | +22.0 |
| Turnout | | 4,211 | 47.7 | +6.0 |
| Liberal Democrats gain from Conservative | | Swing | +13.7 | |

Smith's Wood
| Party | Candidate | Votes | % | ±% |
|---|---|---|---|---|
| Labour | Graham Craig | 924 | 48.0 | +1.2 |
| Conservative | Jim Williams | 613 | 31.9 | −2.6 |
| Liberal Democrats | Tony Ludlow | 220 | 11.4 | −7.3 |
| Green | Michael Sheridan | 166 | 8.6 | +8.6 |
| Majority | | 311 | 16.2 | +4.0 |
| Turnout | | 1,923 | 21.9 | +0.0 |
| Labour hold | | Swing | +1.9 | |

St. Alphege
| Party | Candidate | Votes | % | ±% |
|---|---|---|---|---|
| Conservative | Joe Tildesley | 2,819 | 65.8 | +10.4 |
| Liberal Democrats | Mamdooh Jalil | 994 | 23.2 | −13.3 |
| Green | James Hepton | 243 | 5.7 | +1.8 |
| Labour | Paul Tuxworth | 226 | 5.3 | +1.2 |
| Majority | | 1,825 | 42.6 | +23.7 |
| Turnout | | 4,282 | 43.1 | −2.4 |
| Conservative hold | | Swing | +11.8 | |
