= 2004 Solihull Metropolitan Borough Council election =

2004 UK local government election

(2003 ←) 2004 United Kingdom local elections (→ 2006)

Map of the results of the 2004 Solihull Council election. Conservatives in blue, Labour in red, Liberal Democrats in yellow and Independent in grey.

The 2004 Solihull Metropolitan Borough Council election took place on 10 June 2004 to elect members of Solihull Metropolitan Borough Council in the West Midlands, England. The whole council was up for election with boundary changes since the last election in 2003. The Conservative Party stayed in overall control of the council.

== Campaign ==
During the lead up to the election, the Labour Party suffered 2 defections. Firstly, councillor Jim Ryan quit the party to sit as an independent after disagreements over policy. He was then followed in May 2004 by Jeff Potts, who defected to join the Conservatives and blamed infighting within the Labour Party for his decision. Both councillors contested the election, Jim Ryan as an independent, and Jeff Potts as a Conservative in Kingshurst and Fordbridge ward.

The election saw the British National Party (BNP) contest 2 seats in Chelmsley Wood and Olton wards, while the National Front contested Silhill ward. The presence of these candidates led the leaders of each of the Conservative, Liberal Democrat and Labour parties on the council to condemn the policies of both the BNP and National Front.

== Election results ==
The results saw the Conservatives stay in control of the council but with their majority cut from 5 to 3 seats. The Conservatives dropped by 1 seat, while the Liberal Democrats became the next largest party on the council after gaining 5 seats. Labour dropped by 5 seats, 3 of which could be put down to the boundary changes, while another seat was lost by Labour to the Conservatives in Kingshurst and Fordbridge. The final Labour loss came in Bickenhill where former Labour councillor Jim Ryan was re-elected onto the council as an independent. Overall turnout increased by 10% from 2003 to reach 39%.

Solihull local election result 2004
Party	Seats	Gains	Losses	Net gain/loss	Seats %	Votes %	Votes	+/−
Conservative	27	0	0	0	52.9	46.3	30,098	-12.6
Liberal Democrats	15	0	0	0	29.4	32.7	21,232	+10.1
Labour	8	0	0	0	15.7	15.6	10,116	-2.6
Independent	1	0	0	0	2.0	3.6	2,346	+3.6
BNP	0	0	0	0	0.0	1.4	935	+1.4
National Front	0	0	0	0	0.0	0.4	287	+0.4

This result had the following consequences for the total number of seats on the council after the elections :

Party	Previous council	New council
Conservatives	28	27
Liberal Democrat	10	15
Labour	13	8
Independent	0	1
Total	51	51
Working majority	5	3

== Ward results ==
Bickenhill
Party	Candidate	Votes	%	±%
Independent	Jim Ryan	2,346	48.5	N/A
Conservative	Robert Sleigh	1,510	31.2	N/A
Conservative	Alan Martin	1,472		
Conservative	James Williams	1,079		
Labour	Arthur Harper	554	11.4	N/A
Labour	Ann Wood	464		
Liberal Democrats	Jennifer Wright	430	8.9	N/A
Liberal Democrats	Jean Hamilton	413		
Majority		836	17.3	N/A
Turnout		4,840	40.4	N/A
Independent win (new seat)				
Conservative win (new seat)				
Conservative win (new seat)				

Blythe
Party	Candidate	Votes	%	±%
Liberal Democrats	Margaret Allen	1,720	46.5	N/A
Liberal Democrats	Leonard Cresswell	1,664		
Conservative	Brian Burgess	1,605	43.4	N/A
Conservative	David Skelding	1,589		
Liberal Democrats	Charles Robinson	1,555		
Conservative	Rosemary Worsley	1,553		
Labour	Shirley Young	376	10.2	N/A
Majority		115	3.1	N/A
Turnout		3,701	40.5	N/A
Liberal Democrats win (new seat)				
Liberal Democrats win (new seat)				
Conservative win (new seat)				

Castle Bromwich
Party	Candidate	Votes	%	±%
Conservative	George Richards	2,603	64.5	N/A
Conservative	Ian Hillas	2,133		
Conservative	Michael Robinson	2,074		
Labour	Kenneth Nye	796	19.7	N/A
Liberal Democrats	Geoffrey Daniell	639	15.8	N/A
Labour	Patricia Harrop	636		
Majority		1,807	44.7	N/A
Turnout		4,038	38.3	N/A
Conservative win (new seat)				
Conservative win (new seat)				
Conservative win (new seat)				

Chelmsley Wood
Party	Candidate	Votes	%	±%
Labour	Alfred Hill	1,051	40.1	N/A
Labour	Michael Corser	871		
Labour	Nicholas Stephens	778		
BNP	George Morgan	679	25.9	N/A
Conservative	Gail Sleigh	510	19.5	N/A
Conservative	Martin McCarthy	487		
Conservative	Graham Juniper	484		
Liberal Democrats	John Scriven	380	14.5	N/A
Majority		372	14.2	N/A
Turnout		2,620	25.5	N/A
Labour win (new seat)				
Labour win (new seat)				
Labour win (new seat)				

Dorridge and Hockley Heath
Party	Candidate	Votes	%	±%
Conservative	Kenneth Meeson	2,889	59.2	N/A
Conservative	Andrzej Mackiewicz	2,710		
Conservative	Ian Courts	2,533		
Liberal Democrats	Claire Berry	1,398	28.6	N/A
Labour	Janet Fletcher	595	12.2	N/A
Majority		1,491	30.5	N/A
Turnout		4,882	47.6	N/A
Conservative win (new seat)				
Conservative win (new seat)				
Conservative win (new seat)				

Elmdon
Party	Candidate	Votes	%	±%
Conservative	John Bramham	1,832	44.8	N/A
Liberal Democrats	Barbara Harber	1,651	40.3	N/A
Conservative	Kenneth Hawkins	1,642		
Conservative	James Wild	1,612		
Liberal Democrats	Nigel Dyer	1,553		
Liberal Democrats	Christine Reeves	1,519		
Labour	Frederick Churchill	609	14.9	N/A
Majority		181	4.4	N/A
Turnout		4,092	41.5	N/A
Conservative win (new seat)				
Liberal Democrats win (new seat)				
Conservative win (new seat)				

Kingshurst and Fordbridge
Party	Candidate	Votes	%	±%
Labour	John Kimberley	872	40.2	N/A
Labour	Frederick Nash	840		
Conservative	Robert Hall	831	38.3	N/A
Labour	Kenneth Harrop	811		
Conservative	Jeffrey Potts	775		
Conservative	Elspeth Martin	757		
Liberal Democrats	Christopher Hayes	468	21.5	N/A
Majority		41	1.9	N/A
Turnout		2,169	24.2	N/A
Labour win (new seat)				
Labour win (new seat)				
Conservative win (new seat)				

Knowle
Party	Candidate	Votes	%	±%
Conservative	James Blake	2,617	61.6	N/A
Conservative	Leslie Kyles	2,384		
Conservative	Diana Holl-Allen	2,370		
Liberal Democrats	Anthony Verduyn	1,050	24.7	N/A
Labour	Alan Jacques	581	13.7	N/A
Majority		1,567	36.9	N/A
Turnout		4,248	44.8	N/A
Conservative win (new seat)				
Conservative win (new seat)				
Conservative win (new seat)				

Lyndon
Party	Candidate	Votes	%	±%
Liberal Democrats	Irene Chamberlain	2,319	58.4	N/A
Liberal Democrats	Olive Hogg	2,100		
Liberal Democrats	Robert Reeves	1,983		
Conservative	Theresa Tedd	1,143	28.8	N/A
Conservative	David Williams	1,106		
Conservative	Shailesh Parekh	980		
Labour	Catherine Connan	506	12.7	N/A
Majority		1,176	29.6	N/A
Turnout		3,968	38.1	N/A
Liberal Democrats win (new seat)				
Liberal Democrats win (new seat)				
Liberal Democrats win (new seat)				

Meriden
Party	Candidate	Votes	%	±%
Conservative	Peter Lea	2,489	62.9	N/A
Conservative	David Bell	2,182		
Conservative	Kenneth Allsopp	2,087		
Liberal Democrats	Mark Johnson	888	22.4	N/A
Liberal Democrats	Peter Whitlock	759		
Liberal Democrats	Hugh McCredie	742		
Labour	Jonathan Maltman	581	14.7	N/A
Majority		1,601	40.4	N/A
Turnout		3,958	40.9	N/A
Conservative win (new seat)				
Conservative win (new seat)				
Conservative win (new seat)				

Olton
Party	Candidate	Votes	%	±%
Liberal Democrats	Honor Cox	2,209	51.2	N/A
Liberal Democrats	Norman Davies	2,161		
Liberal Democrats	John Windmill	2,009		
Conservative	Charles Drayson	1,489	34.5	N/A
Conservative	Peter Groom	1,375		
Conservative	Dipak Shah	1,033		
Labour	Gerald Dufficy	362	8.4	N/A
BNP	Mark James	256	5.9	N/A
Majority		720	16.7	N/A
Turnout		4,316	45.1	N/A
Liberal Democrats win (new seat)				
Liberal Democrats win (new seat)				
Liberal Democrats win (new seat)				

Shirley East
Party	Candidate	Votes	%	±%
Liberal Democrats	June Gandy	2,181	53.4	N/A
Liberal Democrats	John Reeve	2,058		
Liberal Democrats	Ian Hedley	1,841		
Conservative	Neill Watts	1,540	37.7	N/A
Conservative	Patricia Handslip	1,431		
Conservative	Joseph Tidesley	1,391		
Labour	Kevin Raven	360	8.8	N/A
Majority		641	15.7	N/A
Turnout		4,081	46.2	N/A
Liberal Democrats win (new seat)				
Liberal Democrats win (new seat)				
Liberal Democrats win (new seat)				

Shirley South
Party	Candidate	Votes	%	±%
Conservative	Gary Allport	2,158	52.0	N/A
Conservative	David Elsmore	1,999		
Conservative	John Hawkswood	1,922		
Liberal Democrats	Howard Knight	1,312	31.6	N/A
Liberal Democrats	Roger Gemmell	1,253		
Liberal Democrats	Ian Lynes	1,030		
Labour	James Burman	676	16.3	N/A
Majority		846	20.4	N/A
Turnout		4,146	40.4	N/A
Conservative win (new seat)				
Conservative win (new seat)				
Conservative win (new seat)				

Shirley West
Party	Candidate	Votes	%	±%
Liberal Democrats	Howard Allen	1,802	52.6	N/A
Liberal Democrats	Susan Reeve	1,753		
Liberal Democrats	Elsie Cotton	1,741		
Conservative	James Pike	1,315	38.4	N/A
Conservative	Lee Watts	1,152		
Conservative	Jeffrey Stocks	1,119		
Labour	Rajeshwar Singh	308	9.0	N/A
Majority		487	14.2	N/A
Turnout		3,425	38.2	N/A
Liberal Democrats win (new seat)				
Liberal Democrats win (new seat)				
Liberal Democrats win (new seat)				

Silhill
Party	Candidate	Votes	%	±%
Conservative	Susan Gomm	2,005	51.4	N/A
Conservative	Peter Hogarth	1,944		
Conservative	Sheila Pittaway	1,846		
Liberal Democrats	Brenda Davies	1,158	29.7	N/A
Liberal Democrats	John Knight	1,042		
Liberal Democrats	Douglas Hogg	976		
Labour	Una Kimberley	453	11.6	N/A
National Front	Norman Tomkinson	287	7.3	N/A
Majority		847	21.7	N/A
Turnout		3,903	43.2	N/A
Conservative win (new seat)				
Conservative win (new seat)				
Conservative win (new seat)				

Smith's Wood
Party	Candidate	Votes	%	±%
Labour	Hugh Hendry	1,014	47.1	N/A
Labour	Graham Craig	1,004		
Labour	Donald Cornock	994		
Conservative	Daniel Kettle	713	33.1	N/A
Conservative	Robert Jolley	544		
Conservative	Clive Nelson	537		
Liberal Democrats	Bernard Wright	427	19.8	N/A
Majority		301	14.0	N/A
Turnout		2,154	23.5	N/A
Labour win (new seat)				
Labour win (new seat)				
Labour win (new seat)				

St Alphege
Party	Candidate	Votes	%	±%
Conservative	Kathleen Wild	2,849	63.7	N/A
Conservative	Jean Clark	2,799		
Conservative	Stuart Davis	2,664		
Liberal Democrats	Brenda Chapple	1,202	26.9	N/A
Liberal Democrats	David Small	1,023		
Liberal Democrats	Andrew Hodgson	980		
Labour	Michelle Cluney	422	9.4	N/A
Majority		1,647	36.8	N/A
Turnout		4,473	44.6	N/A
Conservative win (new seat)				
Conservative win (new seat)				
Conservative win (new seat)				

== By-elections between 2004 and 2006 ==
St Alphege by-election 3 March 2005
Party	Candidate	Votes	%	±%
Conservative	Theresa Tedd	1,760	49.4	−14.3
Liberal Democrats	Christine Reeves	1,673	46.9	+20.0
Labour	Janet Fletcher	133	3.7	−5.7
Majority		87	2.5	−34.3
Turnout		3,566	36.0	−8.6
Conservative hold		Swing	-17.1	

Knowle by-election 15 September 2005
Party	Candidate	Votes	%	±%
Conservative	Jefrey Potts	1,247	46.6	−15.0
Liberal Democrats	Geoffrey Berry	1,232	46.0	+21.3
Green	Christopher Williams	134	5.0	+5.0
Labour	Ian McDonald	63	2.3	−11.4
Majority		15	0.6	−36.3
Turnout		2,676	32.8	−12.0
Conservative hold		Swing	-18.1	
