= 2010 Solihull Metropolitan Borough Council election =

2010 UK local government election

(2008 ←) 2010 United Kingdom local elections (→ 2011)

Map of the results of the 2010 Solihull election. Conservatives in blue, Liberal Democrats in yellow and Labour in red.

The 2010 Solihull Metropolitan Borough Council election took place on 6 May 2010 to elect members of Solihull Metropolitan Borough Council in the West Midlands, England. One third of the council was up for election and the council stayed under no overall control.

== Campaign ==
Before the election the council was run by the Conservatives, but without an overall majority after Castle Bromwich councillor, Ian Hillas, had defected to independent in 2009. 2 sitting councillors stood down at the election, Liberal Democrat Bob Reeves from Lyndon ward and the British National Party's George Morgan from Chelmsley Wood ward. 17 seats were contested in the election with candidates from the Conservative Party, Liberal Democrats, Labour Party, Green Party and British National Party.

There was also a new party contesting 15 of the 17 seats, the Solihull and Meriden Residents' Association. This was formed by a number of independents in response to a council tax rise of 2.5% and to address what they saw as a loss of democracy in local council politics. Among the candidates for the Solihull and Meriden Residents' Association was Trevor Eames a former Independent Ratepayer councillor for 18 years, who had resigned from the council after being jailed for 7 years, but who said he wanted to serve as councillor as "recompense". The only independent candidate Neil Watts was on the ballot paper and described in the press as an independent, but was endorsed as a candidate for the Solihull and Meridan Residents Association.

The Solihull and Meriden Residents' Association wanted to have local referendums, reduce councillors pay and have local council officers deal with graffiti and flytipping. Other issues in the election included the removal of maternity services from Solihull, preserving green space and the future of Jaguar Land Rover.

== Election results ==
The results saw no party win a majority on the council after the Conservatives lost 2 seats to have 23 councillors. The Liberal Democrats had 19 seats after gaining Elmdon from the Conservatives defeating cabinet member Ken Hawkins by 128 votes. Labour gained Kingshurst and Fordbridge ward from the Conservatives by 110 votes and also took Chelmsley Wood from the British National Party finishing ahead of the Green Party candidate by just 22 votes. Chelmsley Wood had been the British National Party's only seat, while the results meant Labour held 7 seats after the election. The Solihull and Meriden Residents' Association failed to win any seats, with their most high-profile candidate Trevor Eames coming third in Shirley South.

Following the election the Liberal Democrat and Labour parties formed a coalition to run the council, with Liberal Democrat Ian Hedley being elected leader of the council with 26 of the 51 votes on 25 May.

Solihull local election result 2010
Party	Seats	Gains	Losses	Net gain/loss	Seats %	Votes %	Votes	+/−
Conservative	8	Steady	▼2	▼2	47.1	41.6	44,409	▼6.1
Liberal Democrats	6	▲1	Steady	▲1	35.3	30.9	32,997	▲3.5
Labour	3	▲2	Steady	▲2	17.6	13.1	13,953	▲5.1
BNP	0	Steady	▼1	▼1	0.0	6.2	6,618	▼2.7
Green	0	Steady	Steady	Steady	0.0	4.2	4,444	▼0.5
Residents Association	0	Steady	Steady	Steady	0.0	4.0	4,206	▲4.0

This result had the following consequences for the total number of seats on the council after the elections :

Party	Previous council	New council
Conservatives	25	23
Liberal Democrat	18	19
Labour	5	7
Green	1	1
Independent	1	1
BNP	1	0
Total	51	51
Working majority	▼1	▼5

== Ward results ==
Bickenhill
Party	Candidate	Votes	%	±%
Conservative	Alan Martin	2,887	48.9	▼17.7
Labour	Florence Nash	1,186	20.1	▲9.9
Liberal Democrats	Martin Smith	983	16.6	▲10.7
BNP	Patricia Allington	496	8.4	▼4.9
Residents Association	Michelle Wright	189	3.2	▲3.2
Green	Alexander Hawkeswood	164	2.8	▼1.2
Majority		1,701	28.8	▼24.5
Turnout		5,925	62.5	
Conservative hold		Swing	▼13.8	

Blythe
Party	Candidate	Votes	%	±%
Conservative	Brian Burgess	3,312	46.4	▼1.9
Liberal Democrats	Charles Robinson	2,322	32.5	▼13.9
Labour	Raj Singh	682	9.6	▲6.4
Residents Association	Linda Brown	426	6.0	▲6.0
BNP	George Angus	310	4.3	▲4.3
Green	Moustafa Osman	89	1.2	▼1.0
Majority		990	13.9	▲12.0
Turnout		7,162	70.1	
Conservative hold		Swing	▲6.0	

Castle Bromwich
Party	Candidate	Votes	%	±%
Conservative	Mike Robinson	2,914	47.5	▼20.2
Labour	Irma Shaw	1,304	21.3	▲12.2
Liberal Democrats	Andrew Bull	1,039	16.9	▼9.6
BNP	Eddie Stainfield	668	10.9	▼2.2
Green	Scott Rhodes	109	1.8	▼1.0
Residents Association	Joanna Hall	102	1.7	▲1.7
Majority		1,610	26.2	▼28.4
Turnout		6,154	66.8	
Conservative hold		Swing	▼16.2	

Chelmsley Wood
Party	Candidate	Votes	%	±%
Labour	Nick Stephens	1,140	25.9	▼6.5
Green	Ronnie Cashmore	1,118	25.4	▲19.9
Conservative	Gail Sleigh	897	20.4	▼9.0
BNP	Andrew Terry	650	14.8	▼11.4
Liberal Democrats	Liz Adams	542	12.3	▲5.8
Residents Association	Dawn O'Nyons	49	1.1	▲1.1
Majority		22	0.5	▼2.5
Turnout		4,415	48.4	
Labour gain from BNP		Swing	▼13.2	

Dorridge and Hockley Heath
Party	Candidate	Votes	%	±%
Conservative	Ian Courts	3,891	58.6	▼7.3
Liberal Democrats	Jo Hodgson	1,430	21.5	▲4.3
Labour	Barry Beattie	566	8.5	▲5.0
Residents Association	Andy Moore	443	6.7	▲6.7
Green	Sara Stevens	175	2.6	▼3.4
BNP	Andrew Taylor	131	2.0	▼5.4
Majority		2,461	37.1	▼11.7
Turnout		6,654	76.6	
Conservative hold		Swing	▼5.8	

Elmdon
Party	Candidate	Votes	%	±%
Liberal Democrats	Martin Hewings	2,721	41.3	▲0.9
Conservative	Ken Hawkins	2,593	39.4	▲4.6
Labour	Hugh Hendry	658	10.0	▲4.7
BNP	Tony Greenshields	402	6.1	▼9.1
Residents Association	Kay Howles	134	2.0	▲2.0
Green	Elaine Williams	79	1.2	▼0.5
Majority		128	1.9	▼3.7
Turnout		6,614	70.8	
Liberal Democrats gain from Conservative		Swing	▼1.8	

Kingshurst and Fordbridge
Party	Candidate	Votes	%	±%
Labour	David Jamieson	1,385	31.6	▲1.5
Conservative	Rob Hall	1,275	29.1	▼8.1
Liberal Democrats	Angi Wright	684	15.6	▲9.4
BNP	George Rouse	667	15.2	▼7.9
Green	John Kimberley	210	4.8	▲1.5
Residents Association	Margaret Inglis	165	3.8	▲3.8
Majority		110	2.5	▼4.6
Turnout		4,416	46.8	
Labour gain from Conservative		Swing	▲4.8	

Knowle
Party	Candidate	Votes	%	±%
Conservative	Diana Holl-Allen	3,660	58.2	▼5.2
Liberal Democrats	Tony Dupont	1,351	21.5	▲5.7
Labour	Hayley Conboy	450	7.2	▲3.5
Residents Association	Josephine Herbert	326	5.2	▲5.2
Green	Jane Holt	289	4.6	▼0.2
BNP	Robert Lassen	217	3.4	▼6.6
Majority		2,309	36.7	▼10.9
Turnout		6,311	76.0	
Conservative hold		Swing	▼5.4	

Lyndon
Party	Candidate	Votes	%	±%
Liberal Democrats	Theresa Tedd	3,552	51.7	▲2.9
Conservative	Greg Goldingay	1,819	26.5	▲0.4
Labour	Margaret Brittin	803	11.7	▲5.5
BNP	David Reynolds	559	8.1	▼4.6
Green	Frances Grice	137	2.0	▼0.5
Majority		1,733	25.2	▲2.5
Turnout		6,854	68.3	
Liberal Democrats hold		Swing	▲1.2	

Meriden
Party	Candidate	Votes	%	±%
Conservative	Ken Allsopp	3,845	55.9	▼16.1
Liberal Democrats	Hugh McCredie	1,362	19.8	▲10.8
Labour	Cathy Connan	928	13.5	▲6.1
Residents Association	Wayne Wright	369	5.4	▲5.4
BNP	Russell Phillips	228	3.3	▼3.4
Green	Roger King	143	2.1	▼2.8
Majority		2,483	36.1	▼26.9
Turnout		6,899	73.2	
Conservative hold		Swing	▼13.4	

Olton
Party	Candidate	Votes	%	±%
Liberal Democrats	John Windmill	3,513	50.7	▼3.1
Conservative	Robert Hulland	2,336	33.7	▲0.4
Labour	Alan Jacques	524	7.6	▲2.9
BNP	Stanley Williams	297	4.3	▲4.3
Green	Joel Butler	164	2.4	▼0.8
Residents Association	Peter Chan	94	1.4	▲1.4
Majority		1,177	17.0	▼3.6
Turnout		6,960	71.0	
Liberal Democrats hold		Swing	▼1.7	

Shirley East
Party	Candidate	Votes	%	±%
Liberal Democrats	Ian Hedley	2,439	38.8	▼5.5
Conservative	Mark Parker	2,257	35.9	▼6.5
Residents Association (Independent)	Neill Watts	605	9.6	▲9.6
Labour	Kevin Raven	575	9.1	▲3.8
BNP	Raymond Bailey	284	4.5	▲4.5
Green	Joy Aldworth	129	2.1	▼0.2
Majority		182	2.9	▲0.9
Turnout		6,315	72.2	
Liberal Democrats hold		Swing	▲0.5	

Shirley South
Party	Candidate	Votes	%	±%
Liberal Democrats	Andy Hodgson	2,989	42.9	▲5.9
Conservative	Phil Brandum	2,299	33.0	▼5.5
Residents Association	Trevor Eames	599	8.6	▲8.6
Labour	Shirley Young	569	8.2	▲3.4
BNP	Christopher White	398	5.7	▼8.1
Green	Adam Cooley	121	1.7	▲0.2
Majority		690	9.9	▲8.4
Turnout		6,987	70.3	
Liberal Democrats hold		Swing	▲5.7	

Shirley West
Party	Candidate	Votes	%	±%
Liberal Democrats	Simon Slater	2,855	44.1	▲0.2
Conservative	Hannah Tildesley	1,988	30.7	▲3.8
Labour	Ian McDonald	715	11.0	▲6.1
BNP	Douglas Maund	432	6.7	▼5.4
Residents Association	John Rogers	320	4.9	▲4.9
Green	Trevor Barker	162	2.5	▼1.1
Majority		867	13.4	▼3.6
Turnout		6,498	70.1	
Liberal Democrats hold		Swing	▼1.8	

Silhill
Party	Candidate	Votes	%	±%
Conservative	Shiela Pittaway	3,090	46.3	▼3.3
Liberal Democrats	Steve Green	2,447	36.7	▲2.5
Labour	Janet Marsh	603	9.0	▲4.8
BNP	Alan Ashmore	329	4.9	▼4.7
Green	Roderick Palmer	116	1.7	▼0.1
Residents Association	Hilary Twinberrow	87	1.3	▲1.3
Majority		643	9.6	▼5.8
Turnout		6,702	71.4	
Conservative hold		Swing	▼2.9	

Smith's Wood
Party	Candidate	Votes	%	±%
Labour	Donald Cornock	1,368	32.5	▲4.3
Green	Ken Meeson	1,019	24.2	▼21.0
Conservative	Catherine Price	821	19.5	▼2.0
BNP	Frank O'Brien	550	13.1	▲13.1
Liberal Democrats	Tony Ludlow	398	9.4	▲4.4
Residents Association	Rebecca Hammond	57	1.4	▲1.4
Majority		349	8.3	▼8.7
Turnout		4,222	48.0	
Labour hold		Swing	▲12.6	

St. Alphege
Party	Candidate	Votes	%	±%
Conservative	Stuart Davis	4,525	57.6	▼5.1
Liberal Democrats	Eimear Fossey	2,370	30.2	▲16.1
Labour	Paul Tuxworth	497	6.3	▲3.1
Residents Association	Steven O'Nyons	241	3.1	▲3.1
Green	Stephen Holt	220	2.8	Steady
Majority		2,155	27.4	▼21.2
Turnout		7,877	76.3	
Conservative hold		Swing	▼10.6	

== By-elections between 2010 and 2011 ==
Olton by-election 20 January 2011
Party	Candidate	Votes	%	±%
Liberal Democrats	Claire O'Kane	1,188	39.7	▼11.0
Conservative	David Price	1,179	39.4	▲5.7
Labour	Andrew Mullinex	280	9.4	▲1.8
Residents Association	Hayley Watts	228	7.6	▼6.3
Green	Ian Jamieson	115	3.8	▲1.5
Majority		9	0.3	▼16.7
Turnout		2,990	30.6	▼40.4
Liberal Democrats hold		Swing	▼8.3	
