= 2006 Solihull Metropolitan Borough Council election =

NojawanJatoiIthadPakistan

(2004 ←) 2006 United Kingdom local elections (→ 2007)

Map of the results of the 2006 Solihull election. Conservatives in blue, Liberal Democrats in yellow, Labour in red and British National Party in dark blue.

The 2006 Solihull Metropolitan Borough Council election took place on 4 May 2006 to elect members of Solihull Metropolitan Borough Council in the West Midlands, England. One third of the council was up for election and the Conservative Party stayed in overall control of the council.

== Campaign ==
Before the election there had been two by-elections resulting in Conservative holds, and a Liberal Democrat defection in Shirley West, with Howard Allen changing to Independent. As such the Conservatives ran the council with 27 seats, compared to 14 for the Liberal Democrats, 8 for Labour and 2 independents. This meant the Liberal Democrats only needed to gain 2 seats to deprive the Conservatives of a majority, with predictions in the press that they could achieve this, after gaining the parliamentary seat at the 2005 general election.

The Liberal Democrats campaigned against cuts to Solihull's Music Service, opposed windfall developments and brought the president of the Liberal Democrats Simon Hughes to Solihull to open their local election campaign. The Conservative leader of the council Ted Richards predicted their record would enable them to stay in control and the party supported the expansion of Birmingham Airport and the bringing of a Super Casino to the region, both of which the Liberal Democrats opposed. Other issues in the election included proposals for the regeneration of Shirley and Chelmsley Wood, and a plan to transform northern Solihull. Apart from the 3 parties with seats on the council, there were also candidates from the British National Party, Green Party and 2 independents in Shirley, both of whom former incumbent Conservative councillors for the old Shirley seats.

All 3 of the main party group leaders from the Conservatives, Liberal Democrat and Labour parties signed a pledge to avoid damaging race relations during the campaign.

== Election result ==
The results saw the Conservative keep control of the council, but with their majority reduced to just 1 seat. The Conservative majority was reduced after the Liberal Democrats gained Shirley South from the Conservatives, meaning the Conservatives had 26 seats compared to 15 for the Liberal Democrats. The British National Party won a first seat on the council after winning Chelmsley Wood ward from Labour by 19 votes after a recount. This reduced Labour to 7 seats, while the 2 independent councillors were not defending seats at the election. Overall turnout in the election was 38.4%.

The successful British National Party candidate George Morgan described his win as a victory for the ordinary working man and put his success down to disillusionment with politicians, immigration and local social issues such as rubbish. Meanwhile, the defeated Labour candidate blamed recent events involving the national Labour government for his defeat. Following the election the other councillors from the Conservative, Liberal Democrat and Labour parties said they would have nothing to do with the British National Party councillor.

Solihull local election result 2006
Party	Seats	Gains	Losses	Net gain/loss	Seats %	Votes %	Votes	+/−
Conservative	10	0	1	-1	58.8	46.3	26,822	-7.7%
Liberal Democrats	5	1	0	+1	29.4	34.1	19,785	+1.0%
Labour	1	0	1	-1	5.9	11.0	6,386	+0.4%
BNP	1	1	0	+1	5.9	3.7	2,139	+3.1%
Green	0	0	0	0	0	2.9	1,679	+2.9%
Independent	0	0	0	0	0	2.0	1,164	+0.5%

This result had the following consequences for the total number of seats on the council after the elections :

Party	Previous council	New council
Conservatives	27	26
Liberal Democrat	14	15
Labour	8	7
Independent	2	2
BNP	0	1
Total	51	51
Working majority	3	1

== Ward results ==
Bickenhill
Party	Candidate	Votes	%	±%
Conservative	Alan Martin	1,942	64.5	+33.3
Labour	Arthur Harper	581	19.3	+7.9
Liberal Democrats	Anthony Verduyn	487	16.2	+7.3
Majority		1,361	45.2	+27.9
Turnout		3,010	34.1	−6.3
Conservative hold		Swing	+12.7	

Blythe
Party	Candidate	Votes	%	±%
Conservative	Brian Burgess	1,662	46.5	+3.1
Liberal Democrats	Charles Robinson	1,509	42.2	−4.3
Green	Pauline Smith	226	6.3	+6.3
Labour	Rajeshwar Singh	181	5.1	−5.1
Majority		153	4.3	+1.2
Turnout		3,578	38.8	−1.7
Conservative hold		Swing	+3.7	

Castle Bromwich
Party	Candidate	Votes	%	±%
Conservative	Michael Robinson	2,277	68.1	+3.7
Liberal Democrats	Andrew Bull	684	20.5	+4.6
Labour	Mohammed Rashid	381	11.4	−8.3
Majority		1,593	47.7	+2.9
Turnout		3,342	37.2	−1.1
Conservative hold		Swing	-0.4	

Chelmsley Wood
Party	Candidate	Votes	%	±%
BNP	George Morgan	707	33.0	+7.1
Labour	Nicholas Stephens	688	32.1	−8.0
Conservative	Martin McCarthy	451	21.1	+1.6
Liberal Democrats	James-Morgan Tudor	295	13.8	−0.7
Majority		19	0.9	−13.3
Turnout		2,141	26.2	+0.7
BNP gain from Labour		Swing	+7.5	

Dorridge and Hockley Heath
Party	Candidate	Votes	%	±%
Conservative	Ian Courts	2,435	63.8	+4.6
Liberal Democrats	Jennifer Wright	913	23.9	−4.7
Green	Pamela Archer	290	7.6	+7.6
Labour	Michelle Cluney	177	4.6	−7.5
Majority		1,522	39.9	+9.4
Turnout		3,815	45.4	−2.2
Conservative hold		Swing	+4.6	

Elmdon
Party	Candidate	Votes	%	±%
Conservative	Kenneth Hawkins	1,987	49.3	+4.5
Liberal Democrats	Jean Hamilton	1,699	42.1	+1.8
Labour	Irma Shaw	346	8.6	−6.3
Majority		288	7.1	+2.7
Turnout		4,032	43.5	+2.0
Conservative hold		Swing	+1.3	

Kingshurst and Fordbridge
Party	Candidate	Votes	%	±%
Conservative	Robert Hall	814	39.4	+1.1
Labour	Florence Nash	776	37.6	−2.6
Liberal Democrats	Brynn-Dafydd Tudor	476	23.0	+1.6
Majority		38	1.8	−0.0
Turnout		2,066	24.9	+0.7
Conservative hold		Swing	+1.8	

Knowle
Party	Candidate	Votes	%	±%
Conservative	Diana Holl-Allen	2,231	58.3	−3.3
Liberal Democrats	Geoffrey Berry	1,231	32.2	+7.5
Green	Jane Holt	228	6.0	+6.0
Labour	Lisa Holcroft	136	3.6	−10.1
Majority		1,000	26.1	−10.7
Turnout		3,826	47.4	+2.6
Conservative hold		Swing	-5.3	

Lyndon
Party	Candidate	Votes	%	±%
Liberal Democrats	Robert Reeves	2,079	59.3	+0.8
Conservative	Shailesh Parekh	752	21.4	−7.4
Labour	Margaret Brittin	368	10.5	−2.3
Green	Frances Grice	309	8.8	+8.8
Majority		1,327	37.8	+8.2
Turnout		3,508	36.1	−2.0
Liberal Democrats hold		Swing	+4.1	

Meriden
Party	Candidate	Votes	%	±%
Conservative	Kenneth Allsopp	2,405	67.8	+4.9
Liberal Democrats	Peter Whitlock	704	19.8	−2.6
Labour	Jonathan Maltman	439	12.4	−2.3
Majority		1,701	47.9	+7.5
Turnout		3,548	39.2	−1.7
Conservative hold		Swing	+3.7	

Olton
Party	Candidate	Votes	%	±%
Liberal Democrats	John Windmill	2,091	52.2	+1.0
Conservative	Peter Groom	1,465	36.6	+2.1
Green	Elaine Williams	241	6.0	+0.1
Labour	Alan Jacques	209	5.2	−3.2
Majority		626	15.6	−1.0
Turnout		4,006	43.2	−1.9
Liberal Democrats hold		Swing	-0.5	

Shirley East
Party	Candidate	Votes	%	±%
Liberal Democrats	Ian Hedley	1,394	38.8	−14.6
Conservative	Joseph Tildesley	1,113	31.0	−6.7
Independent	Neil Watts	877	24.4	+24.4
Labour	Kevin Raven	205	5.7	−3.1
Majority		281	7.8	−7.9
Turnout		3,589	43.0	−3.2
Liberal Democrats hold		Swing	-3.9	

Shirley South
Party	Candidate	Votes	%	±%
Liberal Democrats	Andrew Hodgson	1,529	38.2	+6.5
Conservative	John Hawkswood	1,242	31.0	−21.0
BNP	Charles Shipman	658	16.4	+16.4
Labour	Ian McDonald	290	7.2	−9.1
Independent	Rosemary Worsley	287	7.2	+7.2
Majority		287	7.2	−13.2
Turnout		4,006	42.5	+2.1
Liberal Democrats gain from Conservative		Swing	+13.8	

Shirley West
Party	Candidate	Votes	%	±%
Liberal Democrats	Simon Slater	1,546	42.1	−10.5
Conservative	Anne Forder	889	24.2	−14.2
BNP	Victoria Coombes	774	21.1	+21.1
Labour	Shirley Young	249	6.8	−2.2
Green	Trevor Barker	212	5.8	+5.8
Majority		657	17.9	+3.7
Turnout		3,670	41.0	+2.8
Liberal Democrats hold		Swing	+1.8	

Silhill
Party	Candidate	Votes	%	±%
Conservative	Sheila Pittaway	2,061	57.8	+6.4
Liberal Democrats	Brenda Davies	1,181	33.1	+3.4
Labour	Janet Marsh	324	9.1	−2.5
Majority		880	24.7	+3.0
Turnout		3,566	41.7	−1.5
Conservative hold		Swing	+1.5	

Smith's Wood
Party	Candidate	Votes	%	±%
Labour	Donald Cornock	852	46.8	−0.3
Conservative	Daniel Kettle	629	34.5	+1.4
Liberal Democrats	Nigel Dyer	341	18.7	−1.1
Majority		223	12.2	−1.7
Turnout		1,822	21.9	−1.6
Labour hold		Swing	-0.8	

St. Alphege
Party	Candidate	Votes	%	±%
Conservative	Stuart Davis	2,467	55.4	−8.3
Liberal Democrats	Kenneth Rushen	1,626	36.5	+9.7
Labour	Paul Tuxworth	184	4.1	−5.3
Green	Philippa Austin	173	3.9	+3.9
Majority		841	18.9	−17.9
Turnout		4,450	45.5	+0.9
Conservative hold		Swing	-9.0	
