= Bison industrialised building system =

Concrete building system

The Bison industrialised building system is a precast concrete building system used in high rise flats, developed by Bison Manufacturing Ltd, Dartford, Kent, England.

== History ==
Bison Manufacturing was founded in 1919 to build military pill-boxes.

The Bison wall-frame construction system was a construction method used in tower block construction. It was launched in 1963 by Concrete Ltd who set up factories across the UK to pre-fabricate the parts it. It was not a frame structure as such, instead precast concrete panels formed the structure of high rise blocks. It evolved into a rapid construction method.

In tower blocks over 12 storeys in height, all of the walls were loadbearing - external and internal. Whilst there were no partition walls, the internal walls were still thinner at 6 inches in thickness. Two-bedroom flats could be constructed out of 21 pre-cast concrete pieces. The bathroom and toilet elements could be constructed from a similarly few number of pre-fabricated pieces. The lift shaft and staircases could be constructed out of pieces that were 3 storeys high. The method was limited in that it was only really practical for two and three-bedroom flats.

== See also ==
- Chelmsley Wood
