= Smith's Wood Academy =

Coordinates: 52.4979°N 1.7450°W

Location
- Windward Way; Smith's Wood; Birmingham, West Midlands, B36 0UE; England

Information
- Type: Academy
- School district: Smith’s Wood
- Local authority: Solihull
- Trust: Fairfax Multi-Academy Trust
- Department for Education URN: 143895 Tables
- Ofsted: Reports
- Head of Academy: Mr Stephen Huntington
- Gender: Mixed
- Age: 11 to 16
- Enrolment: 966 as of August 2020
- Language: English
- Colours: Red, Black
- Website: http://smithswood.co.uk/

Smith's Wood Academy (formerly Smith's Wood School and then Smith's Wood Sports College) is a co-educational secondary school located in Smith's Wood in the West Midlands of England.

Smith's Wood School was awarded specialist Sports College status in September 2006 and was renamed Smith's Wood Sports College. Formerly a community school administered by Solihull Metropolitan Borough Council, in April 2017 Smith's Wood Sports College converted to academy status and was renamed Smith's Wood Academy. The school is now sponsored by the Fairfax Multi-Academy Trust.

== Teaching ==
Smith's Wood Academy offers GCSEs and BTECs as programmes of study for pupils.

== History ==
=== Fire in 1977 ===
A fire on Saturday 1 October 1977 destroyed changing rooms.
