= St Nicholas' Church, Elmdon =

St Nicholas’ Church, Elmdon
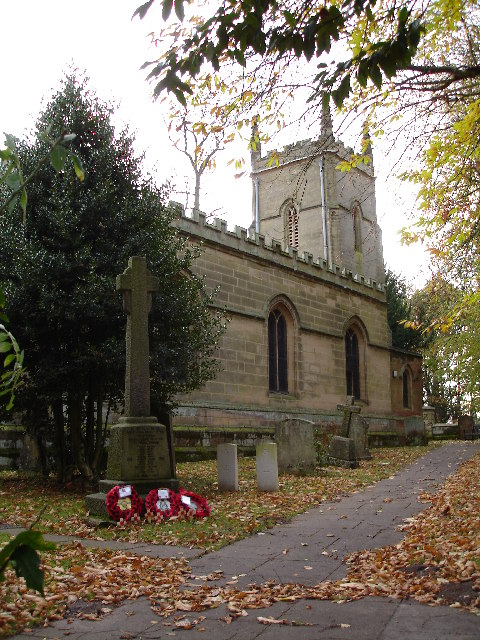
- St Nicholas’ Church, Elmdon
- St Nicholas’ Church, Elmdon
- 52°26′31.31″N 1°45′47.17″W
- OS grid reference: SP 16227 82767
- Location: Birmingham
- Country: England
- Denomination: Church of England
- Churchmanship: Evangelical
- Website: elmdonchurch.org

History
- Dedication: St Nicholas

Architecture
- Heritage designation: Grade II listed
- Architect: John Standbridge of Warwick
- Groundbreaking: 1780
- Completed: 1781

Specifications
- Capacity: 150 persons
- Length: 74 feet (23 m)
- Width: 32 feet (9.8 m)

Administration
- Diocese: Anglican Diocese of Birmingham
- Archdeaconry: Aston
- Deanery: Solihull
- Parish: Elmdon, St Nicholas

St Nicholas’ Church, Elmdon is a Grade II listed Church of England parish church in Birmingham.

== History ==
The Elmdon estate was purchased in 1760 by Birmingham banker, Abraham Spooner (ca. 1690–1788). Elmdon Hall was stated in 1780 and at the same time, he demolished the old medieval church, and constructed a new one adjacent to Elmdon Hall (demolished in 1956), to the designs of John Standbridge of Warwick. It was altered in 1864 and restored in 1880 at a cost of £640.

The church was extended in 1979 when a new nave was added to the south.

== Monuments ==
- Isaac Spooner 1816, by Seaborne of Birmingham
- Abraham Spooner (d.1788) and his wife Anne (d. 1783)
- Abraham Spooner Lillingston (d. 1836) by Wilkes of Birmingham
- Jane, Dowager Countess of Rosse (d. 1837) by Wilkes of Birmingham
