= Kingshurst =

Village in Solihull, England

Coordinates: 52.488°N 1.7480°W

- Village and civil parish
- Location within the West Midlands
- Interactive map showing parish boundary
- Population: 8,348 (2021 census)
- Civil parish: Kingshurst
- Metropolitan borough: Solihull
- Metropolitan county: West Midlands
- Region: West Midlands
- Country: England
- Sovereign state: United Kingdom
- Post town: Birmingham
- Postcode district: B37
- Dialling code: 0121
- Police: West Midlands
- Fire: West Midlands
- Ambulance: West Midlands
- UK Parliament: Meriden and Solihull East

Kingshurst is a post-war suburban village and civil parish in the Metropolitan Borough of Solihull, in the West Midlands, England. Historically part of the county of Warwickshire, it lies about 7 miles (11 km) north of Solihull town centre and 10 miles (16 km) east of Birmingham; it borders North Warwickshire to the east, and is adjacent to Fordbridge and Smith's Wood.

== History ==
The name Kingshurst comes from having previously been a Royal Manor, and "hurst" meaning wood. The earliest record of Kingshurst is in documents from the late 13th and early 14th centuries, when it is referred to as part of the Manor of Coleshill. Tenant farming was administered from here and Simon de Montford of Coleshill was a nobleman who built a moated manor house in Kingshurst.

=== Kingshurst Hall manor house ===
Kingshurst Hall was a large country manor house surrounded by a moat with a park and farmlands. It was built around 1390 by Sir William Montfort, son of Sir Baldwin Montfort. Kingshurst took on an independent existence from Coleshill with the arrival of the Mountfords. It is unclear how Kingshurst came into their possession although it is probable that they bought the area around 1332 from the Clintons, who were then lords of the manor at Coleshill. What is certain is that they were in possession by about 1352. The manor house was demolished in 1969 to accommodate post war housing for the ever expanding nearby Birmingham.

=== Yorkswood Forest ===
During World War I, much of the woodland in Kingshurst was cut down to help with the war effort. The Birmingham and District Association of Boy Scouts were able to buy a patch of land from the Meriden Rural District at a bargain price and set up a permanent camp there. This land was halfway between Kingshurst and Shard End. It was called Yorkswood and opened in 1923. There were five camp fields, covering an area of 25 acres (100,000 m^{2}). The total site was over 200 acres (0.81 km^{2}). The site benefited from permanent washhouses and latrines, a swimming-pool, a training centre and headquarters, guesthouse, warden's hut and other huts. A small brook from a fresh water spring ran past the camp and Cock Sparrow Farm was about 100 yards (91 m) away to provide fresh milk.

The entrance to the camp was flanked by a series of griffin statues. These had come from the roof of Lewis's Department Store on Corporation Street in Birmingham when it was being renovated. After the camp closed in 1972, they were placed on the housing estate over the border in Birmingham's Kendrick Avenue and nearby roads built upon the site of the camp. The forest acts as a border between Birmingham and Solihull to this day.

=== Post-war development ===
After World War II, housing was needed to allocate civilians who had been bombed out of their homes in the nearby city of Birmingham. The Birmingham Corporation purchased the site which is now the eastern part of the village from Meriden Rural District Council in 1949. Here was erected tower blocks, maisonettes and council housing nestled in the Warwickshire countryside. A few thousand families from the slums of inner city Birmingham migrated to the rural village in start of a new beginning. Bus routes were created to bridge transport connectivity between the village and the city.

The private development to the east of Gilson Way are detached and semi detached dwellings, they are the most expensive homes in north Solihull behind Castle Bromwich and Marston Green. The roads in this area are named after nearby Warwickshire villages, eg: Moxhull Road, Gilson Way, Meriden Drive. The shopping precinct was built in the 1960s and was at the time "state of the art". It was demolished in 2023 to make way for the redevelopment of Kingshurst. Nearby Shard End, Fordbridge, Chelmsley Wood and Smith's Wood began to swallow up the rural landscape around Kingshurst in the 1960s and 70s as part of an extended overspill for housing in the wider Birmingham metropolitan area. The M6 was also built during this time, it created a natural border between the Metropolitan Borough of Solihull and North Warwickshire, where rural green belt is still present.

== Governance ==
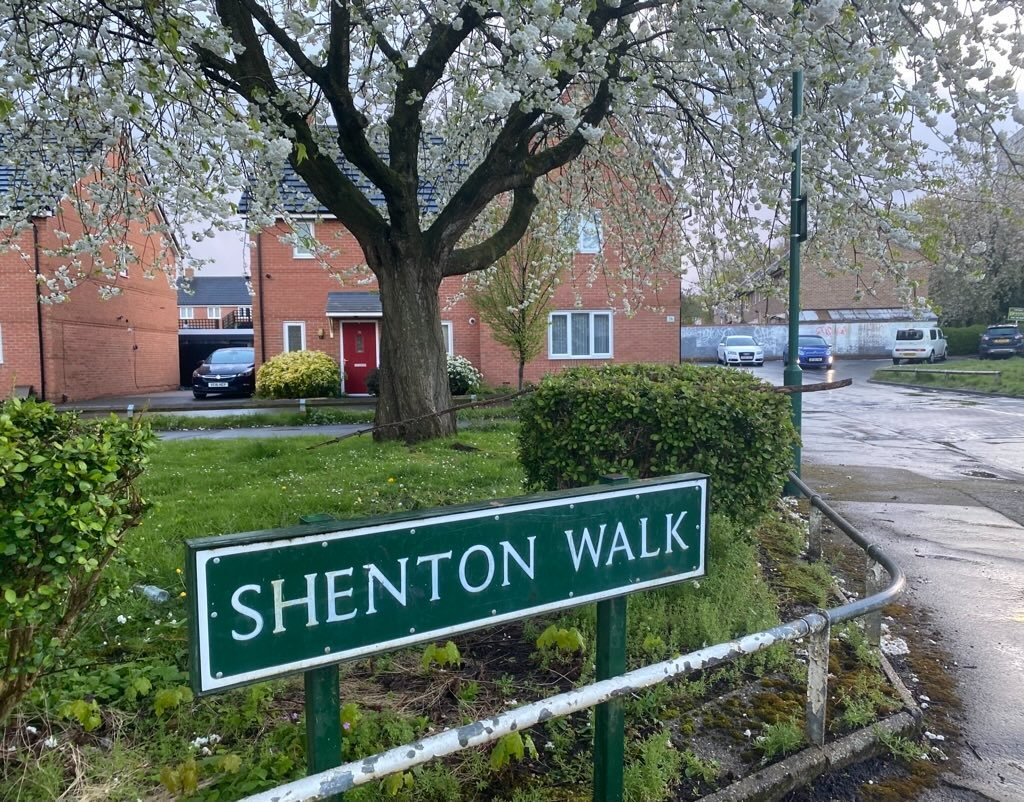
A road in Kingshurst village

At the lower level of local government, Kingshurst is a civil parish with a parish council, to which it elects 12 members every four years. The parish was created in 1956 when Kingshurst was developed.

At the upper level of local government, Kingshurst is in the Metropolitan Borough of Solihull. For elections to Solihull Metropolitan Borough Council, it is in the electoral ward Kingshurst & Fordbridge. Since 2016, Solihull has been a constituent of the West Midlands Combined Authority.

Historically, the Kingshurst area was in Coleshill parish in Warwickshire. It was in the Meriden Rural District of the administrative county of Warwickshire from 1894 until 1974, when it became part of Solihull in the metropolitan county of West Midlands.

=== Parliamentary constituency ===
For elections to the House of Commons, most of Kingshurst is in the Meriden and Solihull East parliamentary constituency, represented by Saqib Bhatti of the Conservative Party since 2019. Following boundary changes in 2024, a small section of the north east of the parish is in Birmingham Hodge Hill and Solihull North constituency, joining their Solihull neighbours Smith's Wood and Castle Bromwich.

== Demographics ==
At the 2021 census, Kingshurst had a population of 8,348 people in 3,280 households.

91% of the Kingshurst population are white and 9% from an ethnic minority background. Kingshurst has a proportionally smaller ethnic minority population than either Solihull (18%) or England (19%). 44% of the ethnic minority population in Kingshurst are from a mixed or multiple ethnic group representing 6% of the total population.

50% of Kingshurst households own (or part own) their own home either outright or through a mortgage. The most common type of homes in Kingshurst are detached, semi-detached and terraced houses. Flats and apartments make up 26% of Kingshurst properties with most of them leased by Solihull Community Housing.

Census population of Kingshurst parish
Census	Population	Female	Male	Households	Source
2001	8,126	4,298	3,828	3,214	
2011	7,868	4,126	3,742	3,242	
2021	8,348	4,429	3,919	3,280	

== Economy ==
Kingshurst is a adjacent to Birmingham Airport, NEC (National Exhibition Centre), Birmingham Business Park and the Jaguar Land Rover plant in Elmdon.

== Community facilities ==
The centre of Kingshurst dates from the 1950s and is located around Marston Drive and Gilson Way. Kingshurst library is located on Marston Drive, alongside the village post office, optician, hair salon, pharmacy and a Co-operative store. Since 2021, the shopping area has been undergoing major redevelopment by Solihull Council and West Midlands Combined Authority. The masterplan includes 75-80 new social and privately owned housing, a new park, four retail outlets, village hall and a coffee house. The new high street will be named "Boulevard".

The Pavilions Club on Meriden Drive was built in the 1960s, then modernised in 2016. It is a sports and social club with kitchen facilities. On the site is the Kingshurst field which is owned by the Parish council in a covenant going back to the 1950s. The club is used for football, rugby, horse-riding and other community activities.

Kingshurst Allotment garden is a community-run space sponsored by Kingshurst Parish Council. It contains two bee hives that produce local 'Kingshurst Honey', and various beds for plantations of fruits and vegetables. The open-air kitchen space is used to teach local children culinary art techniques and there is a play area with a frog pond nearby which contributes to biodiversity. The garden is the first of its kind in Solihull, and the project took place between 2023 and 2024 by sponsors and volunteers from Birmingham Airport, Galliford Try and other companies. The allotment dates back to the 1940s.

=== Parks and nature ===
Babbs Mill Lake is located to the south of the village adjacent to the Yorkswood forest amid the Kingfisher Country Park on Fordbridge Road. The River Cole runs through the southernmost point of the village within the park. Foxes, wild deer and badgers are the most common form of wildlife in this area. Kingshurst Park is located off Gilson Way and Marston Drive behind the New Testament Church of God car park. Popular with dog walkers, cyclists and joggers. It is popular in the summer months with the field being a popular picnic spot. The children's play area is the main facility with the freedom to play outdoor games and activities. The park is included in the masterplan to regenerate the area.

== Transport ==
There are four main bus routes that run through Kingshurst. The 99 from Kingshurst to Solihull, the X12 to Solihull, the 95 into Birmingham, and the 71 to Sutton Coldfield.

== Education ==
There are three primary schools, Kingshurst Primary School, St. Anthonys Catholic Primary, Yorkswood Primary and four Kindergarten preparatory groups. The most attended secondary schools for Kingshurst children are Tudor Grange Academy Kingshurst on Cooks Lane, John Henry Newman Catholic College on Chelmsley Road. The Coleshill School in Warwickshire, and Smith's Wood Academy across the Chester Road in Smith's Wood. The nearest independent school is Solihull School in Solihull town centre.

== Churches ==
There are four places of worship in Kingshurst. The Anglican church is dedicated to St Barnabas and is situated off Church Close, the Catholic church on Oakthorpe Drive is dedicated to St Anthony, the Pentecostal Church situated in Gilson Way, New Testament Church of God (Cleveland, Tennessee). And the Evangelical church, United Church Solihull, situated on Cooks Lane.

== Notable residents ==
Gary Shaw, the former Aston Villa footballer, was born at a house on Meriden Drive in January 1961 and lived there until the 1980s, by which time he was established as a key player at Villa.

Singer, songwriter and producer Lady Leshurr was born and raised in Kingshurst.
