= Elmdon, West Midlands =

Coordinates: 52.44202°N 1.75869°W

Elmdon
- Village
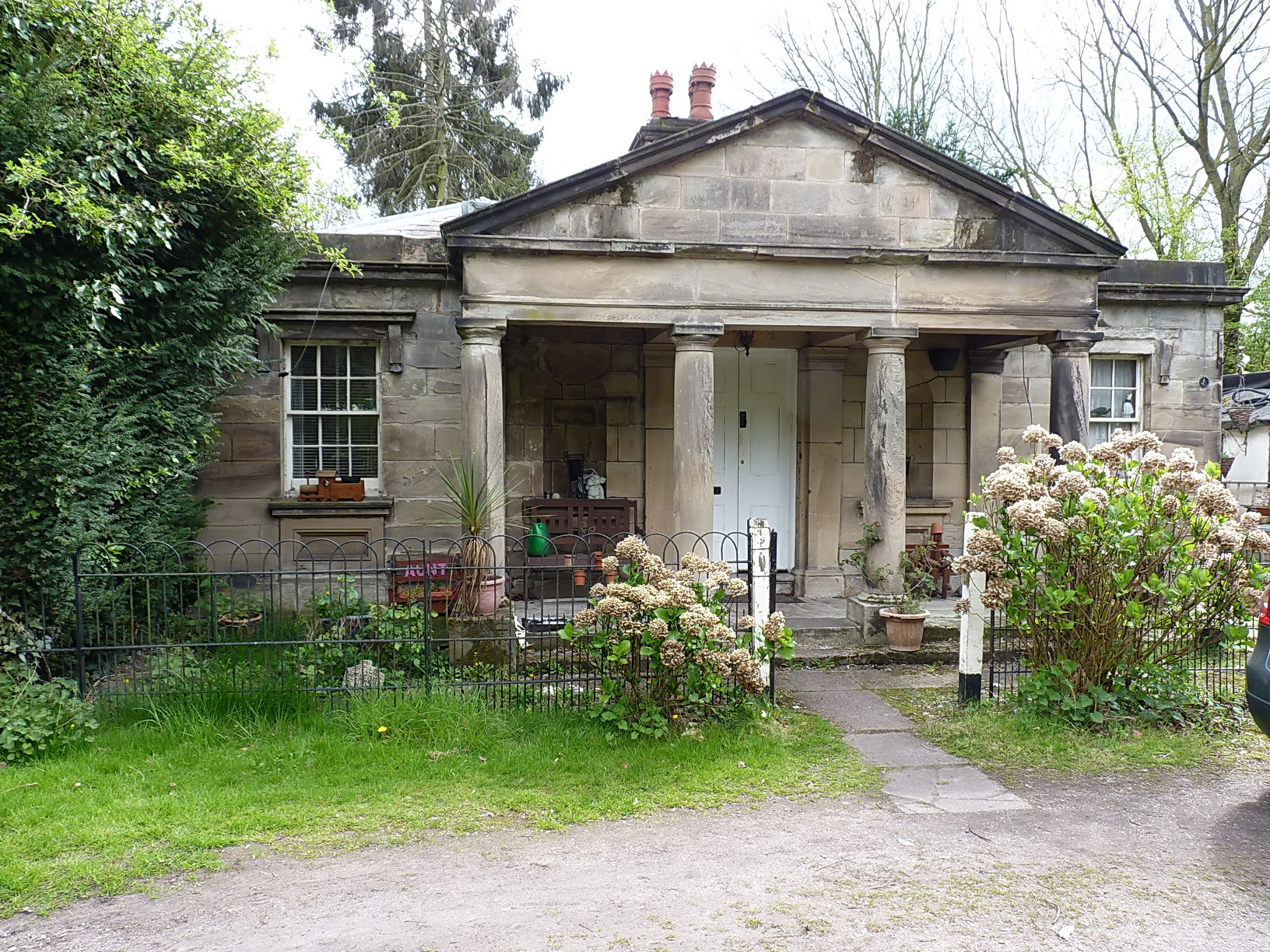
- Elmdon Hall Lodge

- Location within the West Midlands
- OS grid reference: SP165827
- Civil parish: Bickenhill and Marston Green
- Metropolitan borough: Solihull
- Metropolitan county: West Midlands
- Region: West Midlands
- Country: England
- Sovereign state: United Kingdom
- Post town: SOLIHULL
- Postcode district: B92
- Post town: BIRMINGHAM
- Postcode district: B26
- Dialling code: 0121
- UK Parliament: Meriden and Solihull East

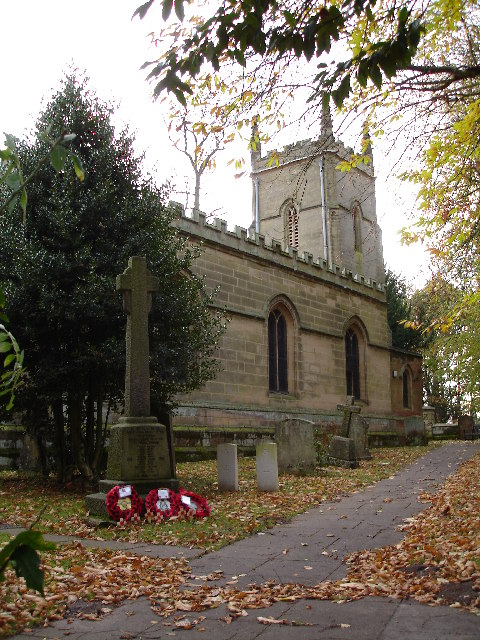
The picturesque Elmdon Parish Church dates from 1780.

Elmdon is a suburban village in the civil parish of Bickenhill and Marston Green, in the Solihull district, in the county of the West Midlands, England. It is in the ancient county of Warwickshire. The population of this Solihull Ward at the 2011 census was 12,067. In 1931 the parish had a population of 225. On 1 April 1932 the parish was abolished and merged with Bickenhill and Solihull Urban.

The name Elmdon means hill of the elms. It is primarily a residential area. It was formerly home to Elmdon Aerodrome, which is now Birmingham Airport. Elmdon Parish Church dates from 1780 and overlooks the Rover Works, home of Land Rover since 1946.

Whilst mention is made in the Domesday Book of Elmdon, as being in the Hemlingford Hundred, it was little more than an estate until the opening of the Birmingham-Coventry turnpike through the parish created an important junction and staging-post where the modern Coventry Road crosses Old Damson Lane/Elmdon Lane. The focus of the village moved from the area immediately surrounding what is now the parish church (i.e. the Elmdon Hall estate and its vicinity) to this junction.

Notable residents of Elmdon Hall include the Spooner and Alston families, after whom nearby Alston Road is named. William Wilberforce lived in Elmdon for some time after his marriage to Barbara Spooner; the church's Wilberforce Hall is named after him.

Local legend has it that the ancient Sweet Chestnut tree on top of the 'elm-don', now in Elmdon Park, was planted by Thomas Becket. Its sister tree, which once demarcated the farthest extent of the Elmdon estate, is several miles away at the junction of Lode Lane and Solihull By-Pass/Seven Star Road on the outskirts of Solihull town centre. The northern suburbs of Solihull as far as the Coventry Road, and the entire Land Rover factory, are built on land that was once part of the estate. Much of this land was sold for development and agriculture in 1920, and the rest in 1930. The hall and its much-depleted grounds remained.

In 1944 the hall itself was sold to Solihull Council, who initially used it to house the Home Guard, and demolished it in 1956. Two stone eagles which once topped the gateposts at the gatehouse on the Coventry Road were removed by the Royal Air Force to decorate an airbase. In its final years the hall was dilapidated, a favourite haunt for local children. The council turned the land into Elmdon Park and a handful of private residences.

Elmdon Airport opened on land north of the Coventry Road in 1939, but was taken over and closed to civilian use by the Royal Air Force almost immediately, due to the outbreak of World War II. It re-opened after the war, and eventually became Birmingham Airport. The construction of the runways necessitated the closure of Elmdon Lane between the village and Marston Green to the north, and the demolition of Elmdon village itself. Two dwellings remain of the original settlement at the crossroads, and maps still show this point as the centre of Elmdon. The name these days largely refers to the church and park, so the focus of the parish has effectively returned to its pre-turnpike location.

Birmingham International railway station, on the West Coast Main Line, and the National Exhibition Centre, are adjacent to the airport and on the border between Elmdon and Bickenhill.

Solihull Moors Football Club has its stadium, Damson Park, in Elmdon, adjacent to the Land Rover factory and Elmdon Park. Plans for a rail link from the factory to the West Coast Main Line were scrapped when Ford sold Land Rover and Jaguar.
