= Fordbridge =

Town and civil parish in West Midlands, England

Coordinates: 52.484°N 1.749°W

- Civil parish
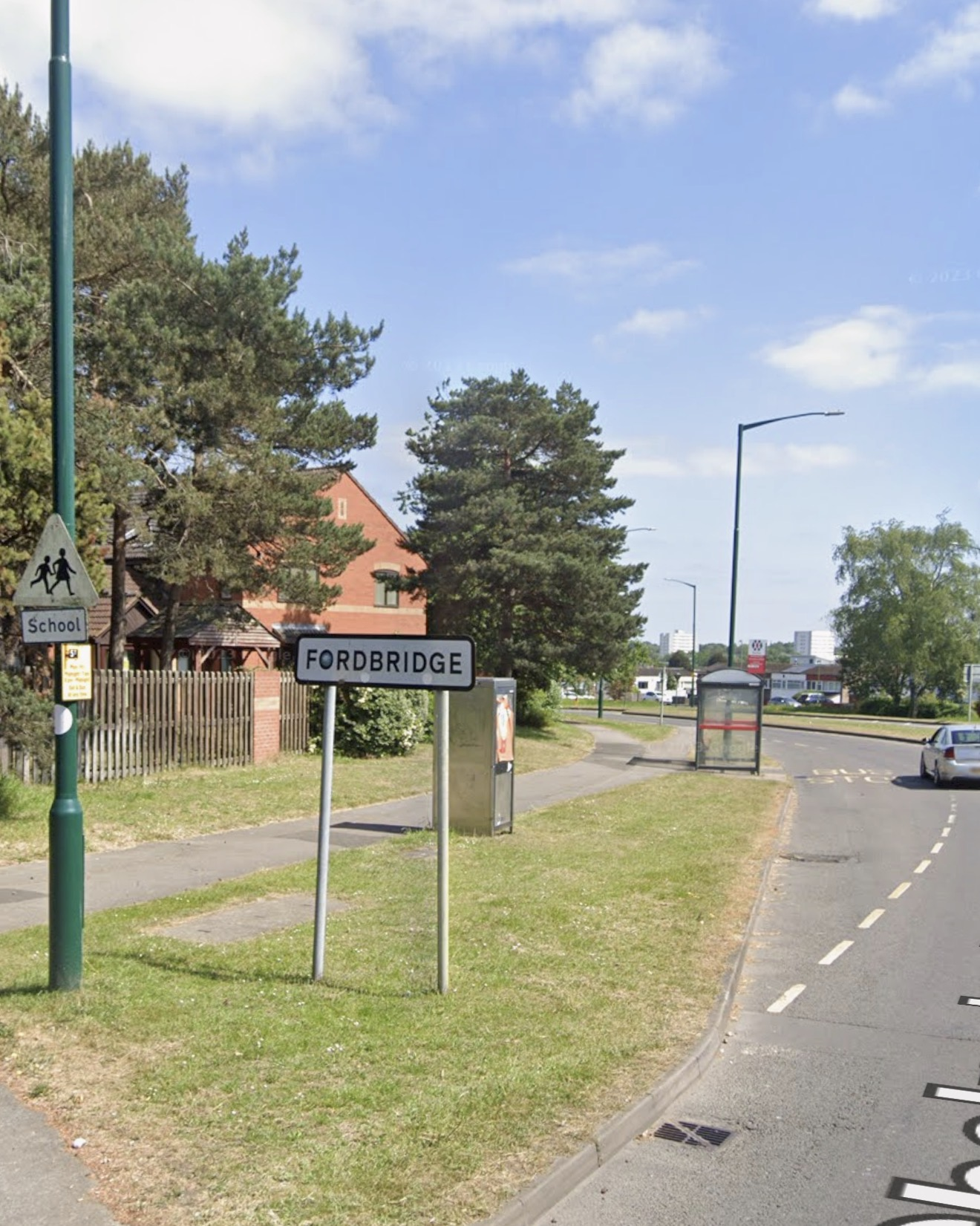

- Location within the West Midlands
- Population: 8,692 (2021 census)
- Civil parish: Fordbridge
- Metropolitan borough: Solihull
- Metropolitan county: West Midlands
- Region: West Midlands
- Country: England
- Sovereign state: United Kingdom
- Post town: Birmingham
- Postcode district: B37
- Dialling code: 0121
- Police: West Midlands
- Fire: West Midlands
- Ambulance: West Midlands
- UK Parliament: Meriden and Solihull East

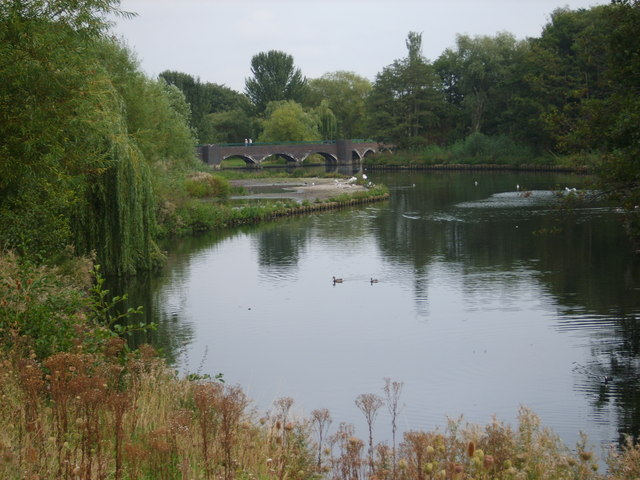
Meriden Park Lake, Fordbridge

Fordbridge is a town and civil parish in the Metropolitan Borough of Solihull in the West Midlands, England. It is part of the Chelmsley Wood estate, encompassing the area west of the River Cole. It lies within the historic boundaries of Warwickshire. According to the 2021 census, the parish had a population of 8,692.

The area of Kingshurst borders Fordbridge at the western point of Cooks Lane. A significant part of the area borders the City of Birmingham district to the west to the south and east.

== Toponymy ==
Fordbridge gets its name from the crossing over the River Cole on Cooks Lane, which was referred to as "Ford Bridge" on 19th century OS maps. This name suggests this site was previously a ford, but eventually a bridge was built on the site of that ford, thus giving the bridge and ultimately the civil parish its name.

== Demographics ==
Census population of Fordbridge parish
Census	Population	Female	Male	Households	Source
2001	8,748	4,490	4,258	3,624	
2011	8,479	4,347	4,132	3,740	
2021	8,692	4,572	4,120	3,745	

== Transport ==
The closest railway station is Marston Green.
