= Bickenhill =

Village in West Midlands, England

Coordinates: 52.439°N 1.725°W

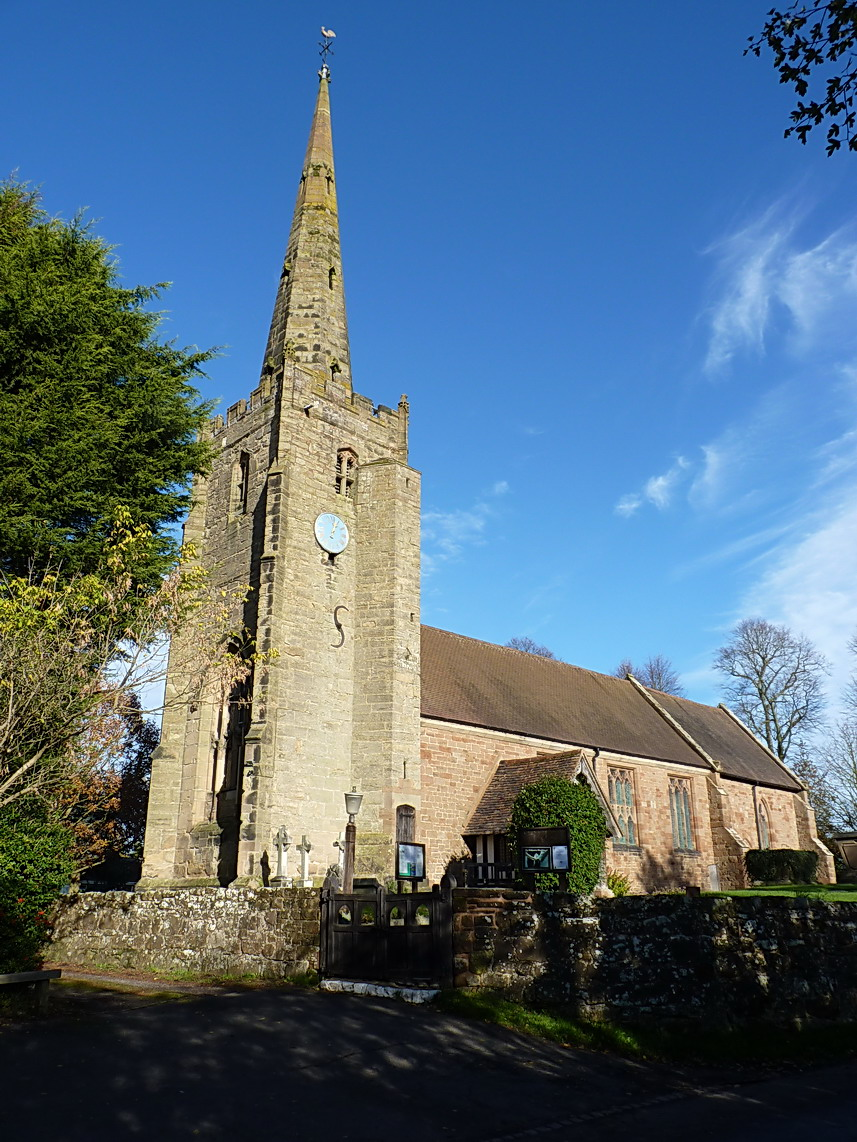
- St Peter's Church in the village

- Location within the West Midlands
- Population: 7,438 (2021 census)
- OS grid reference: SP1882
- Civil parish: Bickenhill and Marston Green
- Metropolitan borough: Solihull
- Metropolitan county: West Midlands
- Region: West Midlands
- Country: England
- Sovereign state: United Kingdom
- Post town: Solihull
- Postcode district: B92
- Post town: Birmingham
- Postcode district: B40
- Dialling code: 0121
- Police: West Midlands
- Fire: West Midlands
- Ambulance: West Midlands
- UK Parliament: Meriden and Solihull East
- Website: bmgpc.org

Bickenhill is a small village in the civil parish of Bickenhill and Marston Green, in the Metropolitan Borough of Solihull, in the West Midlands county, England, on the eastern fringe of the West Midlands conurbation. Bickenhill is also a ward and was within the historic county of Warwickshire. Birmingham Airport is also located within the civil parish.

== History ==
The settlement is of Anglo-Saxon origin, and historically the parish included the manors of Church Bickenhill, Hill Bickenhill, Middle Bickenhill, Marston Culy (now Marston Green), and Wavers Marston. The toponym 'Bickenhill' is derived from the Old English meaning 'Bica's hill', with it spelt as Bichehelle in the Domesday Book of 1086.

The manor of Bickenhill was held by Edward the Confessor, by Alward, and then by Turchil. The manor was recorded as Bichehelle in the Domesday Book of 1086. The descendants of Turchil, the Arden family, settled in the area and adopted the surname 'de Bickenhill,' though spelt differently. The name developed into de Bickenhill in the 13th century. In 1295, Alice de Langley gave herself the title Lady of Bickenhill. A manor then developed in Bickenhill and by the 15th century, there were two manors. It is believed that both manors shared rights by the end of the century. The manors no longer existed by the end of the 16th century.

The parish maintained a rural setting in the 19th century but began to develop in the early 20th century into a populous area due to the industrial revolution. No railway station was opened near the village until Birmingham International at Birmingham Airport opened in 1976.

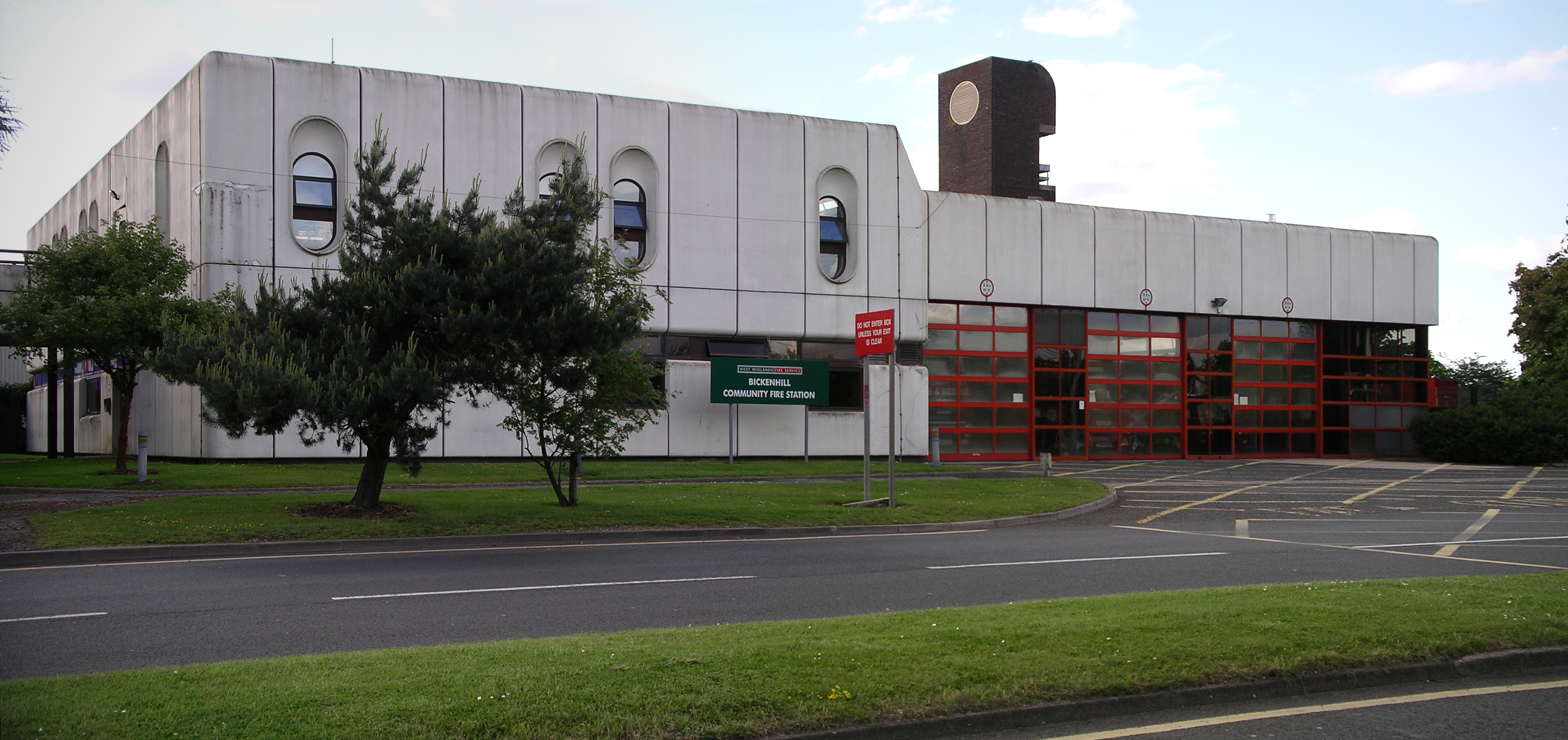
Bickenhill Community Fire Station near the National Exhibition Centre in May 2009

In 2001 there was a possibility that a replacement for Wembley Stadium might be built in the West Midlands. A campaign urging Londoners to oppose the plan used posters with an image of a young footballer saying "One day I'll play at Bickenhill".

In 2003, a proposal was announced to build a second runway at Birmingham Airport which would have reportedly have involved demolition of between 100 and 150 buildings in the Bickenhill conservation area.

== Governance ==
The two main local authorities responsible for the parish are Solihull Metropolitan Borough Council and Bickenhill Parish Council.

The parish council is responsible for maintaining facilities such as churchyards, cemeteries and parks in the parish and its offices are located at a park near Marston Green. The parish histically also included Lyndon (or Lyndon Quarter), a detached portion of the parish two miles west. Lyndon was transferred to Solihull in 1874. Its northern section was later transferred to Birmingham in 1931, while the south became part of Olton, now a suburb of Birmingham. In 1928, Marston Green became a separate ecclesiastical parish, and in 1932, part of Elmdon was added to Bickenhill. The parish was renamed from Bickenhill to Bickenhill and Marston Green in 2014.

Bickenhill ward elects three councillors to the metropolitan borough council. Solihull Metropolitan Borough Council maintain a waste recycling centre in the parish. Historically, the parish was in the Meriden Rural District of Warwickshire from 1894 until 1974, when it became part of the Metropolitan Borough of Solihull and the newly created West Midlands county.

== Geography ==
Bickenhill and Marston Green parish covers the villages of both Bickenhill and Marston Green. Also in the parish are Birmingham Airport, the National Exhibition Centre, and the National Motorcycle Museum.

The parish is crossed by two major roads: the M42 motorway and the A45. The A45 is referred to locally as the Coventry Road. The village of Bickenhill is south of the A45 road (whereas the rest of the parish is north of the A45). Junction 6 of the M42 is known as the Bickenhill Interchange.

Nearby villages include Catherine-de-Barnes, Hampton in Arden and Meriden.

== Demographics ==
In the 2011 census the parish population was 7,153, an increase from the 2001 Census figure of 6,583.

Census population of Bickenhill and Marston Green parish
| Census | Population | Female | Male | Households | Source |
|---|---|---|---|---|---|
| 2001 | 6,583 | 3,369 | 3,214 | 2,542 | |
| 2011 | 7,153 | 3,662 | 3,491 | 2,835 | |
| 2021 | 7,438 | 3,770 | 3,668 | 2,997 | |

== Landmarks ==
The Church of England parish church of Saint Peter is Norman and was built in 1140; it is grade I listed. The majority of the older houses in Bickenhill village are Georgian or Victorian.

The centre of the village is a conservation area, and in a response to the Planning Inspectorate in 2019 Solihull Council described its value as "high" and said that it "has a focal building in the grade I listed mediaeval parish church on locally high ground at the heart of a group of historic and other buildings typifying an English midlands village. This includes the grade II listed Grange Farm and several buildings on the local list of heritage assets, served by narrow sinuous lanes with enclosing banks and hedgerows, beyond which are many surviving fields and paddocks often representing an historic layout".

== Sport ==
Páirc na hÉireann, off Catherine de Barnes Lane, is the primary venue for Gaelic games in the West Midlands. It has three full-size Gaelic Athletic Association pitches with eight changing rooms, bar area and car-parking.
