= Lyndon, Solihull =

Coordinates: 52.449°N 1.792°W

Lyndon is a district within the Metropolitan Borough of Solihull in the English county of the West Midlands. The population of the Lyndon Ward at the 2011 census was 13,574. It was the home of the Lyndon family. The home (Lyndon Manor) is long gone but became Olton Jubilee Park on Lyndon Rd. It was born in Acocks Green and named after the family home and the park. There is a local historical society with some knowledge of the family before they built the Manor. The ancient monument of Hob's Moat is nearby, as is Hatchford Brook.

The place name "Lyndon" is Anglo-Saxon in origin and refers to a hill bearing a lime tree. The area is not now generally called Lyndon, but amenities such as schools and pubs have Lyndon in their title.

Lyndon Ward elects its representatives on to Solihull Council three in every four years.
