= Smith's Wood =

Coordinates: 52.500°N 1.747°W

- Town
- Location within the West Midlands
- Population: 10,479 (2011)
- Civil parish: Smith's Wood
- Metropolitan borough: Solihull
- Metropolitan county: West Midlands
- Region: West Midlands
- Country: England
- Sovereign state: United Kingdom
- Post town: BIRMINGHAM
- Postcode district: B36
- Dialling code: 0121
- Police: West Midlands
- Fire: West Midlands
- Ambulance: West Midlands
- UK Parliament: Birmingham Hodge Hill and Solihull North

Smith's Wood is a suburban civil parish in the Metropolitan Borough of Solihull in the West Midlands of England. It is known best for its schools and ancient woodland. The civil parish has a population of 10,476, according to the 2011 census. North Warwickshire forms its north and east boundary, Kingshurst its south, and Castle Bromwich its west. Smith's Wood also has several parks including Lanchester Park, Woodlands Green Park, and the Smith's Wood Playing Fields. Historically, the area was in Warwickshire.

== History ==
Smith's Wood is the site of the ancient 'Smith's Wood' – an ancient woodland which was once part of the forest of Arden. The woodland was officially designated a Local Nature Reserve in 2004. Burtons Farm once stood on the junction of Burtons Way and Windward Way and was part of the estates of Coleshill Manor and Kingshurst Hall in Warwickshire. Bosworth Wood Farm was located on Auckland Drive. Smith's Wood Boys Football Club, was established in 1970. Nottingham Forest forward Jamie Ward is from Smith's Wood and attended Smith's Wood Sports College.

Arran Way Shopping Centre that once stood on Arran Way is now the site of privately owned homes constructed by Bellway Homes as part of the regeneration. The old site contained various shops, a post office, a pet shop and the offices for Solihull Community Housing.

== Regeneration of Smith's Wood ==
As part of a £1.4 billion project, many flats and houses (mostly built in the 1960s and 1970s) have been demolished and rebuilt in Smith's Wood as part of the regeneration project of North Solihull. New features have included a brand new high street with a state of the art medical centre, post office, library, a community hub, and a new private housing estate on Burton's Farm Park. The Woodlands campus of Solihull College was completed in 2006. In 2024 one of Solihull's makeshift 'Family Hubs' opened, offering refuge and support for families and children.

Smith's Wood Primary Academy was completed in 2009 and was at that time one of the largest primary schools in the country. It replaced the former Kingfisher Primary School that once stood on its current sports field. Pupils from nearby Bosworth Wood Primary School were merged with the school to occupy the new building.

== Cars Area ==
The 'CARS Area', also known as the 'CARS Estate', is a red brick housing estate in the north of the parish consisting mostly of red brick terrace housing built mostly in the late 1970s as an overspill of the existing 'Chelmsley Wood North' estate. The area is distinct for its cosy atmosphere as the majority of its properties are inward facing with the front doors facing greens, gulleys and pavements. Lanchester Park and further woodland can be found here.

== Education ==
There are two primary schools in Smith's Wood. Smith's Wood Primary Academy (formerly 'Smith's Wood Community Primary School') on Burtons Way, and St John the Baptist Roman Catholic Primary School on Arran Way.

Smith's Wood Academy (formerly and popularly known as 'Smith's Wood Sports College') is the main senior school attended by Smith's Wood children, though some also attend other schools in the wider North Solihull area. The school is known for its swimming pool, rock climbing wall, fitness centre and other sports facilities, often used by the community.

Smith's Wood has four Special Education Needs (SEND) schools, including those for Social, Emotional and Mental Health difficulties (SEMH), for pupils aged 3-18. Forest Oak School and Merstone School share a building on shared grounds with Smith's Wood Academy on Windward Way. Castlewood School catering for children with SEMH on Jensen Avenue, and The Heights school on Auckland Drive, exclusively built for pupils in years 3-7.

== Ethnicity ==
At the 2001 Census, Smith’s Wood had the 6th highest proportion of non-white residents (Black, Asian, Mixed Race and Chinese) in Solihull (6%), although all wards in the Borough are below the West Midlands average of 11%. In 2001, Smith’s Wood had the Borough’s highest proportion of mixed race (3%) and black residents (3%).

== Democracy ==
Smith's Wood ward is one of 17 wards within Solihull Borough Council. The ward had traditionally been represented by the Green Party since 2008 and won every year since 2011. However, in the 2026 Local elections, Reform UK gained all three seats from the Green Party.

== Notable residents ==
Footballer Kaine Kesler-Hayden was born and raised in Smith’s Wood.

Barry Austin lived in Smith's Wood before his untimely death in 2021.
