= 1990 United Kingdom local elections =

- 3 May 1990

All 32 London boroughs, all 36 metropolitan boroughs, 116 out of 296 English districts and all 12 Scottish regions
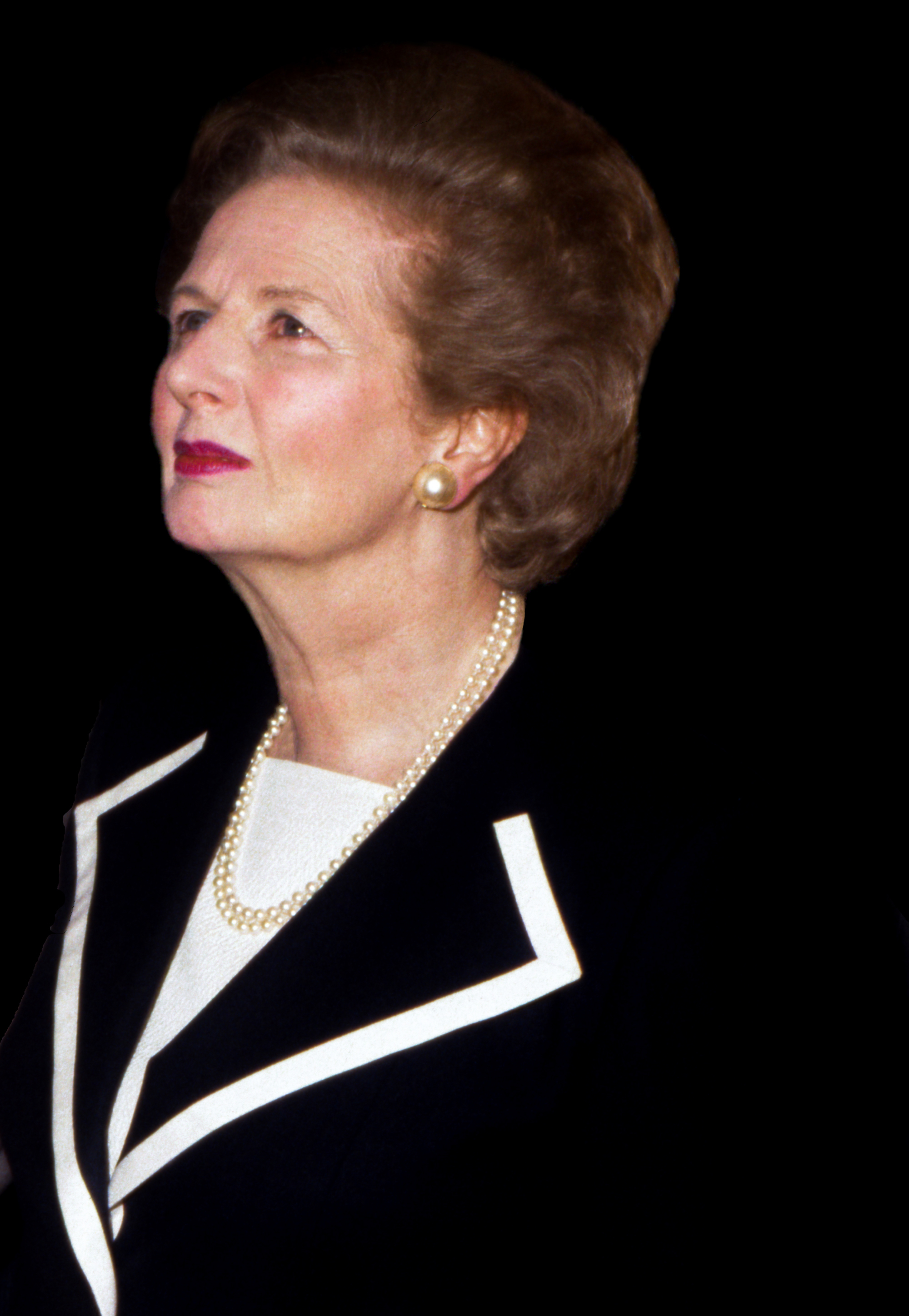

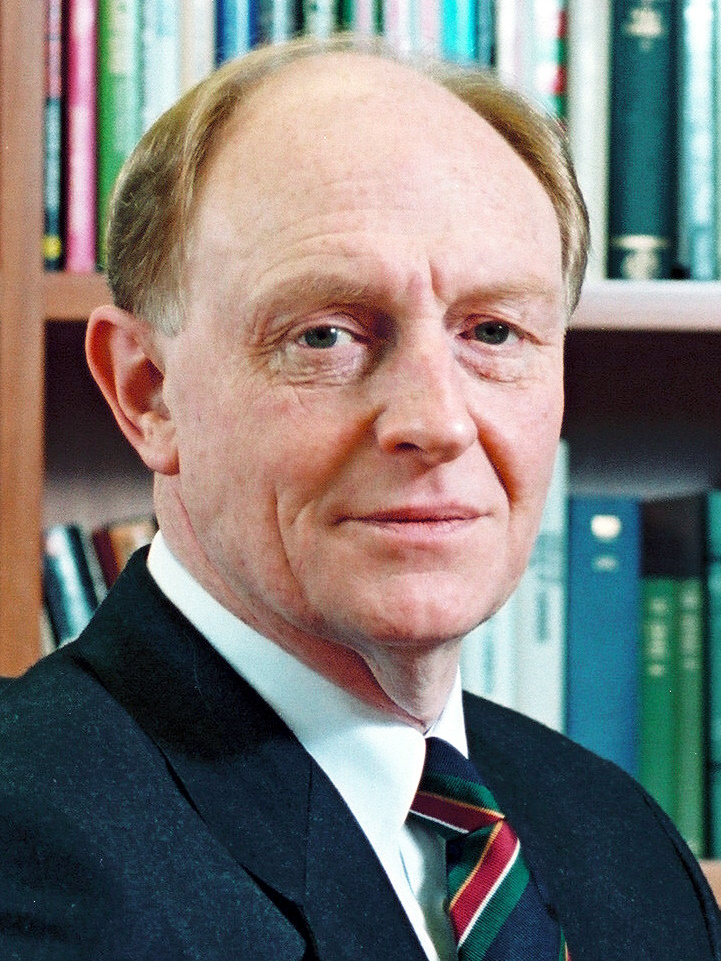

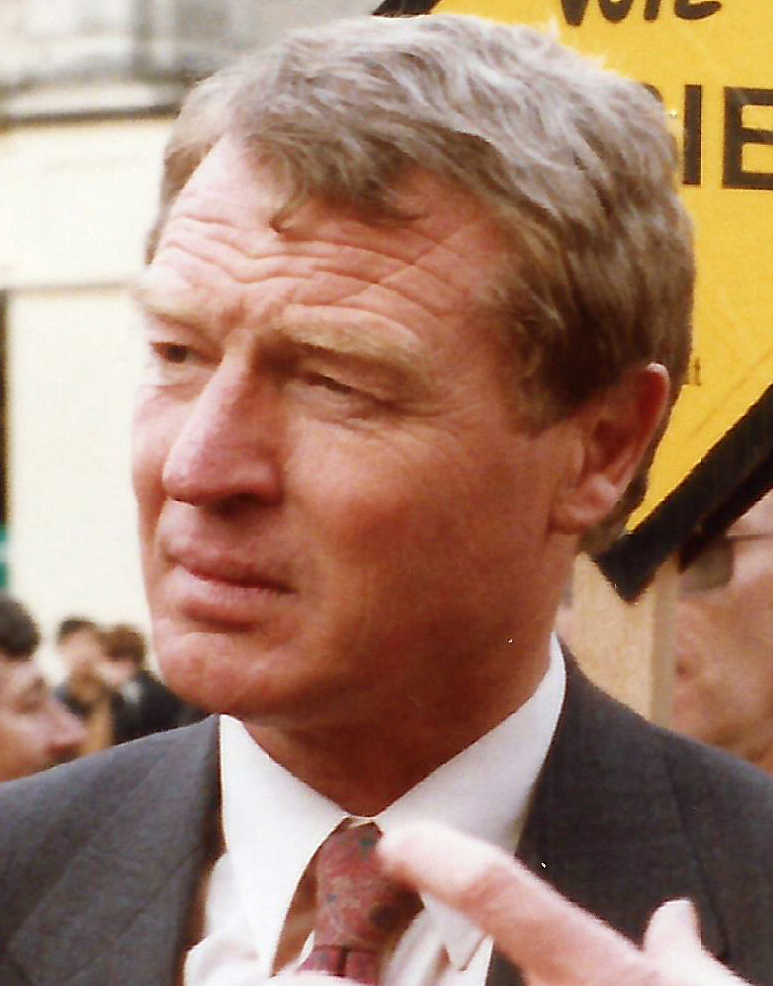
	Majority party	Minority party	Third party
Leader	Margaret Thatcher	Neil Kinnock	Paddy Ashdown
Party	Conservative	Labour	Liberal Democrats
Leader since	11 February 1975	2 October 1983	16 July 1988
Percentage	33%	44%	17%
Councillors	9,020	8,920	3,265
Councillors +/-	▼222	▲284	▼78

The 1990 United Kingdom local elections were held on Thursday 3 May 1990. They were the last local elections held before the resignation of Prime Minister Margaret Thatcher in November 1990.

The main opposition Labour Party gained 284 seats, bringing their number of councillors to 8,920, their highest since 1981. Their projected share of the vote was 44%, an increase of 2% from 1989.

The governing Conservative Party lost 222 seats, leaving them with 9,020 councillors. Their share of the vote was projected to be 33%, a fall of 3% from the previous year. This mounted further pressure on the government of Margaret Thatcher, which had been declining for a year following the introduction of the controversial poll tax, and was a major boost for opposition leader Neil Kinnock, whose Labour Party was enjoying a wide lead in the opinion polls with a general election no more than two years away.

The Liberal Democrats lost 78 seats and had 3,265 councillors after the elections. Their projected share of the vote was 17%.

== England ==
=== London boroughs ===
In all 32 London boroughs the whole council was up for election.

Council	Previous control	Result	Details
Barking and Dagenham	Labour	Labour hold	Details
Barnet	Conservative	Conservative hold	Details
Bexley	Conservative	Conservative hold	Details
Brent	Labour	No overall control gain	Details
Bromley	Conservative	Conservative hold	Details
Camden	Labour	Labour hold	Details
Croydon	Conservative	Conservative hold	Details
Ealing	Labour	Conservative gain	Details
Enfield	Conservative	Conservative hold	Details
Greenwich	Labour	Labour hold	Details
Hackney	Labour	Labour hold	Details
Hammersmith and Fulham	Labour	Labour hold	Details
Haringey	Labour	Labour hold	Details
Harrow	Conservative	Conservative hold	Details
Havering	No overall control	No overall control hold	Details
Hillingdon	No overall control	Conservative gain	Details
Hounslow	Labour	Labour hold	Details
Islington	Labour	Labour hold	Details
Kensington and Chelsea	Conservative	Conservative hold	Details
Kingston upon Thames	No overall control	No overall control hold	Details
Lambeth	Labour	Labour hold	Details
Lewisham	Labour	Labour hold	Details
Merton	Conservative	Labour gain	Details
Newham	Labour	Labour hold	Details
Redbridge	Conservative	Conservative hold	Details
Richmond upon Thames	Liberal Democrats	Liberal Democrats hold	Details
Southwark	Labour	Labour hold	Details
Sutton	Liberal Democrats	Liberal Democrats hold	Details
Tower Hamlets	Liberal Democrats	Liberal Democrats hold	Details
Waltham Forest	Labour	Labour hold	Details
Wandsworth	Conservative	Conservative hold	Details
Westminster	Conservative	Conservative hold	Details

=== Metropolitan boroughs ===
All 36 metropolitan borough councils had one third of their seats up for election.

Council	Previous control	Result	Details
Barnsley	Labour	Labour hold	Details
Birmingham	Labour	Labour hold	Details
Bolton	Labour	Labour hold	Details
Bradford	No overall control	Labour gain	Details
Bury	Labour	Labour hold	Details
Calderdale	No overall control	Labour gain	Details
Coventry	Labour	Labour hold	Details
Doncaster	Labour	Labour hold	Details
Dudley	Labour	Labour hold	Details
Gateshead	Labour	Labour hold	Details
Kirklees	No overall control	Labour gain	Details
Knowsley	Labour	Labour hold	Details
Leeds	Labour	Labour hold	Details
Liverpool	Labour	Labour hold	Details
Manchester	Labour	Labour hold	Details
Newcastle upon Tyne	Labour	Labour hold	Details
North Tyneside	Labour	Labour hold	Details
Oldham	Labour	Labour hold	Details
Rochdale	Labour	Labour hold	Details
Rotherham	Labour	Labour hold	Details
Salford	Labour	Labour hold	Details
Sandwell	Labour	Labour hold	Details
Sefton	No overall control	No overall control hold	Details
Sheffield	Labour	Labour hold	Details
Solihull	Conservative	Conservative hold	Details
South Tyneside	Labour	Labour hold	Details
St Helens	Labour	Labour hold	Details
Stockport	No overall control	No overall control hold	Details
Sunderland	Labour	Labour hold	Details
Tameside	Labour	Labour hold	Details
Trafford	Conservative	Conservative hold	Details
Wakefield	Labour	Labour hold	Details
Walsall	Labour	Labour hold	Details
Wigan	Labour	Labour hold	Details
Wirral	No overall control	No overall control hold	Details
Wolverhampton	Labour	Labour hold	Details

=== District councils ===
==== Whole council ====
In 2 districts the whole council was up for election as there were new ward boundaries, following further electoral boundary reviews by the Local Government Boundary Commission for England.

Council	Previous control	Result	Details
Colchester	No overall control	No overall control hold	Details
Preston	Labour	Labour hold	Details

==== Third of council ====
In 114 districts one third of the council was up for election.

Council	Previous control	Result	Details
Adur	Liberal Democrats	Liberal Democrats hold	Details
Amber Valley	Conservative	Conservative hold	Details
Barrow-in-Furness	Labour	Labour hold	Details
Basildon	No overall control	Labour gain	Details
Basingstoke and Deane	Conservative	Conservative hold	Details
Bassetlaw	Labour	Labour hold	Details
Bath	Conservative	No overall control gain	Details
Blackburn	Labour	Labour hold	Details
Brentwood	Conservative	No overall control gain	Details
Brighton	Labour	Labour hold	Details
Bristol	Labour	Labour hold	Details
Broadland	Conservative	Conservative hold	Details
Broxbourne	Conservative	Conservative hold	Details
Burnley	Labour	Labour hold	Details
Cambridge	Labour	Labour hold	Details
Cannock Chase	Labour	Labour hold	Details
Carlisle	Labour	Labour hold	Details
Cheltenham	No overall control	No overall control hold	Details
Cherwell	Conservative	Conservative hold	Details
Chester	No overall control	No overall control hold	Details
Chorley	No overall control	Labour gain	Details
Congleton	No overall control	No overall control hold	Details
Craven	No overall control	No overall control hold	Details
Crawley	Labour	Labour hold	Details
Crewe and Nantwich	No overall control	Labour gain	Details
Daventry	Conservative	Conservative hold	Details
Derby	Conservative	Conservative hold	Details
Eastbourne	Conservative	No overall control gain	Details
Eastleigh	Liberal Democrats	No overall control gain	Details
Ellesmere Port and Neston	Labour	Labour hold	Details
Elmbridge	Conservative	Conservative hold	Details
Epping Forest	Conservative	Conservative hold	Details
Exeter	No overall control	No overall control hold	Details
Fareham	Conservative	Conservative hold	Details
Gillingham	Conservative	No overall control gain	Details
Gloucester	Conservative	No overall control gain	Details
Gosport	Conservative	No overall control gain	Details
Great Grimsby	Labour	Labour hold	Details
Great Yarmouth	No overall control	Labour gain	Details
Halton	Labour	Labour hold	Details
Harlow	Labour	Labour hold	Details
Harrogate	Conservative	No overall control gain	Details
Hart	No overall control	No overall control hold	Details
Hartlepool	Labour	Labour hold	Details
Hastings	No overall control	No overall control hold	Details
Havant	Conservative	No overall control gain	Details
Hereford	Liberal Democrats	Liberal Democrats hold	Details
Hertsmere	Conservative	Conservative hold	Details
Huntingdonshire	Conservative	Conservative hold	Details
Hyndburn	Labour	Labour hold	Details
Ipswich	Labour	Labour hold	Details
Kingston upon Hull	Labour	Labour hold	Details
Leominster	Independent	Independent hold	Details
Lincoln	Labour	Labour hold	Details
Macclesfield	Conservative	Conservative hold	Details
Maidstone	No overall control	No overall control hold	Details
Milton Keynes	No overall control	No overall control hold	Details
Mole Valley	No overall control	No overall control hold	Details
Newcastle-under-Lyme	Labour	Labour hold	Details
North Bedfordshire	No overall control	No overall control hold	Details
North Hertfordshire	Conservative	Conservative hold	Details
Norwich	Labour	Labour hold	Details
Nuneaton and Bedworth	Labour	Labour hold	Details
Oadby and Wigston	Conservative	Conservative hold	Details
Oxford	Labour	Labour hold	Details
Pendle	Liberal Democrats	No overall control gain	Details
Penwith	No overall control	No overall control hold	Details
Peterborough	No overall control	No overall control hold	Details
Portsmouth	Conservative	No overall control gain	Details
Purbeck	No overall control	No overall control hold	Details
Reading	Labour	Labour hold	Details
Redditch	Labour	Labour hold	Details
Reigate and Banstead	Conservative	Conservative hold	Details
Rochford	Conservative	No overall control gain	Details
Rossendale	Labour	Labour hold	Details
Rugby	Conservative	No overall control gain	Details
Runnymede	Conservative	Conservative hold	Details
Rushmoor	Conservative	Conservative hold	Details
Scunthorpe	Labour	Labour hold	Details
Shrewsbury and Atcham	No overall control	No overall control hold	Details
Slough	Labour	Labour hold	Details
South Bedfordshire	Conservative	Conservative hold	Details
South Cambridgeshire	Independent	Independent hold	Details
South Herefordshire	Independent	Independent hold	Details
South Lakeland	No overall control	No overall control hold	Details
Southampton	Labour	Labour hold	Details
Southend-on-Sea	No overall control	Conservative gain	Details
St Albans	Conservative	Conservative hold	Details
Stevenage	Labour	Labour hold	Details
Stoke-on-Trent	Labour	Labour hold	Details
Stratford-on-Avon	Conservative	Conservative hold	Details
Stroud	No overall control	No overall control hold	Details
Swale	No overall control	No overall control hold	Details
Tamworth	No overall control	Labour gain	Details
Tandridge	Conservative	No overall control gain	Details
Thamesdown	Labour	Labour hold	Details
Three Rivers	Liberal Democrats	No overall control gain	Details
Thurrock	Labour	Labour hold	Details
Torbay	Conservative	No overall control gain	Details
Tunbridge Wells	Conservative	Conservative hold	Details
Watford	No overall control	Labour gain	Details
Waveney	No overall control	Labour gain	Details
Welwyn Hatfield	Labour	Labour hold	Details
West Lancashire	Conservative	Conservative hold	Details
West Lindsey	No overall control	No overall control hold	Details
West Oxfordshire	Conservative	Independent gain	Details
Weymouth and Portland	No overall control	No overall control hold	Details
Winchester	No overall control	No overall control hold	Details
Woking	No overall control	No overall control hold	Details
Wokingham	Conservative	Conservative hold	Details
Worcester	Labour	Labour hold	Details
Worthing	Conservative	Conservative hold	Details
Wyre Forest	No overall control	No overall control hold	Details
York	Labour	Labour hold	Details

== Scotland ==
=== Regional councils ===
Council	Previous control	Result	Details
Borders	Independent	Independent hold	Details
Central	Labour	Labour hold	Details
Dumfries and Galloway	Independent	Independent hold	Details
Fife	Labour	Labour hold	Details
Grampian	No overall control	No overall control hold	Details
Highland	Independent	Independent hold	Details
Lothian	Labour	Labour hold	Details
Orkney	Independent	Independent hold	Details
Shetland	Independent	Independent hold	Details
Strathclyde	Labour	Labour hold	Details
Tayside	No overall control	No overall control hold	Details
Western Isles	Independent	Independent hold	Details
