= Miriam Harris =

Miriam Harris may refer to:

- Miriam Coles Harris (1834–1925), American novelist
- Miriam Goldberg (1916–2017 as Harris), American newspaper publisher
- Miriam Duchess Harris, African American academic, author, and legal scholar
- Miriam Harris, British politician, candidate in Solihull Metropolitan Borough Council election, 1986 and Solihull Metropolitan Borough Council election, 1988
- Miriam Harris Murray JP of Dunedin in 1995 Birthday Honours
- Miriam Harris, experimental film maker in 2009 Brooklyn Film Festival and contributor to 2016 comics anthology Three Words
- Miriam Harris, character in 2013 American comedy film Last Vegas
