= 1990 Colchester Borough Council election =

1990 English local government election

- 3 May 1990

All 60 seats to Colchester Borough Council 31 seats needed for a majority
- Registered: 112,017
- Turnout: 45.4% (▲5.1%)
| | First party | Second party | Third party |
|---|---|---|---|
| Party | Liberal Democrats | Conservative | Labour |
| Last election | 24 seats, 32.5% | 23 seats, 39.7% | 9 seats, 25.1% |
| Seats won | 28 | 17 | 12 |
| Seat change | ▲4 | ▼6 | ▲3 |
| Popular vote | 46,791 | 39,858 | 38,555 |
| Percentage | 35.6% | 30.3% | 29.3% |
| Swing | ▲3.1% | ▼9.4% | ▲4.2% |
| | Fourth party | Fifth party |
| Party | Residents | Independent |
| Last election | 3 seats, 2.7% | 1 seat, 0.0% |
| Seats won | 3 | 0 |
| Seat change | Steady | ▼1 |
| Popular vote | 3,170 | 923 |
| Percentage | 2.4% | 0.7% |
| Swing | ▼0.3% | N/A |
- Winner of each seat at the 1990 Colchester Borough Council election.
Council control before election
No overall control
Council control after election
No overall control

The 1990 Colchester Borough Council election took place on 3 May 1990 to elect members of Colchester Borough Council in Essex, England. This was on the same day as other local elections. The whole council was up for election on new ward boundaries.

== Summary ==
=== Election result ===
1990 Colchester Borough Council election
| Party | This election | | | | Full council | | | This election | | |
| Party | Candidates | Seats | Net | Seats % | Other | Total | Total % | Votes | Votes % | +/− |
|---|---|---|---|---|---|---|---|---|---|---|
| Liberal Democrats | 45 | 28 | ▲4 | 46.7 | 0 | 28 | 46.7 | 46,791 | 35.6 | +3.1 |
| Conservative | 50 | 17 | ▼6 | 28.3 | 0 | 17 | 28.3 | 39,858 | 30.3 | –9.4 |
| Labour | 50 | 12 | ▲3 | 20.0 | 0 | 12 | 20.0 | 38,555 | 29.3 | +4.2 |
| Residents | 3 | 3 | Steady | 5.0 | 0 | 3 | 5.0 | 3,170 | 2.4 | –0.3 |
| Green | 3 | 0 | Steady | 0.0 | 0 | 0 | 0.0 | 1,438 | 1.1 | N/A |
| Independent | 2 | 0 | ▼1 | 0.0 | 0 | 0 | 0.0 | 923 | 0.7 | N/A |
| SDP | 2 | 0 | Steady | 0.0 | 0 | 0 | 0.0 | 640 | 0.5 | N/A |

== Ward results ==
=== Berechurch ===
Berechurch
| Party | Candidate | Votes | % |
|---|---|---|---|
| Liberal Democrats | H. Davis* | 1,545 | 52.0 |
| Liberal Democrats | J. Stevens* | 1,465 | 49.3 |
| Liberal Democrats | Terry Sutton | 1,340 | 45.1 |
| Labour | R. McQuilty | 1,210 | 40.7 |
| Labour | Dave Harris | 1,069 | 35.9 |
| Labour | Don Quinn | 1,016 | 34.2 |
| Conservative | J. Parsons | 451 | 15.2 |
| Conservative | S. Wilson | 429 | 14.4 |
| Conservative | N. Peckston | 398 | 13.4 |
| Turnout | | 2,974 | 51.3 |
| Registered electors | | 5,797 | |
| Liberal Democrats hold | | | |
| Liberal Democrats hold | | | |
| Liberal Democrats hold | | | |

=== Birch Messing Copford ===
Birch Messing Copford
| Party | Candidate | Votes | % |
|---|---|---|---|
| Conservative | P. Crowe | 619 | 51.0 |
| Labour | C. Shreeve | 297 | 26.3 |
| Liberal Democrats | K. Nelson | 257 | 22.7 |
| Majority | | 354 | 24.7 |
| Turnout | | 1,173 | 48.5 |
| Registered electors | | 2,333 | |
| Conservative win (new seat) | | | |

=== Boxted & Langham ===
Boxted & Langham
| Party | Candidate | Votes | % | ±% |
|---|---|---|---|---|
| Conservative | J. Garrett* | 619 | 59.9 | −3.1 |
| Liberal Democrats | W. Chivers | 273 | 26.4 | −1.0 |
| Labour | F. Richards | 142 | 13.7 | +4.1 |
| Majority | | 346 | 33.5 | −2.1 |
| Turnout | | 1,034 | 55.1 | +4.8 |
| Registered electors | | 1,876 | | |
| Conservative hold | | Swing | ▼1.1 | |

=== Castle ===
Castle
| Party | Candidate | Votes | % |
|---|---|---|---|
| Liberal Democrats | Chris Hall* | 1,239 | 46.4 |
| Labour | Ken Cooke* | 1,154 | 43.2 |
| Liberal Democrats | J. Carter | 1,020 | 38.2 |
| Liberal Democrats | K. Merriweather | 969 | 36.3 |
| Labour | J. Cant | 790 | 29.6 |
| Conservative | E. Humphreys | 698 | 26.1 |
| Labour | R. Turp | 663 | 24.8 |
| Conservative | G. Haig-Thomas | 581 | 21.8 |
| Conservative | M. Snaith | 568 | 21.3 |
| Green | T. Manley | 333 | 12.5 |
| Turnout | | 2,671 | 51.5 |
| Registered electors | | 5,186 | |
| Liberal Democrats hold | | | |
| Labour hold | | | |
| Liberal Democrats hold | | | |

=== Dedham ===
Dedham
| Party | Candidate | Votes | % | ±% |
|---|---|---|---|---|
| Liberal Democrats | G. Williams* | 565 | 57.5 | +3.6 |
| Conservative | N. Everett | 364 | 37.0 | −6.4 |
| Labour | G. Newman | 54 | 5.5 | +2.8 |
| Majority | | 201 | 20.5 | |
| Turnout | | 983 | 61.3 | |
| Registered electors | | 1,559 | | |
| Liberal Democrats hold | | Swing | ▲5.0 | |

=== East Donyland ===
East Donyland
| Party | Candidate | Votes | % | ±% |
|---|---|---|---|---|
| Labour | B. Wilding | 364 | 40.3 | +9.1 |
| Conservative | J. Sanderson* | 317 | 35.1 | −21.8 |
| Liberal Democrats | Barry Woodward | 222 | 24.6 | +12.7 |
| Majority | | 47 | 5.2 | N/A |
| Turnout | | 903 | 53.3 | −2.8 |
| Registered electors | | 1,695 | | |
| Labour gain from Conservative | | Swing | ▲15.5 | |

=== Fordham ===
Fordham
| Party | Candidate | Votes | % | ±% |
|---|---|---|---|---|
| Conservative | David Cannon* | 440 | 55.5 | −10.6 |
| Labour | R. Lee | 220 | 27.7 | +9.0 |
| Liberal Democrats | M. Thomas | 133 | 16.8 | +1.6 |
| Majority | | 220 | 27.8 | −19.6 |
| Turnout | | 793 | 55.6 | +7.3 |
| Registered electors | | 1,425 | | |
| Conservative hold | | Swing | ▼9.8 | |

=== Great & Little Horkesley ===
Great & Little Horkesley
| Party | Candidate | Votes | % | ±% |
|---|---|---|---|---|
| Conservative | E. Paice | 500 | 55.1 | −4.4 |
| Labour | Lucy Wood | 257 | 28.3 | +14.9 |
| Liberal Democrats | H. Chamberlain | 151 | 16.6 | −10.5 |
| Majority | | 243 | 26.8 | −5.5 |
| Turnout | | 908 | 51.6 | +1.3 |
| Registered electors | | 1,760 | | |
| Conservative hold | | Swing | ▼9.7 | |

=== Great Tey ===
Great Tey
| Party | Candidate | Votes | % | ±% |
|---|---|---|---|---|
| Liberal Democrats | J. Brice | 531 | 54.3 | +36.8 |
| Conservative | I. Stratford | 352 | 36.0 | −24.4 |
| Labour | P. Doncaster | 95 | 9.7 | +1.8 |
| Majority | | 179 | 18.3 | N/A |
| Turnout | | 978 | 56.4 | +3.1 |
| Registered electors | | 1,734 | | |
| Liberal Democrats gain from Conservative | | Swing | ▲30.6 | |

=== Harbour ===
Harbour
| Party | Candidate | Votes | % |
|---|---|---|---|
| Labour | J. Bird* | 1,292 | 55.9 |
| Liberal Democrats | E. Fowler* | 1,198 | 51.9 |
| Labour | Rod Green* | 1,183 | 51.2 |
| Labour | S. Manning-Press | 936 | 40.5 |
| Liberal Democrats | Patricia Blandon | 881 | 38.1 |
| Liberal Democrats | J. Gilfillan | 787 | 34.1 |
| Conservative | Mike Coyne | 490 | 21.2 |
| Anti Poll Tax | D. Smith | 160 | 6.9 |
| Turnout | | 2,310 | 42.5 |
| Registered electors | | 5,435 | |
| Labour hold | | | |
| Liberal Democrats hold | | | |
| Labour hold | | | |

=== Lexden ===
Lexden
| Party | Candidate | Votes | % |
|---|---|---|---|
| Liberal Democrats | Ian Trusler* | 1,452 | 58.7 |
| Liberal Democrats | W. Sandford* | 1,290 | 52.1 |
| Liberal Democrats | Barbara Williamson | 1,208 | 48.8 |
| Conservative | Sonia Lewis* | 1,054 | 42.6 |
| Conservative | P. Crafford | 1,015 | 41.0 |
| Conservative | Christopher Manning-Press | 933 | 37.7 |
| Labour | J. Crawford | 245 | 9.9 |
| Labour | D. Francis | 225 | 9.1 |
| Turnout | | 2,474 | 56.4 |
| Registered electors | | 4,386 | |
| Liberal Democrats hold | | | |
| Liberal Democrats hold | | | |
| Liberal Democrats gain from Conservative | | | |

=== Marks Tey ===
Marks Tey
| Party | Candidate | Votes | % | ±% |
|---|---|---|---|---|
| Conservative | Richard Gower* | 443 | 42.0 | −7.2 |
| Liberal Democrats | G. Ambridge | 313 | 29.7 | +4.8 |
| Labour | G. Taylor | 299 | 28.3 | +7.7 |
| Majority | | 130 | 12.3 | −8.1 |
| Turnout | | 1,055 | 51.4 | +7.6 |
| Registered electors | | 2,501 | | |
| Conservative hold | | Swing | ▼6.0 | |

=== Mile End ===
Mile End
| Party | Candidate | Votes | % |
|---|---|---|---|
| Conservative | J. Fulford* | 1,361 | 51.6 |
| Conservative | P. Borges* | 1,353 | 51.3 |
| Conservative | D. Fulford* | 1,336 | 50.6 |
| Labour | M. Snowling | 1,026 | 38.9 |
| Liberal Democrats | B. Trusler | 986 | 37.3 |
| Labour | Sandra Benedetti | 951 | 36.0 |
| Labour | A. Harley | 911 | 34.5 |
| Turnout | | 2,640 | 41.0 |
| Registered electors | | 6,440 | |
| Conservative hold | | | |
| Conservative hold | | | |
| Conservative hold | | | |

=== New Town ===
New Town
| Party | Candidate | Votes | % |
|---|---|---|---|
| Liberal Democrats | Bob Russell* | 1,605 | 64.5 |
| Liberal Democrats | J. Stevens | 1,479 | 59.4 |
| Liberal Democrats | S. Haylock | 1,396 | 56.1 |
| Labour | A. Clavane | 842 | 33.8 |
| Labour | Dave Speed | 833 | 33.5 |
| Labour | S. McBride-Dick | 817 | 32.8 |
| Conservative | J. Clarke | 296 | 11.9 |
| SDP | J. Parrick | 209 | 8.4 |
| Turnout | | 2,490 | 47.7 |
| Registered electors | | 5,220 | |
| Liberal Democrats hold | | | |
| Liberal Democrats hold | | | |
| Liberal Democrats hold | | | |

=== Prettygate ===
Prettygate
| Party | Candidate | Votes | % |
|---|---|---|---|
| Liberal Democrats | David Goss | 1,823 | 59.5 |
| Liberal Democrats | Martin Hunt | 1,791 | 58.4 |
| Liberal Democrats | R. Yates | 1,707 | 55.7 |
| Conservative | H. Stutter | 1,096 | 35.8 |
| Conservative | W. Kimberley | 1,096 | 35.8 |
| Conservative | S. Rowley | 1,050 | 34.3 |
| Labour | T. Pearson | 632 | 20.6 |
| Turnout | | 3,065 | 52.2 |
| Registered electors | | 5,871 | |
| Liberal Democrats hold | | | |
| Liberal Democrats hold | | | |
| Liberal Democrats hold | | | |

=== Pyefleet ===
Pyefleet
| Party | Candidate | Votes | % | ±% |
|---|---|---|---|---|
| Conservative | J. Taber | 562 | 53.4 | −20.3 |
| Liberal Democrats | P. Treacher | 490 | 46.6 | +29.7 |
| Majority | | 72 | 6.8 | |
| Turnout | | 1,052 | 57.5 | |
| Registered electors | | 1,830 | | |
| Conservative hold | | Swing | ▼25.0 | |

=== Shrub End ===
Shrub End
| Party | Candidate | Votes | % |
|---|---|---|---|
| Liberal Democrats | G. Daldry* | 1,085 | 63.3 |
| Liberal Democrats | S. Cawley* | 1,043 | 60.9 |
| Liberal Democrats | K. Starling* | 964 | 56.3 |
| Labour | D. Bober | 607 | 35.4 |
| Labour | Frank Wilkin | 593 | 34.6 |
| Labour | R. Edwards | 480 | 28.0 |
| Conservative | A. Edwards | 360 | 21.0 |
| Turnout | | 1,713 | 30.4 |
| Registered electors | | 5,636 | |
| Liberal Democrats hold | | | |
| Liberal Democrats hold | | | |
| Liberal Democrats hold | | | |

=== St. Andrew's ===
St. Andrew's
| Party | Candidate | Votes | % |
|---|---|---|---|
| Labour | Graham Bober* | 1,417 | 77.3 |
| Labour | J. Baylis* | 1,285 | 70.1 |
| Labour | P. Truscott* | 1,213 | 66.2 |
| Liberal Democrats | P. Brady | 433 | 23.6 |
| Conservative | A. Pearson | 391 | 21.3 |
| Conservative | N. Taylor | 376 | 20.5 |
| Green | Mohammed Shabbeer | 374 | 20.4 |
| Turnout | | 1,833 | 30.2 |
| Registered electors | | 6,068 | |
| Labour hold | | | |
| Labour hold | | | |
| Labour hold | | | |

=== St. Anne's ===
St. Anne's
| Party | Candidate | Votes | % |
|---|---|---|---|
| Labour | Mary Frank* | 1,234 | 47.8 |
| Labour | K. Hindle | 1,182 | 45.8 |
| Liberal Democrats | Mike Hogg* | 1,164 | 45.1 |
| Liberal Democrats | E. Crudden* | 1,091 | 42.3 |
| Labour | Tim Young | 1,069 | 41.5 |
| Liberal Democrats | J. Fellows | 1,022 | 39.6 |
| Conservative | E. Hamilton | 500 | 19.4 |
| Conservative | N. Elcombe | 481 | 18.7 |
| Turnout | | 2,579 | 44.4 |
| Registered electors | | 5,808 | |
| Labour hold | | | |
| Labour gain from Liberal Democrats | | | |
| Liberal Democrats hold | | | |

=== St. John's ===
St. John's
| Party | Candidate | Votes | % |
|---|---|---|---|
| Liberal Democrats | John Baker* | 1,718 | 57.3 |
| Liberal Democrats | Ray Gamble | 1,562 | 52.1 |
| Liberal Democrats | P. Hiller | 1,502 | 50.1 |
| Conservative | J. Baldock | 1,152 | 38.4 |
| Conservative | D. McBean | 1,039 | 34.7 |
| Conservative | D. Mills | 1,020 | 34.0 |
| Labour | M. Scott | 548 | 18.3 |
| Labour | L. Shelley | 451 | 15.0 |
| Turnout | | 2,998 | 50.9 |
| Registered electors | | 5,889 | |
| Liberal Democrats hold | | | |
| Liberal Democrats hold | | | |
| Liberal Democrats gain from Conservative | | | |

=== St. Mary's ===
St. Mary's
| Party | Candidate | Votes | % |
|---|---|---|---|
| Conservative | R. Spendlove* | 1,052 | 49.4 |
| Conservative | Nigel Chapman* | 983 | 46.2 |
| Conservative | H. Pawsey | 953 | 44.8 |
| Labour | Pauline Cook | 871 | 40.9 |
| Labour | Maureen Lee | 763 | 35.9 |
| Labour | K. Taylor | 757 | 35.6 |
| Liberal Democrats | R. Hunt | 575 | 27.0 |
| SDP | M. Patrick | 431 | 20.3 |
| Turnout | | 2,128 | 42.5 |
| Registered electors | | 5,008 | |
| Conservative hold | | | |
| Conservative hold | | | |
| Conservative hold | | | |

=== Stanway ===
Stanway
| Party | Candidate | Votes | % |
|---|---|---|---|
| Liberal Democrats | J. Ellis* | 1,547 | 56.5 |
| Liberal Democrats | Colin Sykes* | 1,481 | 54.1 |
| Liberal Democrats | K. Davis | 1,355 | 49.5 |
| Conservative | J. Orpen-Smellie* | 858 | 31.4 |
| Conservative | A. McNeill | 814 | 29.8 |
| Conservative | E. Gawthrop | 806 | 29.5 |
| Labour | S. Broadhurst | 463 | 16.9 |
| Labour | E. Plowright | 444 | 16.2 |
| Labour | Julie Young | 438 | 16.0 |
| Turnout | | 2,736 | 49.6 |
| Registered electors | | 5,516 | |
| Liberal Democrats hold | | | |
| Liberal Democrats hold | | | |
| Liberal Democrats gain from Conservative | | | |

=== Tiptree ===
Tiptree
| Party | Candidate | Votes | % |
|---|---|---|---|
| Residents | E. Bird* | 1,197 | 52.5 |
| Residents | John Webb* | 1,023 | 44.9 |
| Residents | John Elliott* | 950 | 41.7 |
| Conservative | B. Martin | 895 | 39.3 |
| Independent | J. Olley | 763 | 33.5 |
| Labour | Mike Dale | 724 | 31.8 |
| Labour | A. Axtell | 653 | 28.6 |
| Labour | E. Garwood | 634 | 27.8 |
| Turnout | | 2,280 | 37.2 |
| Registered electors | | 6,130 | |
| Residents hold | | | |
| Residents hold | | | |
| Residents hold | | | |

=== West Bergholt & Eight Ash Green ===
West Bergholt & Eight Ash Green
| Party | Candidate | Votes | % |
|---|---|---|---|
| Liberal Democrats | S. Baldwin | 1,160 | 84.2 |
| Conservative | J. Lampon* | 840 | 61.0 |
| Conservative | J. Nicholls | 760 | 55.2 |
| Turnout | | 1,378 | 37.7 |
| Registered electors | | 3,656 | |
| Liberal Democrats win (new seat) | | | |
| Conservative win (new seat) | | | |

=== Winstree ===
Winstree
| Party | Candidate | Votes | % | ±% |
|---|---|---|---|---|
| Conservative | M. Fairhead* | 652 | 65.3 | +6.5 |
| Liberal Democrats | D. Sykes | 346 | 34.7 | +2.4 |
| Majority | | 306 | 30.6 | |
| Turnout | | 998 | 55.8 | |
| Registered electors | | 1,789 | | |
| Conservative hold | | Swing | ▲2.1 | |

=== West Mersea ===
West Mersea
| Party | Candidate | Votes | % |
|---|---|---|---|
| Conservative | Margaret Kimberley* | 1,593 | 81.7 |
| Conservative | J. Stewart | 1,516 | 77.7 |
| Conservative | John Bouckley | 1,499 | 76.9 |
| Liberal Democrats | N. License | 627 | 32.2 |
| Labour | E. Newman | 620 | 31.8 |
| Turnout | | 1,950 | 35.9 |
| Registered electors | | 5,431 | |
| Conservative hold | | | |
| Conservative hold | | | |
| Conservative hold | | | |

=== Wivenhoe ===
Wivenhoe
| Party | Candidate | Votes | % |
|---|---|---|---|
| Labour | R. Richardson | 1,627 | 59.4 |
| Labour | S. Sharp* | 1,545 | 56.4 |
| Labour | Robert Newman | 1,415 | 51.6 |
| Conservative | David Adams* | 980 | 35.8 |
| Conservative | C. Thompson | 977 | 35.6 |
| Conservative | M. Last* | 940 | 34.3 |
| Green | P. Harris | 731 | 26.7 |
| Turnout | | 2,741 | 45.4 |
| Registered electors | | 6,038 | |
| Labour gain from Conservative | | | |
| Labour hold | | | |
| Labour gain from Conservative | | | |
