= 1990 Rochford District Council election =

1990 English local election

- 3 May 1990

15 out of 40 seats to Rochford District Council 21 seats needed for a majority

	First party	Second party	Third party
Party	Conservative	SLD	Labour
Seats won	1	8	5
Seats after	16	15	7
Seat change	▼4	▲2	▲2
Popular vote	7,400	10,351	3,489
Percentage	32.7%	45.7%	15.4%
Swing	▼13.3%	▲10.7%	▼2.0%
	Fourth party	Fifth party
Party	Ratepayer	Independent
Seats won	1	0
Seats after	1	1
Seat change	▲1	▼1
Popular vote	847	468
Percentage	3.7%	2.1%
Swing	N/A	▲0.6%
Council control before election
No overall control
Council control after election
No overall control

The 1990 Rochford District Council election took place on 3 May 1990 to elect members of Rochford District Council in Essex, England. This was on the same day as other local elections.

== Summary ==
=== Election result ===
1990 Rochford District Council election
Party	This election			Full council			This election		
Party	Seats	Net	Seats %	Other	Total	Total %	Votes	Votes %	+/−
Conservative	1	▼4	6.7	15	16	40.0	7,400	32.7	–13.3
SLD	8	▲2	53.3	7	15	37.5	10,351	45.7	+10.7
Labour	5	▲2	33.3	2	7	17.5	3,489	15.4	–2.0
Ratepayer	1	▲1	6.7	0	1	2.5	847	3.7	N/A
Independent	0	▼1	0.0	1	1	2.5	468	2.1	+0.6
Green	0	Steady	0.0	0	0	0.0	99	0.4	N/A

== Ward results ==
Incumbent councillors standing for re-election are marked with an asterisk (*). Changes in seats do not take into account by-elections or defections.

=== Downhall ===
Downhall
Party	Candidate	Votes	%	±%
SLD	S. Lemon*	1,025	77.2	+3.5
Conservative	S. Fletcher	303	22.8	+2.1
Majority		722	54.4	+1.4
Turnout		1,328	49.8	+6.0
Registered electors		2,668		
SLD hold		Swing	▲0.7	

=== Grange & Rawreth ===
Grange & Rawreth
Party	Candidate	Votes	%	±%
SLD	S. Skinner*	1,345	67.8	+20.1
SLD	A. Stephens	1,244	62.7	+15.0
Conservative	P. Jackson	487	24.5	–9.8
Conservative	R. McCamley	461	23.2	–11.1
Labour	S. Andre	430	21.7	+3.8
Turnout		~1,985	45.4	+1.8
Registered electors		4,372		
SLD hold				
SLD hold				

=== Hawkwell East ===
Hawkwell East
Party	Candidate	Votes	%	±%
SLD	H. Glynn	1,444	59.5	+28.2
Conservative	J. Sheaf*	981	40.5	–13.7
Majority		463	19.1	N/A
Turnout		2,425	45.2	+10.0
Registered electors		5,360		
SLD gain from Conservative		Swing	▲21.1	

=== Hockley East ===
Hockley East
Party	Candidate	Votes	%	±%
Ratepayer	R. Vingoe	847	55.3	N/A
Conservative	K. Smith	405	26.4	–35.0
SLD	M. Pearson	182	11.9	–7.8
Green	P. Lucas	99	6.5	N/A
Majority		442	28.8	N/A
Turnout		1,533	47.9	+9.9
Registered electors		3,198		
Ratepayer gain from Conservative				

=== Hullbridge Riverside ===
Hullbridge Riverside
Party	Candidate	Votes	%	±%
Labour	D. Flack*	858	60.6	+16.6
Conservative	R. Brown	466	46.0	–16.6
Majority		392	21.2	N/A
Turnout		1,324	44.6	+10.1
Registered electors		3,176		
Labour hold		Swing	▲16.6	

=== Hullbridge South ===
Hullbridge South
Party	Candidate	Votes	%	±%
Labour	M. Stevenson	546	54.0	+9.0
Conservative	R. Brown*	466	46.0	–9.0
Majority		80	7.9	N/A
Turnout		1,012	42.1	+3.5
Registered electors		2,401		
Labour gain from Conservative		Swing	▲9.0	

=== Lodge ===
Lodge
Party	Candidate	Votes	%	±%
SLD	M. Handford*	1,614	70.1	+14.2
Conservative	J. Farrell	690	29.9	–7.9
Majority		924	40.1	+21.9
Turnout		2,304	48.9	
Registered electors		4,715		
SLD hold		Swing	▲11.1	

=== Rayleigh Central ===
Rayleigh Central
Party	Candidate	Votes	%	±%
SLD	J. Helson	541	38.2	–2.2
Independent	S. Silva*	468	33.0	N/A
Conservative	D. Geach	408	28.8	–6.0
Majority		73	5.2	–0.4
Turnout		1,417	48.4	+14.9
Registered electors		2,929		
SLD gain from Independent				

=== Rochford Eastwood ===
Rochford Eastwood
Party	Candidate	Votes	%	±%
Labour	V. Arnold	313	38.8	+6.4
SLD	T. Powell	270	33.5	+4.4
Conservative	B. Wilkins	224	27.8	–4.8
Majority		43	5.3	N/A
Turnout		807	57.0	+4.4
Registered electors		1,415		
Labour gain from Conservative		Swing	▲1.0	

=== Rochford Roche ===
Rochford Roche
Party	Candidate	Votes	%	±%
Labour	J. Christie	431	54.6	+1.1
Conservative	M. Shelley	359	45.4	+15.3
Majority		72	9.1	–14.2
Turnout		790	49.8	–0.5
Registered electors		1,587		
Labour hold		Swing	▼7.1	

=== Rochford St Andrews ===
Rochford St Andrews
Party	Candidate	Votes	%	±%
Labour	D. Weir*	687	61.6	+27.4
Conservative	A. Curtis	429	38.4	–5.3
Majority		258	23.1	N/A
Turnout		1,116	47.3	+0.9
Registered electors		2,357		
Labour hold		Swing	▲16.4	

=== Trinity ===
Trinity
Party	Candidate	Votes	%	±%
SLD	R. Boyd*	1,147	73.2	+16.5
Conservative	L. Argentieri	419	26.8	–10.8
Majority		728	46.5	+27.5
Turnout		1,566	52.8	+1.2
Registered electors		2,968		
SLD hold		Swing	▲13.7	

=== Wheatley ===
Wheatley
Party	Candidate	Votes	%	±%
Conservative	B. Lovett*	722	50.03	+0.6
SLD	S. Tellis	721	49.97	+6.4
Majority		1	0.1	–5.7
Turnout		1,443	58.4	+5.6
Registered electors		2,469		
Conservative hold		Swing	▼2.9	

=== Whitehouse ===
Whitehouse
Party	Candidate	Votes	%	±%
SLD	M. Hunnable*	818	50.4	+13.1
Conservative	P. Lewis	580	35.8	–8.3
Labour	C. Long	224	13.8	+5.9
Majority		238	14.7	N/A
Turnout		1,622	59.8	+2.9
Registered electors		2,712		
SLD hold		Swing	▲10.7	
