= 1991 Solihull Metropolitan Borough Council election =

1991 UK local government election

(1990 ←) 1991 United Kingdom local elections (→ 1992)

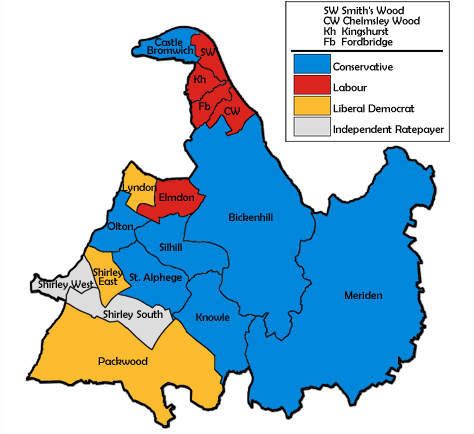
Map of the results for the 1991 Solihull council election.

The 1991 Solihull Metropolitan Borough Council elections were held on Thursday, 2 May 1991, with one third of the council as well as a double vacancy in St. Alphege to be elected. There had been a by-election in the interim, with the Independent Ratepayers & Residents gaining a seat in Shirley West from the Conservatives. The council fell to no overall control for the first time since its creation in 1973. Voter turnout was 46.0%.

== Election result ==
Solihull local election result 1991
| Party | Seats | Gains | Losses | Net gain/loss | Seats % | Votes % | Votes | +/− |
|---|---|---|---|---|---|---|---|---|
| Conservative | 8 | 0 | 3 | -3 | 44.4 | 46.2 | 32,989 | +4.9 |
| Labour | 5 | 1 | 0 | +1 | 27.8 | 23.0 | 16,415 | -8.9 |
| Liberal Democrats | 3 | 1 | 0 | +1 | 16.7 | 18.5 | 13,225 | +1.8 |
| Independent Ratepayers & Residents | 2 | 1 | 0 | +1 | 11.1 | 8.3 | 5,956 | +1.2 |
| Green | 0 | 0 | 0 | 0 | 0.0 | 3.6 | 2,542 | +0.7 |
| Independent Labour | 0 | 0 | 0 | 0 | 0.0 | 0.4 | 256 | +0.4 |

This result had the following consequences for the total number of seats on the council after the elections:

| Party | Previous council | New council |
|---|---|---|
| Conservatives | 26 | 23 |
| Labour | 15 | 16 |
| Independent Ratepayers & Residents | 5 | 6 |
| Liberal Democrats | 5 | 6 |
| Total | 51 | 51 |
| Working majority | 1 | -5 |

== Ward results ==
Bickenhill
| Party | Candidate | Votes | % | ±% |
|---|---|---|---|---|
| Conservative | Peter Kellie | 2,819 | 54.8 | +10.3 |
| Labour | Jeffrey Potts | 1,873 | 36.4 | −12.0 |
| Green | Annette Leyland | 455 | 8.8 | +1.7 |
| Majority | | 946 | 18.4 | +14.4 |
| Turnout | | 5,147 | 52.3 | −5.2 |
| Conservative hold | | Swing | +11.2 | |

Castle Bromwich
| Party | Candidate | Votes | % | ±% |
|---|---|---|---|---|
| Conservative | David Rees | 2,914 | 64.1 | +13.3 |
| Labour | Robert Davis | 1,314 | 28.9 | −10.2 |
| Green | Paul Adams | 319 | 7.0 | −3.0 |
| Majority | | 1,600 | 35.2 | +23.5 |
| Turnout | | 4,547 | 47.0 | −3.4 |
| Conservative hold | | Swing | +11.7 | |

Chelmsley Wood
| Party | Candidate | Votes | % | ±% |
|---|---|---|---|---|
| Labour | Nicholas Stephens | 1,565 | 62.0 | −13.9 |
| Conservative | Michael Wyldbore-Smith | 618 | 24.5 | +10.8 |
| Liberal Democrats | Olive Hogg | 339 | 13.4 | +3.1 |
| Majority | | 947 | 37.5 | −24.8 |
| Turnout | | 2,522 | 28.2 | −9.1 |
| Labour hold | | Swing | -12.4 | |

Elmdon
| Party | Candidate | Votes | % | ±% |
|---|---|---|---|---|
| Labour | Susan Knowles | 1,899 | 43.0 | −5.7 |
| Conservative | Geoffrey Wood | 1,776 | 40.2 | +6.5 |
| Independent Ratepayers | Herbert Hitchcock | 741 | 16.8 | −0.8 |
| Majority | | 123 | 2.8 | −12.3 |
| Turnout | | 4,416 | 52.3 | −2.8 |
| Labour gain from Conservative | | Swing | -6.1 | |

Fordbridge
| Party | Candidate | Votes | % | ±% |
|---|---|---|---|---|
| Labour | Robert Overton | 1,234 | 60.6 | −22.5 |
| Conservative | Elizabeth Plaister | 507 | 24.9 | +8.0 |
| Liberal Democrats | Brenda Chapple | 204 | 10.0 | +10.0 |
| Independent Labour | Peter Paget | 92 | 4.5 | +4.5 |
| Majority | | 727 | 35.7 | −30.5 |
| Turnout | | 2,037 | 29.0 | −8.2 |
| Labour hold | | Swing | -15.2 | |

Kingshurst
| Party | Candidate | Votes | % | ±% |
|---|---|---|---|---|
| Labour | David Threlkeld | 1,593 | 64.5 | −11.7 |
| Conservative | Dorothy Wallace | 622 | 25.2 | +1.4 |
| Independent Labour | Frederick Austin | 164 | 6.6 | +6.6 |
| Green | Michael Banes | 91 | 3.7 | +3.7 |
| Majority | | 971 | 39.3 | −13.0 |
| Turnout | | 2,470 | 38.6 | −3.0 |
| Labour hold | | Swing | -6.5 | |

Knowle
| Party | Candidate | Votes | % | ±% |
|---|---|---|---|---|
| Conservative | Neil Archer | 2,765 | 64.5 | +0.2 |
| Liberal Democrats | Bernadette Pruden | 1,201 | 28.0 | +6.2 |
| Labour | Derek Jones | 318 | 7.4 | −6.4 |
| Majority | | 1,564 | 36.5 | −6.0 |
| Turnout | | 4,284 | 49.7 | −1.0 |
| Conservative hold | | Swing | -3.0 | |

Lyndon
| Party | Candidate | Votes | % | ±% |
|---|---|---|---|---|
| Liberal Democrats | Ian Gillett | 2,272 | 56.1 | +1.5 |
| Conservative | Gloria Cox | 1,155 | 28.5 | +5.9 |
| Labour | Joan Holt | 626 | 15.4 | −7.4 |
| Majority | | 1,117 | 27.6 | −4.2 |
| Turnout | | 4,053 | 49.4 | −4.6 |
| Liberal Democrats hold | | Swing | -2.2 | |

Meriden
| Party | Candidate | Votes | % | ±% |
|---|---|---|---|---|
| Conservative | Kenneth Allsopp | 2,458 | 58.0 | −3.2 |
| Liberal Democrats | Arthur Crossley | 1,335 | 31.5 | +4.0 |
| Labour | Arthur Brill | 448 | 10.6 | −0.9 |
| Majority | | 1,123 | 26.5 | −7.2 |
| Turnout | | 4,241 | 50.3 | −4.9 |
| Conservative hold | | Swing | -3.6 | |

Olton
| Party | Candidate | Votes | % | ±% |
|---|---|---|---|---|
| Conservative | Michael Goodwin | 2,192 | 47.4 | +8.5 |
| Liberal Democrats | Honor Cox | 2,058 | 44.5 | −4.9 |
| Labour | William Tooth | 376 | 8.1 | −3.6 |
| Majority | | 134 | 2.9 | −7.5 |
| Turnout | | 4,626 | 49.6 | −4.0 |
| Conservative hold | | Swing | +6.7 | |

Packwood
| Party | Candidate | Votes | % | ±% |
|---|---|---|---|---|
| Liberal Democrats | Judy Morris | 2,592 | 50.3 | +5.7 |
| Conservative | Timothy Vernon | 2,191 | 42.5 | −7.1 |
| Independent | Richard Dalrymple | 243 | 4.7 | +4.7 |
| Labour | Barry Beattie | 126 | 2.4 | −3.3 |
| Majority | | 401 | 7.8 | +2.8 |
| Turnout | | 5,152 | 55.3 | +1.9 |
| Liberal Democrats gain from Conservative | | Swing | +6.4 | |

Shirley East
| Party | Candidate | Votes | % | ±% |
|---|---|---|---|---|
| Liberal Democrats | John Reeve | 2,165 | 48.4 | +9.2 |
| Conservative | Theresa Samuels | 1,900 | 42.4 | −0.1 |
| Labour | Aiden Cairns | 412 | 9.2 | −9.2 |
| Majority | | 265 | 5.9 | +2.5 |
| Turnout | | 4,477 | 48.5 | +1.0 |
| Liberal Democrats hold | | Swing | +4.6 | |

Shirley South
| Party | Candidate | Votes | % | ±% |
|---|---|---|---|---|
| Independent Ratepayers | James Eames | 3,091 | 51.3 | +5.8 |
| Conservative | Philip Cross | 2,335 | 38.8 | +0.4 |
| Labour | Robert Houghton | 596 | 9.9 | −6.2 |
| Majority | | 756 | 12.5 | +5.5 |
| Turnout | | 6,022 | 46.8 | −18.8 |
| Independent Ratepayers hold | | Swing | +2.7 | |

Shirley West
| Party | Candidate | Votes | % | ±% |
|---|---|---|---|---|
| Independent Ratepayers | Eric Pemberton | 1,881 | 47.7 | +8.5 |
| Conservative | Terence Powell | 1,488 | 37.7 | +4.8 |
| Labour | Eileen Turner | 576 | 14.6 | −13.3 |
| Majority | | 393 | 10.0 | +3.7 |
| Turnout | | 3,945 | 41.9 | +4.6 |
| Independent Ratepayers gain from Conservatives | | Swing | +1.8 | |

Silhill
| Party | Candidate | Votes | % | ±% |
|---|---|---|---|---|
| Conservative | Geoffrey Gibbons | 2,834 | 60.5 | +9.6 |
| Liberal Democrats | Bernard Winchcombe | 1,059 | 22.6 | +8.7 |
| Labour | Calvin Tattersall | 791 | 16.9 | −4.8 |
| Majority | | 1,775 | 37.9 | +8.7 |
| Turnout | | 4,684 | 46.0 | −8.4 |
| Conservative hold | | Swing | +0.4 | |

Smith's Wood
| Party | Candidate | Votes | % | ±% |
|---|---|---|---|---|
| Labour | Donald Cornock | 1,918 | 68.3 | −14.8 |
| Conservative | Richard Hubbard | 716 | 25.5 | +8.6 |
| Green | Peter May | 172 | 6.1 | +6.1 |
| Majority | | 1,202 | 42.8 | −23.4 |
| Turnout | | 2,806 | 30.8 | −4.2 |
| Labour hold | | Swing | -11.7 | |

St. Alphege
| Party | Candidate | Votes | % | ±% |
|---|---|---|---|---|
| Conservative | Ronald Herd | 3,699 | 62.1 | −4.0 |
| Conservative | Peter Cooke | 3,600 | | |
| Green | Clifford Hards | 1,505 | 25.3 | +12.2 |
| Labour | Vera Wood | 750 | 12.6 | +3.4 |
| Majority | | 2,194 | 36.8 | −16.2 |
| Turnout | | 5,954 | 51.8 | −4.6 |
| Conservative hold | | Swing | | |
| Conservative hold | | Swing | -8.1 | |
