= 1990 Welwyn Hatfield District Council election =

Welwyn Hatfield District Council election

The 1990 Welwyn Hatfield District Council election took place on 3 May 1990 to elect members of Welwyn Hatfield District Council in England. This was on the same day as other local elections.

== Summary ==
=== Election results ===
1990 Welwyn Hatfield District Council election
| Party | This election | | | Full council | | | This election | | |
| Party | Seats | Net | Seats % | Other | Total | Total % | Votes | Votes % | +/− |
|---|---|---|---|---|---|---|---|---|---|
| Labour | 10 | ▲2 | 66.7 | 14 | 24 | 55.8 | 18,013 | 44.4 | –2.1 |
| Conservative | 5 | Steady | 33.3 | 14 | 19 | 44.2 | 15,158 | 37.4 | –2.6 |
| Liberal Democrats | 0 | ▼2 | 0.0 | 0 | 0 | 0.0 | 5,329 | 13.1 | +0.5 |
| Green | 0 | Steady | 0.0 | 0 | 0 | 0.0 | 1,673 | 4.1 | N/A |
| Anti-PT | 0 | Steady | 0.0 | 0 | 0 | 0.0 | 388 | 1.0 | N/A |
