= 1990 Waveney District Council election =

1990 English local government election

- 3 May 1990

All 48 seats to Waveney District Council 25 seats needed for a majority

	First party	Second party
Party	Labour	Conservative
Seats won	14	1
Seats after	27	16
Seat change	▲7	▼7
Popular vote	19,708	10,545
Percentage	53.6%	28.7%
Swing	▲13.3%	▼11.1%
	Third party	Fourth party
Party	SLD	Independent
Seats won	1	0
Seats after	4	1
Seat change	Steady	Steady
Popular vote	4,513	1,296
Percentage	12.3%	3.5%
Swing	▼5.3%	▲1.1%
- Winner of each seat at the 1990 Waveney District Council election.
Control before election
No overall control
Control after election
Labour

The 1990 Waveney District Council election took place on 3 May 1990 to elect members of Waveney District Council in Suffolk, England. This was on the same day as other local elections.

== Summary ==
=== Election result ===
1990 Waveney District Council election
Party	This election			Full council			This election		
Party	Seats	Net	Seats %	Other	Total	Total %	Votes	Votes %	+/−
Labour	14	▲7	87.5	13	27	56.3	19,708	53.6	+13.3
Conservative	1	▼7	6.3	15	16	33.3	10,545	28.7	–11.1
SLD	1	Steady	6.3	3	4	8.3	4,513	12.3	–5.3
Independent	0	Steady	0.0	1	1	2.1	1,296	3.5	+1.1
Green	0	Steady	0.0	0	0	0.0	683	1.9	N/A

== Ward results ==
Incumbent councillors standing for re-election are marked with an asterisk (*). Changes in seats do not take into account by-elections or defections.

=== Beccles Town ===
Beccles Town
Party	Candidate	Votes	%	±%
Labour	K. Jenkins	1,886	64.4	
Conservative	L. Street	1,044	35.6	
Majority		842	28.7	
Turnout		2,929	52.2	
Registered electors		5,612		
Labour gain from Conservative		Swing		

=== Carlton ===
Carlton
Party	Candidate	Votes	%	±%
Labour	D. Gower	1,355	43.0	
Conservative	A. Braithwaite	1,124	35.6	
SLD	C. Thomas	675	21.4	
Majority		231	7.3	
Turnout		3,153	51.5	
Registered electors		6,122		
Labour gain from Conservative		Swing		

=== Gunton ===
Gunton
Party	Candidate	Votes	%	±%
SLD	A. Chamberlain*	1,104	36.1	
Conservative	C. Smith	1,075	35.1	
Labour	L. Blizzard	883	28.8	
Majority		29	0.9	
Turnout		3,058	57.9	
Registered electors		5,284		
SLD hold		Swing		

=== Harbour ===
Harbour
Party	Candidate	Votes	%	±%
Labour	R. Ford*	1,398	73.0	
Conservative	L. Guy	288	15.0	
SLD	A. Shepherd	228	11.9	
Majority		1,110	58.0	
Turnout		1,914	46.0	
Registered electors		4,161		
Labour hold		Swing		

=== Kessingland ===
Kessingland
Party	Candidate	Votes	%	±%
Labour	C. Satchell	1,148	57.8	
Conservative	B. Reader*	568	28.6	
Independent	R. Jones	271	13.6	
Majority		580	29.2	
Turnout		1,987	54.5	
Registered electors		3,644		
Labour gain from Conservative		Swing		

=== Kirkley ===
Kirkley
Party	Candidate	Votes	%	±%
Labour	T. Scott	1,104	44.6	
SLD	J. Van Pelt	1,024	41.4	
Conservative	L. Jeffery	347	14.0	
Majority		80	3.2	
Turnout		2,475	53.0	
Registered electors		4,674		
Labour hold		Swing		

=== Lothingland ===
Lothingland
Party	Candidate	Votes	%	±%
Labour	B. Hunter	1,387	56.7	
Conservative	G. Wade	738	30.2	
Green	M. Gould	322	13.2	
Majority		649	26.5	
Turnout		2,447	56.4	
Registered electors		4,340		
Labour hold		Swing		

=== Mutford ===
Mutford
Party	Candidate	Votes	%	±%
Labour	J. Taylor	435	55.1	
Conservative	S. Cole	355	44.9	
Majority		80	10.1	
Turnout		790	58.1	
Registered electors		1,360		
Labour gain from Conservative		Swing		

=== Normanston ===
Normanston
Party	Candidate	Votes	%	±%
Labour	P. Bostock	1,785	75.7	
Conservative	R. Jeffrey	353	15.0	
SLD	I. Crocker	220	9.3	
Majority		1,432	60.7	
Turnout		2,358	51.2	
Registered electors		4,607		
Labour hold		Swing		

=== Oulton Broad ===
Oulton Broad
Party	Candidate	Votes	%	±%
Labour	M. Rodgers	1,357	48.0	
Conservative	A. Choveaux*	1,077	38.1	
SLD	S. Tonge	396	14.0	
Majority		280	9.9	
Turnout		2,830	53.1	
Registered electors		5,328		
Labour gain from Conservative		Swing		

=== Pakefield ===
Pakefield
Party	Candidate	Votes	%	±%
Labour	T. Kelly	1,887	59.0	
Conservative	J. Halls	1,020	31.9	
SLD	A. Emmens	292	9.1	
Majority		867	27.1	
Turnout		3,199	56.4	
Registered electors		5,675		
Labour hold		Swing		

=== South Elmham ===
South Elmham
Party	Candidate	Votes	%	±%
Conservative	M. Rose*	399	42.1	
SLD	A. Abbott	297	31.4	
Labour	H. Holzer	251	26.5	
Majority		102	10.8	
Turnout		947	64.7	
Registered electors		1,464		
Conservative hold		Swing		

=== Southwold ===
Southwold
Party	Candidate	Votes	%	±%
Labour	R. Breach	1,043	32.8	
Conservative	R. Peck	1,014	31.9	
Independent	E. Wilkin*	762	24.0	
Green	A. Milton	361	11.4	
Majority		29	0.9	
Turnout		3,180	61.5	
Registered electors		5,170		
Labour gain from Conservative		Swing		

=== St. Margarets ===
St. Margarets
Party	Candidate	Votes	%	±%
Labour	A. Taylor*	1,646	61.7	
Conservative	J. Albrow	480	18.0	
SLD	G. Wood	277	10.4	
Independent	R. Allen	263	9.9	
Majority		1,166	43.7	
Turnout		2,666	49.3	
Registered electors		5,404		
Labour hold		Swing		

=== Wainford ===
Wainford
Party	Candidate	Votes	%	±%
Labour	A. Hutchinson	396	57.4	
Conservative	E. Torlot*	294	42.6	
Majority		102	14.8	
Turnout		690	56.8	
Registered electors		1,215		
Labour gain from Conservative		Swing		

=== Whitton ===
Whitton
Party	Candidate	Votes	%	±%
Labour	J. Hore	1,747	82.6	
Conservative	F. Seabridge	369	17.4	
Majority		1,378	65.1	
Turnout		2,116	47.3	
Registered electors		4,472		
Labour hold		Swing		

== By-elections ==
=== Kirkley ===
Kirkley by-election: 18 October 1990
Party	Candidate	Votes	%	±%
SLD		871	51.1	
Labour		666	39.1	
Conservative		166	9.7	
Majority		205	12.0	
Turnout		1,703	36.0	
Registered electors		4,731		
SLD gain from Labour		Swing		
