= 1990 North Bedfordshire Borough Council election =

North Bedfordshire Borough Council election

The 1990 North Bedfordshire Borough Council election took place on 3 May 1990 to elect members of North Bedfordshire Borough Council in England. This was on the same day as other local elections.

== Summary ==
=== Election result ===
1990 North Bedfordshire Borough Council election
Party	This election			Full council			This election		
Party	Seats	Net	Seats %	Other	Total	Total %	Votes	Votes %	+/−
Conservative	5	▼1	27.8	19	24	45.3	14,222	36.6	–1.9
Labour	8	▲2	44.4	7	15	28.3	14,824	38.1	+4.3
Liberal Democrats	5	▼1	27.8	8	13	24.5	9,330	24.0	–0.7
Independent	0	Steady	0.0	1	1	1.9	90	0.2	–2.2
Green	0	Steady	0.0	0	0	0.0	436	1.1	+0.5

== Ward results ==
=== Brickhill ===
Brickhill
Party	Candidate	Votes	%	±%
Liberal Democrats	C. Green*	1,827	52.5	+2.4
Conservative	M. Watt	1,377	39.6	+2.7
Labour	M. Khan	277	8.0	−5.0
Majority		450	12.9	
Turnout		3,481	58.2	
Registered electors		5,980		
Liberal Democrats hold		Swing		

=== Castle ===
Castle
Party	Candidate	Votes	%	±%
Labour	A. Bagchi	986	41.7	+1.9
Conservative	R. Rigby*	952	40.3	−2.7
Liberal Democrats	J. Crofts	425	18.0	+0.7
Majority		34	1.4	
Turnout		2,363	53.9	
Registered electors		4,382		
Labour gain from Conservative		Swing		

=== Cauldwell ===
Cauldwell
Party	Candidate	Votes	%	±%
Labour	V. Storrow*	1,771	75.5	+18.7
Conservative	R. Pal	306	13.0	−15.1
Liberal Democrats	A. Gerard	268	11.4	−1.5
Majority		1,465	62.5	
Turnout		2,345	41.1	
Registered electors		5,707		
Labour hold		Swing		

=== De Parys ===
De Parys
Party	Candidate	Votes	%	±%
Liberal Democrats	M. Fitzpatrick*	1,391	45.1	−3.6
Conservative	J. Wilson	1,271	41.2	+6.7
Labour	K. Buckles	422	13.7	−3.1
Majority		120	3.9	
Turnout		3,084	55.8	
Registered electors		5,529		
Liberal Democrats hold		Swing		

=== Felmersham ===
Felmersham
Party	Candidate	Votes	%	±%
Conservative	P. Barber-Lomax	842	62.4	+13.9
Liberal Democrats	G. Venn	371	27.5	−16.2
Labour	T. Carroll	137	10.1	+2.3
Majority		471	34.9	
Turnout		1,350	76.7	
Registered electors		1,759		
Conservative hold		Swing		

=== Goldington ===
Goldington
Party	Candidate	Votes	%	±%
Labour	G. Wilson	1,317	45.7	+3.0
Liberal Democrats	A. Cardus	1,019	35.4	−9.6
Conservative	H. Bushell	545	18.9	+6.6
Majority		298	10.3	
Turnout		2,881	53.6	
Registered electors		5,373		
Labour gain from Liberal Democrats		Swing		

=== Harpur ===
Harpur
Party	Candidate	Votes	%	±%
Labour	H. Mitchell	1,417	56.2	+4.7
Conservative	C. Ellis	801	31.8	−5.5
Green	A. Roche	155	6.1	N/A
Liberal Democrats	M. Borrett	148	5.9	−5.3
Majority		616	24.4	
Turnout		2,521	45.7	
Registered electors		5,514		
Labour hold		Swing		

=== Harrold ===
Harrold
Party	Candidate	Votes	%	±%
Conservative	B. Cheadle	600	51.5	+2.1
Liberal Democrats	J. Botterill	315	27.0	−0.7
Labour	J. Thynne	250	21.5	−1.4
Majority		285	24.5	
Turnout		1,165	53.1	
Registered electors		2,196		
Conservative hold		Swing		

=== Kempston East ===
Kempston East
Party	Candidate	Votes	%	±%
Labour	R. Oliver*	1,811	59.6	+13.9
Conservative	M. Williams	1,228	40.4	−1.3
Majority		583	19.2	
Turnout		3,039	42.5	
Registered electors		7,145		
Labour hold		Swing		

=== Kempston West ===
Kempston West
Party	Candidate	Votes	%	±%
Labour	S. Hunt*	1,345	53.3	+1.9
Conservative	J. Walford	959	38.0	+2.6
Liberal Democrats	D. Sawyer	219	8.7	−4.6
Majority		386	15.3	
Turnout		2,523	42.2	
Registered electors		5,983		
Labour hold		Swing		

=== Kingsbrook ===
Kingsbrook
Party	Candidate	Votes	%	±%
Labour	E. Luder*	1,612	65.7	+4.0
Conservative	J. Mingay	580	23.6	+7.4
Liberal Democrats	R. Micklem	263	10.7	−11.4
Majority		1,032	42.0	
Turnout		2,455	45.2	
Registered electors		5,427		
Labour hold		Swing		

=== Newnham ===
Newnham
Party	Candidate	Votes	%	±%
Liberal Democrats	M. Evans*	790	38.7	−5.6
Conservative	S. Halse	659	32.3	−1.0
Labour	G. Snelson	501	24.6	+2.2
Independent	D. Pettit	90	4.4	N/A
Majority		131	6.4	
Turnout		2,040	52.8	
Registered electors		3,867		
Liberal Democrats hold		Swing		

=== Oakley ===
Oakley
Party	Candidate	Votes	%	±%
Liberal Democrats	P. Olney*	506	54.6	+5.2
Conservative	A. Shackleton	350	37.8	−5.6
Labour	A. Symonds	71	7.7	+0.5
Majority		156	16.8	
Turnout		927	53.9	
Registered electors		1,720		
Liberal Democrats hold		Swing		

=== Putnoe ===
Putnoe
Party	Candidate	Votes	%	±%
Liberal Democrats	J. Marsh*	1,290	44.7	−9.0
Conservative	P. Palmer	1,163	40.3	+2.6
Labour	D. Verney	295	10.2	+1.6
Green	J. Hunt	135	4.7	
Majority		127	4.4	
Turnout		2,883	52.1	
Registered electors		5,537		
Liberal Democrats hold		Swing		

=== Queens Park ===
Queens Park
Party	Candidate	Votes	%	±%
Labour	D. Jones*	1,669	69.3	−2.2
Conservative	R. Hughes	451	18.7	+1.0
Green	E. Hunt	146	6.1	N/A
Liberal Democrats	C. Hall	144	6.0	−4.7
Majority		1,218	50.5	
Turnout		2,410	45.3	
Registered electors		5,324		
Labour hold		Swing		

=== Renhold ===
Renhold
Party	Candidate	Votes	%	±%
Conservative	H. Bone*	681	70.5	+7.4
Labour	R. Ward	197	20.4	+8.1
Liberal Democrats	A. Chybalski	88	9.1	−15.5
Majority		484	50.1	
Turnout		966	53.4	
Registered electors		1,810		
Conservative hold		Swing		

=== Riseley ===
Riseley
Party	Candidate	Votes	%	±%
Conservative	S. Cocksedge*	681	59.0	−7.3
Liberal Democrats	P. Cook	266	23.1	+7.8
Labour	M. English	207	17.9	−0.5
Majority		415	36.0	
Turnout		1,154	55.4	
Registered electors		2,083		
Conservative hold		Swing		

=== Wilshamstead ===
Wilshamstead
Party	Candidate	Votes	%	±%
Conservative	M. Hickling	776	59.0	+3.8
Labour	N. Irwin	539	41.0	+13.2
Majority		237	18.0	
Turnout		1,315	55.6	
Registered electors		2,366		
Conservative hold		Swing		
