= 1990 Worthing Borough Council election =

1990 English local election

- 3 May 1990

12 out of 36 seats to Worthing Borough Council 19 seats needed for a majority

	First party	Second party
Party	Conservative	SLD
Last election	26 seats, 59.2%	10 seats, 33.4%
Seats won	7	5
Seats after	27	9
Seat change	▲1	▼1
Popular vote	15,741	11,987
Percentage	44.7%	34.1%
Swing	▼14.5%	▲0.7%
Council control before election
Conservative
Council control after election
Conservative

The 1990 Worthing Borough Council election took place on 3 May 1990 to elect members of Worthing Borough Council in West Sussex, England. This was on the same day as other local elections.

== Summary ==
=== Election result ===
1990 Worthing Borough Council election
Party	This election				Full council			This election		
Party	Candidates	Seats	Net	Seats %	Other	Total	Total %	Votes	Votes %	+/−
Conservative	{{{candidates}}}	7	▲1	58.3	20	27	75.0	15,741	44.7	–14.5
SLD	{{{candidates}}}	5	▼1	41.7	4	9	25.0	11,987	34.1	+0.7
Labour	{{{candidates}}}	0	Steady	0.0	0	0	0.0	5,596	15.9	+8.5
Green	{{{candidates}}}	0	Steady	0.0	0	0	0.0	1,206	3.4	N/A
SDP	{{{candidates}}}	0	Steady	0.0	0	0	0.0	664	1.9	N/A

== Ward results ==
=== Broadwater ===
Broadwater
Party	Candidate	Votes	%	±%
SLD	A. Dockerty*	1,704	62.8	+8.6
Conservative	A. Blake	711	26.2	–12.3
Green	A. Ball	300	11.0	N/A
Majority		993	36.6	+20.9
Turnout		2,715	41.1	+7.4
Registered electors		6,605		
SLD hold		Swing	▲10.5	

=== Castle ===
Castle
Party	Candidate	Votes	%	±%
SLD	N. John	1,367	42.2	+20.9
Conservative	A. Cohen	1,026	31.7	–21.3
Labour	K. Fisher	846	26.1	+0.5
Majority		341	10.5	N/A
Turnout		3,239	51.4	+22.6
Registered electors		6,306		
SLD hold		Swing	▲21.1	

=== Central ===
Central
Party	Candidate	Votes	%	±%
SLD	P. Lipscombe*	1,053	42.4	–1.0
Conservative	J. Orridge	821	33.1	–11.3
Labour	H. King	344	13.9	+1.7
Green	L. Colkett	202	8.1	N/A
SDP	R. Morley	63	2.5	N/A
Majority		232	9.3	N/A
Turnout		2,483	41.1	+10.8
Registered electors		6,038		
SLD hold		Swing	▲5.2	

=== Durrington ===
Durrington
Party	Candidate	Votes	%	±%
Conservative	P. Frances	1,335	41.4	–13.4
SLD	S. Pye	1,100	34.1	–11.1
Labour	B. Perigoe	498	15.4	N/A
Green	J. Hughes	292	9.1	N/A
Majority		235	7.3	–2.2
Turnout		3,242	43.4	+8.7
Registered electors		7,428		
Conservative gain from SLD		Swing	▼1.2	

=== Gaisford ===
Gaisford
Party	Candidate	Votes	%	±%
SLD	C. Golds*	1,267	43.8	–2.1
Conservative	J. Carne	1,051	36.4	–9.2
Labour	D. Bethell	340	11.8	+3.3
Green	J. Baker	232	8.0	N/A
Majority		216	7.5	+7.2
Turnout		2,890	44.7	+11.2
Registered electors		6,465		
SLD hold		Swing	▲3.6	

=== Goring ===
Goring
Party	Candidate	Votes	%	±%
Conservative	M. Clinch*	2,050	60.5	–18.6
Labour	O. Rand	454	13.4	N/A
SLD	D. Whybred	446	13.2	–7.7
SDP	M. Meyrick	440	13.0	N/A
Majority		1,596	47.1	–11.2
Turnout		3,390	49.2	+12.5
Registered electors		6,884		
Conservative hold				

=== Heene ===
Heene
Party	Candidate	Votes	%	±%
Conservative	G. Collinson*	1,631	60.0	–11.2
SLD	L. Earl	651	24.0	–4.8
Labour	S. Dean	436	16.0	N/A
Majority		980	36.1	–6.3
Turnout		2,718	40.5	+9.0
Registered electors		6,713		
Conservative hold		Swing	▼3.2	

=== Marine ===
Marine
Party	Candidate	Votes	%	±%
Conservative	E. MacDonald*	1,802	62.9	–10.0
SLD	R. Selly	582	20.3	+3.7
Labour	J. Fisher	479	16.7	+6.2
Majority		1,220	42.6	–13.7
Turnout		2,863	45.2	+11.6
Registered electors		6,341		
Conservative hold		Swing	▼6.9	

=== Offington ===
Offington
Party	Candidate	Votes	%	±%
Conservative	D. Peters*	1,516	52.1	–13.7
SLD	E. Mardell	1,108	38.1	+3.9
Labour	A. Mann	284	9.8	N/A
Majority		408	14.0	–17.6
Turnout		2,908	46.2	+11.1
Registered electors		6,294		
Conservative hold		Swing	▼8.8	

=== Salvington ===
Salvington
Party	Candidate	Votes	%	±%
Conservative	G. Lissenburg*	1,685	55.3	–10.7
SLD	A. Clare	816	26.8	–7.2
Labour	M. Dowson	547	17.9	N/A
Majority		869	28.5	–3.4
Turnout		3,048	45.7	+10.9
Registered electors		6,665		
Conservative hold		Swing	▼1.8	

=== Selden ===
Selden
Party	Candidate	Votes	%	±%
Conservative	M. Wilton*	1,012	38.1	–13.1
Labour	J. Deen	921	34.7	+15.3
SLD	M. Moore	639	24.0	–5.4
SDP	M. Elson	86	3.2	N/A
Majority		91	3.4	–18.4
Turnout		2,658	42.4	+13.2
Registered electors		6,274		
Conservative hold		Swing	▼14.2	

=== Tarring ===
Tarring
Party	Candidate	Votes	%	±%
SLD	P. Green	1,254	41.0	+14.4
Conservative	C. Wallis	1,101	36.0	–23.6
Labour	J. Hammond	447	14.6	+0.8
Green	V. Bruce	180	5.9	N/A
SDP	G. Masters	75	2.5	N/A
Majority		153	5.0	N/A
Turnout		3,057	45.4	
Registered electors		6,739		
SLD hold		Swing	▲14.6	
