= 1990 Solihull Metropolitan Borough Council election =

1990 UK local government election

(1988 ←) 1990 United Kingdom local elections (→ 1991)

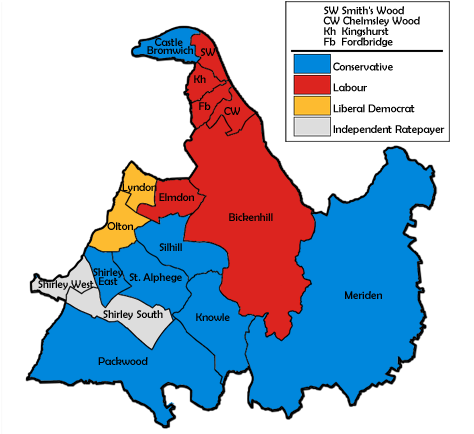
Map of the results for the 1990 Solihull council election.

The 1990 Solihull Metropolitan Borough Council elections were held on Thursday, 3 May 1990, with one third of the council to be elected. There had been a number of by-elections the previous year, with the net result being Liberal Democrat gains from the Conservatives in Shirley East and the Independent Ratepayers & Residents in Packwood. The Conservatives narrowly retained control of the council. Voter turnout was 49.5%.

== Election result ==
Solihull local election result 1990
Party	Seats	Gains	Losses	Net gain/loss	Seats %	Votes %	Votes	+/−
Conservative	7	1	2	-1	41.2	41.3	31,876	-10.6
Labour	6	1	0	+1	35.3	31.9	24,615	+5.6
Liberal Democrats	2	0	1	-1	11.8	16.7	12,849	+1.1
Independent Ratepayers & Residents	2	1	0	+1	11.8	7.1	5,499	+1.0
Green	0	0	0	0	0.0	2.9	2,214	+2.9
National Front	0	0	0	0	0.0	0.1	62	+0.1

This result had the following consequences for the total number of seats on the council after the elections:

Party	Previous council	New council
Conservatives	28	27
Labour	14	15
Liberal Democrats	6	5
Independent Ratepayers & Residents	3	4
Total	51	51
Working majority	5	3

== Ward results ==
Bickenhill
Party	Candidate	Votes	%	±%
Labour	James Ryan	2,733	48.4	+11.7
Conservative	Peter Kellie	2,510	44.5	−9.8
Green	Simone Sharpe	402	7.1	+7.1
Majority		223	3.9	−13.6
Turnout		5,645	57.5	
Labour gain from Conservative		Swing	+10.7	

Castle Bromwich
Party	Candidate	Votes	%	±%
Conservative	Beryl Bennett	2,513	50.8	−16.9
Labour	Robert Overton	1,935	39.1	+13.3
Green	Paul Adams	496	10.0	+10.0
Majority		578	11.7	−30.2
Turnout		4,944	50.4	
Conservative hold		Swing	-15.1	

Chelmsley Wood
Party	Candidate	Votes	%	±%
Labour	William Shaw	2,571	76.0	+7.4
Conservative	Michael Wyldbore-Smith	463	13.7	−10.0
Liberal Democrats	Honor Cox	349	10.3	+2.5
Majority		2,108	62.3	+17.4
Turnout		3,383	37.3	
Labour hold		Swing	-8.7	

Elmdon
Party	Candidate	Votes	%	±%
Labour	Sheila Brookes	2,344	48.7	+2.9
Conservative	Norman Page	1,620	33.7	−11.2
Independent Ratepayers	Jane Granger	844	17.5	+17.5
Majority		724	15.1	+14.0
Turnout		4,808	55.1	
Labour hold		Swing	+7.0	

Fordbridge
Party	Candidate	Votes	%	±%
Labour	Arthur Harper	2,196	83.1	+9.9
Conservative	Elizabeth Plaister	447	16.9	−9.9
Majority		1,749	66.2	+19.9
Turnout		2,643	37.2	
Labour hold		Swing	+9.9	

Kingshurst
Party	Candidate	Votes	%	±%
Labour	Ben Magee	2,047	76.2	+8.2
Conservative	Dorothy Wallace	640	23.8	−8.2
Majority		1,407	52.4	+16.4
Turnout		2,687	41.6	
Labour hold		Swing	+8.2	

Knowle
Party	Candidate	Votes	%	±%
Conservative	Geoffrey Wright	2,834	64.3	−8.1
Liberal Democrats	Bernadette Pruden	962	21.8	+4.2
Labour	Stephen Parkes	611	13.9	+3.9
Majority		1,872	42.5	−12.3
Turnout		4,407	50.7	
Conservative hold		Swing	-6.1	

Lyndon
Party	Candidate	Votes	%	±%
Liberal Democrats	Norman Chapple	2,441	54.6	+11.4
Labour	Frederick Austin	1,020	22.8	+5.5
Conservative	Alan Power	1,011	22.6	−16.9
Majority		1,421	31.8	+28.1
Turnout		4,472	54.0	
Liberal Democrats hold		Swing	+2.9	

Meriden
Party	Candidate	Votes	%	±%
Conservative	Peter Lea	2,866	61.1	+1.6
Liberal Democrats	Arthur Crossley	1,287	27.4	−4.4
Labour	Elizabeth O'Brien	536	11.4	+2.8
Majority		1,579	33.7	+5.9
Turnout		4,689	55.2	
Conservative hold		Swing	+3.0	

Olton
Party	Candidate	Votes	%	±%
Liberal Democrats	John Windmill	2,462	49.4	+13.3
Conservative	Michael Goodwin	1,941	38.9	−16.6
Labour	Arthur Davis	583	11.7	+3.2
Majority		521	10.4	−9.0
Turnout		4,986	53.6	
Liberal Democrats hold		Swing	+15.0	

Packwood
Party	Candidate	Votes	%	±%
Conservative	Peter Llewellyn	2,459	49.6	−13.0
Liberal Democrats	Judy Morris	2,212	44.6	+13.4
Labour	Eileen Turner	286	5.8	−0.4
Majority		247	5.0	−26.4
Turnout		4,957	53.4	
Conservative gain from Liberal Democrats		Swing	-13.2	

Shirley East
Party	Candidate	Votes	%	±%
Conservative	Richard Lewis	1,973	42.5	−9.4
Liberal Democrats	Raymond Moore	1,815	39.1	+39.1
Labour	Aiden Cairns	852	18.4	+3.8
Majority		158	3.4	−14.9
Turnout		4,640	47.5	
Conservative hold		Swing	-24.2	

Shirley South
Party	Candidate	Votes	%	±%
Independent Ratepayer	Richard Jackson	2,796	45.5	−8.1
Conservative	Peter Cooke	2,360	38.4	+0.8
Labour	William Tooth	992	16.1	+7.3
Majority		436	7.1	−8.9
Turnout		6,148	65.6	
Independent Ratepayers hold		Swing	-4.4	

Shirley West
Party	Candidate	Votes	%	±%
Independent Ratepayers	Benda Otton	1,859	39.2	+39.2
Conservative	Keith Samuels	1,561	32.9	−20.3
Labour	Jeffrey Potts	1,325	27.9	+6.1
Majority		298	6.3	−21.9
Turnout		4,745	37.3	
Independent Ratepayers gain from Conservative		Swing	+29.7	

Silhill
Party	Candidate	Votes	%	±%
Conservative	George Hill	2,629	50.9	−17.4
Labour	Calvin Tattersall	1,121	21.7	+8.5
Liberal Democrats	Richard Blight	719	13.9	−4.6
Green	Clifford Hards	635	12.3	+12.3
National Front	Norman Tomkinson	62	1.2	+1.2
Majority		1,508	29.2	−20.6
Turnout		5,166	54.4	
Conservative hold		Swing	-13.0	

Smith's Wood
Party	Candidate	Votes	%	±%
Labour	Hugh Hendry	2,983	83.1	+7.8
Conservative	Kenneth Allsopp	606	16.9	−7.8
Majority		2,377	66.2	+15.6
Turnout		3,589	35.0	
Labour hold		Swing	+7.8	

St. Alphege
Party	Candidate	Votes	%	±%
Conservative	Fraser Mitchell	3,443	66.1	−10.1
Green	Adrian Mabe	681	13.1	+13.1
Liberal Democrats	Bernard Winchcombe	602	11.6	−5.2
Labour	Maurice Jones	480	9.2	+2.2
Majority		2,762	53.0	−6.4
Turnout		5,206	56.4	
Conservative hold		Swing	-11.6	

== By-elections between 1990 and 1991 ==
Shirley West by-election 13 December 1990
Party	Candidate	Votes	%	±%
Independent Ratepayers	Jane Granger	1,115	56.6	+17.4
Conservative	Keith Samuels	643	32.6	−0.3
Labour	Eileen Turner	213	10.8	−17.1
Majority		472	24.0	+17.7
Turnout		1,971	21.2	−16.1
Independent Ratepayers gain from Conservative		Swing	+29.7	
