= 1990 St Albans City and District Council election =

1990 English local election

The 1990 St Albans City and District Council election took place on 3 May 1990 to elect members of St Albans City and District Council in England. This was on the same day as other local elections.

== Summary ==
1990 St Albans City and District Council election
Party	This election			Full council			This election		
Party	Seats	Net	Seats %	Other	Total	Total %	Votes	Votes %	+/−
Conservative	5	▼1	26.3	26	31	54.4	16,888	33.1	–16.1
Liberal Democrats	10	Steady	52.6	7	17	29.8	15,184	29.8	–0.6
Labour	3	Steady	15.8	5	8	14.0	13,561	26.6	+6.6
Independent	1	▲1	5.3	0	1	1.8	1,387	2.7	N/A
Green	0	Steady	0.0	0	0	0.0	3,999	7.8	+7.5

== Ward results ==
=== Ashley ===
Ashley
Party	Candidate	Votes	%	±%
Liberal Democrats	T. Allison*	1,119	40.6	+1.9
Labour	C. Hayward	911	33.1	+11.3
Conservative	P. Barnes	564	20.5	–19.1
Green	E. Benjamin	162	5.9	N/A
Majority		208	7.5	N/A
Turnout		2,756	55.0	+12.6
Registered electors		5,015		
Liberal Democrats hold		Swing	▼4.7	

=== Batchwood ===
Batchwood
Party	Candidate	Votes	%	±%
Labour	D. McManus*	1,423	54.5	+12.8
Conservative	J. Christie	561	21.5	–12.7
Liberal Democrats	R. Biddle	375	14.4	–9.7
Green	S. Adamson	251	9.6	N/A
Majority		862	33.0	+25.5
Turnout		2,610	55.2	+5.7
Registered electors		4,727		
Labour hold		Swing	▲12.8	

=== Clarence ===
Clarence
Party	Candidate	Votes	%	±%
Liberal Democrats	S. Burton*	1,318	51.4	+12.2
Conservative	T. Boyle	597	23.3	–22.0
Labour	A. Conway	475	18.5	+5.1
Green	A. Tindale	175	6.8	N/A
Majority		721	28.1	N/A
Turnout		2,565	61.4	+4.8
Registered electors		4,179		
Liberal Democrats hold		Swing	▲17.1	

=== Colney Heath ===
Colney Heath
Party	Candidate	Votes	%	±%
Liberal Democrats	J. Henchley	649	41.2	–7.8
Conservative	J. Jeffrey	457	29.0	–8.5
Labour	C. Nash	394	25.0	+11.6
Green	V. Lock	74	4.7	N/A
Majority		192	12.2	+0.7
Turnout		1,574	56.3	+7.6
Registered electors		2,796		
Liberal Democrats hold		Swing	▲0.4	

=== Cunningham ===
Cunningham
Party	Candidate	Votes	%	±%
Liberal Democrats	C. Gunner*	1,167	40.0	+0.5
Labour	C. Donovan	931	31.9	+11.2
Conservative	M. Wragg	706	24.2	–15.6
Green	E. Brown	117	4.0	N/A
Majority		236	8.1	N/A
Turnout		2,921	58.4	+10.3
Registered electors		4,999		
Liberal Democrats hold		Swing	▼5.4	

=== Harpenden East ===
Harpenden East
Party	Candidate	Votes	%	±%
Liberal Democrats	P. Burrows*	1,205	39.5	+12.2
Conservative	R. White	1,134	37.2	–21.4
Labour	D. Crew	457	15.0	+5.9
Green	J. Bishop	254	8.3	+3.3
Majority		71	2.3	N/A
Turnout		3,050	61.0	+4.7
Registered electors		4,999		
Liberal Democrats hold		Swing	▲16.8	

=== Harpenden North ===
Harpenden North
Party	Candidate	Votes	%	±%
Conservative	K. Haywood*	1,386	48.2	–12.6
Liberal Democrats	H. Adams	652	22.7	–3.4
Labour	B. Saffery	624	21.7	+8.5
Green	J. Baker	211	7.3	N/A
Majority		734	25.5	–9.2
Turnout		2,873	49.0	+8.4
Registered electors		5,860		
Conservative hold		Swing	▼4.6	

=== Harpenden South ===
Harpenden South
Party	Candidate	Votes	%	±%
Conservative	K. McCaw*	1,460	54.9	–16.3
Liberal Democrats	A. Steer	472	17.7	–0.5
Labour	K. Holmes	456	17.1	+6.8
Green	A. Pearce	273	10.3	N/A
Majority		988	37.1	–15.7
Turnout		2,661	52.2	+13.3
Registered electors		5,095		
Conservative hold		Swing	▼7.9	

=== Harpenden West ===
Harpenden West
Party	Candidate	Votes	%	±%
Conservative	J. Roberts*	1,407	54.4	–13.4
Liberal Democrats	C. Canfield	515	19.9	–3.9
Labour	J. O'Brien	375	14.5	+6.1
Green	F. McKenzie	291	11.2	N/A
Majority		892	34.5	–9.5
Turnout		2,588	52.3	+12.5
Registered electors		4,951		
Conservative hold		Swing	▼4.8	

=== London Colney ===
London Colney
Party	Candidate	Votes	%	±%
Labour	R. Ransted*	1,585	61.0	+0.7
Conservative	B. Cozens	613	23.6	–9.2
Liberal Democrats	R. Gunner	243	9.3	+4.7
Green	J. Stone	158	6.1	N/A
Majority		972	37.4	+12.2
Turnout		2,599	47.4	+3.9
Registered electors		5,485		
Labour hold		Swing	▲5.0	

=== Marshallwick North ===
Marshallwick North
Party	Candidate	Votes	%	±%
Liberal Democrats	G. Churchard*	1,203	44.2	+11.4
Conservative	P. Johnston	967	35.5	–20.2
Labour	A. Rose	397	14.6	+3.0
Green	A-M. Harrison	154	5.7	N/A
Majority		236	8.7	N/A
Turnout		2,691	55.4	+6.2
Registered electors		4,908		
Liberal Democrats hold		Swing	▲15.8	

=== Marshallwick South ===
Marshallwick South
Party	Candidate	Votes	%	±%
Liberal Democrats	A. Rowlands*	1,410	44.0	+14.2
Conservative	J. Smih	1,139	35.6	–19.2
Labour	D. Allan	511	16.0	+0.6
Green	J. Harrington	141	4.4	N/A
Majority		271	8.5	N/A
Turnout		3,201	62.1	+7.6
Registered electors		5,156		
Liberal Democrats hold		Swing	▲16.7	

=== Park Street ===
Park Street
Party	Candidate	Votes	%	±%
Liberal Democrats	E. Hendry	744	34.0	–4.9
Conservative	D. Minter	730	33.4	–14.7
Labour	L. Adams	468	21.4	+8.4
Green	S. Hart	244	11.2	N/A
Majority		14	0.6	N/A
Turnout		2,186	50.3	+8.4
Registered electors		4,347		
Liberal Democrats hold		Swing	▲4.9	

=== Redbourn ===
Redbourn
Party	Candidate	Votes	%	±%
Conservative	D. Robinson*	1,054	47.9	–11.1
Labour	P. Murphy	641	29.1	+16.6
Green	D. Cockcroft	504	22.9	N/A
Majority		413	18.8	–11.7
Turnout		2,199	50.3	+5.8
Registered electors		4,368		
Conservative hold		Swing	▼13.9	

No Liberal Democrat candidate as previous (28.5%).

=== Sopwell ===
Sopwell
Party	Candidate	Votes	%	±%
Labour	Kerry Pollard*	1,770	65.2	+15.7
Conservative	G. Brown	387	14.2	–2.9
Liberal Democrats	P. Halpin	334	12.3	–21.0
Green	C. Hart	225	8.3	N/A
Majority		1,383	50.9	+34.7
Turnout		2,716	54.2	+2.8
Registered electors		5,013		
Labour hold		Swing	▲9.3	

=== St. Peters ===
St. Peters
Party	Candidate	Votes	%	±%
Liberal Democrats	P. Thompson*	1,125	43.4	+4.9
Labour	D. Paton	826	31.9	+2.8
Conservative	R. Wakerley	416	16.1	–16.3
Green	C. Simmons	224	8.6	N/A
Majority		299	11.5	+5.3
Turnout		2,591	54.9	+6.6
Registered electors		4,718		
Liberal Democrats hold		Swing	▲1.1	

=== St. Stephens ===
St. Stephens
Party	Candidate	Votes	%	±%
Independent	A. Neasel	1,387	39.7	N/A
Conservative	M. Heap*	987	28.2	–25.0
Liberal Democrats	J. Evans	584	16.7	–18.4
Labour	N. Williamson	435	12.4	+0.7
Green	H. Clemow	105	3.0	N/A
Majority		400	11.4	N/A
Turnout		3,498	62.0	+11.6
Registered electors		5,646		
Independent gain from Conservative		Swing	N/A	

=== Verulam ===
Verulam
Party	Candidate	Votes	%	±%
Conservative	R. Moss*	1,286	44.2	–19.6
Liberal Democrats	A. Gunner	742	25.5	+1.5
Labour	J. Bellchambers	567	19.5	+7.4
Green	W. Berrington	317	10.9	N/A
Majority		544	18.7	–21.1
Turnout		2,912	57.9	+6.3
Registered electors		5,029		
Conservative hold		Swing	▼10.6	

=== Wheathampstead ===
Wheathampstead
Party	Candidate	Votes	%	±%
Liberal Democrats	S. Whittaker*	1,327	47.4	+10.6
Conservative	R. Ansell	1,037	37.1	–15.8
Labour	K. Spooner	315	11.3	+1.1
Green	F. Ellis	119	4.3	N/A
Majority		290	10.4	N/A
Turnout		2,798	58.9	+5.9
Registered electors		4,752		
Liberal Democrats hold		Swing	▲13.2	
