= 1990 Hertsmere Borough Council election =

Local election in England

- 3 May 1990

13 out of 39 seats to Hertsmere Borough Council 20 seats needed for a majority
- Registered: 45,979
- Turnout: 49.1% (▲10.5%)

	First party	Second party
Party	Conservative	Labour
Seats won	8	2
Seats after	22	12
Seat change	Steady	Steady
Popular vote	10,792	6,328
Percentage	46.9%	27.5%
Swing	▼8.3%	▲2.2%
	Third party	Fourth party
Party	SLD	Independent
Seats won	2	1
Seats after	4	1
Seat change	▼1	▲1
Popular vote	4,763	1,134
Percentage	20.7%	4.9%
Swing	▲5.1%	N/A
- Winner of each seat at the 1990 Hertsmere Borough Council election. Wards in white were not contested.
Control before election
Conservative
Control after election
Conservative

The 1990 Hertsmere Borough Council election took place on 3 May 1990 to elect members of Hertsmere Borough Council in Hertfordshire, England. This was on the same day as other local elections.

== Summary ==
=== Election result ===
1990 Hertsmere Borough Council election
Party	This election				Full council			This election		
Party	Candidates	Seats	Net	Seats %	Other	Total	Total %	Votes	Votes %	+/−
Conservative	{{{candidates}}}	8	Steady	61.5	14	22	56.4	10,792	46.9	–8.3
Labour	{{{candidates}}}	2	Steady	15.4	10	12	30.8	6,323	27.5	+2.2
SLD	{{{candidates}}}	2	▼1	15.4	2	4	10.3	4,763	20.7	+5.1
Independent	{{{candidates}}}	1	▲1	7.7	0	1	2.6	1,134	4.9	N/A

== Ward results ==
Incumbent councillors standing for re-election are marked with an asterisk (*). Changes in seats do not take into account by-elections or defections.

=== Aldenham East ===
Aldenham East
Party	Candidate	Votes	%	±%
Conservative	A. Gattward*	1,233	69.4	+1.6
Labour	R. Page	293	16.5	+10.9
SLD	J. Dennes	251	14.1	–12.4
Majority		940	52.9	+11.6
Turnout		1,777	51.0	–3.9
Registered electors		3,512		
Conservative hold		Swing	▼4.7	

=== Brookmeadow ===
Brookmeadow
Party	Candidate	Votes	%	±%
Labour	A. Whitby	1,219	82.9	+23.5
Conservative	A. Savage	251	17.1	–6.9
Majority		968	65.8	N/A
Turnout		1,470	48.9	+7.5
Registered electors		3,014		
Labour hold		Swing	▲15.2	

=== Elstree ===
Elstree
Party	Candidate	Votes	%	±%
Independent	K. Lamb	1,134	53.9	N/A
Conservative	C. Watts*	970	46.1	–20.5
Majority		164	7.8	N/A
Turnout		2,104	50.0	+6.3
Registered electors		4,228		
Independent gain from Conservative				

=== Heath North ===
Heath North
Party	Candidate	Votes	%	±%
Conservative	S. Swerling	932	51.2	–14.5
Labour	D. Hoeksma	446	24.5	+10.1
SLD	D. Ewington	441	24.2	+4.2
Majority		486	27.0	–18.7
Turnout		1,819	45.7	+10.4
Registered electors		3,986		
Conservative hold		Swing	▼12.3	

=== Heath South ===
Heath South
Party	Candidate	Votes	%	±%
Conservative	R. Gealy*	1,062	64.4	–8.3
Labour	D. Bearfield	335	20.3	+7.3
SLD	P. Forsyth	252	15.3	N/A
Majority		727	44.1	–14.4
Turnout		1,649	42.0	+4.2
Registered electors		3,882		
Conservative hold		Swing	▼7.8	

=== Kenilworth ===
Kenilworth
Party	Candidate	Votes	%	±%
Labour	B. Stanley	1,083	76.2	+26.6
Conservative	R. Pavitt	339	23.8	–6.7
Majority		744	52.4	+33.2
Turnout		1,422	47.7	+3.0
Registered electors		2,979		
Labour hold		Swing	▲16.7	

=== Mill ===
Mill
Party	Candidate	Votes	%	±%
SLD	M. Colne	1,217	63.4	–9.0
Conservative	B. Flashman	396	20.6	+1.4
Labour	S. Mercado	308	16.0	+7.6
Majority		821	42.8	–10.4
Turnout		1,921	55.7	–2.3
Registered electors		3,459		
SLD hold		Swing	▼5.2	

=== Potters Bar Central ===
Potters Bar Central
Party	Candidate	Votes	%	±%
Conservative	I. Fielding*	670	43.3	–7.7
Labour	B. Kerr	469	30.3	+8.5
SLD	J. Hurd	407	26.3	–0.8
Majority		201	13.0	–10.9
Turnout		1,546	49.1	+6.4
Registered electors		3,157		
Conservative hold		Swing	▼8.1	

=== Potters Bar East ===
Potters Bar East
Party	Candidate	Votes	%	±%
Conservative	H. Spratt*	1,051	43.6	–20.5
Labour	P. Caylor	980	40.7	+19.8
SLD	M. Allan	377	15.7	+0.7
Majority		71	2.9	–40.3
Turnout		2,408	50.8	+13.6
Registered electors		4,753		
Conservative hold		Swing	▼20.2	

=== Potters Bar North ===
Potters Bar North
Party	Candidate	Votes	%	±%
Conservative	M. Byrne*	1,106	65.9	–10.7
Labour	J. Clark	312	18.6	+10.0
SLD	C. Dean	261	15.5	+0.6
Majority		794	47.3	–14.4
Turnout		1,679	45.8	+8.4
Registered electors		3,681		
Conservative hold		Swing	▼10.4	

=== Potters Bar South ===
Potters Bar South
Party	Candidate	Votes	%	±%
Conservative	R. Morris	652	44.4	–22.6
Labour	P. Bradbury	604	41.1	+18.0
SLD	D. Martin	213	14.5	+4.5
Majority		48	3.3	–40.6
Turnout		1,469	51.5	+15.5
Registered electors		2,863		
Conservative hold		Swing	▼20.3	

=== St. James East ===
St. James East
Party	Candidate	Votes	%	±%
SLD	E. Gadsden*	674	45.4	–7.7
Conservative	C. Keates	452	30.5	–5.2
Labour	P. Halsey	358	24.1	+12.8
Majority		222	14.9	–2.5
Turnout		1,484	49.2	+4.1
Registered electors		3,023		
SLD hold		Swing	▼1.3	

=== St. James West ===
St. James West
Party	Candidate	Votes	%	±%
Conservative	D. Chettleburgh	828	45.5	–11.3
SLD	A. Golland	670	36.8	+2.7
Labour	G. De Groot	323	17.7	+8.5
Majority		158	8.7	–14.0
Turnout		1,821	53.2	+4.4
Registered electors		3,442		
Conservative gain from SLD		Swing	▼7.0	
