= 1990 Bolton Metropolitan Borough Council election =

1990 UK local government election

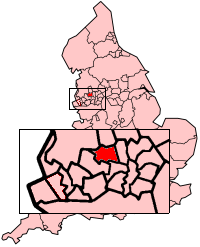
The Metropolitan Borough of Bolton shown within England

The 1990 Bolton Metropolitan Borough Council election took place on 4 May 1990 to elect members of Bolton Metropolitan Borough Council in Greater Manchester, England. One third of the council was up for election and the Labour Party kept overall control of the council

22 seats were contested in the election: 18 were won by the Labour Party, 3 by the Conservative Party, and 1 by the Liberal Democrats. There were 2 seats each contested in both the Farnworth and the Kearsley wards. After the election, the composition of the council was:

- Labour 43
- Conservative 14
- Liberal Democrats 3

== Election results ==
Bolton local election result 1990
Party	Seats	Gains	Losses	Net gain/loss	Seats %	Votes %	Votes	+/−
Labour	18	4	0	+4		55.3	58,682	+5.6
Conservative	3	0	2	-2		25.2	26,693	-8.0
Liberal Democrats	1	0	2	-2		14.6	15,481	+0.7
Other parties	0	0	0			4.9	5,178	+1.7

== Council Composition ==
Prior to the election the composition of the council was:

↓
39	16	5
Labour	Conservative	L

After the election the composition of the council was:

↓
43	14	3
Labour	Conservative	L

LD – Liberal Democrats

== Ward results ==
=== Astley Bridge ward ===
Astley Bridge ward
Party	Candidate	Votes	%	±%
Labour	S Hynes	2,650	46.8	+3.0
Conservative	D Shepherd	2,585	45.6	−1.5
Liberal Democrats	S Ball	431	7.6	−1.5
Majority		65	1.1	
Turnout		5,666	51.0	+8.0
Labour gain from Conservative		Swing	Con to Labour 2.2	

=== Blackrod ward ===
Blackrod ward
Party	Candidate	Votes	%	±%
Labour	J Monaghan	3,201	65.2	+22.0
Conservative	K Rigg	1,138	23.2	−11.4
Liberal Democrats	C Kay	568	11.6	+4.0
Majority		2,063	42.0	+33.3
Turnout		4,907	58.2	+9.2
Labour hold		Swing	Con to Labour 16.7	

=== Bradshaw ward ===
Bradshaw ward
Party	Candidate	Votes	%	±%
Conservative	A Osborn	2,170	43.5	−7.5
Labour	M Clare	2,012	40.4	+7.7
Liberal Democrats	A Steele	447	9.0	−7.3
Green	M Calvert	356	7.1	+7.1
Majority		158	3.2	−15.1
Turnout		4,985	41.7	+5.4
Conservative hold		Swing	Con to Labour 7.6	

=== Breightmet ward ===
Breightmet ward
Party	Candidate	Votes	%	±%
Labour	C Benjamin	3,232	67.7	+4.0
Conservative	J Edge	1,205	25.3	−2.9
Liberal Democrats	S Vickers	335	7.0	−1.1
Majority		2,027	42.5	+7.0
Turnout		4,772	43.7	+4.8
Labour hold		Swing	Con to Labour 3.4	

=== Bromley Cross ward ===
Bromley Cross ward
Party	Candidate	Votes	%	±%
Conservative	B Hurst	2,490	47.5	+0.2
Labour	P Perry	1,853	35.3	+15.4
Green	A Kemp	523	10.0	+10.0
Liberal Democrats	C Atty	380	7.2	+1.0
Majority		637	12.1	−8.7
Turnout		5,246	46.6	+1.4
Conservative hold		Swing		

=== Burnden ward ===
Burnden ward
Party	Candidate	Votes	%	±%
Labour	P Howarth	2,705	61.5	−0.6
Conservative	S Hornby	1,037	23.6	−5.8
Liberal Democrats	P Howarth	445	10.1	+1.6
Islamic Party	A Khalique	210	4.8	+4.8
Majority		1,668	37.9	+5.3
Turnout		4,397	45.0	+5.0
Labour hold		Swing	Con to LD 3.7	

=== Central ward ===
Central ward
Party	Candidate	Votes	%	±%
Labour	B Iddon	3,164	75.8	−0.8
Conservative	L Kay	404	9.7	−7.0
Islamic Party	M Marothi	344	8.2	+8.2
Liberal Democrats	S Howarth	262	6.3	−0.4
Majority		2,760	66.2	+6.2
Turnout		4,174	52.5	+13.4
Labour hold		Swing	Con to IP 7.6	

=== Daubhill ward ===
Daubhill ward
Party	Candidate	Votes	%	±%
Labour	G Harkin	3,153	73.5	+4.3
Conservative	A Waterson	769	18.7	−7.6
Liberal Democrats	G Langdon	335	7.9	+3.4
Majority		2,339	54.8	+11.9
Turnout		4,266	48.3	+7.2
Labour hold		Swing	Con to Labour 5.9	

=== Deane-cum-Heaton ward ===
Deane-cum-Heaton ward
Party	Candidate	Votes	%	±%
Conservative	B Allanson	3,285	50.2	−7.8
Labour	R Evans	2,455	37.5	+6.3
Liberal Democrats	L Easterman	524	8.0	−2.7
Green	P Upman	281	4.3	+4.3
Majority		830	12.7	−14.1
Turnout		6,545	48.0	+9.9
Conservative hold		Swing	Con to Labour 7.0	

=== Derby ward ===
Derby ward
Party	Candidate	Votes	%	±%
Labour	G Riley	3,676	79.1	+0.4
Islamic Party	K Hussain	469	10.1	+10.1
Conservative	F Tebbutt	337	7.3	−4.9
Liberal Democrats	D Watts	163	3.5	−0.8
Majority		3,207	69.0	+2.4
Turnout		4,645	50.1	+10.7
Labour hold		Swing	Con to Labour 2.6	

=== Farnworth ward ===
Farnworth ward
Party	Candidate	Votes	%	±%
Labour	P Johnston	2,131	29.1	
Labour	A Devlin	2,055	28.1	
Independent Labour	W Hardman	1,805	24.7	
Conservative	C Adams	485	6.6	
Conservative	J Adams	422	5.8	
Liberal Democrats	P Barnet	264	3.6	
SDP	I Torkington	185	2.2	
Majority				
Turnout		7,320	49.0	+16.3
Labour hold		Swing		
Labour hold		Swing		

=== Halliwell ward ===
Halliwell ward
Party	Candidate	Votes	%	±%
Labour	J Kilcoyne	3,166	65.6	−1.2
Liberal Democrats	J Henry	652	13.5	+0.7
Conservative	J Batley	651	13.5	−6.9
Islamic Party	M Khan	178	3.7	+3.7
Green	B Childs	178	3.7	+3.7
Majority		2,514	52.1	+5.6
Turnout		4,825	50.6	+7.6
Labour hold		Swing	Con to LD 3.8	

=== Harper Green ward ===
Harper Green ward
Party	Candidate	Votes	%	±%
Labour	L Williamson	3,236	74.4	+4.6
Conservative	C Churchman	686	15.8	−6.1
Liberal Democrats	L Sanderson	425	9.8	+1.5
Majority		2,550	58.7	+10.8
Turnout		4,347	42.0	+9.5
Labour hold		Swing	Con to Labour 5.2	

=== Horwich ward ===
Horwich ward
Party	Candidate	Votes	%	±%
Labour	I Carruthers	2,894	45.6	−0.5
Liberal Democrats	B Ronson	2,091	32.9	+14.7
Conservative	M Perks	1,175	18.5	−11.1
Green	H Connor	188	3.0	
Majority		803	12.6	−3.9
Turnout		6,348	55.6	+7.1
Labour gain from Liberal Democrats		Swing	Con to LD 12.9	

=== Hulton Park ward ===
Hulton Park ward
Party	Candidate	Votes	%	±%
Labour	E Hyland	2,495	45.9	+19.4
Conservative	D Wilcox	2,138	39.4	−7.4
Liberal Democrats	S Mather	797	14.7	−12.0
Majority		357	6.6	
Turnout		5,430	45.7	+8.4
Labour gain from Liberal Democrats		Swing	LD to Labour 15.7	

=== Kearsley ward ===
Kearsley ward
Party	Candidate	Votes	%	±%
Labour	F Hampson	3,059	32.4	
Labour	P Spencer	2,732	28.9	
Liberal Democrats	J Rothwell	1,609	17.0	
Liberal Democrats	L Baron	1,099	11.6	
Conservative	M Briscoe	470	5.0	
Conservative	H Briscoe	470	5.0	
Majority				
Turnout		9,439	47.6	+7.3
Labour hold		Swing		
Labour hold		Swing		

=== Little Lever ward ===
Little Lever ward
Party	Candidate	Votes	%	±%
Labour	A Connell	3,067	58.8	+11.9
Conservative	J Cosgrove	1,807	34.6	−8.6
Liberal Democrats	W Crook	342	6.6	−1.2
Majority		1,260	24.1	+22.0
Turnout		5,216	55.4	+10.2
Labour gain from Conservative		Swing	Con to Labour 10.2	

=== Smithills ward ===
Smithills ward
Party	Candidate	Votes	%	±%
Liberal Democrats	Mary Rankine Mason	2,089	40.8	−6.8
Conservative	G Gibson	1,311	25.6	−8.9
Labour	J Byrne	1,232	24.1	+8.5
Independent	S Graeme	325	6.3	+6.3
Green	P Hackin	163	3.2	+3.2
Majority		778	15.2	+2.1
Turnout		5,120	58.6	+4.8
Liberal Democrats hold		Swing	Con to Labour 8.7	

=== Tonge ward ===
Tonge ward
Party	Candidate	Votes	%	±%
Labour	J Mason	2,694	58.1	−1.4
Conservative	P Hamer	1,142	24.6	−10.9
Liberal Democrats	B Dunning	802	17.3	+12.3
Majority		1,552	33.5	+9.5
Turnout		4,638	52.4	+6.0
Labour hold		Swing	Con to LD 11.6	

=== Westhoughton ward ===
Westhoughton ward
Party	Candidate	Votes	%	±%
Labour	R Fairhurst	1,838	51.0	+7.1
Liberal Democrats	P Mather	1,278	35.5	+6.3
Conservative	A Cole	489	13.6	−13.3
Majority		560	15.5	+0.8
Turnout		3,605	46.3	+6.7
Labour hold		Swing	Con to Labour 10.2	
