= 1990 Broxbourne Borough Council election =

1990 UK local government election

The Broxbourne Council election, 1990 was held to elect council members of the Broxbourne Borough Council, the local government authority of the borough of Broxbourne, Hertfordshire, England.

== Composition of expiring seats before election ==
Ward	Party	Incumbent Elected	Incumbent	Standing again?
Broxbourne	Conservative	1986	Don Smith	Yes
Bury Green	Conservative	1986	Brian Creamer	Yes
Cheshunt Central	Conservative	1986	George Batchelor	Yes
Cheshunt North	Conservative	1986	Don Poole	Yes
Flamstead End	Conservative	1986	Edward Rowlands	No
Goffs Oak	Conservative	1986	Marie Dowsett	Yes
Hoddesdon North	Conservative	1986	James Grethe	No
Hoddesdon Town	Conservative	1986	Michael lavender	Yes
Rosedale	SDP-Liberal Alliance	1986	James Emslie	No
Rye Park	Conservative	1986	Bob King	No
Theobalds	Conservative	1989	Patricia Morris	Yes
Waltham Cross North	Conservative	1986	Norman Ames	Yes
Waltham Cross South	Labour	1986	Henry Lucas	No
Wormley & Turnford	Conservative	1986	Brian Hill	Yes

== Election results ==
Broxbourne local election result 1990
Party	Seats	Gains	Losses	Net gain/loss	Seats %	Votes %	Votes	+/−
Conservative	11	0	1	-1	73.33	49.65	14,287	
Labour	3	1	0	+1	20.00	33.97	9,704	
Liberal Democrats	1	0	0	0	6.67	16.00	4,571	
Green	0	0	0	0	0.00	0.38	108	

== Results summary ==
An election was held in 14 wards on 3 May 1990.

15 council seats were contested (2 seats in Hoddesdon North Ward)

The Labour Party gained a seat from the Conservative Party in Bury Green Ward

- Conservative 35 seats
- Labour 6 seats
- Liberal Democrats 1 Seat

== Ward results ==
Broxbourne Ward Result 3 May 1990
Party	Candidate	Votes	%	±%
Conservative	Donald Smith	1,397	62.78	
Liberal Democrats	Malcolm Aitken	434	19.51	
Labour	John Atkins	394	17.71	
Majority		963		
Turnout		2,225	40.50	
Conservative hold		Swing		

Bury Green Ward Result 3 May 1990
Party	Candidate	Votes	%	±%
Labour	John Draper	1,307	48.37	
Conservative	Brian Creamer	1,152	42.64	
Liberal Democrats	Charles Shuman	243	8.99	
Majority		155		
Turnout		2,702	47.80	
Labour gain from Conservative		Swing		

Cheshunt Central Ward Result 3 May 1990
Party	Candidate	Votes	%	±%
Conservative	George Batchelor	889	57.39	
Labour	Sarah Draper	445	28.73	
Liberal Democrats	Carolyn Arney	215	13.88	
Majority		444		
Turnout		1,549	43.70	
Conservative hold		Swing		

Cheshunt North Ward Result 3 May 1990
Party	Candidate	Votes	%	±%
Conservative	Donald Poole	1,059	48.82	
Labour	Graham Knight	796	36.70	
Liberal Democrats	Peter Kemp	314	14.48	
Majority		263		
Turnout		2,169	41.30	
Conservative hold		Swing		

Flamstead End Ward Result 3 May 1990
Party	Candidate	Votes	%	±%
Conservative	Sheila Kendall	1,079	54.83	
Labour	Derrick Shiers	645	32.77	
Liberal Democrats	Rachel Hills	244	12.40	
Majority		434		
Turnout		1,968	41.70	
Conservative hold		Swing		

Goffs Oak Ward Result 3 May 1990
Party	Candidate	Votes	%	±%
Conservative	Marie Dowsett	1,080	71.01	
Labour	Christopher Evans	254	16.70	
Liberal Democrats	Julian Gould	187	12.29	
Majority		826		
Turnout		1,521	43.70	
Conservative hold		Swing		

Hoddesdon North Ward Result 2 Seats 3 May 1990
Party	Candidate	Votes	%	±%
Conservative	Robert Groucott	1,218	29.63	
Conservative	Richard Kemp	1,182	28.75	
Labour	Jill Garrett	489	11.89	
Labour	Margaret Brinkley	488	11.87	
Liberal Democrats	Patricia Waughrey	391	9.51	
Liberal Democrats	Frank Bassill	343	8.35	
Turnout		4,111	44.90	
Conservative hold		Swing		
Conservative hold		Swing		

Hoddesdon Town Ward Result 3 May 1990
Party	Candidate	Votes	%	±%
Conservative	Michael Lavender	1,057	48.64	
Labour	Gillian Harvey	546	25.13	
Liberal Democrats	Anthony Fey	462	21.26	
Green	James Harbord	108	4.97	
Majority		511		
Turnout		2,173	45.50	
Conservative hold		Swing		

Rosedale Ward Result 3 May 1990
Party	Candidate	Votes	%	±%
Liberal Democrats	Trevor Griffiths	541	42.30	
Conservative	Alan Chowne	371	29.01	
Labour	Simon Elliott	367	28.69	
Majority		170		
Turnout		1,279	45.90	
Liberal Democrats hold		Swing		

Rye Park Ward Result 3 May 1990
Party	Candidate	Votes	%	±%
Labour	Arthur Hillyard	1,094	52.62	
Conservative	Trevor Simpson	713	34.30	
Liberal Democrats	Sheila Guy	272	13.08	
Majority		381		
Turnout		2,079	45.70	
Labour hold		Swing		

Theobalds Ward Result 3 May 1990
Party	Candidate	Votes	%	±%
Conservative	Patricia Morris	829	45.82	
Labour	Julia Theobald	702	38.81	
Liberal Democrats	Kathleen Jolly	278	15.37	
Majority		127		
Turnout		1,809	43.20	
Conservative hold		Swing		

Waltham Cross North Ward Result 3 May 1990
Party	Candidate	Votes	%	±%
Conservative	Norman Ames	759	50.56	
Labour	Malcolm Theobald	596	39.71	
Liberal Democrats	Anthony Stokes	146	9.73	
Majority		163		
Turnout		1,501	49.70	
Conservative hold		Swing		

Waltham Cross South Ward Result 3 May 1990
Party	Candidate	Votes	%	±%
Labour	Lester Hickling	1,056	55.29	
Conservative	Andrew Ferguson	599	31.36	
Liberal Democrats	Paul Seeby	255	13.35	
Majority		457		
Turnout		1,910	46.20	
Labour hold		Swing		

Wormley / Turnford Ward Result 3 May 1990
Party	Candidate	Votes	%	±%
Conservative	Brian Hill	803	52.02	
Labour	Sarah Tadman	525	33.35	
Liberal Democrats	James Emslie	246	15.63	
Majority		278		
Turnout		1,574	34.00	
Conservative hold		Swing		
