= 1988 Solihull Metropolitan Borough Council election =

1988 council elections in England

(1987 ←) 1988 United Kingdom local elections (→ 1990)

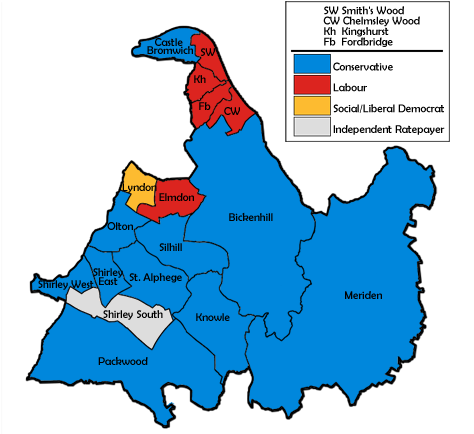
Map of the results for the 1988 Solihull council election.

The 1988 Solihull Metropolitan Borough Council elections were held on Thursday, 5 May 1988, with one third of the council to be elected. Prior to the election, Packwood councillor, Kenneth Meeson, had defected from Independent to the Conservatives. The Conservatives retained control of the council.

== Election result ==
Solihull local election result 1988
Party	Seats	Gains	Losses	Net gain/loss	Seats %	Votes %	Votes	+/−
Conservative	10	1	2	-1	58.8	51.9	29,904	+0.9
Labour	5	1	1	0	20.4	26.3	15,165	+8.4
SLD	1	1	0	+1	5.9	15.6	8,987	-7.2
Independent Ratepayers & Residents	1	0	0	0	5.9	6.1	3,539	-2.0

This result had the following consequences for the total number of seats on the council after the elections:

Party	Previous council	New council
Conservatives	30	29
Labour	14	14
Independent Ratepayers & Residents	4	4
Social and Liberal Democrats	3	4
Total	51	51
Working majority	9	7

== Ward results ==
Bickenhill
Party	Candidate	Votes	%	±%
Conservative	Graham Juniper	2,246	54.2	−0.8
Labour	Sheila Brookes	1,519	36.7	+8.3
SLD	David Moore	376	9.1	−7.5
Majority		727	17.6	−9.1
Turnout		4,141		
Conservative gain from Labour		Swing	-4.5	

Castle Bromwich
Party	Candidate	Votes	%	±%
Conservative	George Richards	2,831	67.7	+3.2
Labour	Jeffrey Potts	1,078	25.8	+8.7
SLD	Paul Rivers	271	6.5	−12.0
Majority		1,753	41.9	−4.1
Turnout		4,180		
Conservative hold		Swing	-2.7	

Chelmsley Wood
Party	Candidate	Votes	%	±%
Labour	Alfred Hill	1,683	68.5	+17.1
Conservative	Robin Draycott	581	23.7	−4.1
SLD	Petula Holmes	191	7.8	−10.8
Majority		1,102	44.9	+21.2
Turnout		2,455		
Labour hold		Swing	+10.6	

Elmdon
Party	Candidate	Votes	%	±%
Labour	Rona Miller	1,729	45.9	+14.1
Conservative	Norman Page	1,690	44.8	−4.0
SLD	Richard Blight	349	9.3	−10.1
Majority		39	1.0	−16.1
Turnout		3,768		
Labour gain from Conservative		Swing	+9.0	

Fordbridge
Party	Candidate	Votes	%	±%
Labour	Michael Corser	1,403	73.1	+20.5
Conservative	Neil Archer	515	26.8	−2.6
Majority		888	46.3	+23.1
Turnout		1,918		
Labour hold		Swing	+11.5	

Kingshurst
Party	Candidate	Votes	%	±%
Labour	Frederick Allen	1,503	68.0	+15.4
Conservative	Dorothy Wallace	708	32.0	−0.5
Majority		795	36.0	+16.0
Turnout		2,211		
Labour hold		Swing	+7.9	

Knowle
Party	Candidate	Votes	%	±%
Conservative	Ronald Scannell	2,341	72.4	+5.8
SLD	Bernadette Pruden	570	17.6	−11.3
Labour	Christine Horton	322	10.0	+5.5
Majority		1,771	54.8	+17.1
Turnout		3,233		
Conservative hold		Swing	+8.5	

Lyndon
Party	Candidate	Votes	%	±%
SLD	Richard Balmer	1,550	43.2	−0.3
Conservative	Peter Duddy	1,417	39.5	−2.3
Labour	Walter Kinder	622	17.3	+2.6
Majority		133	3.7	+2.0
Turnout		3,589		
SLD gain from Conservative		Swing	+1.0	

Meriden
Party	Candidate	Votes	%	±%
Conservative	Alan Vincent	1,813	59.5	+2.7
Alliance (SDP)	John Johnson	969	31.8	−7.2
Labour	Robert Overton	263	8.6	+4.5
Majority		844	27.7	+9.9
Turnout		3,045		
Conservative hold		Swing	+4.9	

Olton
Party	Candidate	Votes	%	±%
Conservative	Diana Holl-Allen	2,186	55.5	+1.2
SLD	Timothy Farzmand	1,419	36.0	−3.6
Labour	Hugh Hendry	333	8.5	+2.4
Majority		767	19.5	+4.9
Turnout		3,938		
Conservative hold		Swing	+2.4	

Packwood
Party	Candidate	Votes	%	±%
Conservative	Kenneth Meeson	2,389	62.6	+14.8
SLD	Arthur Crossley	1,193	31.3	+31.3
Labour	Maurice Jones	234	6.1	+1.6
Majority		1,196	31.3	+31.1
Turnout		3,816		
Conservative hold		Swing	-8.2	

Shirley East
Party	Candidate	Votes	%	±%
Conservative	Frank Morris	1,738	51.9	+2.4
Independent Ratepayers	Richard Jackson	1,124	33.6	+13.2
Labour	Derek Jones	486	14.5	+5.8
Majority		614	18.3	−9.7
Turnout		3,348		
Conservative hold		Swing	-5.4	

Shirley South
Party	Candidate	Votes	%	±%
Independent Ratepayers	Ursula Eames	2,415	53.6	+5.7
Conservative	Theresa Samuels	1,696	37.6	−6.4
Labour	Georgina Parisi	397	8.8	+0.7
Majority		719	15.9	+12.0
Turnout		4,508		
Independent Ratepayers hold		Swing	+6.0	

Shirley West
Party	Candidate	Votes	%	±%
Conservative	Miriam Harris	1,671	53.2	−1.0
SLD	John Reeve	786	25.0	−9.1
Labour	Margaret Brittin	685	21.8	+10.1
Majority		885	28.2	+8.1
Turnout		3,142		
Conservative hold		Swing	-4.0	

Silhill
Party	Candidate	Votes	%	±%
Conservative	Peter Hogarth	2,572	68.3	+7.9
SLD	Jennifer Wright	697	18.5	−12.6
Labour	Graham Craig	496	13.2	+4.7
Majority		1,875	49.8	+20.5
Turnout		3,765		
Conservative hold		Swing	+10.2	

Smith's Wood
Party	Candidate	Votes	%	±%
Labour	Derrick Harrison	2,155	75.3	+23.8
Conservative	Mark Saunders	707	24.7	−2.8
Majority		1,448	50.6	+26.7
Turnout		2,862		
Labour hold		Swing	+13.3	

St. Alphege
Party	Candidate	Votes	%	±%
Conservative	John Taylor	2,803	76.2	+4.1
SLD	Bernard Winchombe	616	16.8	−7.8
Labour	Thomas Hayes	257	7.0	+3.7
Majority		2,187	59.5	+11.9
Turnout		3,676		
Conservative hold		Swing	+6.0	

== By-elections between 1988 and 1990 ==
Shirley East by-election 2 February 1989
Party	Candidate	Votes	%	±%
SLD	John Reeve	1,127	51.4	+51.4
Conservative	Theresa Samuels	799	36.4	−15.5
Labour	Philip Knowles	228	10.4	−4.1
National Front	Norman Tomkinson	38	1.7	+1.7
Majority		328	15.0	−3.3
Turnout		2,192		
SLD gain from Conservative		Swing	-5.4	

Smith's Wood by-election 2 March 1989
Party	Candidate	Votes	%	±%
Labour	Graham Craig	957	74.7	−0.6
Conservative	Peter Llewellyn	276	21.5	−3.2
Green	Paul Adams	48	3.7	+3.7
Majority		681	53.2	+2.6
Turnout		1,281		
Labour hold		Swing	+1.3	

Packwood by-election April 1989
Party	Candidate	Votes	%	±%
SLD	Judy Morris	1,897	54.1	+22.8
Conservative	Stephen Bishop	1,455	41.5	−21.1
Labour	Jeffrey Potts	155	4.4	−1.7
Majority		1,196	31.3	+31.1
Turnout		3,507		
Social and Liberal Democrats gain from Independent Residents		Swing	+21.9	
