= 1990 Wolverhampton Metropolitan Borough Council election =

1990 UK local government election

The 1990 Council elections held in Wolverhampton on Thursday 3 May 1990 were one third, and 20 of the 60 seats were up for election.

During the 1990 election the Conservative Party gained Tettenhall Regis from a Liberal candidate.

1990 saw a huge decline in candidates from the rump SDP and Liberal Party, with only 1 from each standing. The Liberal Democrats contested most of the remaining wards. The Labour Party retained its majority and control of the council.

Prior to the election the constitution of the council was:

- Conservative 23
- Labour 31
- Lib Dem 5
- Other 1

Following the election the constitution of the council was:

- Conservative 24
- Labour 31
- Lib Dem 5

== Ward results ==
Bilston East
Party	Candidate	Votes	%	±%
Labour	N Davies	2430		
Conservative	J Davies	964		
Liberal Democrats	A Ramsbottom	289		
Majority		1466		

Bilston North
Party	Candidate	Votes	%	±%
Labour	Mrs T Bowen	2861		
Conservative	B Hooper	1787		
Liberal Democrats	R Wedge	410		
Majority		1074		

Blakenhall
Party	Candidate	Votes	%	±%
Labour	J Rowley	2906		
Conservative	M Norton	1505		
Liberal Democrats	M O'Brien	286		
Majority		1401		

Bushbury
Party	Candidate	Votes	%	±%
Conservative	G Patten	2591		
Labour	P Hamid	1767		
Liberal Democrats	I Jenkins	627		
Majority		824		

East Park
Party	Candidate	Votes	%	±%
Labour	G Howells	2726		
Conservative	M K Bailey	1108		
Liberal Democrats	A Whitehouse	394		
Majority		1618		

Ettingshall
Party	Candidate	Votes	%	±%
Labour	J Shelley	2654		
Conservative	J Humphreys	905		
Liberal Democrats	T Kerr	264		
Majority		1749		

Fallings Park
Party	Candidate	Votes	%	±%
Labour	Mrs J Hill	2243		
Conservative	A Murray	1935		
Liberal Democrats	S Birch	286		
Wolves	G Dawidow	143		
SDP	D Fysh	105		
Majority		308		

Graiseley
Party	Candidate	Votes	%	±%
Labour	F Ledsam	2711		
Conservative	L Phelps	1859		
Liberal Democrats	W M Beard	330		
Wolves	N Frisby	141		
Majority		857		

Heath Town
Party	Candidate	Votes	%	±%
Labour	A Garner	2262		
Conservative	A Dawson	854		
Liberal	A A C Bourke	786		
Majority		1408		

Low Hill
Party	Candidate	Votes	%	±%
Labour	Peter Bilson	2859		
Conservative	A Lort	1123		
Majority		1736		

Merry Hill
Party	Candidate	Votes	%	±%
Conservative	B Clarke	2981		
Labour	S Smith	1587		
Liberal Democrats	J White	457		
Majority		1394		

Oxley
Party	Candidate	Votes	%	±%
Labour	K Clifford	2220		
Conservative	K Pederson	1941		
Liberal Democrats	A Jenkins	340		
Green	P Yates	204		
Majority				

Park
Party	Candidate	Votes	%	±%
Conservative	M Griffiths	2895		
Labour	R Garner	2087		
Liberal Democrats	B Lewis	449		
Green	A Squire	261		
Majority		808		

Penn
Party	Candidate	Votes	%	±%
Conservative	J Carpenter	3374		
Labour	P Bhutta	1157		
Liberal Democrats	C Jones-Williams	715		
Majority		2217		

St Peter's
Party	Candidate	Votes	%	±%
Labour	T Singh	2948		
Conservative	A Chathli	690		
Green	F Bastin	355		
Liberal Democrats	G Ellam	348		
Majority		2258		

Spring Vale
Party	Candidate	Votes	%	±%
Liberal Democrats	Malcolm Gwinnett	2331		
Labour	B Holmes	2272		
Conservative	J Lenoir	1017		
Majority		59		

Tettenhall Regis
Party	Candidate	Votes	%	±%
Conservative	B Ward	2535		
Liberal Democrats	L McLean	1565		
Labour	L Turner	947		
Green	A Dickinson-Flint	164		
Majority		970		

Tettenhall Wightwick
Party	Candidate	Votes	%	±%
Conservative	R Williams	3587		
Labour	F Docherty	1084		
Liberal Democrats	M Rowen	277		
Green	J Raven	252		
Majority		2503		

Wednesfield North
Party	Candidate	Votes	%	±%
Labour	G Walton	2476		
Conservative	G Clark	1897		
Liberal Democrats	M A Pearson	935		
Majority		579		

Wednesfield South
Party	Candidate	Votes	%	±%
Labour	R Thompson	2161		
Conservative	F Haley	1940		
Liberal Democrats	D Iles	501		
Majority		221		
