= 1990 Gloucester City Council election =

UK local election

The 1990 Gloucester City Council election took place on 1 May 1990 to elect members of Gloucester City Council in England.

== Results ==
Gloucester City Council election, 1990
Party	Seats	Gains	Losses	Net gain/loss	Seats %	Votes %	Votes	+/−
Labour	14				42.4			
Conservative	11				33.3			
Liberal Democrats	7				21.2			
Other	1				3.0			

== Ward results ==
=== Barnwood ===
Barnwood 1990
Party	Candidate	Votes	%	±%
Labour	Ms. E Hedge	2,519	52.6	
Conservative	N. Ravenhill	1,732	36.2	
Liberal Democrats	Ms. V. Wilcox	539	11.3	
Turnout		4,790	48.5	
Labour gain from Conservative		Swing		

=== Barton ===
Barton 1990
Party	Candidate	Votes	%	±%
Labour	A. Workman	1,744	74.2	
Conservative	D. Kelley	357	15.2	
Liberal Democrats	Ms. A. Gribble	248	10.6	
Turnout		2,349	43.9	
Labour hold		Swing		

=== Eastgate ===
Eastgate 1990
Party	Candidate	Votes	%	±%
Labour	D. Duncan	1,775	66.1	
Conservative	L. Proctor	546	20.3	
Liberal Democrats	Ms. C. McNair	366	13.6	
Turnout		2,687	47.8	
Labour hold		Swing		

=== Hucclecote ===
Hucclecote 1990
Party	Candidate	Votes	%	±%
Conservative	Ms. E. Marshall	1,444	37.6	
Liberal Democrats	G. Phillips	1,355	35.2	
Labour	Ms. K. Mills	1,046	27.2	
Turnout		3,845	54.4	
Conservative hold		Swing		

=== Kingsholm ===
Kingsholm 1990
Party	Candidate	Votes	%	±%
Liberal Democrats	J. Hilton	1,636	47.1	
Conservative	P. Arnold	1,079	31.0	
Labour	D. Hitchings	592	17.0	
Green	T. Vidgen	169	4.9	
Turnout		3,476	56.4	
Liberal Democrats hold		Swing		

=== Linden ===
Linden 1990
Party	Candidate	Votes	%	±%
Other	A. Gilberthorpe	1,583	47.9	
Labour	Ms. P. Judge	1,265	38.3	
Conservative	M. Greenhalgh	350	10.6	
Liberal Democrats	A. Gribble	104	3.1	
Turnout		3,302	60.1	
Other gain from Conservative				

=== Longlevens ===
Longlevens 1990
Party	Candidate	Votes	%	±%
Labour	B. Richards	1,472	37.9	
Conservative	P.* Grant-Hudson	1,306	33.7	
Liberal Democrats	Ms. V. Phillips	862	22.2	
Green	M. Brickell	239	6.2	
Turnout		3,879	60.9	
Labour hold		Swing		

=== Matson ===
Matson 1990
Party	Candidate	Votes	%	±%
Labour	A.* Potts	1,783	70.2	
Conservative	B. Turner	442	17.4	
Liberal Democrats	M. Vaughan	316	12.4	
Turnout		2,541	43.1	
Labour hold		Swing		

=== Tuffley ===
Moreland 1990
Party	Candidate	Votes	%	±%
Labour	N. Durrant	1,436	45.4	
Conservative	J. Phillips	1,166	36.9	
Liberal Democrats	S. O'Connor	558	17.7	
Turnout		3,260	50.8	
Labour hold		Swing		

=== Westgate ===
Westgate 1990
Party	Candidate	Votes	%	±%
Liberal Democrats	R.* Welshman	1,285	53.8	
Conservative	R. Hubble	556	23.3	
Labour	Ms. G. Gillespie	548	22.9	
Turnout		2,389	46.2	
Liberal Democrats hold		Swing		
