= David Jamieson (British politician) =

British politician (born 1947)

West Midlands Police and Crime Commissioner
- In office 22 August 2014 – 12 May 2021
- Deputy: Yvonne Mosquito; Ashley Bertie; Waheed Saleem
- Preceded by: Bob Jones
- Succeeded by: Simon Foster

Parliamentary Under-Secretary of State for Transport
- In office 11 June 2001 – 10 May 2005
- Prime Minister: Tony Blair
- Preceded by: Keith Hill
- Succeeded by: Karen Buck

Lord Commissioner of the Treasury
- In office 28 July 1998 – 11 June 2001
- Prime Minister: Tony Blair
- Preceded by: Jon Owen Jones
- Succeeded by: Nick Ainger

Member of Parliament for Plymouth Devonport
- In office 10 April 1992 – 11 April 2005
- Preceded by: David Owen
- Succeeded by: Alison Seabeck

Personal details
- Born: David Charles Jamieson; 18 May 1947 (age 79) Solihull, England
- Party: Labour

David Charles Jamieson (born 18 May 1947) is a British politician who served as the West Midlands Police and Crime Commissioner from 2014 to 2021. A member of the Labour Party, he was previously the Member of Parliament (MP) for Plymouth Devonport from 1992 to 2005 and a Solihull Metropolitan Borough Councillor from 2010 to 2014.

== Early life and career ==
Born in Solihull, England, he was educated at Tudor Grange Grammar school, and later at St Peter's College, Saltley, Birmingham.

Before becoming an MP, he was a teacher at Riland Bedford School and later a head of Mathematics at Crown Hills Community College between 1970 and 1981, before becoming the senior vice principal of the John Kitto Community College in Plymouth (1981–1992).

== Political career ==
=== Early career ===
Jamieson was elected to the County Borough of Solihull Council for the Lyndon ward at a by-election in July 1970, having been an unsuccessful candidate in the elections in May of that year. He stood for the same ward in 1973 when elections for the new Metropolitan Borough of Solihull was established but the three Conservative candidates were all narrowly elected.

Jamieson first stood for Parliament, unsuccessfully, for Birmingham Hall Green in February 1974, losing to Conservative incumbent Reginald Eyre by 21,036 votes (43.5%) to 27,280 (56.5%). He was then the Labour Party candidate for Plymouth Drake in 1987, gaining 9,451 votes (24%) and coming third, behind SDP–Liberal Alliance candidate David Astor and the incumbent Conservative MP, Janet Fookes.

=== Member of Parliament ===
He then stood for Plymouth Devonport in the 1992 general election and was successful, defeating Conservative candidate Keith Simpson by 24,953 votes (48.7%) to 17,541 votes (34.3%).

After the Lyme Bay canoeing tragedy, in which four Southway Community College pupils died on a canoeing expedition with the St Albans Challenge Centre in Lyme Bay, Dorset, in 1993, he guided a private member's bill through the House of Commons which became the Activity Centres (Young Persons Safety) Act 1995; the Adventure Activities Licensing Authority was established in January 1995 to implement the new law.

He was re-elected in 1997 with 31,629 votes (60.9%) and was appointed a government whip. After being re-elected in 2001 with 24,322 votes (58.3%), he was appointed the Parliamentary Under-Secretary in the Department for Transport, with responsibility for shipping, rail and aviation. He remained there until leaving office on 10 May 2005.

He chose to step down at the 2005 general election, saying that he had achieved all he set out to and likened his departure to a chapter in a book coming to a natural end. He also felt that the Mackay Vision would be best served by a new MP taking it forward. He was succeeded by Labour candidate Alison Seabeck.

After leaving the House of Commons, Jamieson worked as a consultant for Golden Arrow Communications, which represented transport companies such as Hutchinson Ports, National Express and GNER.

=== Local councillor ===
Jamieson was elected to Solihull Metropolitan Borough Council on 7 May 2010 representing the Kingshurst & Fordbridge ward in the north of the Borough, and was promoted to hold the Cabinet portfolio for Transport and Highways following the formation of a Liberal Democrat-Labour coalition administration on the authority on 25 May 2010.

He subsequently became leader of the Labour group on the council, but in the May 2014 elections, he lost his seat to UK Independence Party candidate Debbie Evans. He polled 713 votes to her 1,022. Speaking to the Solihull Observer, he said, "I will now enjoy retirement. I have already retired once but this time I mean it. Before I stood in this election I said that this would be the last time I stand."

=== Police and Crime Commissioner ===
In June 2014 he indicated he was a candidate for the vacancy of West Midlands Police and Crime Commissioner; on 14 July, the selection panel chose him as the official Labour Party candidate. The vacancy was caused by the death of the incumbent, Bob Jones, formerly a Labour councillor from Wolverhampton.

The election was held on 21 August 2014 and Jamieson was declared the winner with 50.8% of the vote. Shortly afterwards, he was sworn in and confirmed that Yvonne Mosquito, the Acting PCC, and Jones' deputy, would be his deputy.

His first pledge after being elected was to find the money to reactivate all of the West Midlands' speed cameras, and he said that his top priorities were recruiting more police officers, improving neighbourhood policing and reducing the number of fatalities and injuries on the region's roads.

Jamieson was re-elected in 2016. After narrowly missing out on victory with 49.8% of the vote in the first round, he won 63.3% in the second round against the Conservative candidate.

Jamieson did not run for re-election in the elections in 2021.

Parliament of the United Kingdom
Preceded by Dr David Owen	Member of Parliament for Plymouth Devonport; 1992–2005	Succeeded by Alison Seabeck
