= Corporate manslaughter =

Culpable conduct within a company that leads to a person's death

Corporate manslaughter is a crime in several jurisdictions, including England and Wales and Hong Kong. It enables a corporation to be punished and censured for culpable conduct that leads to a person's death. This extends beyond any compensation that might be awarded in civil litigation or any criminal prosecution of an individual (including an employee or contractor). The Corporate Manslaughter and Corporate Homicide Act 2007 came into effect in the UK on 6 April 2008.

== Theory ==
Clarkson identifies six theories of corporate manslaughter:

- Identification doctrine;
- Aggregation doctrine;
- Reactive corporate fault;
- Vicarious liability;
- Management failure model; and
- Corporate mens rea.

=== Identification doctrine ===
This approach holds that the offence of corporate manslaughter is made out when an individual commits all the elements of the offence of manslaughter and that person is sufficiently senior to be seen as the controlling mind of the corporation. Prior to the Corporate Manslaughter and Corporate Homicide Act 2007, this was how the law applied in England and Wales.

=== Aggregation doctrine ===
This approach, known in the U.S. as the collective knowledge doctrine, aggregates all the acts and mental elements of various company employees and finds the offence if all the elements of manslaughter are made out, though not necessarily within a single controlling mind. This approach is used in the U.S. but has been rejected in England and Wales.

=== Reactive corporate fault ===
This idea was proposed by Fisse and Braithwaite. They proposed that where an individual had committed the actus reus of manslaughter, a court should have the power to order the employing corporation to institute measures to prevent further recurrence and should face criminal prosecution should they fail to do so.

=== Vicarious liability ===
The broader principle of vicarious liability (respondeat superior in the U.S.) is often invoked to establish corporate manslaughter. In the U.S., where an employee commits a crime within the sphere of his employment and with the intention of benefiting the corporation, his criminality can be imputed to the company. The principle has sometimes been used in England and Wales for strict liability offences concerning regulatory matters, but the exact law is unclear.

=== Management failure model ===
This is the approach to be taken under the Corporate Manslaughter and Corporate Homicide Act 2007, which came into force in the UK in April 2008. Where a corporation's activities cause a person's death and the failure was because of a breach that falls far below what can reasonably be expected of the organisation in the circumstances, the offence is made out.

=== Corporate mens rea ===
A further approach is to accept the legal fiction of corporate personality and to extend it to the possibility of a corporate mens rea, to be found in corporate practices and policies. This approach has been widely advocated in the U.S., as the corporate ethos standard and introduced in Australia in 1995.

== Support and criticism of the concept ==
Clarkson identifies four valuable characteristics of criminal prosecution:

- Stronger procedural protection of corporations, such as proof beyond reasonable doubt;
- More powerful enforcement agencies, such as the Health and Safety Executive in the UK;
- The stigma and censure that follow from conviction; and
- The symbolic role of criminal law is that "sends a message" to society.

However, the existence of such a crime has been criticised, especially from the point of view of law and economics, which argues that civil damages are a more appropriate means of compensation, recognition of the loss suffered and deterrence. Such arguments emphasise that, because the civil courts award compensation commensurate with the damage done, they apply the appropriate level of deterrence.

... pursuing corporate criminal liability results in society bearing the higher sanctioning costs of stigma penalties and the increased costs of deterring corporate misbehaviour created by the procedural protections of criminal law.

— Khanna (1996) p.1533

Again, such arguments contend that "over-deterrence" may divert resources from other socially beneficial activities.

... when the penalty exceeds the social harm, the problem of socially excessive product prices and litigation costs again arises.

— Fischel & Sykes (1996), p.325

A further strand of criticism holds that only individuals can commit crimes. Further, it is individuals who feel the threat of deterrence. In England in 1994, OLL Ltd. were convicted of corporate manslaughter over the Lyme Bay kayaking tragedy and fined £60,000, while Peter Kite, one of the company's directors, was sentenced to three years' imprisonment, arguably a greater influence on the conduct of company managers. Further, a corporation may simply be a "veil" for an individual's activities, easily liquidated and with no reputation to protect. Again, it is argued that company fines ultimately punish shareholders, customers and employees in general, rather than culpable managers.

== By jurisdiction ==
=== United Kingdom ===
- Corporate manslaughter (England and Wales)

=== Australia ===
Several states and territories recognise the crime of Industrial manslaughter. The Australian Capital Territory has provisions for industrial manslaughter introduced in 2004. In 2017, industrial manslaughter became an offence in Queensland in their workplace health and safety legislation, the Work Health and Safety Act 2011. Despite the offence existing in four jurisdictions as of 2020, there have been no successful prosecutions.

In New South Wales on 16 September 2024, the crime of Industrial Manslaughter came into effect following the passage of the Work Health and Safety Amendment (Industrial Manslaughter) Act 2024 earlier that year. Provisions for industrial manslaughter were demanded by the trade union movement after the adolescent building industry worker Joel Exter fell off a domestic roof and died. Joel's union, the CFMEU, conducted a significant campaign around his death. The Labor Party (ALP) government of NSW under Bob Carr denied that industrial manslaughter provisions were necessary as Workcover already has provisions for dealing with industrial death. The trade union movement argued that the manslaughter provisions of Workcover were ineffective, as reflected by a lack of prosecution of employers for workplace death.

The Victorian Parliament passed the Workplace Safety Legislation Amendment (Workplace Manslaughter and other matters) Bill 2019 on 26 November 2019 and is expected to come into effect on a day to be proclaimed or, at the latest, 1 July 2020.

=== Canada ===
In Canada, Bill C-45 was enacted as a response to the Westray Mine explosion that killed twenty-six miners in 1992. The Bill added a new section to the Canadian Criminal Code ("217.1 Every one who undertakes, or has the authority, to direct how another person does work or performs a task is under a legal duty to take reasonable steps to prevent bodily harm to that person, or any other person, arising from that work or task.") and adds sections 22.1 and 22.2 to the Criminal Code to impose criminal liability on organizations for negligence (s. 22.1) and other offences (s. 22.2).

=== New Zealand ===
In 2012, proposals were put forward in the New Zealand Parliament for a corporate manslaughter statute, in the wake of the CTV building collapse during the 2011 Canterbury earthquake, and the Pike River Mine disaster. As of March 2015, Labour Party leader Andrew Little had a private member's bill in the ballot that would, if passed, add a charge of corporate manslaughter to the Crimes Act 1961.

=== United States ===
In the U.S., there is currently no corporate manslaughter law. However, there have been numerous calls in the literature for a "corporate death penalty". A 2019 study argued that industries that kill more people each year than they employ should have an industry-wide corporate death penalty.

== See also ==
- Corporate crime
- Judicial dissolution
- Capital punishment

== Bibliography ==
- Clarkson, C. M. V. (1996). "Kicking corporate bodies and damning their souls". Modern Law Review. 59 (4): 557–572. doi:10.1111/j.1468-2230.1966.tb02098.x.
- Clarkson, C. M. V. (1998). "Corporate culpability". Web Journal of Current Legal Issues. 2.
- Coffee, J (1981). "'No soul to damn, no body to kick': an unscandalized inquiry into the problem of corporate punishment". Michigan Law Review. 79 (3). Michigan Law Review, Vol. 79, No. 3: 386–459. doi:10.2307/1288201. JSTOR 1288201.
- Fischel, D. R.; Sykes, A. O. (1996). "Corporate crime". Journal of Legal Studies. 25 (2): 319. doi:10.1086/467980. S2CID 222327935.
- Fisse, B. (1983). "Restructuring corporate criminal law: deterrence, retribution, fault and sanctions". Southern California Law Review. 56: 1141.
- Fisse, B. & Braithwaite, J. (1988). "The allocation of responsibility for corporate crime: individualism, collectivism and accountability". Sydney Law Review. 11: 468.
- Fisse, B. (1994). Corporations, Crime and Accountability. London: Cambridge University Press. ISBN 0-521-45923-0.
- Glazebrook, P. (2002). "A better way of convicting businesses of avoiding deaths and injuries". Cambridge Law Journal. 61 (2): 405. doi:10.1017/S0008197302001678.
- Gobert, J. (2002). "Corporate killings at home and abroad - reflections on the government's proposals". Law Quarterly Review. 118: 72.
- — & Punch, M. (2003). Rethinking Corporate Crime. London: Butterworths LexisNexis. pp. 35–39. ISBN 0-406-95006-7.
- Huff, K. B. (1996). "The role of corporate compliance programmes in determining corporate criminal liability: a suggested approach". Columbia Law Review. 96 (5). Columbia Law Review, Vol. 96, No. 5: 1252–1298. doi:10.2307/1123405. JSTOR 1123405.
- Khanna, V. S. (1996). "Corporate criminal liability: What purpose does it serve?". Harvard Law Review. 109 (7). Harvard Law Review, Vol. 109, No. 7: 1477–1534. doi:10.2307/1342023. JSTOR 1342023.
- Ragozino, A. (1995). "Replacing the collective knowledge doctrine with a better theory for establishing corporate mens rea: the duty stratification approach". Southwestern University Law Review. 24: 423.
- Rose, A. (1995). "The 1995 Australian Criminal Code Act: corporate criminal provisions". Criminal Law Forum. 6: 129–142. doi:10.1007/BF01095724. S2CID 144033524.
- Sullivan, G. R. (1996). "The attribution of culpability to limited companies". Cambridge Law Journal. 55 (3): 515–546. doi:10.1017/S0008197300100492. S2CID 145799285.
- Sullivan, G. R. (2001). "Corporate killing - some government proposals". Criminal Law Review: 31.
- Wells, C. (1993). "Corporations: culture, risk and criminal liability". Criminal Law Review: 551.
- Wells, C. (2001). Corporations and Criminal Responsibility (2nd ed.). Oxford: Oxford University Press. pp. 154–160. ISBN 0-19-924619-X.
