= AALA =

AALA may refer to:

- Adventure Activities Licensing Authority in the UK
- American Agricultural Law Association
- Australia-Asia Literary Award
- The Los Angeles division of the recovery group Alcoholics Anonymous
