= Southway Community College =

Location
- Rockfield Avenue; Plymouth, Devon, PL6 6DY
- Coordinates: 50.428506°N 4.132969°W

Information
- Type: Comprehensive school
- Established: 1962
- Closed: 2001
- Gender: Mixed
- Age: 11 to 18

Southway Community College was a comprehensive school for ages 11–18 in Southway, Plymouth, England. It was opened in 1962 as Southway Comprehensive School, becoming a community college offering additional adult education in 1994. Its feeder primary schools included Langley Junior School, Mary Dean's CE Primary School, Southway Primary School and Tamerton Vale Primary School. The school closed in July 2001, largely as a result of falling student numbers. This was a decision that was opposed by many students, teachers and parents. It later became the site of Beechwood Primary School. In 1993, four students from the school were killed in a kayaking accident during a school trip to an adventure centre in Lyme Regis, Dorset.

== History ==
=== Early history ===
The school opened in 1962 as Southway Comprehensive School, with 140 pupils. The first headmaster was Peter Bindschedler from Switzerland. Bindschedler influenced much of the early development of the school, including the creation of the motto and the design of the school uniform. Bindschedler remained at the school until 1981, overseeing the growth of the institution to one of the biggest schools in Plymouth, with 1,850 students. During this time, the name was changed to Southway School.

=== 1990–2000 ===
On 22 March 1993, four students died while kayaking in Lyme Bay on a school trip, led by instructors from a local activity centre. The pupils were aged 16 and 17. The company that owned the activity centre were prosecuted for corporate manslaughter, and the activity centre manager was given a prison sentence. This was the first time in the UK that a company had been successfully prosecuted for corporate manslaughter. The incident also led to changes in the legislation concerning outdoor activities for schoolchildren, including the establishment of the Adventure Activities Licensing Authority in 1995. A memorial garden was planted at the school in remembrance of the pupils.

In 1994, the school became a community college and began to offer courses for adults. Academic standards improved in the years that followed: the percentage of pupils passing five or more GCSE exams rose from 82% in 1996 to 93% in 2000 and the percentage of candidates achieving five or more A*-C grades increased from 16% to 27%. However, the number of students attending the school declined during the 1990s. As a result of this, and the fact that standards at the school were not improving as quickly as the council desired, the college was placed on a list of "schools causing concern" in July 2000.

A£1 million building scheme was started in July 2000, which included the construction of a new technology block and computer suite, the extension of the library and the refurbishment of the sports hall, as well as the removal of some unused buildings.

=== Closure ===
In March 2001, Plymouth City Council announced plans to close the school by the end of the following academic year, as part of a wider reorganisation of education provision in the city. Falling attendance was the main reason for this announcement; the school had around 500 pupils at this point, and only had an expected September intake of 50. The school was also operating at a financial deficit of £100,000 per annum, which was expected to rise to almost £500,000 within three years. The council still expected to provide an educational facility on the site of the college, and the refurbishment plan continued.

The initial proposal was for the college to be taken over by Sir John Hunt Community College, which would then be split between this Southway campus and its current site in Whitleigh, with a sixth form centre being constructed on the Southway site. Governors at Sir John Hunt, however, expressed dissatisfaction with this proposal to have the college split across two campuses; in their view, such a solution could only be a temporary measure before a full move to the college site in Whitleigh. After the start of the public consultation, the proposal was changed to mean the complete closure of the Southway school and the transferral of pupils to Sir John Hunt Community College, which would be enlarged to cope with the increased numbers.

The proposal elicited a strong public reaction from the local community. The first public meeting in April 2001 was attended by 1000 people and, according to a newspaper report, was "often out of control and ended in disarray". Some parents formed a protest group called "Students and Parents Against Closure" (SPAC) soon afterwards. This group placed posters around the Southway area, created a petition to present to the council, and organised an hour-long march through Southway in demonstration. Over 2000 people signed SPAC's petition, and three-quarters of the parents who responded to the council's consultation were against the proposal. Despite opposition, the plans to close the school were agreed by Plymouth City Council in June, and a formal notice of this decision was given the following month.

=== Later history ===
"It has been quiet here. You would finish a conversation in the corridor and then expect to hear someone else talking. But it was silent."

— Sarah Kennedy, one of the last students to leave the school in 2005.

Immediately after the school's closure, the site became a temporary separate campus of the Sir John Hunt Community College. No new pupils were admitted in this time, but the school remained open under the control of Sir John Hunt Community College while 250 current students completed their education up to GCSE level. In the 2004/05 academic year, only 75 students remained, and the campus closed completely in June 2005. These final students were given commemorative mugs, one side with the text "Southway Community College 2002 to 2003" and the other "John Kitto Community College 2003 to 2005".

While the final students were at the school, part of the campus began to be used as a training and development centre for Plymouth City Council. The council's use of the site continued until July 2010. In June 2010, the site became the home of Beechwood Primary School, an amalgamation of the former Southway and Tamerton Vale primary schools, which had been based at the former Southway Primary School site since September 2008. The memorial garden dedicated to the four students killed in the kayaking accident in 1993 was expanded in 2008, in response to the death of a pupil from Southway Primary School who was killed in a gas explosion.
