= Corporate Manslaughter and Corporate Homicide Act 2007 =

Public General Act of Parliament of the United Kingdom

Corporate Manslaughter and Corporate Homicide Act 2007 (Note: Section 29.)
- Act of Parliament
- Parliament of the United Kingdom
- Long title: An Act to create a new offence that, in England and Wales or Northern Ireland, is to be called corporate manslaughter and, in Scotland, is to be called corporate homicide; and to make provision in connection with that offence.
- Citation: 2007 c. 19
- Introduced by: John Reid MP, Home Secretary (Commons); Baroness Scotland of Asthal (Lords)
- Territorial extent: England and Wales; Scotland; Northern Ireland; (Note: Section 28.)

Dates
- Royal assent: 26 July 2007
- Commencement: Various (Note: Section 27.)
Other legislation
Amended by	Northern Ireland Act 1998 (Devolution of Policing and Justice Functions) Order 2010; Criminal Justice and Courts Act 2015

Status: Amended

History of passage through Parliament

Text of statute as originally enacted

Revised text of statute as amended

The Corporate Manslaughter and Corporate Homicide Act 2007 (c. 19) is an act of the Parliament of the United Kingdom that seeks to broaden the law on corporate manslaughter in the United Kingdom. The act created a new offence respectively named corporate manslaughter in England and Wales and Northern Ireland, and corporate homicide in Scotland.

The act received royal assent on 26 July 2007 and came into force on 6 April 2008.

== Background ==
In the United Kingdom, a corporation is considered a juristic person and can be capable of committing, being convicted of and sentenced for, a criminal offence. However, some conceptual difficulty lies in fixing a corporation with the appropriate mens rea. Before the Act, a corporation could only be convicted of manslaughter if a single employee of the company committed all the elements of the offence and was of sufficient seniority to be seen as embodying the "mind" of the corporation. The practical consequence of this was that such convictions were rare and there was public discontent where it was perceived that culpable corporations had escaped censure and punishment.

A Corporate Manslaughter and Corporate Homicide Bill was introduced to the House of Commons by Home Secretary John Reid on 20 July 2006.

== The act ==
=== The offence ===
The act attempts to align the offence of corporate killing north and south of the border. An indictable offence is committed if the way in which an organisation's activities are managed or organised:

- Causes a person's death; and
- Amounts to a gross breach of a relevant duty of care owed by the organisation to the deceased;

—and the way in which its activities are managed or organised by its senior management is a substantial element in the breach. Prosecution in England or Wales requires the permission of the Director of Public Prosecutions, and in Northern Ireland, the Director of Public Prosecutions for Northern Ireland and no natural person can be charged with aiding and abetting the offence. In Scotland, all prosecutions are initiated by a procurator fiscal. The common law offence of gross negligence manslaughter, as it applies to corporations, is abolished.

=== Organisations liable ===
The offence applies to:

- corporations;
- partnerships, trade unions and employers' associations, that are themselves employers.
- police forces;
- various, but not all, government departments.

=== Relevant duty of care ===
A relevant duty of care is one of several duties of care owed by the organisation under the law of negligence and is a question of law for the judge. Various government policy decisions; policing, military and child protection activities; and emergency responses are excluded.

There are particular duties of care owed to persons in custody (s. 2(1)(d)) and, owing to the sensitivity and difficulty of such duties, implementation of this section was delayed. The Ministry of Justice published a report on progress towards implementation in July 2008.

=== Gross breach ===
A breach of a duty of care by an organisation is a gross breach if the alleged conduct amounts to a breach of that duty that falls far below what can reasonably be expected of the organisation in the circumstances. The jury must consider whether the evidence shows that the organisation failed to comply with any health and safety legislation that relates to the alleged breach, and if so:

- how serious that failure was; and
- how much of a risk of death it posed.

The jury may also:

- consider the extent to which the evidence shows that there were attitudes, policies, systems or accepted practices within the organisation that were likely to have encouraged the failure, or to have produced tolerance of it; and
- have regard to any health and safety guidance that relates to the alleged breach.

=== Senior management ===
Senior management means the persons who play significant roles in:

- the making of decisions about how the whole or a substantial part of its activities are to be managed or organised; or
- the actual managing or organising of the whole or a substantial part of those activities.

== Penalties ==
On conviction a corporation may be ordered to remedy any breach, or to publicise its failures, or be given an unlimited fine. The Sentencing Council issued a steps based definitive guideline, effective from 1 February 2016, for sentencing the offence of corporate manslaughter. The recommendations of the guideline are based on the size and turnover of the organisations with a starting fine of £300,000 and a no limit maximum. If an individual is also found liable for the offence of manslaughter, it can be prosecuted under the Health and Safety at Work etc. Act 1974 ruled by the same sentencing guideline.

== Convictions ==
	Company name	Conviction date	Victim's name	Cause of death	Fine (plus costs)
1	Cotswold Geotechnical Holdings	15 February 2011	Alex Wright	Geologic trial pit collapse.	£385,000
2	JMW Farm Ltd	8 May 2012	Robert Wilson	Large metal bin fell off forklift and onto victim.	£187,500
3	Lion Steel Ltd	3 July 2012	Steven Berry	Fall through a factory roof.	£480,000
4	J Murray and Sons	7 October 2013	Norman Porter	Pulled into an animal feed mixing machine.	£100,000
5	Princes Sporting Club	22 November 2013	Mari-Simon Cronje	Eleven-year-old struck by speedboat.	£135,000
6	Mobile Sweepers (Reading) Ltd	2 December 2013	Malcolm Hinton	Crushed attempting to repair a street-sweeping truck.	£8,000
7	Cavendish Masonry Ltd	22 May 2014	David Evans	Builder crushed by a two-ton block of limestone.	£150,000
8	Sterecycle (Rotherham) Ltd	7 November 2014	Michael Whinfrey	Plant explosion.	£500,000
9	A Diamond and Son (Timber) Ltd	17 December 2014	Peter Lennon	Crushed while carrying out machinery maintenance.	£75,000
10	Peter Mawson Ltd	19 December 2014	Jason Pennington	Fell through a skylight while working on a roof.	£200,000
11	Pyranha Mouldings Ltd	12 January 2015	Alan Catterall	Accidentally locked inside industrial oven.	£200,000
12	Nicole Enterprises	12 March 2015	Thomas Houston	Crushed by a static caravan.	£100,000
13	Kings Scaffolding	28 April 2015	Adrian Smith	Fell through a skylight.	£300,000
14	Huntley Mount Engineering Ltd	14 July 2015	Cameron Minshull	Sixteen-year-old apprentice became entangled on a lathe.	£150,000
15	CAV Aerospace Ltd	24 July 2015	Paul Bowers	Crushed by aircraft components.	£600,000
16	Linley Development Ltd	7 September 2015	Gareth Jones	Crushed by wall collapse while excavating.	£200,000
17	Cheshire Gates and Automation Ltd	7 September 2015	Semelia Campbell	Trapped in a faulty electric gate.	£50,000
18	Baldwins Crane Hire Ltd	22 December 2015	Lindsay Easton	Crane crashed into an earth bank.	£700,000
19	Sherwood Rise Ltd	February 2016	Ivy Atkin	Died in a care home.	£300,000
20	Monavon Construction Ltd	June 2016	Gavin Brewer and Stuart Meads	Fell through roadside hoarding.	£500,000
21	Bilston Skips Ltd	August 2016	Jagpal Singh	Fell from the top of a skip.	£600,000
22	SR and JR Brown Ltd	March 2017	Benjamin Edge	Fell from a roof.	£300,000
23	Koseoglu Metalworks Ltd	May 2017	Nikolai Valkov	Fell through a skylight.	£300,000
24	Odzil Investments Ltd	May 2017	Nikolai Valkov	Fell through a skylight.	£500,000
25	Martinisation London Ltd	May 2017	Tomasz Procko and Kyrol Szymanski	Fell from a balcony when the railing was crushed by a sofa being lifted into a flat.	£1,200,000
26	Master Construction Products (Skips) Ltd	November 2017	Safi Qais Khan	Crushed by machinery.	£255,000
27	Deco-Pak	January 2022	Andrew Tibbott	Crushed to death by a robotic packing arm.	

== Bibliography ==
- "Corporate Manslaughter and Corporate Homicide: A Regulatory Impact Assessment of the Government's Bill" (PDF). Home Office. 2006. Archived from the original (PDF) on 16 February 2008.
- Clarkson, C. M. V. (1998). "Corporate culpability". Web Journal of Current Legal Issues. 2.
- Gobert, J. (2002). "Corporate killings at home and abroad - reflections on the government's proposals". Law Quarterly Review. 118: 72.
- Herring, J. (2004). Criminal Law: Text, Cases and Materials. Oxford: Oxford University Press. p. Chapter 13. ISBN 0-19-876578-9.
- Matthews, R. (2008). Blackstone's Guide to the Corporate Manslaughter and Corporate Homicide Act 2007. Oxford: Oxford University Press. ISBN 978-0-19-920321-5.
- Ministry of Justice (2007). "Guidance on the Act". Archived from the original on 4 January 2008.
- Sullivan, G. R. (2001). "Corporate killing - some government proposals". Criminal Law Review: 31.
