= 2014 West Midlands Police and Crime Commissioner by-election =

Election in Britain

- 21 August 2014

Position of West Midlands Police and Crime Commissioner
- Turnout: 10.38% (▼1.58%)
	First party	Second party
Candidate	David Jamieson	Les Jones
Party	Labour	Conservative
Popular vote	102,561	54,091
Percentage	50.8%	26.8%
	Third party	Fourth party
Candidate	Keith Rowe	Ayoub Khan
Party	UKIP	Liberal Democrats
Popular vote	32,187	12,950
Percentage	15.9%	6.5%
Swing		▼6.0%
PPC before election
Brynmor John
Labour
Subsequent PPC
Kim Howells
Labour

The 2014 West Midlands Police and Crime Commissioner by-election was a by-election for the position of Police and Crime Commissioner in the West Midlands Police region of the United Kingdom, held on 21 August 2014. It was triggered by the death of Bob Jones, the inaugural West Midlands Police and Crime Commissioner, who died on 1 July 2014.

The election had to be held with 35 working days of the vacancy by virtue of Section 51 of the Police Reform and Social Responsibility Act 2011. On 4 July 2014, Birmingham City Council, who oversaw the election, confirmed that the poll would be held on 21 August 2014.

== Candidates ==
On 25 July 2014, Birmingham City Council published the statement of persons nominated, which confirmed that four people had been validly nominated to stand:

- David Jamieson (Labour), former member of Solihull Metropolitan Borough Council and former MP for Plymouth Devonport
- Les Jones (Conservative), member of and former leader of Dudley Metropolitan Borough Council
- Ayoub Khan (Liberal Democrat) barrister and former member of Birmingham City Council
- Keith Rowe (UKIP), businessman

== Results ==
Jamieson won the election with 50.83% of first preference votes on a turnout of 10.38%. Turnout ranged between 9.78% in Sandwell to 11.58% in Solihull. Alexandra Runswick, director of the pressure group Unlock Democracy, said that "few voters knew that the election was happening and even fewer cared". The previous lowest turnout for a large-scale by-election in the United Kingdom since the Second World War was 18.2%, in the 2012 Manchester Central by-election.

2014 West Midlands Police and Crime Commissioner by-election
Party	Candidate	1st round		2nd round			1st round votesTransfer votes, 2nd round
Party	Candidate	Total	Of round	Transfers	Total	Of round	1st round votesTransfer votes, 2nd round
Labour	David Jamieson	102,561	50.8%				
Conservative	Les Jones	54,091	26.8%				
UKIP	Keith Rowe	32,187	15.9%				
Liberal Democrats	Ayoub Khan	12,950	6.5%				
Turnout		201,789	10.38%				
Rejected ballots		3,667	1.78%				
Total votes		205,456	10.41%				
Registered electors		1,993,998					
Labour hold							

== Previous result ==
West Midlands Police and Crime Commissioner election, 2012
Party	Candidate	1st round		2nd round			1st round votesTransfer votes, 2nd round
Party	Candidate	Total	Of round	Transfers	Total	Of round	1st round votesTransfer votes, 2nd round
Labour	Bob Jones	100,130	42.00%	17,285	117,415		
Conservative	Matt Bennett	44,130	18.51%	11,555	55,685		
Independent	Cath Hannon	30,778	12.91%				
UKIP	Bill Etheridge	17,563	7.37%				
Independent	Derek Webley	17,488	7.34%				
Liberal Democrats	Ayoub Khan	15,413	6.47%				
Independent	Mike Rumble	12,882	5.40%				
Turnout		238,384	11.96%				
Rejected ballots		7,063	2.88%				
Total votes		245,447	12.31%				
Registered electors		1,993,998					
Labour win							
