= Judicial dissolution =

Legal procedure that forcibly dissolves a corporation

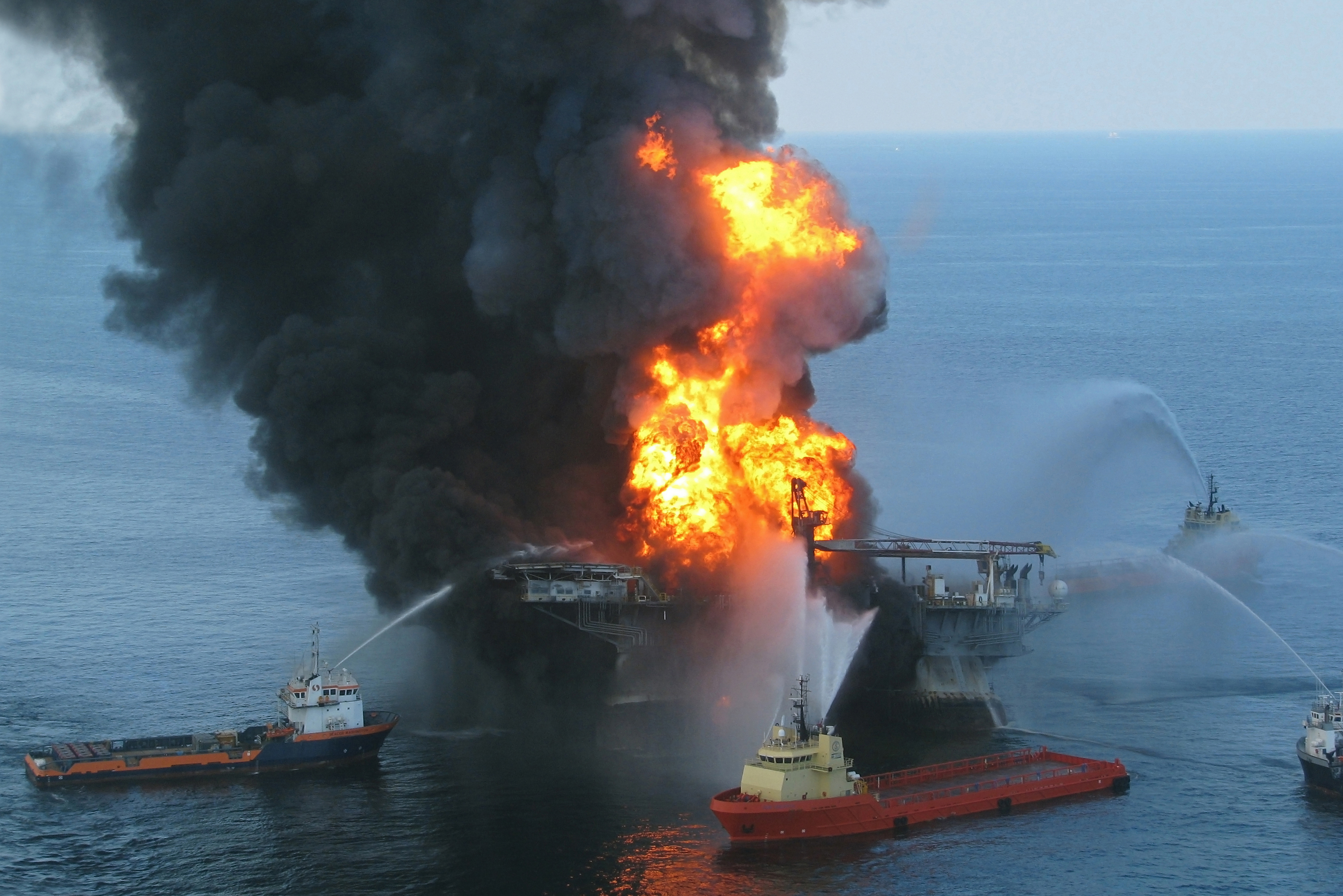
Negligence, such as causing preventable disasters like the Deepwater Horizon oil spill, is one justification often cited by proponents of a corporate death penalty.

Judicial dissolution, informally called the corporate death penalty, is a legal procedure in which a corporation is forced to dissolve or cease to exist.

Dissolution is the revocation of a corporation's charter for significant harm to society. In some countries, there are corporate manslaughter laws; however, almost all countries enable the revocation of a corporate charter. There have been numerous calls in the literature for a "corporate death penalty". In 2019, a study argued that industries that kill more people each year than they employ should have an industry-wide corporate death penalty. Some legal analysis has been done on the idea to revoke corporate charters for environmental violations such as for severe environmental pollution. Actual judicial dissolutions in the United States are rare. For example, Markoff has shown that no publicly traded company failed because of a criminal conviction that occurred between 2001 and 2010.

Companies suggested as deserving the corporate death penalty include Eli Lilly & Company, Equifax, Unocal Corporation, and Wells Fargo. "If other examples in this volume were forced out of existence, this would send a message", John Hulpke wrote in the Journal of Management Inquiry in 2017.

One argument against its use is that otherwise innocent employees and shareholders will lose money or their jobs. But author David Dayen argues in The New Republic that "the risk of a corporate death penalty should inspire active governance practices to protect their investments".

== Examples ==
=== North River Sugar Refining Corporation ===
The Court of Appeals in New York ordered the judicial dissolution of the North River Sugar Refining Corporation on June 24, 1890. The judges said a company can only do what its charter allows. If the charter does not allow it and it starts harming the public, then the state can end its existence.

== Alternatives ==
In some jurisdictions, a judge or a government may have the freedom to:

- Nationalise a corporation
- Fine it enough to force it to close
- Take employees to court
- Expel it
- Confiscate some of its assets
- Use competition law to break it up into separate entities

== See also ==
- Corporate crime
- Corporate manslaughter
- Corporate personhood
- Capital punishment
- Decartelization
