= 2012 Solihull Metropolitan Borough Council election =

2012 UK local government election

(2011 ←) 2012 United Kingdom local elections (→ 2014)

Map of the results of the 2012 Solihull council election. Conservatives in blue, Liberal Democrats in yellow, Greens in green, Labour in red and independent in grey.

The 2012 Solihull Metropolitan Borough Council election took place on 3 May 2012 to elect members of Solihull Metropolitan Borough Council in the West Midlands, England. One third of the council was up for election. The shock result of the election came in Blythe where the Independent Ratepayers ousted a Tory Incumbent. Prior to the election, the defending councillor in Shirley West had joined the Greens, having previously sat as an Independent Liberal Democrat. Following the election another Shirley West Liberal Democrat councillor, Andy Hodgson, joined the Greens, taking their total up to 6 seats, and the Liberal Democrats down to 10.

== Election result ==
Solihull Metropolitan Borough Council Election, 2012
Party	Seats	Gains	Losses	Net gain/loss	Seats %	Votes %	Votes	+/−
Conservative	9	1	2	-1	52.9	42.0	19,562	-6.3%
Liberal Democrats	3	0	1	-1	17.6	19.5	9,095	-0.0%
Green	3	1	0	+1	17.6	11.9	5,547	+4.4%
Labour	1	1	1	0	5.9	17.3	8,075	+0.7%
Independent Ratepayers & Residents	1	1	0	+1	5.9	6.4	2,997	+0.8%
English Democrat	0	0	0	0	0.0	2.4	1,115	+1.3%
BNP	0	0	0	0	0.0	0.3	150	-0.2%

This result had the following consequences for the total number of seats on the council after the elections :

Party	Previous council	New council
Conservatives	29	28
Liberal Democrat	12	11
Labour	6	6
Green	4	5
Independent Ratepayers & Residents	0	1
Total	51	51
Working majority	7	5

== Ward results ==
Bickenhill
Party	Candidate	Votes	%	±%
Conservative	Jim Ryan	1,349	57.62	−2.7
Labour	Margaret Elizabeth Brittin	573	24.48	+3.2
Green	Alex Hawkeswood	312	13.33	+8.2
Liberal Democrats	Peter Charles Lee	107	4.57	−0.8
Majority		776	33.15	−5.9
Turnout		2,341	25.6	−10.8
Conservative hold		Swing	-2.9	

Blythe
Party	Candidate	Votes	%	±%
Independent Ratepayer & Residents	Linda Brown	1,181	42.91	+23.1
Conservative	Martin McCarthy	1,020	37.06	−18.2
Liberal Democrats	Jo Hodgson	285	10.36	−0.2
Labour	Raj Singh	266	9.67	−2.3
Majority		161	5.85	−29.6
Turnout		2,752	27.1	−14.3
Independent Ratepayers & Residents gain from Conservatives		Swing	+20.6	

Castle Bromwich
Party	Candidate	Votes	%	±%
Conservative	Ted Richards	1,565	64.43	+0.3
Labour	Ben Semens	632	26.02	+2.1
Green	Joy Aldworth	167	6.88	−0.7
Liberal Democrats	Ronald Lloyd	65	2.76	New
Majority		933	38.41	−1.8
Turnout		2,429	26.8	−12.8
Conservative hold		Swing	-0.9	

Chelmsley Wood
Party	Candidate	Votes	%	±%
Green	Chris Williams	1,336	62.8	+11.5
Labour Co-op	Angela Reid	644	30.3	−0.8
Conservative	Catherine Price	147	6.9	−6.8
Majority		692	32.5	+12.3
Turnout		2,127	23.6	−5.0
Green gain from Labour		Swing	+6.1	

Dorridge & Hockley Heath
Party	Candidate	Votes	%	±%
Conservative	Ken Meeson	1,948	70.7	+1.9
Labour	Hugh Hendry	244	8.9	+1.1
Green	Sara Irene Stevens	210	7.6	+2.9
English Democrat	Andrew Martin Taylor	187	6.8	+2.8
Liberal Democrats	Jan Mason	165	6.0	−6.1
Majority		1,704	61.9	+5.1
Turnout		2,754	32.0	−19.5
Conservative hold		Swing	+0.4	

Elmdon
Party	Candidate	Votes	%	±%
Liberal Democrats	Glenis Ann Slater	1,321	47.3	+5.9
Conservative	Paul Thomas	657	23.5	−9.1
Labour	Andrew James Mullinex	451	16.1	+1.6
English Democrat	Robert Graham Lassen	239	8.5	+5.6
Green	Elaine Teresa Williams	127	4.5	+2.6
Majority		664	23.8	+15.0
Turnout		2,795	30.3	−12.1
Liberal Democrats hold		Swing	+7.5	

Kingshurst & Fordbridge
Party	Candidate	Votes	%	±%
Labour	Flo Nash	1,111	58.8	+8.0
Conservative	Debbie Evans	578	30.6	−5.9
Green	Gary Macnaughton	146	7.7	+2.4
Liberal Democrats	David Robert Godfrey	53	2.8	−0.5
Majority		533	28.2	+14.0
Turnout		1,888	21.2	−5.1
Labour gain from Conservative		Swing	+7.0	

Knowle
Party	Candidate	Votes	%	±%
Conservative	Jeff Potts	1,941	66.2	−2.7
Labour	Simon Martin Johnson	323	11.0	+0.8
Green	Jane Allison Holt	291	9.9	+2.9
Liberal Democrats	Lionel Arthur King	220	7.5	0.0
English Democrat	Frank (Shannon) O'Brien	157	5.3	+0.8
Majority		1,618	55.2	−3.5
Turnout		2,932	35.6	−15.3
Conservative hold		Swing	-1.7	

Lyndon
Party	Candidate	Votes	%	±%
Liberal Democrats	Irene Beatrice Chamberlain	1,265	46.9	+6.2
Labour	Ian Clifford English	583	21.6	+2.3
Conservative	David Skelding	442	16.4	−10.0
English Democrat	David Francis Reynolds	268	9.9	+3.4
Green	Frances Grice	138	5.1	+1.8
Majority		682	25.3	+11.0
Turnout		2,696	27.7	−11.6
Liberal Democrats hold		Swing	+1.9	

Meriden
Party	Candidate	Votes	%	±%
Conservative	Tony Diciccio	1318	45.7	−19.6
Independent Ratepayer	Ken Meeson	858	29.8	+23.3
Labour	Cathy Connan	412	14.3	−1.9
Green	Roger Philip King	173	6.0	+1.3
Liberal Democrats	Tony Ludlow	122	4.2	−3.1
Majority		460	16.0	−33.2
Turnout		2,883	30.5	−17.4
Conservative hold		Swing	-21.4	

Olton
Party	Candidate	Votes	%	±%
Liberal Democrats	Claire Louise O'Kane	1,899	50.5	+6.7
Conservative	David Price	1,326	35.3	−4.3
Labour	Alan Edward Jacques	316	8.4	−2.1
Green	Carol Joy Linfield	216	5.7	+2.2
Majority		573	15.2	+11.0
Turnout		3,757	38.8	−7.2
Liberal Democrats hold		Swing	+5.5	

Shirley East
Party	Candidate	Votes	%	±%
Conservative	Karen Grinsell	1,045	37.3	−6.9
Liberal Democrats	Sue Rose	850	30.3	+2.5
Labour	Kevin Peter Raven	390	13.9	+1.6
English Democrat	Lisa Jane White	264	9.4	+9.4
Independent Ratepayer	Neil Watts	252	9.0	−3.3
Majority		195	7.0	−9.4
Turnout		2,801	32.6	−13.2
Conservative gain from Liberal Democrats		Swing	-4.7	

Shirley South
Party	Candidate	Votes	%	±%
Conservative	Gary Allport	1,379	38.5	−0.4
Liberal Democrats	Tim Hodgson	1,343	37.5	+3.1
Independent Ratepayer	Trevor Eames	463	12.9	+1.6
Labour	Shirley Rose Young	400	11.2	−0.9
Majority		36	1.0	−3.4
Turnout		3,585	36.5	−7.2
Conservative hold		Swing	-1.7	

Shirley West
Party	Candidate	Votes	%	±%
Green	Howard John Allen	1,001	39.1	+34.3
Conservative	Richard Holt	729	28.4	−6.6
Labour	Ray Brookes	426	16.6	−2.3
Liberal Democrats	Eimear Fossey	406	15.8	−15.2
Majority		272	10.6	+6.6
Turnout		2,562	28.4	−12.3
Green hold		Swing	+20.4	

Silhill
Party	Candidate	Votes	%	±%
Conservative	Peter Hogarth	1,811	59.4	+6.4
Liberal Democrats	Bruce Keith Stone	579	19.0	−7.5
Labour	Janet Mary Marsh	445	14.6	+2.9
Green	Trevor John Barker	212	7.0	+4.5
Majority		1,232	40.4	+13.9
Turnout		3,047	33.3	−14.9
Conservative hold		Swing	+6.9	

Smith's Wood
Party	Candidate	Votes	%	±%
Green	Mike Sheridan	1,030	57.7	+11.8
Labour	Mohammed Rashid	473	26.5	−6.7
BNP	Simone Neale	150	8.4	+8.4
Conservative	Sarah Evans	132	7.4	−5.2
Majority		557	31.2	+18.4
Turnout		1,785	20.1	−6.0
Green hold		Swing	+9.2	

St. Alphege
Party	Candidate	Votes	%	±%
Conservative	Kate Wild	2,175	63.8	−2.9
Liberal Democrats	Martin Smith	415	12.2	−3.9
Labour	Paul Cook Tuxworth	386	11.3	+1.1
Independent Ratepayer & Residents	John Rogers	243	7.1	+4.2
Green	Stephen Robert Holt	188	5.5	+1.5
Majority		1,760	51.7	+1.0
Turnout		3,407	33.0	−17.3
Conservative hold		Swing	+0.5	
