= West Midlands Police and Crime Commissioner =

The police and crime commissioner of the West Midlands Police

- Incumbent; Simon Foster since 13 May 2021
- Police and crime commissioner of West Midlands Police
- Reports to: West Midlands Police and Crime Panel
- Appointer: Electorate of West Midlands
- Term length: Four years
- Constituting instrument: Police Reform and Social Responsibility Act 2011
- Precursor: West Midlands Police Authority
- Inaugural holder: Bob Jones
- Formation: 22 November 2012
- Salary: £101,900
- Website: www.westmidlands-pcc.gov.uk

The West Midlands Police and Crime Commissioner is the police and crime commissioner of the West Midlands Police.

The PCC's official office is in Lloyd House, the West Midlands Police's headquarters, in Birmingham.

== History ==
The PCC role was set to be abolished with effect from 7 May 2024, with its functions transferred to the Mayor of the West Midlands. However, PCC Simon Foster won a High Court judicial review of the decision, with Mr. Justice Swift saying "The home secretary did not, when consulting, provide sufficient information to permit an intelligent and informed response." A government spokesperson said permission to appeal would be sought. Foster said he expected an election would take place in May. The appeal was dismissed and the election was held on 2 May 2024.

== List of West Midlands Police and Crime Commissioners ==
Name	Political party	From	To
Bob Jones	Labour	22 November 2012	1 July 2014
Yvonne Mosquito (acting)	Labour	14 July 2014	21 August 2014
David Jamieson	Labour	22 August 2014	12 May 2021
Simon Foster	Labour	13 May 2021	Incumbent

== Election results ==
=== 2012 ===
West Midlands Police and Crime Commissioner election, 2012
Party	Candidate	1st round		2nd round			1st round votesTransfer votes, 2nd round
Party	Candidate	Total	Of round	Transfers	Total	Of round	1st round votesTransfer votes, 2nd round
Labour	Bob Jones	100,130	42.00%	17,285	117,415		
Conservative	Matt Bennett	44,130	18.51%	11,555	55,685		
Independent	Cath Hannon	30,778	12.91%				
UKIP	Bill Etheridge	17,563	7.37%				
Independent	Derek Webley	17,488	7.34%				
Liberal Democrats	Ayoub Khan	15,413	6.47%				
Independent	Mike Rumble	12,882	5.40%				
Turnout		238,384	11.96%				
Rejected ballots		7,063	2.88%				
Total votes		245,447	12.31				
Registered electors							
Labour win							

=== 2014 ===
West Midlands Police and Crime Commissioner by-election, 2014
Party	Candidate	1st round		2nd round			1st round votesTransfer votes, 2nd round
Party	Candidate	Total	Of round	Transfers	Total	Of round	1st round votesTransfer votes, 2nd round
Labour	David Jamieson	102,561	50.8%				
Conservative	Les Jones	54,091	26.8%				
UKIP	Keith Rowe	32,187	15.9%				
Liberal Democrats	Ayoub Khan	12,950	6.5%				
Turnout		201,789	10.38%				
Rejected ballots		3,667	1.78%				
Total votes		205,456	10.41				
Registered electors							
Labour win							

=== 2016 ===
West Midlands Police and Crime Commissioner election, 2016
Party	Candidate	1st round		2nd round			1st round votesTransfer votes, 2nd round
Party	Candidate	Total	Of round	Transfers	Total	Of round	1st round votesTransfer votes, 2nd round
Labour	David Jamieson	275,672	49.88%	30,906	306,578	63.4%	
Conservative	Les Jones	142,651	25.81%	34,271	176,922	36.6%	
UKIP	Pete Durnell	93,851	16.98%				
Independent	Andy Flynn	40,478	7.31%				
Turnout		552,652	27.71%				
Rejected ballots		28,346	4.88%				
Total votes		580,998	29.13%				
Registered electors							
Labour hold							

=== 2021 ===
2021 West Midlands police and crime commissioner election
Party	Candidate	1st round		2nd round			1st round votesTransfer votes, 2nd round
Party	Candidate	Total	Of round	Transfers	Total	Of round	1st round votesTransfer votes, 2nd round
Labour	Simon Foster	276,743	45.51%	24,663	301,406	53.70%	
Conservative	Jay Singh-Sohal	239,288	39.35%	20,551	259,839	46.30%	
Liberal Democrats	Jon Hunt	38,594	6.35%				
Independent	Julie Hambleton	27,664	4.55%				
Reform	Mark Hoath	18,002	2.96%				
We Matter	Desmond Jaddoo	7,745	1.27%				

=== 2024 ===
2024 West Midlands police and crime commissioner election
Party	Candidate	Votes	%	±%
Labour	Simon Foster*	327,844	57.55	
Conservative	Tom Byrne	241,827	42.45	
