= Bob Jones (police commissioner) =

British politician and police commissioner (1955-2014)

Bob Jones CBE
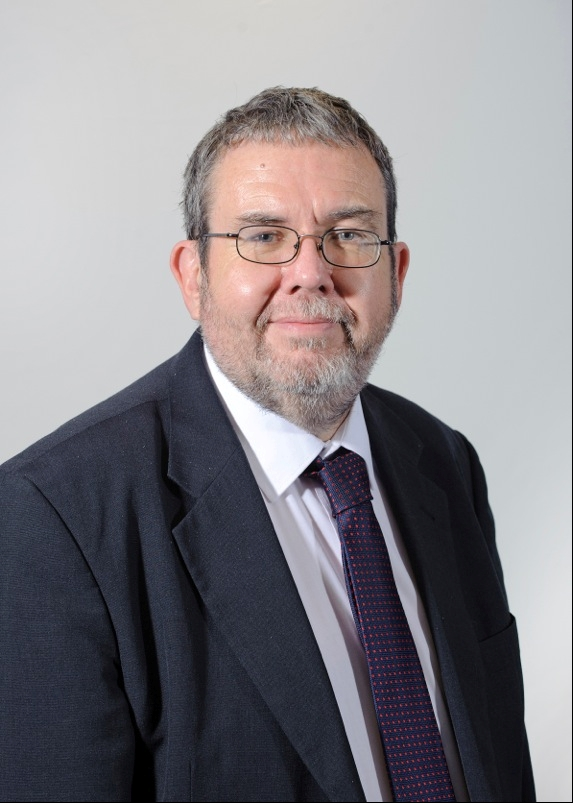
- Jones in 2013

West Midlands Police and Crime Commissioner
- In office 22 November 2012 – 1 July 2014
- Deputy: Yvonne Mosquito
- Preceded by: Office established
- Succeeded by: David Jamieson

Personal details
- Born: Robert Moelwyn Jones; 27 January 1955 Wolverhampton, England
- Died: 1 July 2014 (aged 59) Wolverhampton, England
- Party: Labour
- Spouse: Sarah Edmondson

Robert Moelwyn Jones, CBE (27 January 1955 – 1 July 2014) was a British Labour politician who served as a member of Wolverhampton City Council from 1980 to 2013 and as the West Midlands Police and Crime Commissioner from 2012-14.

He was elected West Midlands Police and Crime Commissioner on 15 November 2012, becoming the first person to hold the post, until his death on 1 July 2014.

== Early career ==
Jones was born in Wolverhampton and studied for a degree in Public Administration at the University of Nottingham.

Jones served as a Labour Councillor for Blakenhall Ward on Wolverhampton City Council from 1 May 1980 to 2013. Jones was a Cabinet member for Leisure and Community Safety and served on various scrutiny boards. He also held responsibilities as Chair of Education, Finance, Youth Committees and many others on the City Council.

He was the Labour Party candidate for Wolverhampton South West in the 1983 general election, but was defeated by Conservative incumbent Nicholas Budgen, taking 13,694 votes (27.5%) to Budgen's 25,214 votes (50.6%).

He was a member of the West Midlands Police Authority from 1986 to 2012, and chaired the Authority from 1995 to 2000. He also served as a member of the Association of Police Authorities (APA) where he was Deputy Chairman from 2004 to 2005 and Chairman from 2005 to 2009. He was also a member of the National Policing Board, National Criminal Justice Board, and Senior Appointment Panel.

Jones served as Chair of Wolverhampton Community Safety Partnership. He was also a member of the service authorities for the National Crime Squad (NCS) and National Criminal Intelligence Service (NCIS) and chaired the disciplinary committee for both authorities. In 2010 Jones was appointed a CBE for "services to policing".

Jones served as a non-executive director of the Black Country Cluster PCT Boards and chaired various other local community organisations and trusts. He was also the Campaigning Strategy Director for the Campaign for Real Ale.

== West Midlands Police and Crime Commissioner ==
In November 2012, Jones was elected as Police and Crime Commissioner (PCC) for the West Midlands. PCCs replaced Police Authorities in all forces across England and Wales outside the Met. Turnout in the West Midlands was 238,384 (12%), with Jones beating the Conservative Party candidate, Matt Bennett, winning 117,388 votes in total. Jones assumed office on 22 November 2012. He resigned as a Councillor in 2013.

The following table shows the breakdown of the election results for the West Midlands:

West Midlands Police Commissioner election, 2012(BBC News)
Party	Candidate	1st round		2nd round			1st round votesTransfer votes, 2nd round
Party	Candidate	Total	Of round	Transfers	Total	Of round	1st round votesTransfer votes, 2nd round
Labour	Bob Jones	100,130	42%	17,258	117,388		
Conservative	Matt Bennett	44,130	18.5%	11,555	55,685		
Independent	Cath Hannon	30,778	12.9%	0	30,778		
UKIP	Bill Etheridge	17,563	7.4%	0	17,563		
Independent	Derek Webley	17,488	7.3%	0	17,488		
Liberal Democrats	Ayoub Khan	15,413	6.5%	0	15,413		
Independent	Mike Rumble	12,882	5.4%	0	12,882		
Turnout		238,384	12.0%				
Labour win							

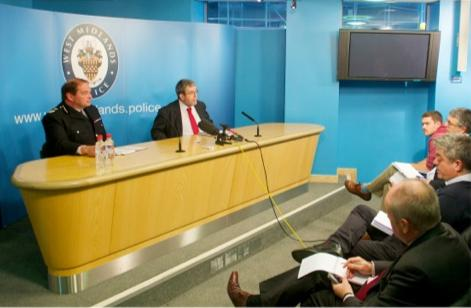
Jones in a press conference on his first day of work, 8 January 2013

From his Candidate Statement, key pledges made by Jones included: introducing community led Local Policing Boards which would establish local policing priorities and be engaged in local police commander appointments; retaining PCSOs; bringing police contact points into council and other community buildings; and redressing the financial settlement allocated to West Midlands Police by the government, which was seen as poor in comparison to that given to other forces.

Jones appointed Nechells councillor Yvonne Mosquito as his deputy shortly after taking office.

His first act in the job was to scrap the West Midlands Police Authority's plans to explore private partnerships that would have seen some services provided by private contractors. Jones stated that he would consider selling the force HQ, Lloyd House, if "the right financial offer came along".

In an article for The Guardian in September 2013, Jones wrote that PCCs should be scrapped, saying: "after nine months in the job, I see no evidence that police and crime commissioners are an improvement on the previous police authorities." He explained that "PCCs have weaker appointment and dismissal powers than police authorities, having lost the ability to appoint and dismiss deputy and assistant chief constables. Despite only having powers over chief constables, a lot is happening that causes concern", adding that, "short-term political considerations have greater weight than long-term sustainability in many PCC policing budgets. This is a by-product of political immediacy where directly elected politicians want to see eye-catching gimmicks for the electorate." He concluded that "the easy way to be a PCC is to not make any unpopular decisions about having the resources to hold the force to account, and act like a ceremonial mayor – cutting ribbons, taking the photo opportunities and launching a few initiatives. Everything else is left to the chief constable in the hope that he or she doesn't mess up or, more cynically, in the belief that you can get away with sacking them and passing on the blame before the next election."

== Death ==
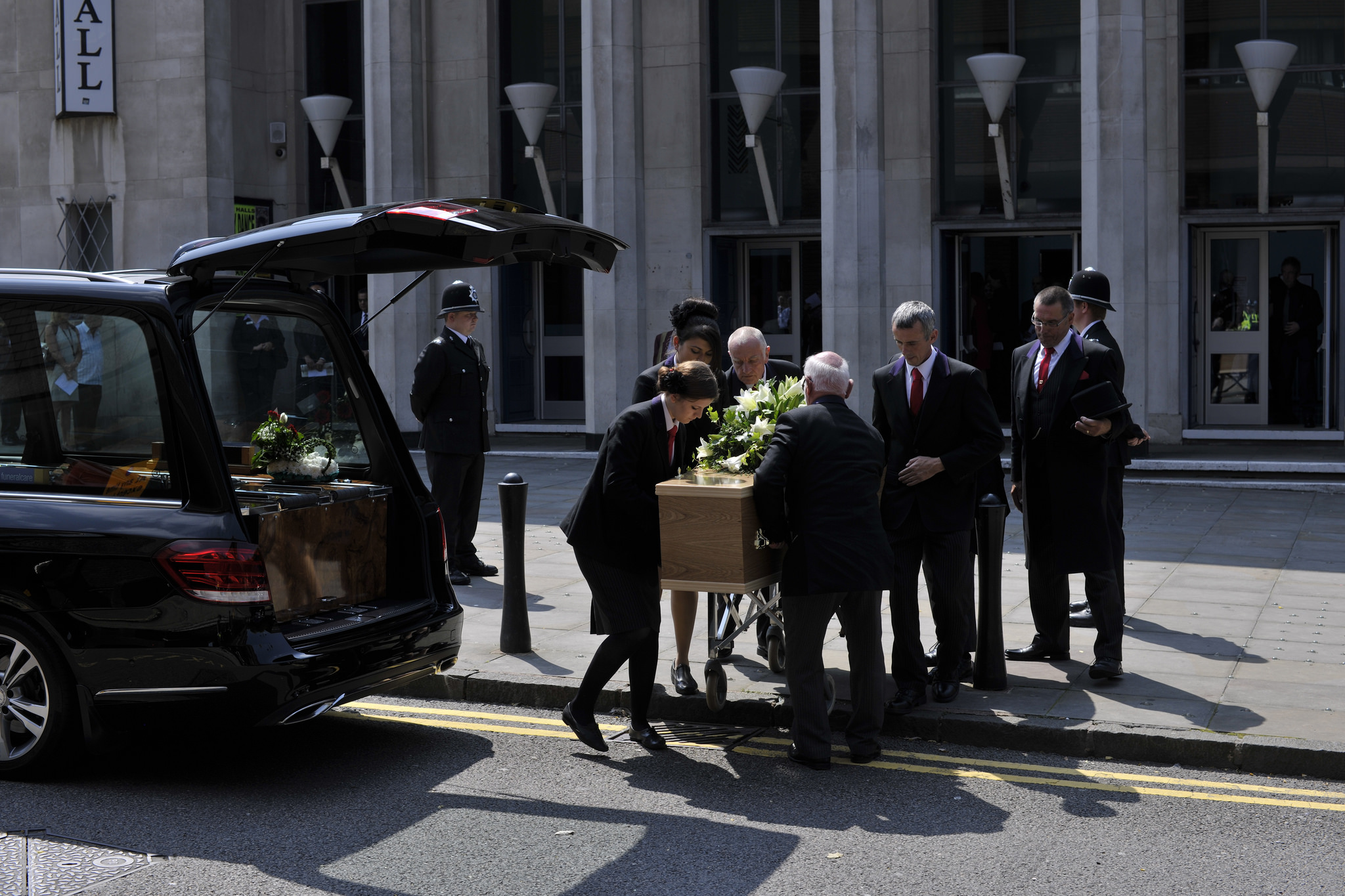
Jones's coffin arriving for the memorial service at the Civic Hall, Wolverhampton

Jones died suddenly in his sleep on 1 July 2014. He was 59 years old. A memorial event was held on 23 July, at Wolverhampton Civic Hall. A by-election to replace him as PCC was held on 21 August. It was won by Labour candidate David Jamieson.
