= Land's End disaster =

1985 fatal incident on the south-west coast of England

Coordinates: 50.0663°N 5.7164°W

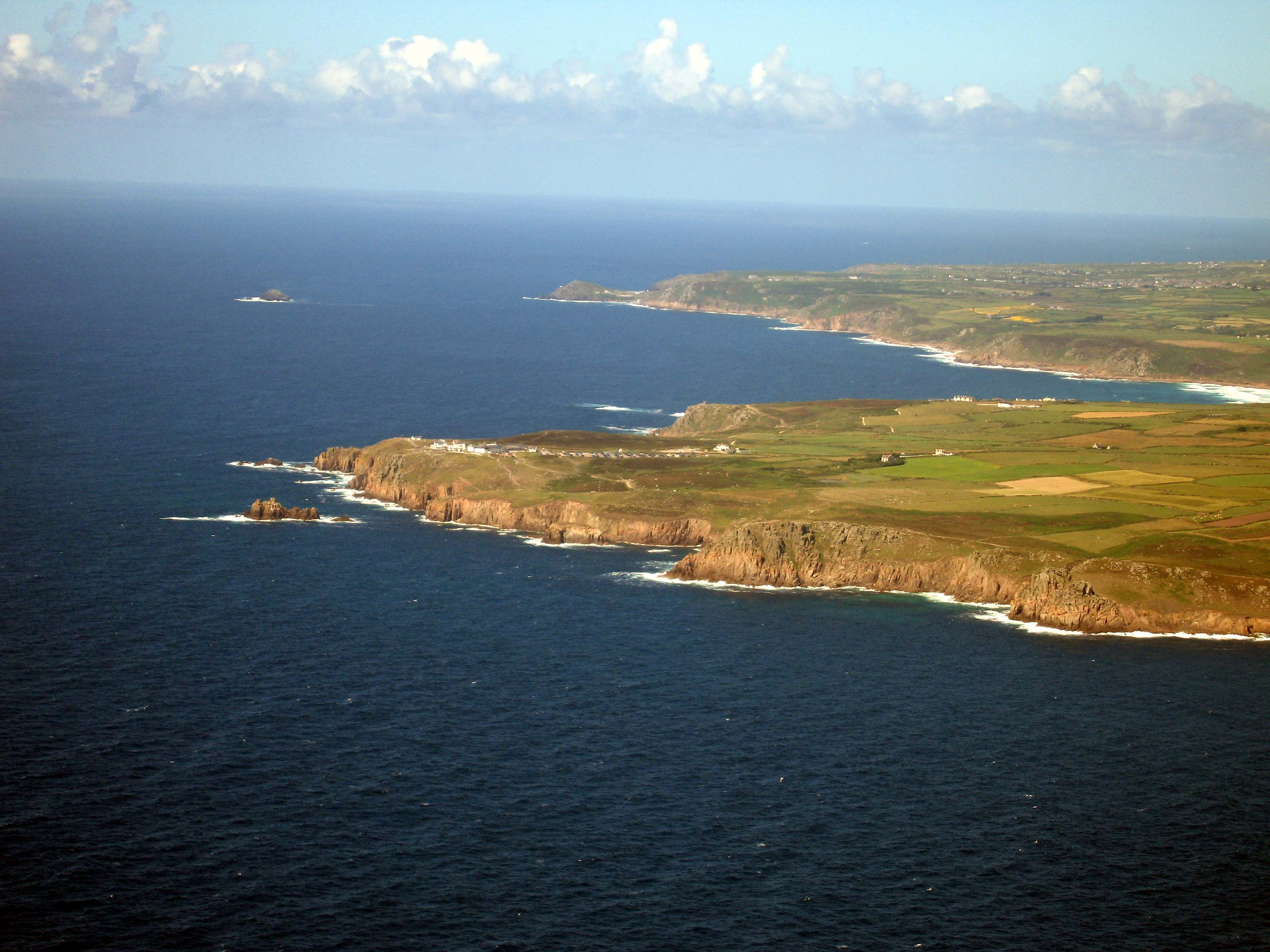
Land's End, seen from the air in 2006

The Land's End disaster occurred at Land's End, western Cornwall, England on 6 May 1985. Four pupils from Stoke Poges School drowned after they were swept out to sea. Although the inquest returned a verdict of death by misadventure, a following private inquiry by Buckinghamshire County Council was critical of headteacher Alec Askew and teacher Robert Harrington. The disaster prompted the Department of Education and Science's national guidelines for school trips, Safety in Outdoor Education, and the adoption of safety recommendations made by the National Association of Head Teachers.

== Incident ==
On 6 May 1985, a group of 51 pupils from Stoke Poges County Middle School in Buckinghamshire visited Land's End during a week-long adventure holiday based at the Duporth Holiday Village in Cornwall. Eleven pupils, all aged between 10 and 12, scrambled down a cliff path to reach rocks approximately 10 to 15 feet above sea level and remained there for around half an hour playing a game of "dodge the spray".

Although sea conditions were calm, a large wave caused by a heavy swell either swept or drenched the pupils. Six of them climbed to safety and the remaining five were swept into the sea. Among them were James Holloway (11), Ricky Lamden (11) and Robert Ankers (12), along with Nicholas Hurst (10), who was also swept away after trying to rescue the others. The fifth pupil, Heather Price (12), was rescued by a parent after being washed into a cleft. She was pulled up to a higher ledge and both of them were subsequently brought to the top of the cliff by helicopter.

The four missing children remained unaccounted for by the end of the day, despite a search involving a Royal Navy helicopter, a minesweeper, two lifeboats and a fishing boat. The seven surviving pupils were taken to West Cornwall Hospital in Penzance to be treated for cold and shock. Price, whose condition was "stable", was detained due to head injuries and hypothermia. Only the bodies of Holloway and Ankers were later recovered.

== Inquest ==
Questions were soon raised by parents as to why the children were allowed onto the rocks, which were usually only frequented by experienced climbers. The school's headteacher, Alec Askew, who was present on the trip, denied negligence and claims the children were unsupervised. He also stated that the party had been given no warning of the dangers, nor were there any notices in place.

The inquest was held at the Queen's Hotel in Penzance and opened on 15 July 1985. Survivor Heather Price confirmed that none of the three teachers and two parents responsible for the party that day were present with the group of 11 who wandered below the cliffs, but remained at the top organising a photograph session at the headland's famous signpost. One of the parent-helpers, David Paddison, who rescued Price, claimed that the children had permission to go wherever they wanted on the condition that they follow paths and stay on the clifftop, although at least two of the children stated at the inquest that no instructions were given when they arrived at Land's End.

Both Askew and teacher Robert Harrington denied any negligence at the inquest. Harrington stated he was unaware of the cliff path and did not see any children go down it. Askew claimed he did not think the children were in any immediate danger, but had sent a pupil to tell the children to come back up when he became aware they were down there.

The jury returned on 19 July with a verdict of death by misadventure. The affected parents described the verdict as "disappointing" and called for the school's dismissal of Askew. Askew resigned in the days after the verdict, citing the unwanted media attention he received following the inquest.

== Inquiry ==
Buckinghamshire County Council's private inquiry into the disaster was launched on 4 September 1985 and lasted six days. The resulting 64-page report was published on 11 November 1985 and made 22 proposals for the future organisation and conduct of school trips.

The report was critical of the conduct of both headteacher Alec Askew and teacher Robert Harrington. It found that Askew's "preparation and planning for the visit was inadequate and, in a number of ways, seriously unsatisfactory", and noted he "failed to organise sufficient supervision and failed to act when he saw the children in danger". In light of the findings, Harrington resigned.

== Legacy ==
The disaster subsequently prompted the Department of Education and Science's national guidelines for school trips, Safety in Outdoor Education, which was published in 1989. It also resulted in the widespread adoption by the UK's education authorities of new safety recommendations made by the National Association of Head Teachers.

During 1985, in response to recommendations made at the inquest, six noticeboards were installed at Land's End to warn visitors of the "natural hazards and potential danger[s]" of the cliffs and sea.

The Royal National Lifeboat Institution's Mersey class lifeboat The Four Boys, which was based at the Sennen Cove station, was named in memory of the pupils who lost their lives. It was first launched on 28 November 1991 and a naming and dedication ceremony was held on 22 April 1992, with Prince Edward, Duke of Kent, officiating. The families of the four victims, along with residents of Stoke Poges and other communities in South Buckinghamshire, raised approximately £100,000 towards the boat's £450,000 cost.

== See also ==
- Lyme Bay canoeing disaster
