= Yvonne Mosquito =

British politician (born 1964)

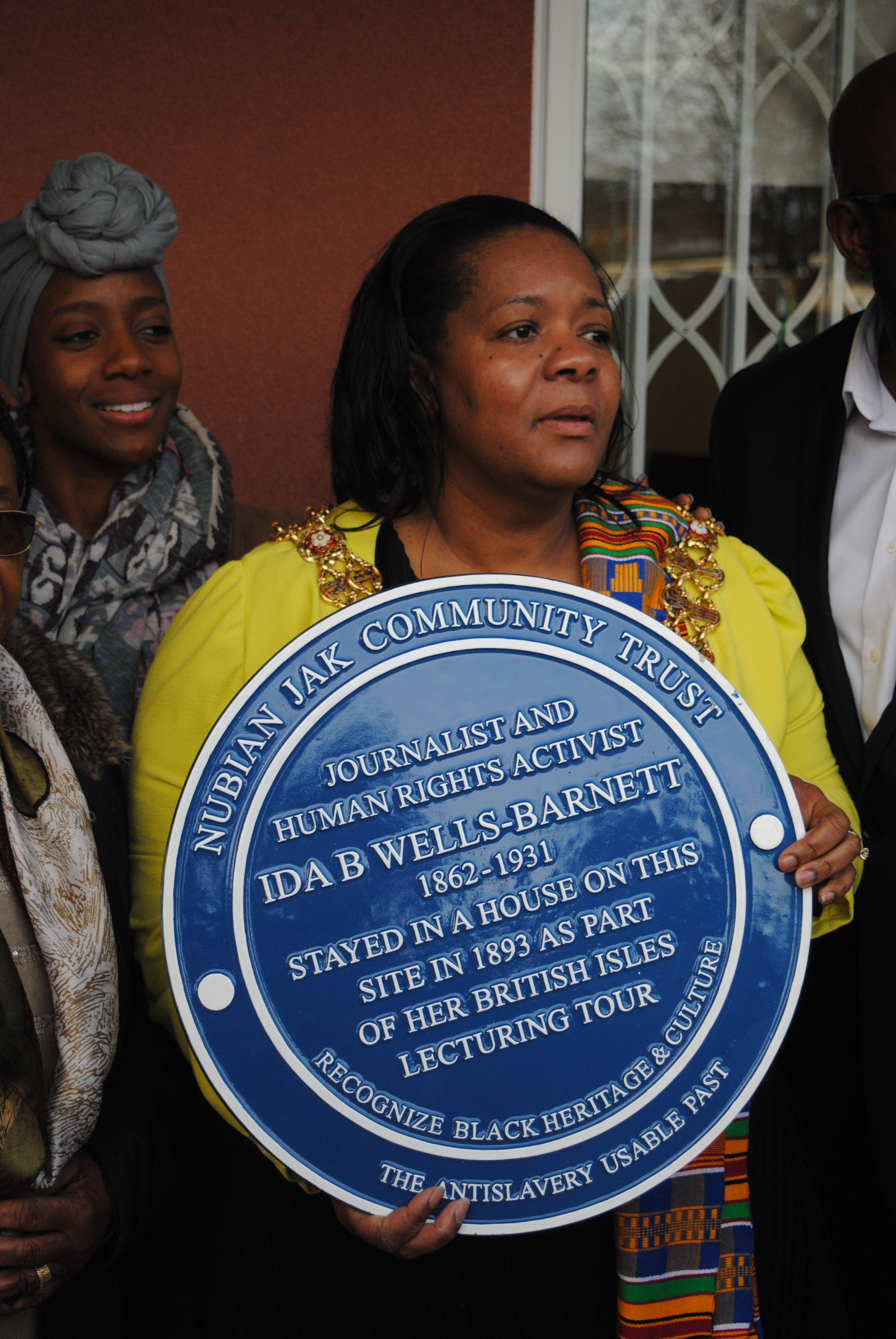
- Mosquito in 2019

West Midlands Deputy Police and Crime Commissioner
- In office 2012–2016
- Preceded by: Office established
- Succeeded by: Ashley Bertie

109th Lord Mayor of Birmingham
- In office May 2018 – May 2019
- Deputy: Ken Woods
- Preceded by: Anne Underwood
- Succeeded by: Mohammed Azim

Member of the Birmingham City Council for Nechells (1996-2018), Bordesley & Highgate
- In office 2 May 1996 – 6 May 2026

Personal details
- Born: 19 December 1964 (age 61) Birmingham, England
- Party: Labour

Yvonne Mosquito (born 19 December 1964) is a British politician who served as the 109th Lord Mayor of Birmingham between 2018 and 2019 for the Labour Party. She served as a member of Birmingham City Council for thirty years from 1996 until 2026. Mosquito also served as West Midlands Deputy Police and Crime Commissioner between 2012 and 2016, until a suspension in March 2016 after visiting the family of a murder victim.

== Early life and career ==
Mosquito was born in Balsall Heath and worked at a Saturday school in Handsworth. She then worked for a double glazing company and in the early 1990s worked with young people to help them further their opportunities. In 1996 she was elected to Birmingham City Council as a Labour Party councillor. She is also an ordained minister.

== West Midlands Deputy Police and Crime Commissioner ==
Having been a Labour Councillor since 1996, in 2012 Mosquito was made the first West Midlands Deputy Police and Crime Commissioner when the position was established. She served under fellow Labour Councillor Bob Jones, who said following his recommendation that "she brings a wealth of experience as a councillor, police authority member and community campaigner". Following Jones' death in 2014, Mosquito became acting Commissioner, and in June 2014, when David Jamieson was elected as the new Commissioner, Jamieson announced that Mosquito would keep her job as deputy Commissioner.

In March 2016 Mosquito was immediately suspended from her role after visiting the family of 18-year-old murder victim Kenichi Phillips, thereby breaching protocol. She confirmed she had been suspended by writing: "I can confirm that David Jamieson, the Police and Crime Commissioner, has suspended me. I strenuously deny all of the allegations." However, it was revealed at the end of March that four weeks prior to her suspension, Mosquito had issued a (non formal) complaint about Jamieson's behaviour towards her. The union representing her, Unite, issued a statement at the time saying they were "appalled that information that should be private and confidential as part of the disciplinary process has been put into the public domain".

In April, Maxie Hayes, a human rights activist, criticised Mosquito's suspension as "heavy-handed" and argued she visited the family as "an ordained minister giving condolences to a grieving family" rather than in her official capacity. In May, a disciplinary hearing found that Mosquito committed "serious misconduct" and asked that she apologise to the Office of the Police and Crime Commissioner, West Midlands Police, and Phillips's family. Mosquito officially left her post in May. In December, Mosquito took Jamieson to an employment tribunal which was scheduled for May the following year; however, the tribunal did not take place after Mosquito allegedly received a payout.

== Lord Mayor of Birmingham ==
In May 2018, Mosquito was made Lord Mayor of Birmingham after Lynda Clinton, Labour's original Lord Mayor Elect, lost her seat in Castle Vale ward by 91 votes on 4 May. The formal mover of the motion was Sybil Spence, the first black woman to serve as Lord Mayor. Mosquito herself became the second black woman and ninth woman overall to serve in the role of Lord mayor. Conservative Anne Underwood (who served as Lord Mayor 2017–2018) labelled her as a "champion of the underdog".

On 14 May 2019, near the end of her time as Lord Mayor, Mosquito officially opened comedian Joe Lycett's kitchen extension. After Mosquito initially declined to attend as it was not a public event, Lycett raffled four tickets to raise money for charity and allow four members of the public to attend. As it was now a public event, Mosquito agreed to open the kitchen extension. Celebrities such as comedian Katherine Ryan and Sky Sports presenter Lloyd Griffith were also in attendance, and a plaque was placed outside the kitchen extension naming it The Mosquito Wing.

In July 2019, Lycett revealed that the raffle made over £3,000 for charity as he presented the money to Mosquito and her successor as Lord Mayor, the Liberal Democrats' Mohammed Azim. After Lycett presented the money, Mosquito said he "captures the spirit of Birmingham."

== West Midlands Police and Crime Commissioner ==
In June 2019, Mosquito announced her intention to run as the Labour candidate in the 2020 election for West Midlands Police and Crime Commissioner. There were four candidates on the Labour shortlist: herself, former North Warwickshire MP Mike O'Brien, a specialist housing and anti-social behaviour lawyer Simon Foster, and a former assistant chief executive at Sandwell Council Melanie Dudley. In September 2019, Foster was confirmed as the selected candidate.

== Elections contested ==
=== Birmingham City Council elections ===
Year	Ward	Party	Votes	% votes	Position	Ref.
1996	Sparkbrook	Labour	2,543	67.2	Won	
2000	Sparkbrook	Labour	2,307	44.7	Won	
2004	Nechells	Labour	1,417	29.4	Elected	
2007	Nechells	Labour	1,878	39.5	Won	
2011	Nechells	Labour	3,118	60.1	Won	
2015	Nechells	Labour	6,403	74.1	Won	
2018	Bordesley & Highgate	Labour	1,176	78.5	Won	
2022	Bordesley & Highgate	Labour	925	57.3	Won	
