= Simon Foster =

UK Police and Crime Commissioner

West Midlands Police and Crime Commissioner
- Incumbent
- Assumed office 12 May 2021
- Preceded by: David Jameson

Personal details
- Born: 1961 (age 64–65)
- Party: Labour

Simon Foster (born 1961) is a British Labour Party politician who has served as the West Midlands Police and Crime Commissioner since May 2021.

Prior to his election, Foster worked as a legal aid solicitor for 35 years. For 22 of those years, he was a partner in a law firm, where he specialised in housing and public law.

Foster was first elected as the Police and Crime Commissioner (PCC) for the West Midlands in May 2021. He was re-elected to the position in May 2024 on a turnout of 29.5%.

Foster is married and has three daughters. He has lived in the West Midlands for over 38 years.
