= Corporate manslaughter in English law =

Homicide committed by a company or organisation

Corporate manslaughter is a criminal offence in English law, being an act of homicide committed by a company or organisation. In general, in English criminal law, a juristic person is in the same position as a natural person, and may be convicted for committing many offences. The Court of Appeal confirmed in one of the cases following the Herald of Free Enterprise disaster that a company can, in principle, commit manslaughter, although all defendants in that case were acquitted.

== Theory and historical development ==
The common law test to impose criminal responsibility on a company only arises where a person's gross negligence has led to another person's death and (under the "identification doctrine") that person is a "controlling mind", whose actions and intentions can be imputed to the company (that is, a person in control of the company's affairs to a sufficient degree that the company can fairly be said to think and act through him). This is tested by reference to the detailed work patterns of the manager, and the job title or description given to that person is irrelevant, but there is often no single person who acts as a "controlling mind", particularly in large companies, and many issues of health and safety are delegated to junior managers who are not "controlling minds".

On 6 March 1987, 193 people died when the Herald of Free Enterprise capsized. Although individual employees failed in their duties, the Sheen Report severely criticised the attitude to safety prevalent in P&O, stating:

All concerned in management ... were at fault in that all must be regarded as sharing responsibility for the failure of management. From top to bottom the body corporate was infected with the disease of sloppiness.

There was significant institutional resistance to the appropriateness of using the criminal law in general, and homicide charges in particular in this type of situation. Judicial review of the coroner's inquest persuaded the Director of Public Prosecutions to bring manslaughter charges against P&O European Ferries and seven employees, but the trial judge ruled that there was no evidence that one sufficiently senior member of the company's management could be said to have been negligent.

A subsequent appeal confirmed that corporate manslaughter is a charge known to English criminal law, and with the revival of gross negligence as a mens rea for manslaughter, it was thought that prosecutions might succeed. However, a prosecution of Great Western Trains following the Southall rail crash collapsed because "the Crown was not in a position to satisfy the doctrine of identification" (Turner J). Only the company itself and the train driver, Larry Harrison, were prosecuted. Since the train driver is not someone of a managerial or directorial level, the case against him was dismissed in the opening arguments. Because the only other defendant was GWT, a corporation, this meant that it was impossible to identify a controlling mind for the purposes of holding an individual personally liable for manslaughter.

In English law, proving corporate manslaughter and securing a conviction of an individual where the corporation involved is a small concern are easier where it is easier to identify a "controlling mind" (in R v OLL Ltd, 1994, about the Lyme Bay canoeing tragedy, managing director Peter Kite was convicted), but efforts to convict people in larger corporate entities tends to fail as the management structure is more diffuse making this identification more difficult. Instead, the prosecution stands more chance of pursuing a case successfully if it prosecutes simply on the grounds of a safety breach under the Health and Safety at Work etc. Act 1974.

Following R v. Prentice, a breach of duty amounts to 'gross negligence' when there is:

indifference to an obvious risk of injury to health; actual foresight of the risk coupled with the determination nevertheless to run it; appreciation of the risk coupled with an intention to avoid it but also coupled with such a high degree of negligence in the attempted avoidance as the jury consider justifies conviction, and inattention or failure to advert to a serious risk which goes "beyond inadvertence" in respect of an obvious and important matter which the defendant's duty demanded he should address.

The Law Commission's 1996 report on involuntary manslaughter found that the gross negligence formula overcomes the problems of having to find one particular officer who has the mens rea for the offence and allows emphasis to be placed on the company's attitude to safety. This question would only arise where the company has chosen to enter a field of activity that carries a risk to others, such as transport, manufacture or medical care. The steps the company has taken to discharge the "duty of safety" and the systems devised for running its business, will be directly relevant. Although only expressed as a provisional view, it is significant that the Law Commission echoes here the recognition of corporate safety systems voiced in the Seaboard case. Thus, a real tension is exposed between the paradigm of criminal culpability based on individual responsibility and the increasing recognition of the potential for harm inherent in large scale corporate activity.

The government issued a consultation paper in 2000, proposing reforms to the law to implement the recommendations of the Law Commission. A draft Corporate Manslaughter Bill was published in March 2005, and the Queen's Speech on 17 May 2005 included a reference to an Act of Parliament to be passed in 2005/6 to widen the scope for prosecutions for corporate manslaughter.

== New legislation from 2008 ==
A Corporate Manslaughter and Corporate Homicide Bill was introduced to the House of Commons by Home Secretary John Reid on 20 July 2006 to create new offences of corporate manslaughter, in England and Wales, and corporate homicide, in Scotland. Originally, the Bill proposed that the offence would require a company's or organisation's activities to be so managed or organised by its senior managers as to cause a person's death, and to amount to a "gross breach" of a duty of care owed to the deceased. The requirement for the failure of management or organisation to have been "by its senior managers" was dropped in Standing Committee. The Bill also sought to abolish the common law offence of manslaughter by gross negligence so far as it applies to corporations. A juristic person cannot be imprisoned, but the penalty would be an unlimited fine as for the existing common law offence. The Bill received royal assent on 26 July 2007, becoming the Corporate Manslaughter and Corporate Homicide Act 2007. The Act came into force on 6 April 2008. On 15 November 2007, the Sentencing Guidelines Council issued a consultative document recommending a starting point of a fine of 5% of turnover for a first offence with a not guilty plea, rising to 10% of turnover.

== Bibliography ==
- Fisse, B.; Braithwaite, J. (1994). Corporations, Crime and Accountability. London: Cambridge University Press. ISBN 0-521-45923-0.
- Glazebrook, P. (2002). "A better way of convicting businesses of avoiding deaths and injuries". Cambridge Law Journal. 61 (2): 405. doi:10.1017/S0008197302001678.
- Gobert, J. (2002). "Corporate killings at home and abroad - reflections on the government's proposals". Law Quarterly Review. 118: 72.
- — & Punch, M. (2003). Rethinking Corporate Crime. London: Butterworths LexisNexis. pp. 35–39. ISBN 0-406-95006-7.
- Matthews, R. (2008). Blackstone's Guide to the Corporate Manslaughter and Corporate Homicide Act 2007. Oxford: Oxford University Press. ISBN 978-0-19-920321-5.
- Sullivan, G. R. (1996). "The attribution of culpability to limited companies". Cambridge Law Journal. 55 (3): 515–546. doi:10.1017/S0008197300100492. S2CID 145799285.
- Sullivan, G. R. (2001). "Corporate killing - some government proposals". Criminal Law Review: 31.
- Wells, C. (1993). "Corporations: culture, risk and criminal liability". Criminal Law Review: 551.
- Wells, C. (2001). Corporations and Criminal Responsibility (2nd ed.). Oxford: Oxford University Press. pp. 154–160. ISBN 0-19-924619-X.
