= Lyme Bay canoeing disaster =

1993 fatal incident on the south coast of England

Coordinates: 50°42′N 2°54′W

The Lyme Bay canoeing disaster occurred in Lyme Bay, Southern England on 22 March 1993. Four teenagers died after getting into difficulty while on a sea kayaking trip from Lyme Regis to Charmouth. The incident led to reforms in the way in which activity centres were accredited in the United Kingdom and the passage of The Activity Centres (Young Persons' Safety) Act 1995.

== Incident ==
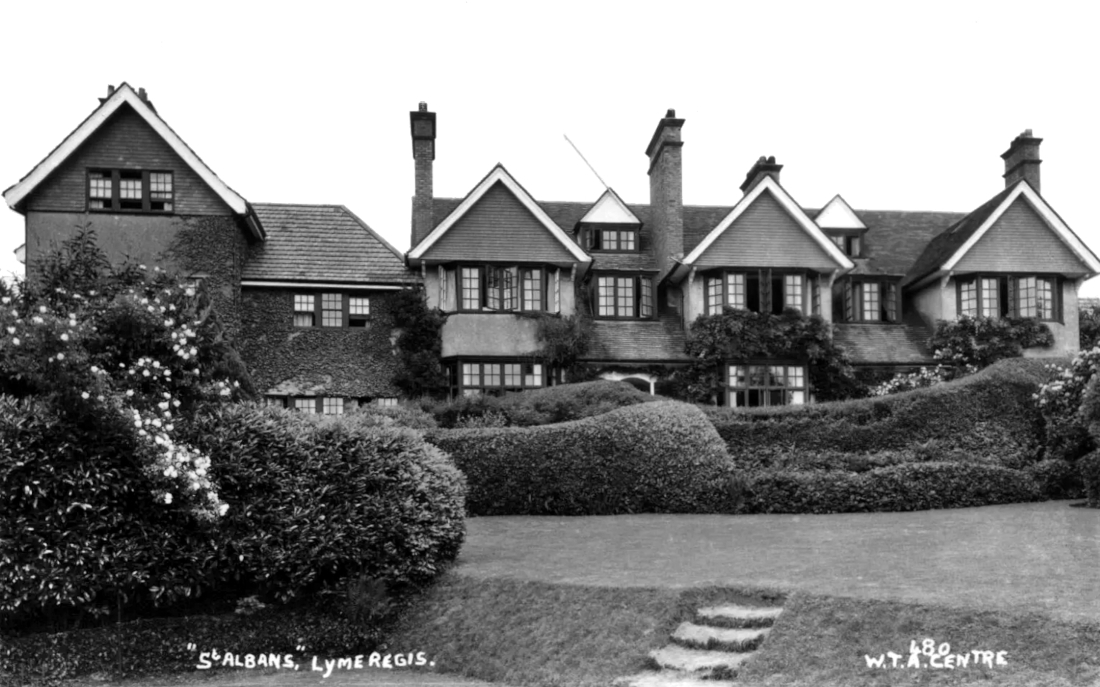
St Albans Outdoor Centre in circa 1935, when it was run by the Workers' Travel Association.

On 22 March 1993 at around 10 am, a group of eight schoolchildren and their teacher from Southway Community College, Plymouth were accompanied by two instructors from St Albans Outdoor Centre on a kayak trip in Lyme Bay from Lyme Regis to Charmouth, a distance of around two miles.

The group ran into issues shortly after setting off. One of the students, Dean Sayer, capsized while still close enough to the shore to stand up. Norman Pointer, the group's teacher, also capsized a number of times leading to one of the instructors, Tony Mann, staying behind to assist.

While Tony Mann assisted the group's teacher, Karen Gardner, the second instructor, rafted the pupils together. The group quickly drifted away from the shore due to the northerly, offshore, winds. As the group got further away from the wind shadow of the land, the sea state worsened which caused a number of the kayaks to swamp with water and sink, leaving the occupants in the water.

The St Albans Outdoor Centre handyman was due to meet the kayaking group at Charmouth. At around 12:30 pm, when the pupils did not arrive, he reported them overdue to the centre's manager, Joe Stoddart. Stoddart did not immediately inform HM Coastguard and instead searched the coast in a rescue boat and then from the shore in his car.

At 2:45 pm, a local fisherman found an empty kayak floating about 3 miles (4.8 km) south-west of Lyme Regis. He radioed HM Coastguard Portland who tasked a Land Rover to search the bay from the cliffs. At around 3 pm, when the group were more than three hours overdue, Joe Stoddart informed HM Coastguard of the missing party.

At 4:20 pm HM Coastguard Portland tasked Lyme Regis Lifeboat and a Royal Navy helicopter to search for the group of kayakers. Norman Pointer and Tony Mann were rescued by Lyme Regis Lifeboat at 5:11 pm while the remaining members of the group were rescued by the Royal Navy helicopter between 5:40 pm and 6:40 pm.

Four of the group, Dean Sayer, Claire Langley, Simon Dunne and Rachel Walker, died as a result of the incident. The coroner's verdict was that they had drowned.

== Inquest ==
The subsequent investigation resulted in Joe Stoddart and Peter Kite, the owner of the parent company of St Albans Outdoor Centre, being charged with manslaughter. In the days after the incident, the two instructors were found to hold the lowest level of qualification offered by the British Canoe Union.

In December 1994, Peter Kite was convicted to three years in prison for manslaughter through gross negligence. This sentence was reduced on appeal to two years, and Kite was released from prison with remission after 14 months. A previous employee of the outdoor centre had sent a letter to Peter Kite in the months prior to the incident warning of issues at the centre and stating "you might find yourselves trying to explain why someone’s son or daughter will not be coming home".

OLL Ltd, formerly Active Learning and Leisure Ltd, was found guilty of corporate manslaughter and subsequently fined £60,000. The conviction of OLL Ltd was the first example of a successful corporate manslaughter prosecution in the United Kingdom.

At trial, the jury failed to reach a verdict on Joe Stoddart and the prosecution decided against a retrial. As such, he was found not guilty of manslaughter at the direction of the judge.

== Aftermath ==
St Albans Outdoor Centre continued to operate in the months after the disaster. All water-based activities ended shortly afterwards when West Dorset District Council refused to renew the centre's licence to launch boats at Lyme Regis until the inquest was held. The centre ceased operations on 11 June 1993, with management citing a string of cancelled school bookings and insurance issues as the main causes for its closure.

The centre's lease was then acquired by PGL Young Adventure Ltd, who intended to reopen it in 1994. However, after six months' notice, the company surrendered the lease in April 1994, owing to "uncertainties over legal action connected with the tragedy". The owners, Joseph Allnatt Centres, sold the site in 1998 and it was run as the Woodberry Down Activity and Field Studies Centre into the 2010s.

The entire site was demolished in 2016 to make way for housing.

== Legacy ==
This incident accelerated governmental discussions to end self-regulation of outdoor education centres. The Activity Centres (Young Persons’ Safety) Act 1995, introduced by Labour MP David Jamieson, was passed through Parliament in January 1995. The bill mandated an independent licensing authority, the Adventure Activities Licensing Authority (AALA) be formed under the guidance of the Health and Safety Executive.

== See also ==
- Cairngorm Plateau disaster
- Land's End disaster
