= 2014 Solihull Metropolitan Borough Council election =

2014 UK local government election

(2012 ←) 2014 United Kingdom local elections (→ 2015)

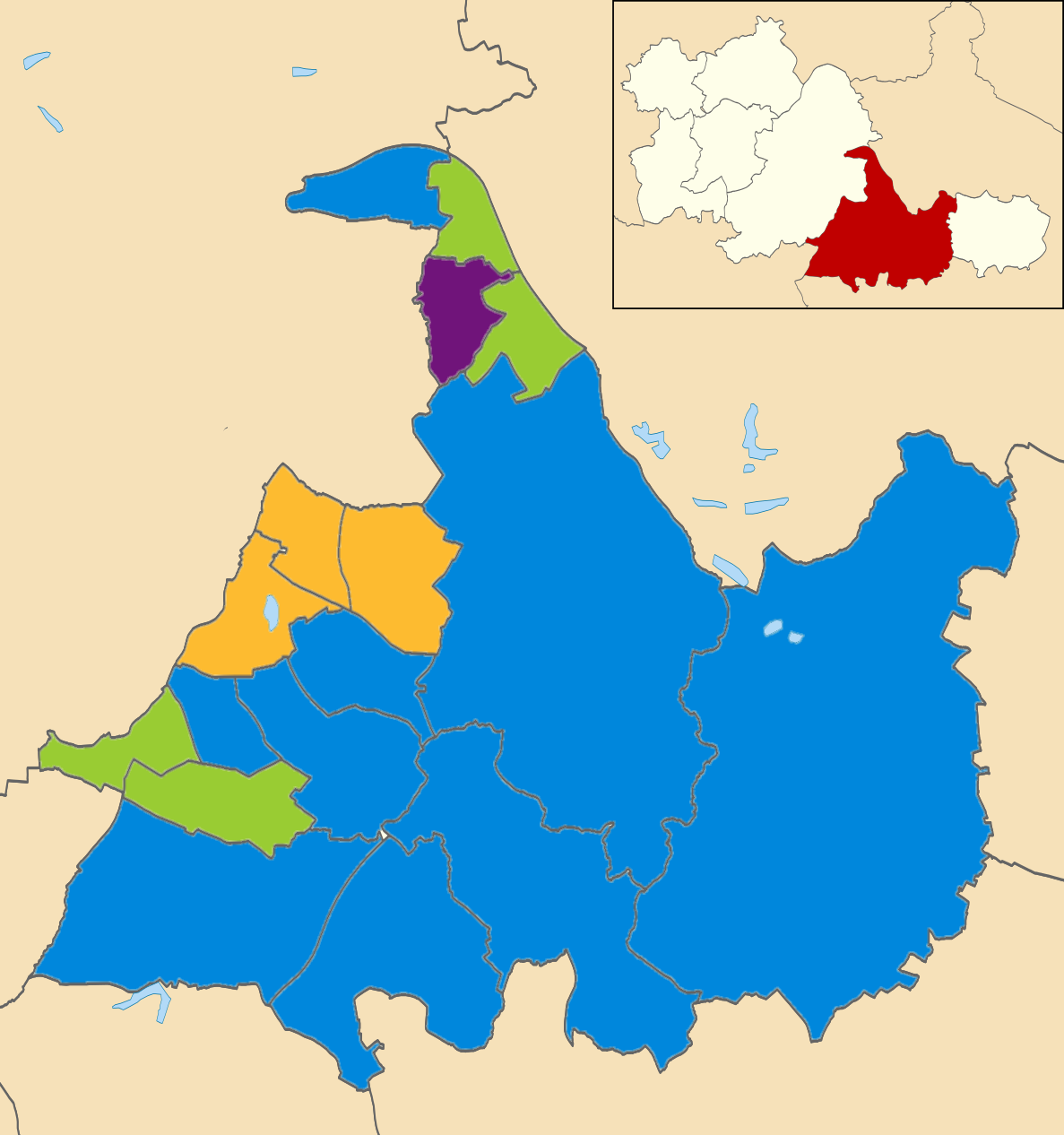
2014 local election results in Solihull

Elections to Solihull Metropolitan Borough Council were held on 22 May 2014, alongside European elections.

== Ward results ==
Bickenhill
Party	Candidate	Votes	%	±%
Conservative	Alison Rolf	1,268	42.6	
UKIP	Robert Alan Hall	969	32.6	
Labour	Mike Longfield	417	15.8	
Green	Gary David Macnaughton	266	8.9	
Majority				
Turnout				

Blythe
Party	Candidate	Votes	%	±%
Conservative	Richard Holt	1,612	46.2	
Residents	Josh O'Nyons	1544	44.2	
Labour	Raj Singh	337	9.7	
Majority				
Turnout				

Castle Bromwich
Party	Candidate	Votes	%	±%
Conservative	Mike Robinson	1,351	42.5	
UKIP	Glen Lawrence	1244	39.1	
Labour	Ian Christopher McDonald	404	12.7	
Green	Mila Tilt	114	3.6	
Residents	Mandy Wilson	66	2.1	
Majority				
Turnout				

Chelmsley Wood
Party	Candidate	Votes	%	±%
Green	James Burn	1,334		
UKIP	Colin Archer-Richards	556		
Labour Co-op	Nick Stephens	511		
Conservative	Sally Bell	142		
Majority				
Turnout				

Dorridge & Hockley Heath
Party	Candidate	Votes	%	±%
Conservative	Ian Courts	2,320		
Green	Sara Stephens	378		
Labour	Ian Clifford English	336		
Liberal Democrats	Joan Elizabeth Hewings	290		
Majority				
Turnout				

Elmdon
Party	Candidate	Votes	%	±%
Liberal Democrats	Martin Alan Hewings	936		
UKIP	David Faulkner	915		
Conservative	Martin McCarthy	878		
Labour	Sean Thomas Madden	359		
Green	Elaine Teresa Williams	225		
Majority				
Turnout				

Kingshurst and Fordbridge
Party	Candidate	Votes	%	±%
UKIP	Debbie Evans	1,022		
Labour Co-op	David Charles Jamieson	713		
Conservative	Paul Thomas	277		
Green	Mark Frederick Wilson	128		
Liberal Democrats	Luke Worthington Richards	43		
Majority				
Turnout				

Knowle
Party	Candidate	Votes	%	±%
Conservative	Diana Holl-Allen	2,144		
Green	Roger Philip King	382		
Labour	Simon Martin Johnson	371		
Liberal Democrats	Martin Smith	218		
Majority				
Turnout				

Lyndon
Party	Candidate	Votes	%	±%
Liberal Democrats	Tony Ludlow	1,186		
Conservative	Julie Hulland	967		
Labour	Martin Lawrence Tolman	768		
Green	Rianne Ten Veen	350		
Majority				
Turnout				

Meriden
Party	Candidate	Votes	%	±%
Conservative	Ken Allsopp	1,830		
Residents	Sheila Cooper	723		
Labour	Cathy Connan	465		
Green	Carol Joy Linfield	332		
Liberal Democrats	Peter Charles Lee	280		
Majority				
Turnout				

Olton
Party	Candidate	Votes	%	±%
Liberal Democrats	John Anthony Windmill	1,478		
Conservative	Bob Grinsell	1402		
Labour	Alan Edward Jacques	462		
Green	Trevor John Barker	332		
Majority				
Turnout				

Shirley East
Party	Candidate	Votes	%	±%
Conservative	Annette McKenzie	1,211		
Liberal Democrats	Ian Doxford Hedley	828		
UKIP	Audrey Palmer Barnes	618		
Residents	Trevor Eames	363		
Labour	Kevin Peter Raven	351		
Majority				
Turnout				

Shirley South
Party	Candidate	Votes	%	±%
Green	Andy Hodgson	1,367		
Conservative	Angela Sandison	1165		
UKIP	Carole Chillcott	667		
Liberal Democrats	Charles Nicholas Leslie Robison	343		
Labour	Shirley Rose Young	190		
Majority				
Turnout				

Shirley West
Party	Candidate	Votes	%	±%
Green	Tim Hodgson	1,160		
Conservative	Brian Holmes	722		
UKIP	Cyril Millward	675		
Labour	Ray Brookes	329		
Liberal Democrats	Alex George Bashford	217		
Majority				
Turnout				

Silhill
Party	Candidate	Votes	%	±%
Conservative	Margaret Bassett	1,909		
Liberal Democrats	Ade Adeyemo	810		
Labour	Janet Mary Marsh	402		
Residents	Rebecca Hammond	190		
Green	Joy Aldworth	186		
Majority				
Turnout				

Smith's Wood
Party	Candidate	Votes	%	±%
Green	Stephen Holt	970		
UKIP	Mark Stephen Lawrence	584		
Labour	David Charles Cole	487		
Conservative	Graham Juniper	102		
Majority				
Turnout				

St Alphege
Party	Candidate	Votes	%	±%
Conservative	Stuart Davis	2,448		
Liberal Democrats	Stuart William Jameson	566		
Residents	John Rogers	384		
Labour	Paul Cook Tuxworth	348		
Green	Emily Ann Marsay	244		
Majority				
Turnout				
