= Adventure Activities Licensing Authority =

Licensing authority for outdoor activity centres for young people in Great Britain

The Adventure Activities Licensing Authority (AALA) is the licensing authority for outdoor activity centres for young people in Great Britain. Since 2007 it has been part of the Health and Safety Executive (HSE), the government body charged with overseeing health and safety in all workplaces. AALA inspect and issue licences to providers. These licences give an assurance that, so far as is reasonably practicable, participants and employees can be 'safe'.

== Creation ==
The AALA was created following the Lyme Bay canoeing tragedy in March, 1993 which involved a commercial organisation assuming responsibility for children's safety. A group of eight pupils and their teacher were accompanied by two instructors from an outdoor centre on the south coast of England. As a result of a series of errors, four of the teenagers drowned. The subsequent trial resulted in the prosecution of the parent company and the centre manager. The government initially resisted changing legislation until David Jamieson, the Member of Parliament for Plymouth Devonport, who represented the parents of the children who died, introduced a Private Member's Bill which in January 1995 became the Activity Centres (Young Persons’ Safety) Act 1995. In January 1995 an independent licensing authority, the AALA, was created to bring the act into reality.

== Scope ==
The activities within the scope of the licensing scheme are:

- caving (except in caves principally used as show-places open to the public)
- climbing (climbing, traversing, abseiling and scrambling activities except on purpose-built climbing walls or abseiling towers)
- trekking (walking, running, pony trekking, mountain biking, off-piste skiing and related activities when done in moor- or mountain-country above 600 metres and which is remote, i.e. over 30 minutes travelling time from the nearest road or refuge)
- watersports (canoeing, rafting, sailing and related activities when done on the sea, tidal waters or larger non-placid inland waters).

== Future ==
On 15 October 2012, Lord Young of Graffham, recommended that the AALA be abolished and the existing statutory licensing regime be replaced by a code of practice.

The January 2016 update from the AALA reported that "... responsibility for the Adventure Activities Licensing Authority (AALA) is likely to move from the Department for Work and Pensions (DWP) to Department for Digital, Culture, Media and Sport (DCMS) ..."
