= List of neighborhoods in Paterson, New Jersey =

Populated place in Passaic County, New Jersey, US

The following is a list of neighborhoods in Paterson, in the U.S. state of New Jersey.

- Lower Eastside
- Near Eastside
- Unity Square Park
- Totowa Section
  - Union Avenue
- Hillcrest
- Old Great Falls Historic District
- Stoney Road
- South Paterson
- Lakeview
- Manor Section
- Eastside Park Historic District
- Sandy Hill
- People's Park
  - 21st Avenue
- Riverside
- Bunker Hill
- Downtown
  - The Central Business District
  - Old Dublin District
  - Little Italy
  - Little Lima
- Wrigley Park
- Northside
