= Andrew Derrom =

American politician

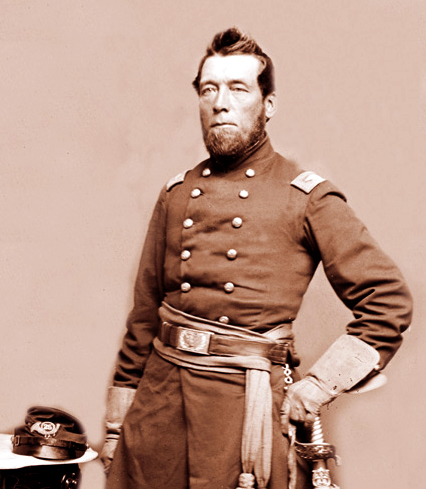
- Colonel Andrew Derrom
- Born: November 30, 1817; United Kingdom of Great Britain and Ireland
- Died: July 15, 1892 (aged 74); Paterson, New Jersey, United States
- Burial place: Cedar Lawn Cemetery
- Military career
- Allegiance: United States
- Branch: Army of the Potomac
- Service years: 1862–1863
- Rank: Colonel
- Commands: 25th New Jersey Volunteer Infantry Regiment
- Conflicts: American Civil War: Battle of Fredericksburg; "Mud March"; Siege of Suffolk

Andrew Derrom (November 30, 1817 – July 15, 1892) was an English-American civil engineer, industrialist, inventor, and military officer.

== Early life and education ==
Derrom was the second of six children born to Richard Derrom, a member of the British army originally from Manchester, England, and Mary (Winders) Derrom, originally from Leeds. He accompanied his father when Richard was stationed to Malta, Corfu, and Cephalonia. In Cephalonia, Derrom began his schooling with both private instructors and religious missionaries in Greece. He also met Lord Byron, who at the time was outfitting a fleet on Cephalonia to participate in the Greek War of Independence against the Ottoman Empire. When the Greek war began in earnest in 1824, Derrom was sent to Plymouth to begin formal schooling, eventually moving to grammar schools in Glasgow and Derry, Ireland, where his father had been stationed as a member of the civil service, followed by mathematics studies in Deal, England.

== Immigration to the United States ==
Derrom immigrated to the United States in 1836 at the age of 18, eventually settling in Paterson, New Jersey, where he worked as a civil engineer, surveyor, and builder. By 1844, Derrom had opened his own construction business, employing up to 400 workers. His business grew over the next fifteen years into one of the largest building firms in the state.

== Civil War ==
When the Civil War began in 1861, Derrom became a supporter of the Union cause. When President Abraham Lincoln called for volunteers to the Union Army in 1862, Derrom conducted a volunteer drive in Paterson and filled the city's volunteer quota in three days. Derrom originally hoped that a regiment of Passaic County volunteers would be led by a citizen from the county, but when that failed, Derrom lobbied Charles Smith Olden, the governor of New Jersey, to form a regiment of five companies from Paterson with five companies from southern New Jersey. Olden agreed, and when the 25th New Jersey Volunteer Infantry Regiment was formed, Derrom was elected colonel of the regiment.

During their existence between September 1, 1862, to June 20, 1863, the 25th New Jersey Volunteer Infantry Regiment fought in several engagements as part of the Army of the Potomac. These engagement included the Union loss in the Battle of Fredericksburg and the inconclusive Siege of Suffolk. Despite the losses, Derrom was cited by several of his superiors for exemplary engineering and bridge-building assignments, although his name now appears in Civil War databases incorrectly as "Andrew Derron".

== Business ventures ==
When his original nine-month term of service with the New Jersey 25th ended, Derrom returned to Paterson but intended to rejoin the volunteers when they reformed. To his surprise, however, Derrom found his business interests in Paterson in complete disarray, which forced him to remain in the city. Derrom spent the next three years restoring the financial stability of his business while also building some of the largest textile mills in the "Silk City".

Derrom was also known as an inventor. He created a system of building in sections that allowed his construction teams to complete a section before transporting it and setting it up in place after transport, which modern authors have described as an early version of the mobile home. Derrom himself called it the "Derrom Cottage", whose component parts could be moved from place to place with relative ease. The smallest Derrom Cottage cost $25 in 1870 (roughly $440 in 2016 dollars), while his largest models (the "Italian villas") cost $5,000 (roughly $88,000 in 2016 dollars).

Derrom was able to weather the Panic of 1873, a financial crisis that led to a six-year depression in the United States and much of Western Europe, by selling the Derrom Cottage to the United States Army and to home builders in Venezuela. Derrom himself traveled to Venezuela and worked for four years as a supervisor and architect of Derrom Cottage projects in Caracas, Venezuela.

== Civic improvement ==
When he returned to Paterson in 1879, and with the success of the Derrom Cottage making him a wealthy man, Derrom began purchasing large portions of the Eastside section of Paterson, and eventually owned a 66-acre parcel of the city. Derrom was able to develop this section of the city to his own design, including dividing lots for sale, laying out streets, building houses (accordingly many Derrom Cottages), and building his own mansion and club house in 1880.

The next year, city leaders decided to establish a public parks system for all of Paterson, but a city ordinance authorizing the purchasing of land in the city's Eastside and Westside took seven more years to be enacted, with the first land purchased by the city being Colonel Derrom's 66-acre property for $75,000. This property would eventually become Eastside Park, and the surrounding neighborhood became the Eastside Park Historic District. Derrom would support the city's construction of other parks throughout the city, including People's Park and Westside Park. As a politician, Derrom served as a city alderman, president of the city council, president of the board of education, and superintendent of public schools. He originally identified himself as a member of the Whig Party, and when that party dissolved in 1854, Derrom became a member of the newly formed Republican Party.

== Family life, death and legacy ==
In 1842, Derrom married Elizabeth Vreeland, whose family was one of the oldest families to settle in Bergen County and the area around what would become Paterson. Her name is memorialized through Vreeland Avenue, formerly known as York Road in Paterson's Eastside area. The couple would have four children: Andrew, James, Mary, and Elizabeth. Both the younger Andrew and James would follow their father into careers as supervising architects, and both would become directors of the family's Derrom Building Company. Derrom also adopted a daughter named Jane ("Jennie").

In 1892, Colonel Derrom was invited to serve as the grand marshal of Paterson's Fourth of July parade over some of the streets he had once surveyed and others he had built himself, but old age and illness prevented him from walking the route. Instead Derrom decided to sit in an open carriage over the parade route. His condition deteriorated steadily over the next two weeks, and Derrom died on July 15, 1892, at the age of 74. He is buried in Cedar Lawn Cemetery in Paterson next to his wife Elizabeth, who had died in 1883.

In recognition of his role in developing much of the Eastside and Eastside Park areas of the city, civic leaders named the street on the west border of Eastside Park "Derrom Avenue". This wide, four-block boulevard runs north and south, connecting Martin Luther King Way (Broadway) and Park Avenue, and is home to several imposing mansions that were built by many of the industrialists whose mills and factories were constructed by the Derrom Building Company.
