= Eastside, Paterson =

Populated place in Passaic County, New Jersey, US

Paterson
neighborhoods
– Totowa Section
– Hillcrest
– Great Falls Historic District
– Stoney Road
– South Paterson
– Lakeview
– Near Eastside
– Manor Section
– Eastside Park Historic District
– Sandy Hill
– People's Park
– Riverside
– Downtown
– The Central Business District
– The Old Dublin District
– Little Italy
– Wrigley Park
– Northside

Eastside is a neighborhood in Paterson, New Jersey, in the U.S. state of New Jersey. It is bordered by South Paterson, Downtown Paterson, Riverside and the Passaic River It is bound by 10th Avenue and Montgomery Street to the north, Straight Street to the west, Interstate 80 to the south and the river to the east. It is Paterson's largest neighborhood and includes the smaller neighborhoods of Sandy Hill, People's Park, Eastside Park Historic District and the Manor Section. Eastside is a mostly residential area with commercial centers along 33rd Street and Broadway. It is also home to Eastside Park, Paterson's largest park.

== Sandy Hill ==
40°54′44.1″N 74°9′45.8″W

Sandy Hill is a neighborhood located roughly west of Madison Avenue, north of Cedar Street, south of Market Street and east of Straight Street. Due to Paterson's significant population turn-over, this neighborhood is now home to a large Hispanic community, mostly first-generation Dominicans. The Sandy Hill section of Paterson is located in the city's 5th Ward. Roberto Clemente Park, which was originally known as Sandy Hill Park is located in this neighborhood.
