= Hispanics and Latinos in New Jersey =

Ethnic groups in New Jersey, US

The U.S. state of New Jersey is home to significant and growing numbers of people of Hispanic and Latino descent, who in 2024 represented a Census-estimated 23.5% of the state's total population (nearly 2.23 million). New Jersey's Latino population comprises substantial concentrations of Dominican Americans, Puerto Rican Americans, Cuban Americans, Mexican Americans, Central Americans, Peruvian Americans, Colombian Americans, and Ecuadorian Americans. New Jersey is also home to a large Brazilian American and Portuguese-speaking population.

The state has multiple municipalities with Hispanic-majority populations. Latinos and Hispanics form one-third of the population in the largest city, Newark settling in the Forest Hill, Broadway and Mount Pleasant neighborhoods which comprise mostly of Puerto Ricans and Dominicans. The northern part of Hudson County has been nicknamed Havana on the Hudson for the large number of Cuban exiles and émigrés living there. Little Lima, in Paterson, is the largest Peruvian enclave outside of South America.

Many Latino and Hispanic people have been elected to public office in New Jersey, at both the state and local levels.

== Places and populations ==
Bar Chart of Race & Ethnicity in New Jersey (2015)

Municipalities of New Jersey with majority Hispanic populations as of the 2010 United States census are:

=== Places with over 100,000 people ===
- Elizabeth (65.72%, 2020)
- Paterson (61.89%, 2020) which includes the neighborhoods of Little Lima and La Ventiuno

=== Places with between 25,000 and 100,000 people ===
- Camden (52.81%, 2020)
- North Bergen (70.86%, 2020)
- Passaic (71.0%)
- Perth Amboy (78.1%)
- Plainfield (54.58%, 2020)
- Union City (84.7%)
- West New York (78.1%)
- New Brunswick (56.77%, 2020)

=== Places with between 10,000 and 25,000 people ===
- Dover (69.4%)
- Fairview (54.6%)
- Guttenberg (64.8%)
- Bound Brook (2020, 53.17%)

=== Places with fewer than 10,000 people ===
- East Newark (61.4%)
- Prospect Park (52.1%)
- Silver Lake (55.3%)
- Victory Gardens (63.0%)

== Center for Hispanic Policy, Research and Development ==
The New Jersey Department of Community Affairs Center for Hispanic Policy, Research and Development is designed to empower the Hispanic community of New Jersey by administering grant dollars and providing other assistance to Hispanic community-based organizations, creating training and employment opportunities for Hispanic college interns, conducting and supporting research on New Jersey's Hispanic community, and ensuring Hispanic access to services and programs.

== Public officeholders ==
There are officeholders of Latino background throughout the state.

=== Statewide ===
- Esther Salas, federal district judge for the United States District Court for the District of New Jersey
- Faustino J. Fernandez-Vina, Associate Justice New Jersey Supreme Court
- Roberto A. Rivera-Soto, Associate Justice New Jersey Supreme Court

=== US Congress ===
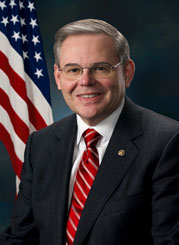
Bob Menendez

- Bob Menendez, United States Senator
- Albio Sires, Member of the United States House of Representatives 13th congressional district

=== State Legislators ===
- Marlene Caride (1963), 36th Legislative District.
- Gabriela M. Mosquera, State Assemblywoman, 4th Legislative District
- Nilsa Cruz-Perez, State Senator, 5th District
- Maria Rodriguez-Gregg, State Assemblywoman, 8th Legislative District
- Annette Quijano, State Assemblywomen 20th Legislative District
- Teresa Ruiz, State Senator, 29th Legislative District
- Eliana Pintor Marin, State Assemblywomen 29th Legislative District
- Vincent Prieto, State Assemblyman 32nd legislative district, Speaker of Assembly
- Angelica M. Jimenez, State Assemblywomen 32nd Legislative District
- Ruben J. Ramos, State Assemblyman, 33rd legislative district
- Caridad Rodriguez, State Assemblywoman 33rd Legislative District
- Nellie Pou, State Senator, 35th Legislative District
- Location map of Hudson County, New Jersey
  Kristin Corrado, State Senator, 40th Legislative District

=== Hudson ===
- Eliu Rivera, Freeholder District 4
- Rudy Garcia, appointed mayor of Union City

=== Newark ===
The percentage of Latinos in Newark, the most populous city in New Jersey, grew considerably between 1980 and 2010, from 18.6% to 33.8%; that of blacks has slightly decreased from 58.2% to 52.4%. Hispanics or Latinos of any race were 33.83% (93,746) or one-third of the population, of which 13% of the total population was Puerto Rican. While municipal elections have seen black-Latino coalitions, voting tends to remain racially polarized.

- Luis A. Quintana
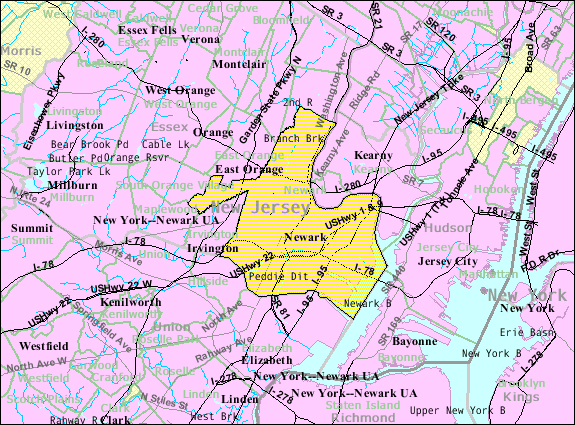
  Census Bureau map of Newark, New Jersey
- Teresa Ruiz

=== Passaic ===
- Hector Carlos Lora
- Jose "Joey" Torres
- Julio Tavarez, Councilmember representing 5th Ward in the City of Paterson, New Jersey
- Bernice Toledo, Passaic County Surrogate Court Judge and New Jersey State Superior Court Deputy Clerk. Elected in 2011. Re-elected in 2016.

=== Bergen ===
- Carlos Rendo, Mayor of Woodcliff Lake
- Anthony R. Suarez, served as Mayor of Ridgefield, New Jersey

=== Middlesex ===
- Joseph Vas
- Wilda Diaz

=== Union ===
- Angel Estrada
- Annette Quijano

=== South Jersey ===
- Nilsa Cruz-Perez
- Carmen G. Rodriguez, Camden County Freeholder

== Sports and arts ==
- Carol-Lynn Parente, executive producer of Sesame Street (Puerto Rican-American)
- Franck de Las Mercedes, visual artist (Nicaraguan American)
- Tab Ramos, US national soccer team player (Uruguayan American)

== Demographics ==
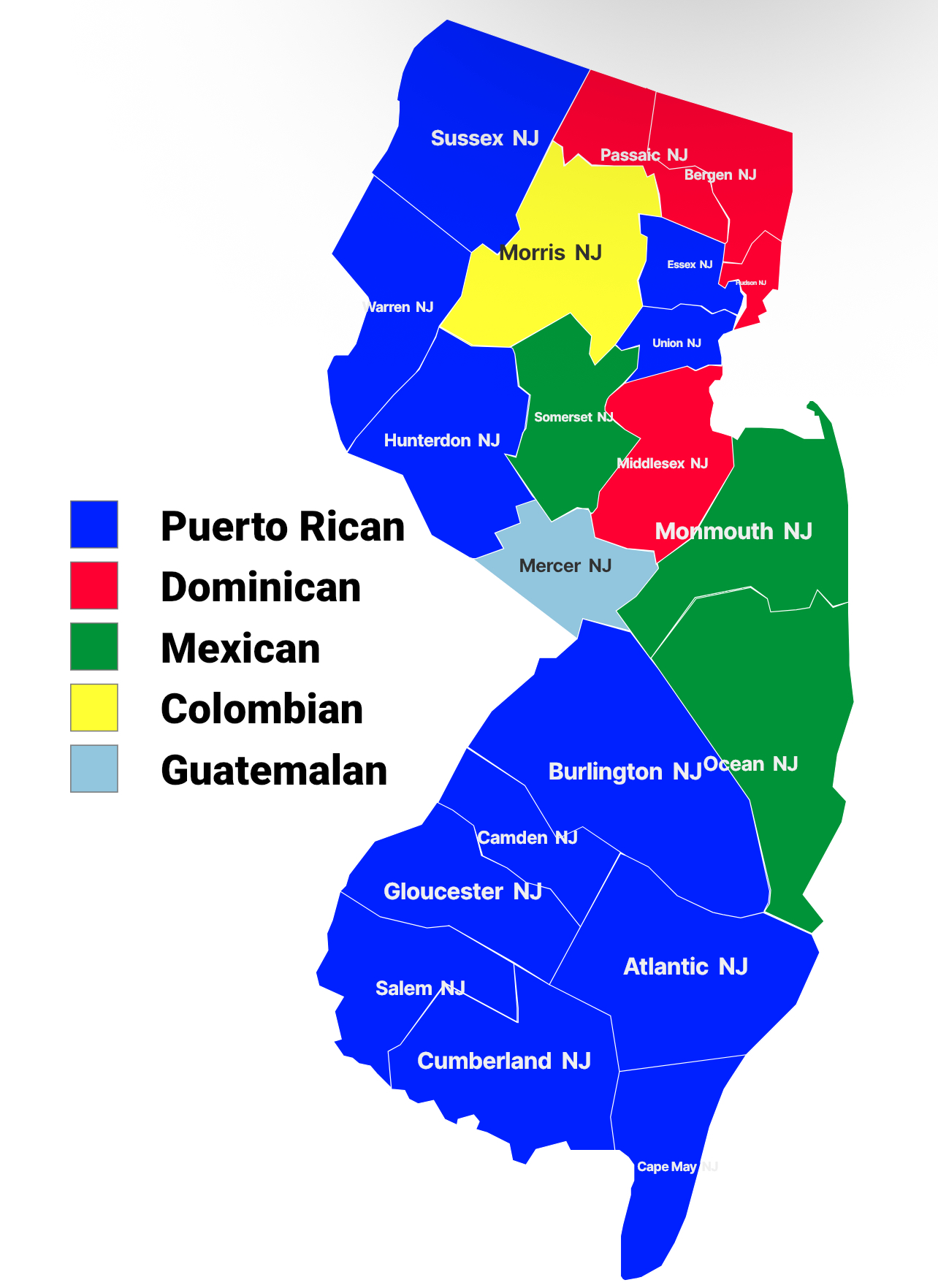
Largest Hispanic ancestry in New Jersey by county, per the 2020 census

Ancestry by origin (2024)	Number	%
Puerto Rican	484,119	
Dominican	389,580	
Mexican	270,758	
Ecuadorian	185,266	
Colombian	164,808	
Guatemalan	107,164	
Peruvian	106,013	
Cuban	96,396	
Salvadoran	94,403	

== See also ==
- Hispanic and Latino community of Camden, New Jersey
