= Havana on the Hudson =

Nickname for the northern part of Hudson County, New Jersey, US

Havana on the Hudson is a nickname for the northern part of Hudson County, in the U.S. state of New Jersey. The name is derived from the Cuban capital Havana and from northern Hudson County's geographic proximity to the Hudson River.

During the latter half of the 20th century, Cuban émigrés and exiles left their country and relocated to Union City, West New York, and surrounding communities in search of economic opportunity and political freedom. Although the area during this period became significantly influenced by Cuban culture, over the course of the decades that followed, many Cubans spread into adjacent towns and many other Hispanic groups also moved into the area, resulting in a widespread and diverse Latino culture, commerce and identity that is non-exclusive of any people of Hispanic descent, though Cubans remain a powerful voting bloc. Numerous towns on the Hudson Palisades in northern Hudson and southeast Bergen counties have populations where more than 50% of the residents are foreign-born, often with a Hispanic majority. Some of its towns are among the most densely populated in the U.S.—three of which (Guttenberg, Union City, and West New York) are the top three most densely populated municipalities in New Jersey.

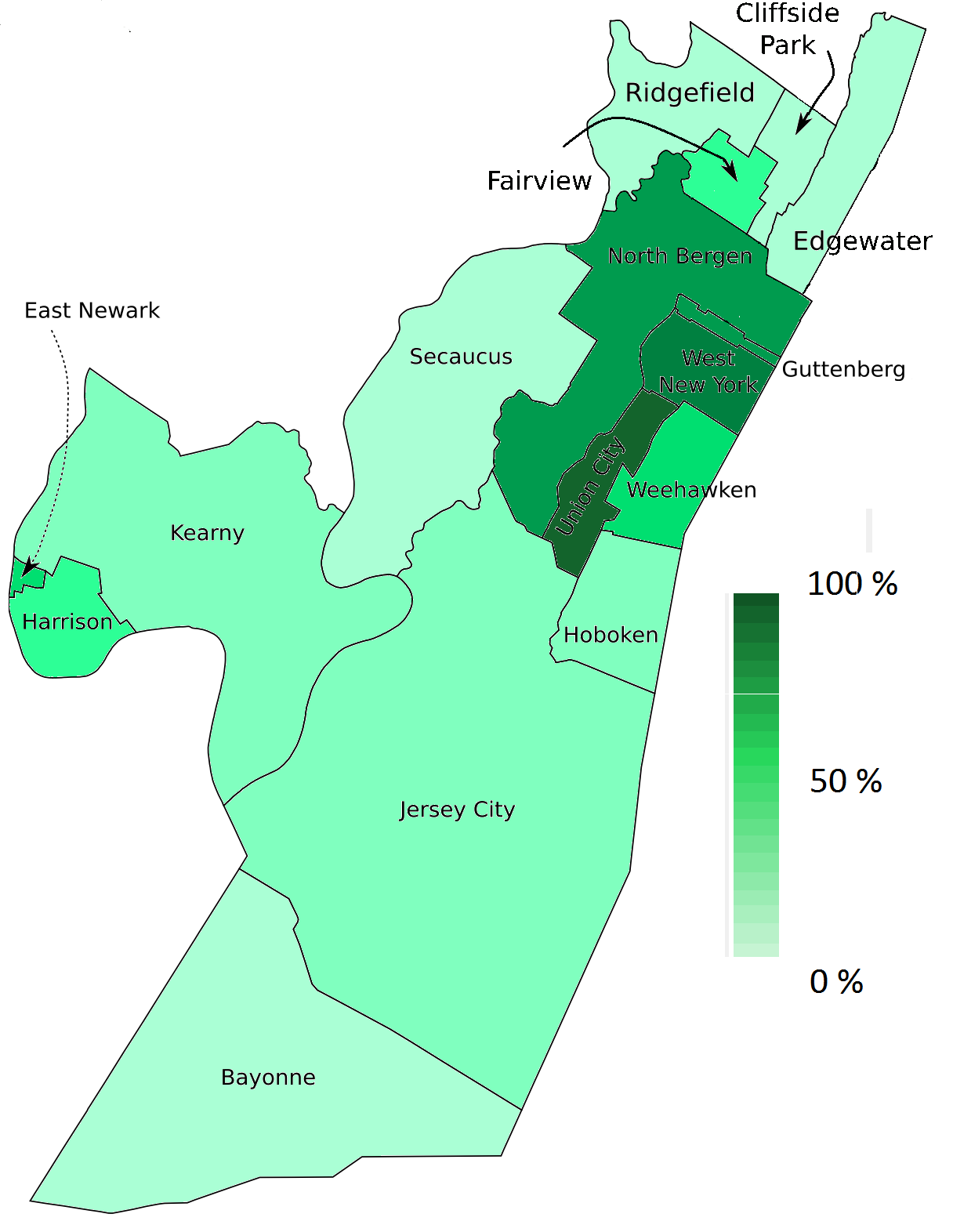
Hudson and southeast Bergen showing percentage of Hispanic population per town

== History ==
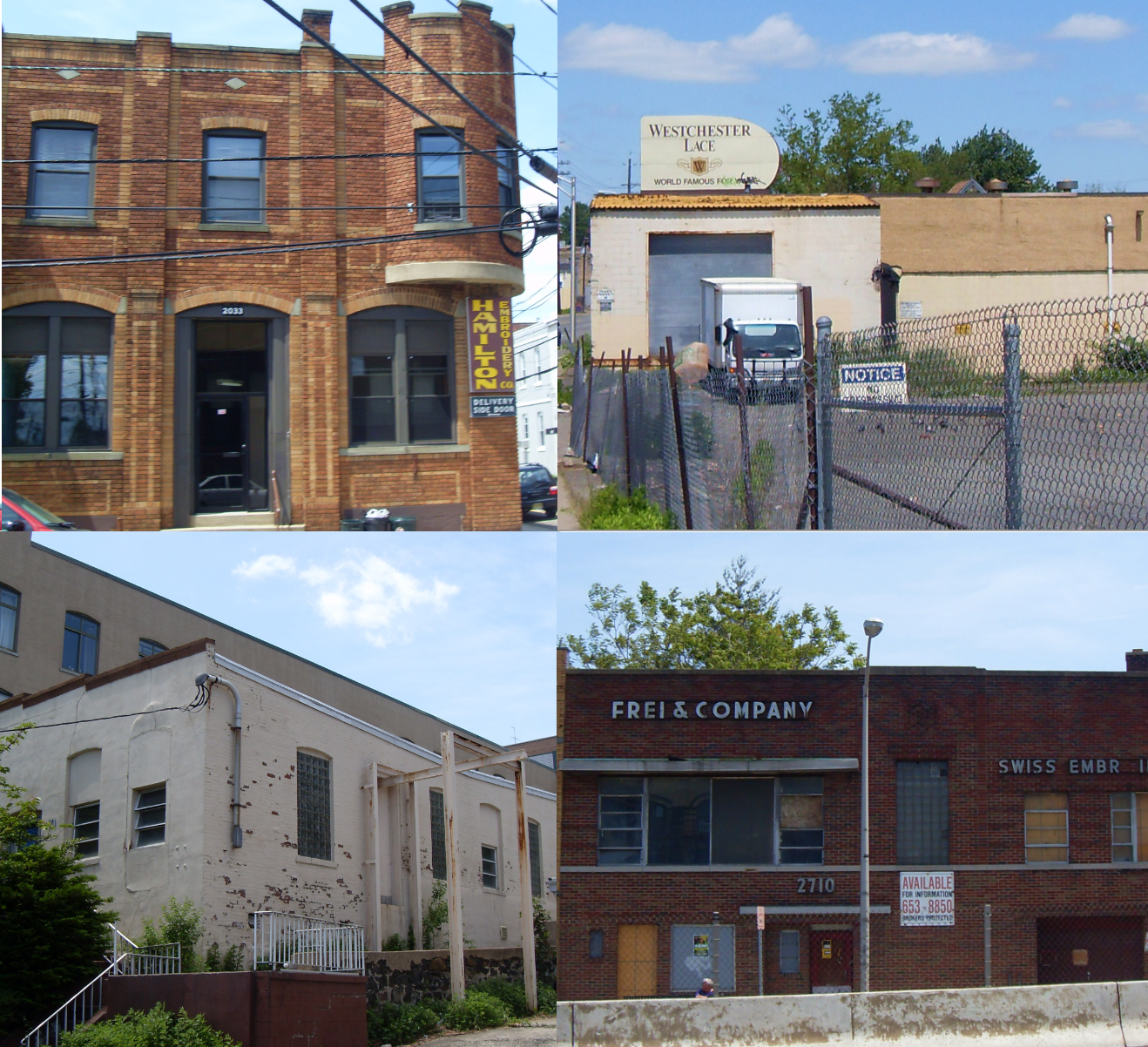
Former embroidery shops in North Hudson

Prior to the Cuban Revolution, approximately 150,000 Cubans lived in the United States, with concentrations in New York City and in Key West and Tampa in Florida. There was a small community of about 2,000 people living in Union City, who had originally arrived after the 1940s, many from Fomento or the semi-rural province of Villa Clara. North Hudson had urbanized and seen massive population growth in the early 20th century and was considered to be the Embroidery Capital of America, due to that and other textile industries which had been developed by the German speaking immigrants who dominated around the start of the 20th century and were later followed by waves of Irish, Slavs, Jews, Middle Easterners and Italians. By the 1960s, North Hudson was feeling the shift in demographics as urban decline and post-war prosperity of the 1950s led to greater suburbanization in New Jersey. Relatively stable, the population was decreasing. In many ways, influx of new residents led to a changing of the guard that helped save the area from the more severe downward spiral being experienced in older urban areas throughout the New York metropolitan area.

== Immigration ==
=== First wave ===
In the second half of the 20th century, several hundred thousand Cubans of all social classes have emigrated to the United States. In the immediate aftermath of the Cuban Revolution, an initial exodus of over "golden exiles", so-called because they were affluent professionals and members of the Batista regime, left that country for fear of reprisals by the new government. By 1962, when air travel between the two nations was suspended, 200,000 of them had emigrated. Another 300,000 "Varaderos" emigrated when some flights resumed from Cuba's Varadero Beach between 1965 and 1973. The first stop for these people was Miami, Florida, one of the closest American cities to Cuba. Many of these Cubans left in the hope that they would soon return home upon the imminent overthrowing of Castro's regime, a day that never came.

The convenience to New York, economic potential, family connections, the possibility of home ownership, and a chance to replant a tight-knit community may have been the initial attraction for emigres who were forced to flee. As they moved into the area, they were able to purchase homes and business from those inclined to leave for the suburbs. Hudson County was the preferred destination for many immigrants and soon became the main center for Cuban American culture. Union City had opportunities offered by the embroidery industry. According to author Lisandro Perez, Miami was not particularly attractive to Cubans prior to the 1960s. A short-lived team, the Jersey City Jerseys, composed of players from the Havana Sugar Kings, made Roosevelt Stadium in Union City their home.

By 2006, Hudson County was the nucleus of the state's Cuban community, which numbered 100,000 people.

=== Freedom Flights ===
Following the Cuban Missile Crisis, then-president John F. Kennedy imposed travel restrictions on February 8, 1963, and the Cuban Assets Control Regulations were issued on July 8, 1963, under the Trading with the Enemy Act in response to Cubans hosting Soviet nuclear weapons. Under these restrictions, Cuban assets in the United States were frozen and the existing restrictions were consolidated in an embargo, known as el bloqueo, Spanish for blockade. Those who wished to leave Cuba were considered refugees, and were offered alien resident status in a US sponsored resettlement program transported on what became known as Freedom Flights (1965–1974). As they were unable to take any assets or personal belongings this often was only possible for those with friends, family, or sponsors in the United States and the path to citizenship. (Children born in the USA automatically became US citizens).

=== Immigration liberalization ===
Immigration and Nationality Act of 1965 changed long-held immigration policies saw new immigration from non-European nations which changed the ethnic make-up of the United States. Immigration doubled between 1965 and 1970, and doubled again between 1970 and 1990. The most dramatic effect was to shift immigration from Europe to Asia and Central and South America. James Hughes, a professor of urban planning at Rutgers University, was quoted in The New York Times as saying that changes made to immigration laws in 1964 were responsible for much of the influx of Hispanic immigrants to the county.

=== Marielitos ===
The Mariel boatlift was a mass exodus of Cubans who departed from Cuba's Mariel Harbor for the United States between April 15 and October 31, 1980. Some of these refugees, who had departed on makeshift boats and rafts recovered by the Coast Guard eventually made it to North Hudson. On September 9, 1994, the U.S. and Cuban governments agreed to a Quota system in which the American government would grant at least 20,000 visas annually in exchange for Cuba's pledge to prevent further unlawful departures by rafters.

== Political affiliation ==
=== Anti-Castro sentiment ===
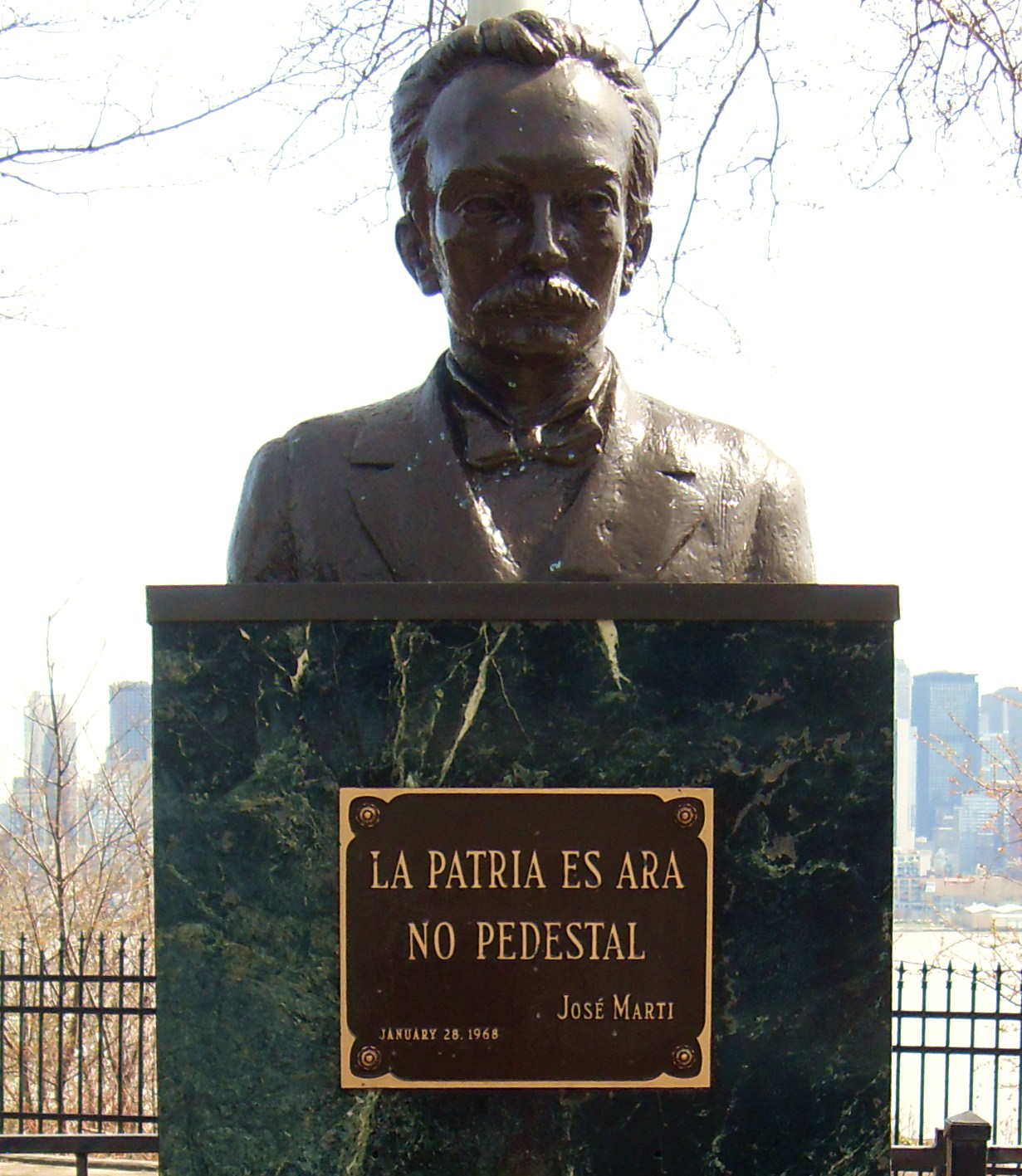
Monument to José Martí on Boulevard East LA PATRIA ES ARA NO PEDESTAL ("The Homeland is an Altar Not a Pedestal")

During the 1970s and 1980s, Jose Miguel Battle, Sr. (c. 1930–2007), a Bay of Pigs Invasion operative who became known as "Godfather of the Cuban mafia", for many years operated in Hudson County. Omega 7, a paramilitary group dedicated to Castro's overthrow, had membership and operations in Hudson County. Other para-military groups also operated in the area.

Although Cuban Americans are not the largest Hispanic or Latino political group in New Jersey, they are considered the most politically successful, owing to their loyalty in elections, and the way in which they pay close attention to matters pertaining to Cuba–United States relations, such as the Wet feet, dry feet policy, or the Elián González custody dispute in 2000, a phenomenon that has been attributed to a greater cohesion among members of political migrations compared to economic ones. Whereas Cuban Floridians tend to vote for Republican candidates, those in New Jersey mostly vote Democrat, which makes them an influential voting block in the Garden State. Among the most prominent of these immigrants was Bob Menendez, who got his early start in politics through Union City Mayor William Musto. After Menendez turned on Musto, who was convicted for corruption, Menendez became mayor himself, casting himself as progressive on social issues with a hard-line stances on matters related to Castro that rivaled those of Republicans.

The Cuban Democracy Act was a bill presented by U.S. Congressman Robert Torricelli (D-NJ 9th CD) and passed in 1992 which prohibited foreign-based subsidiaries of U.S. companies from trading with Cuba, travel to Cuba by U.S. citizens, and family remittances to Cuba. The act was passed as “A bill to promote a peaceful transition to democracy in Cuba through the application of sanctions directed at the Castro government and support for the Cuban people." The act stated that "[t]he government of Fidel Castro has demonstrated consistent disregard for internationally accepted standards of human rights and for democratic values” adding "[t]here is no sign that the Castro regime is prepared to make any significant concessions to democracy or to undertake any form of democratic opening."

The Helms-Burton Act (1996) further restricted interaction with Cuba, but effective May 10, 1999, with CFR Title 31 Part 515, was amended. Presidents Bill Clinton and George W. Bush both signed a provision allowing for a waiver of the law. In April 2009 a ban on travel and the sending of money and medicine to Cuba was lifted by Barack Obama.

=== Changing policy and attitudes ===
Support for the United States embargo against Cuba (aka el bloqueo, or "the blockade") was a stance held for many years, particularly exiles, and less so by their children. There still remains resistance to normalization of relations with or support of the Cuban government. At the 2009 opening of the Union City High School, a band that had played in a peace concert in Havana was scratched from the program. and rallies against it are still organized. At the same time, while Hispanics have become the largest minority in the United States, often they do not present a solid front. Younger generations can often hold differing opinions than their earlier immigrant counterparts.

== Cultural impact ==
=== Public office ===
To vote and hold public office in the United States one must be a U.S. citizen. The lower Hudson Palisades region has become one of the parts of the country with the highest rates of foreign-born residents. Nonetheless, there are several politicians of Latin American ancestry, some born abroad and some born locally, who have been elected to political office. William Musto, who served two terms as mayor of Union City, from 1962 to 1970, and from 1974 to 1982 was described by The New York Times was "a pioneer in affirmative action" for being one of the first mayors in the state to hire and promote Hispanic residents and push for bilingual education. Notable public officials from the Latino community include:

- Marlene Caride
- Zulima Farber, judge
- Rudy Garcia
- Bob Menendez, United States Senator
- Vincent Prieto, State Assemblyman 32nd legislative district
- Ruben J. Ramos, State Assemblyman, 33rd legislative district
- Eliu Rivera, Freeholder
- Caridad Rodriguez, State Assemblywoman 33rd Legislative District
- Felix Roque, Mayor of West New York
- Esther Salas, federal district judge for the United States District Court for the District of New Jersey
- Albio Sires, Member of the United States House of Representatives 8th congressional district
- Anthony R. Suarez, served as Mayor of Ridgefield, New Jersey
- Silverio Vega, Mayor of West New York. Formerly State Assemblyman 33rd legislative district

=== Streetscape ===
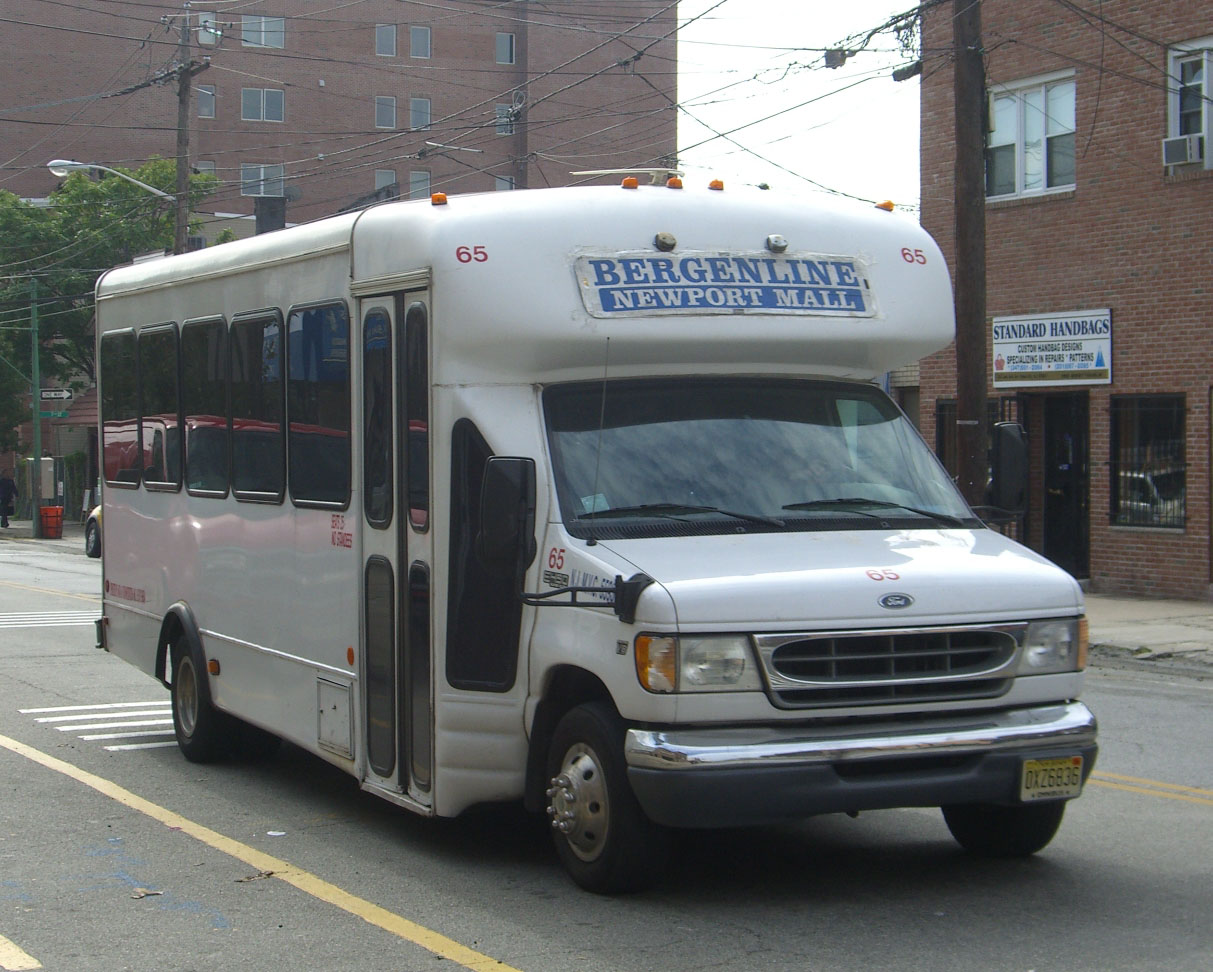
Guaguas provide an alternative to New Jersey Transit.

The Latino presence along the Hudson is most visible and palpably felt along Bergenline Avenue which runs for 90 blocks through North Hudson and continues north as Anderson Avenue into Fairview. It is along this corridor that many privately operated hail and ride minibuses, or guaguas (as called in some Caribbean countries) travel to points in Jersey City and Manhattan. Others operated by Spanish Transportation also run along the marginal road of the Lincoln Tunnel Approach and Helix between 42nd Street and Paterson, another city with a high immigrant population.

Summit Avenue near the Transfer Station is also home to a concentration of Latino businesses, as are sections of Palisade Avenue in Jersey City Heights. Marin Boulevard in Downtown Jersey City was named to honor of Luis Muñoz Marín and the large Puerto Rican population living in the neighborhood. Signage and the language are bilingual in North Hudson. While it is not uncommon to see franchised chain stores, there are still many family-run businesses throughout the area, and some mom and pop operations. Throughout the neighborhoods corner stores and bodegas are commonly found stocked with Goya Foods, the largest Hispanic-owned food company in the United States, which is headquartered in nearby Secaucus.

The area offers a variety of Latin American cuisines, including Cuban, Ecuadorian, Puerto Rican and Mexican, with such pan-Latino staples as tostones, ropa vieja and batidos, found on local menus. Local, traditionally made Cuban cigars, can also be found.

=== Annual events ===
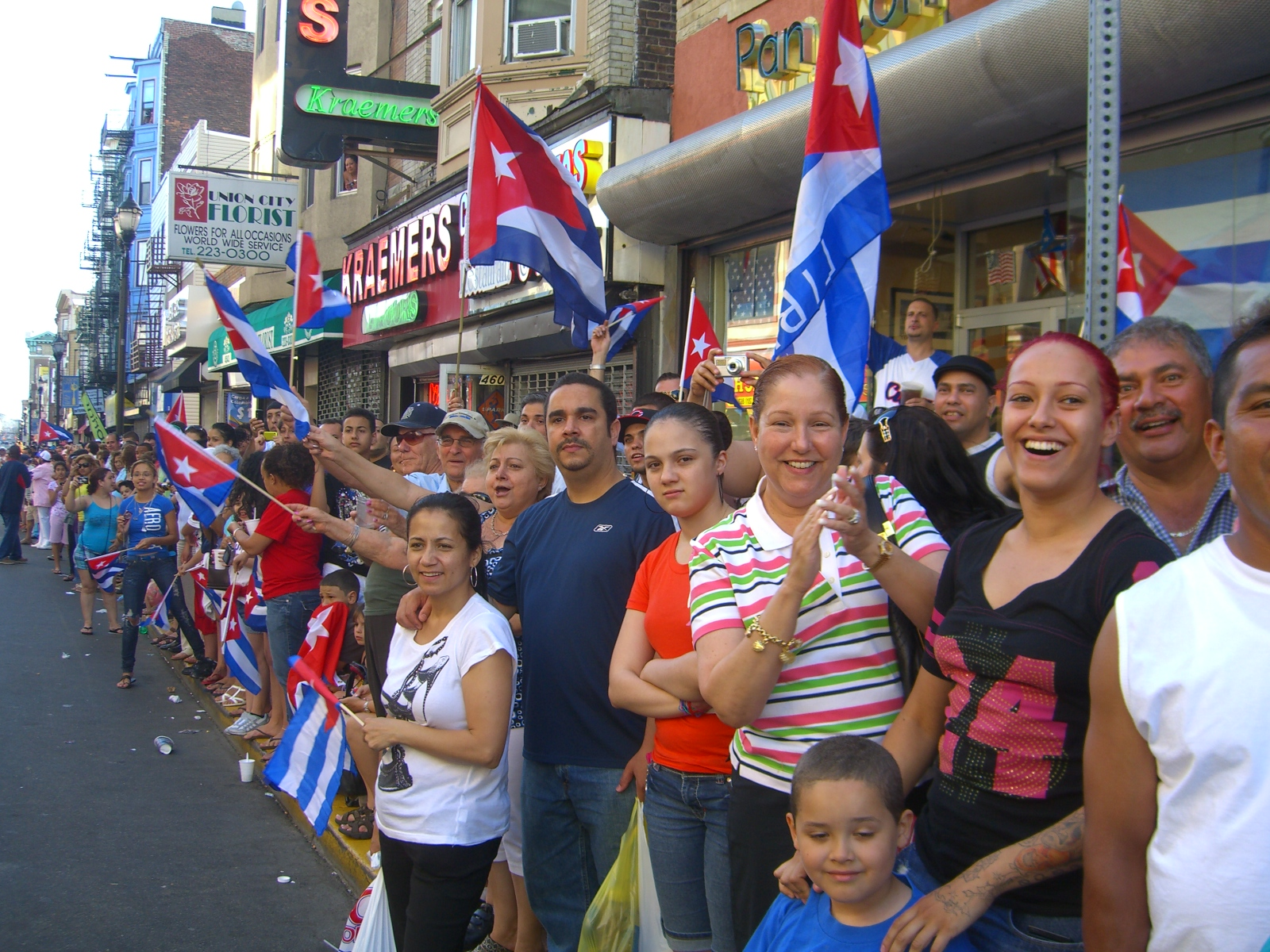
2010 Cuban Day Parade

The Cuban Day Parade of New Jersey, since its inception at the millennium, has run south along Bergenline Avenue in North Hudson County, and grown to be the centerpiece of large festivities which have taken place at Scheutzen Park and Celia Cruz Park. The latter is the centerpiece what has been called the "Walk of Fame". Dedicated to the then deceased salsa singer Celia Cruz in ceremonies attended by her husband Pedro Knight in 2004, the homage has grown to include marble stars honoring musicians and singers Tito Puente, Johnny Pacheco, Israel "Cachao" Lopez, Beny Moré, La India, and news anchor Rafael Pineda.

The longest running passion play in the United States has been performed at Union City's Park Performing Arts Center since 1931. In 1997, there was a minor controversy when an African-American actor was cast as Jesus. Three Kings Day, and important holiday in the Hispanic community, is celebrated there annually since the 1980s. The peninsular city of Bayonne, NJ is also home to an annual Hispanic Day Parade which marches through a large Latinized section of the city.

=== Media ===
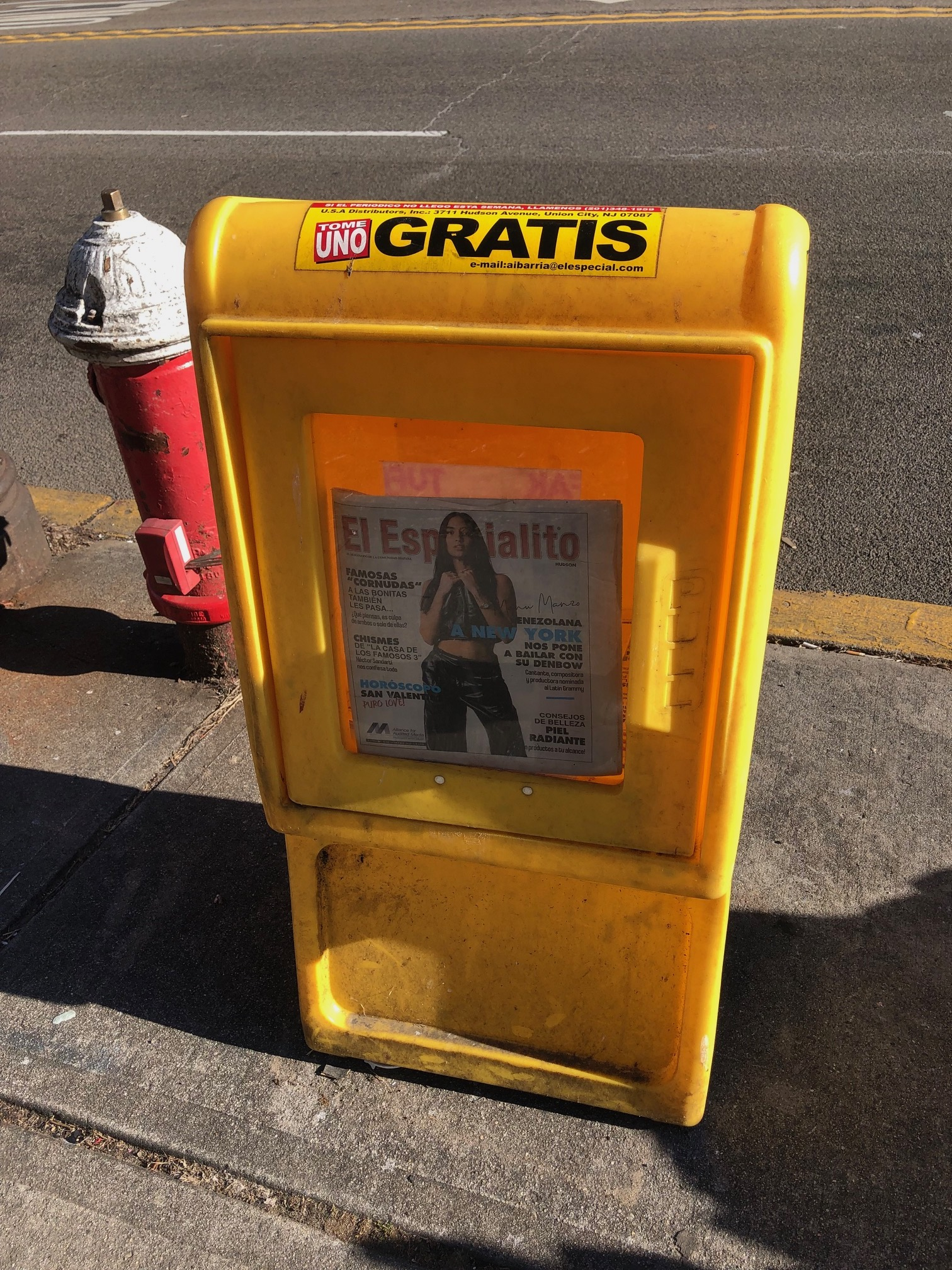
El Especialito

El Especial and El Especialito, Spanish-language weeklies targeting audiences in New Jersey, New York City and Miami, are as of 2016, based in Union City, and have a circulation in the New York metropolitan area of about 230,000. Before its closure in 1991 the Hudson Dispatch included pages in Spanish, as did the Jersey Journal. Since May 2010, a free bilingual newspaper Hudson Dispatch Weekly has served the North Hudson area. Published by the Evening Journal Association, at 30 Journal Square, one side is printed in English, and the other in Spanish under the title la comunidad. The Brooklyn-based daily, El Diario La Prensa, printed in Bogota, New Jersey is widely available.

The Spanish Broadcasting System was founded in Newark, New Jersey in 1983, by emigre Pablo Raúl Alarcón, Sr. and Raúl Alarcón, Jr., and operates Paterson-licensed WPAT. Univision WFUT and Telefutura's WXTV, a duopoly in the New York metropolitan area media market are licensed to and have their studios in northeastern New Jersey. WNJU, the flagship station of the Spanish-language Telemundo television network, is licensed to Linden and has its studios and offices in Fort Lee.

=== Arts and education ===
North Hudson is sometimes called NoHu in the visual arts community. Among those visual and performing artists and producers with a Latino background originating or living in the region are:

- Bobby Cannavale (born 1971), actor known for his roles on Ally McBeal, Third Watch, and Will & Grace.
- Joey Diaz, comedian and actor
- Paquito D'Rivera, nine-time Grammy Award–winning jazz maestro and writer
- Henry Escalante, pop musician, and one of the 15 finalists from the 2007 season of the MTV reality show Making Menudo.
- Lucio Fernandez, Union City Commissioner of Public Affairs, who is also an author, artist, actor, singer, and dancer
- Ada Ferrer (1963), historian, writer, professor
- Melissa Fumero, actress
- Erick Morillo (1971–2020), DJ and music producer
- Luis Moro (born 1964), actor, filmmaker, writer, best known for his history making-film Love and Suicide, which made him the first American to break the embargo on Cuba to film a feature there.
- Oscar Nunez, screenwriter/actor
- Carol-Lynn Parente, executive producer of Sesame Street
- Franck de Las Mercedes, folklore artist
- Caitlin Sanchez, actress

== See also ==
- Cuban Americans
- Hispanics and Latinos in New Jersey
- Alvaro de Molina
- Ironbound, a Portuguese and Brazilian enclave in Newark across the Passaic River from Harrison and Kearny
- Little Havana, Miami, Florida, Havana on the Hudson's sister city
- India Square, an Indian enclave in Jersey City
- Five Corners, a Filipino shopping district in Jersey City
- La Ventiuno, Paterson
- Little Lima
- Koreatown, Palisades Park, a Korean enclave in southeast Bergen County
- Hudson Waterfront, sometimes called Gold Coast (New Jersey)
- Gateway Region, a name for northeastern New Jersey
