= Jordanian Americans =

American citizens and nationals of Jordanian descent

Jordanian Americans الأميركيون الأردنيون
Total population
- 2020 US Census: 121,917 Jordanian-born, 2023; 88,695

Regions with significant populations
- North Jersey and Brooklyn, Washington, D.C., Bridgeview and Chicago, and Dearborn, Michigan and Metro Detroit, California, Dallas-Fort Worth Metroplex, Texas

Languages
- American English, Jordanian Arabic

Religion
- Islam (Sunni Muslims), Christianity (Greek Orthodox Christians, Catholics, and Protestant)

Related ethnic groups
- other Arab Americans

Jordanian Americans (Arabic: الأميركيون الأردنيون, romanized: al-Amīrkīyūn al-Urdunīyūn) are Americans of Jordanian descent. In 2014, the American Community Survey reported that there were 80,120 Jordanian Americans in the United States.

== History ==
=== Pre-1967 ===
The first identifiable wave of immigration from Jordan to the United States occurred after the Second World War (1945). They first settled in Chicago, (especially in the Near West and Southwest Sides sections), New York City, and the Southwest and West Coast states (i.e. California). Over 5,000 Jordanians arrived to the United States in the 1950s.

These early migrants were businessmen and doctors, many returning with their families to Jordan after several years working or studying. In those early years, people in the Jordanian East Bank and West Bank Palestinians could travel to the United States with Jordanian passports, creating the undefined category "Palestinian – Jordanian."

=== After 1967 ===
In the mid 1960s, due to a change in U.S. immigration laws and the Six-Day War, the number of Jordanians who emigrated to the United States exceeded 11,000. At this time, the majority chose to settle in Western cities and in the southwest of the country, apart from wealthy Jordanians who felt more comfortable in the suburbs of large cities. Then in the 1970s, a civil war broke out in Jordan, prompting 27,535 Jordanians to emigrate to the USA. In the 1980s, the annual number totalled 2,500. The total number of Jordanian immigrants from 1820 to 1984 was 56,720. This wave was due to internal strife in Jordan as well as economic issues. Salaries in the United States were higher than in Jordan, which incentivized workers to immigrate.

== Demography ==
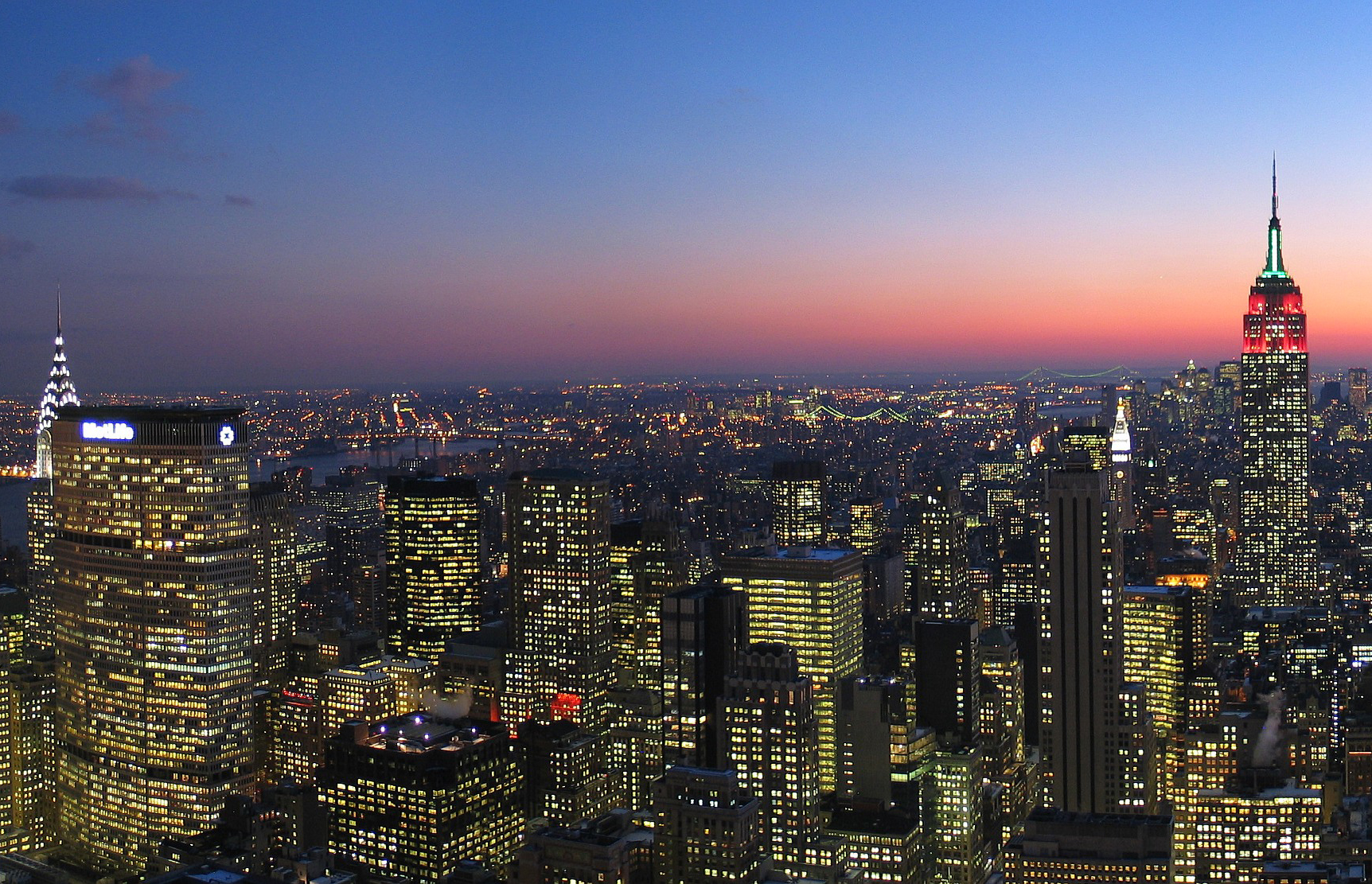
The New York City Metropolitan Area is home to the largest Jordanian population in the United States.

=== U.S cities ===
Currently, the New York City Metropolitan Area, notably including Paterson, New Jersey, attracts the highest number of legal Jordanian immigrants admitted to the United States. The Little Ramallah community of South Paterson in New Jersey is home to a rapidly growing Jordanian immigrant population. Yonkers, New York has a sizeable Jordanian population. The Jordanian American community in Washington, DC held a candlelight vigil after the death of King Hussein. Chicago also maintains, even today, a large Jordanian population.

In the time period between World War II and the 1980s, most Jordanians who emigrated to the USA were married men aged 20- 39. Many were university graduates (30%), and worked in professional positions (40%).

One difference from other Middle Eastern immigrants is that they brought their families to the US. The cohesion of these communities has hindered their Americanization. Jordanians who are fluent in English have greater interaction with the majority population. Also, immigrants from urban areas of Jordan have adapted more quickly than those from rural areas. As with other immigrant groups, children raised in the United States integrate into American society more quickly than migrant adults. Jordanians generally speak Arabic, but many also speak English.

== Employment and Economic traditions ==
Most of Jordanian Americans are professors/teachers, scientists, doctors, engineers and entrepreneurs. It is often men who will work outside the home, similar to the traditions in Jordan and many other Middle Eastern Countries. Many Jordanians will emigrate to the United States to study at university, and some of them are financially helped by the government of Jordan.

== Cuisine ==
Many cities have Jordanian restaurants such as the Petra House in Portland, Oregon. The Jordanian American diet is centered around traditional Levantine staples. Beyond celebratory feasts, the cuisine includes a variety of Mezze (small plates) such as hummus, falafel, and ''tabbouleh'', often accompanied by traditional flatbreads like ''shrak''.

== Interactions with other ethnic groups ==
Most Jordanian Americans interact with other Arabs due to cultural and linguistic affinities.

== Religion ==
The majority of Jordanian Americans are Sunni Muslims, but many others are Catholics, Greek Orthodox Christians, and to a lesser extent, Protestants and Evangelicals.

== Organizations ==
Jordanians have many organizations in the U.S., including the Jordanian American Association and the Jordanian American Association of New York. The Jordanian American Association is based in South San Francisco, and its goal is to establish social activities for the Jordanian Americans of Northern California The Jordanian American Association of New York aims to relate to Jordanian residents in different parts of the city, and to help establish relationships between them and their families in Jordan.

== See also ==
- Jordan–United States relations
