= Eastside Park (Paterson, New Jersey) =

Park in Paterson, New Jersey, United States

Coordinates: 40°54′57″N 74°8′10″W

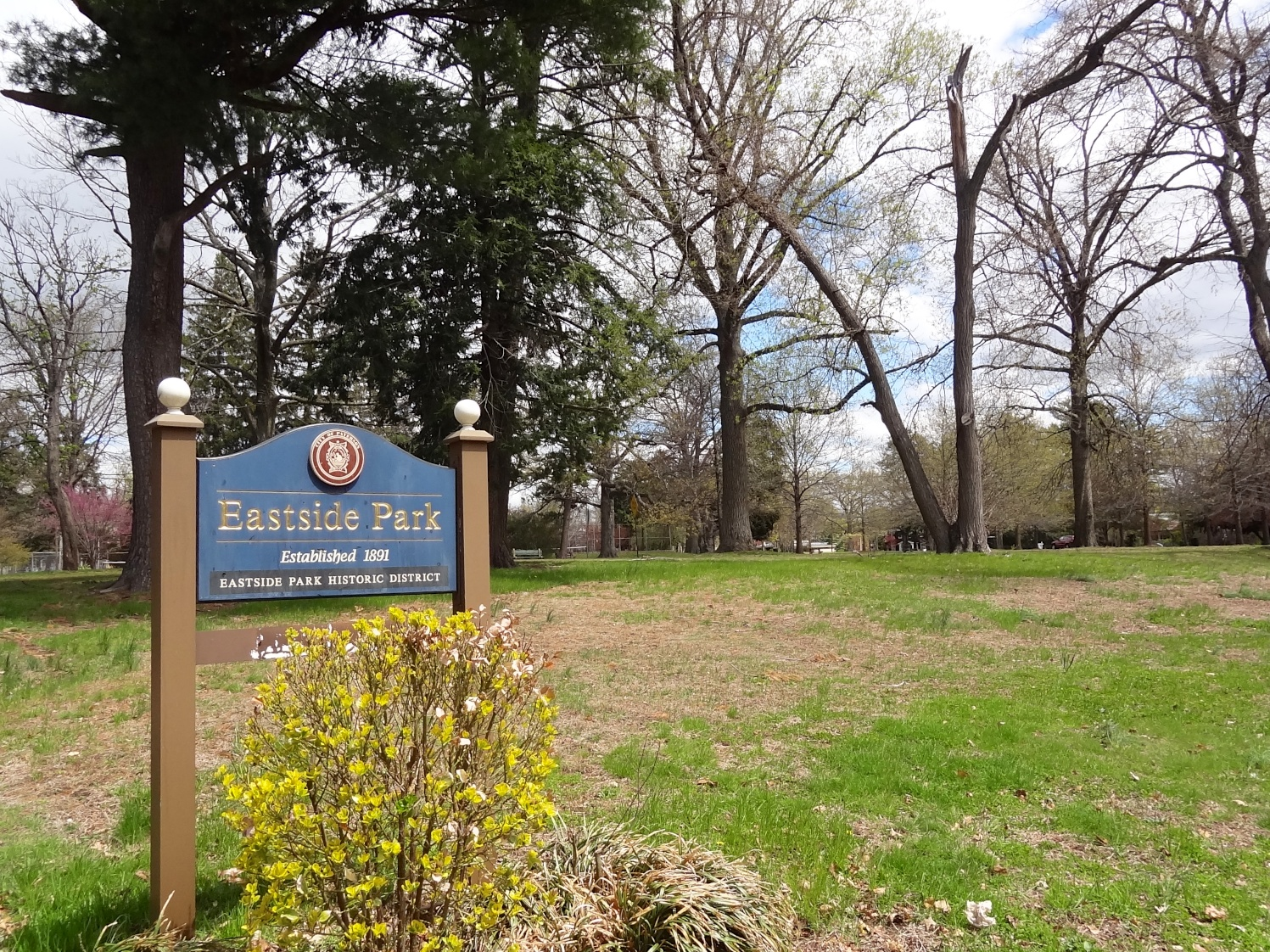
Entrance to Eastside Park

Eastside Park (originally dedicated as Washington Park, alternately referred to as East Side Park) is a park located in Paterson, New Jersey. The park is bordered by Martin Luther King, Jr. Way (Broadway) to the north, McLean Boulevard (State Route 20) to the east, Park Avenue to the south, and Derrom Avenue to the west. Eastside Park is the cornerstone of the Eastside Park Historic District, a state and nationally registered historic place added to the National Register of Historic Places on July 7, 2004.

== History ==
Eastside Park has its roots in the development plans of former Civil War Colonel Andrew Derrom, who had purchased undeveloped lands between 1868 and 1872 and built a mansion and club house in the Eastside section of the city in 1880. A year later, city leaders decided to establish a public parks system for the city, but a city ordinance authorizing the purchasing of land in the city's took seven more years to be enacted, with the first land purchased by the city being Colonel Derrom's 66-acre property for $75,000.

In 1899, Eastside Park was formally designed by John Y. Culyer, a landscape architect from New York City who served as a commissioner on the Paterson Parks Commission. Culyer's resume included serving as the assistant engineer in both the Central Park and Prospect Park developments by Frederick Law Olmsted. Ironically, Culyer was tasked with the Eastside Park project while Olmstead had won the city's Westside Park design competition, and both parks would be considered examples of the growing City Beautiful movement.

Eastside Park soon became the catalyst and anchor for the rapid development of Paterson's Eastside neighborhood, with the Eastside Park Historic District area directly adjacent to the park becoming the location of mansions built by the city's industrialists and mill owners. By 1915, the surrounding neighborhood included over 500 structures, and the park had been modified to include a stable, pavilion, arbors, and a club house. The original mansion built by Colonel Derrom had been torn down, however.

During the 20th century, the park underwent continual change, including the addition of tennis courts and the renovation of the park's baseball fields through the state Department of Environmental Protection "Green Acres" program. One of these baseball fields has since been named in honor of Larry Doby, a star athlete and graduate from nearby Eastside High School, who later became the first African-American to play in the American League, being picked up by the Cleveland Indians in 1947.

However, during these additions, some of the original pathways and structural elements were removed. The original stable and pavilion have been modified and restored, and are among the few architectural representatives of Culyer's 1899 design. The city's Eastside Neighborhood Association takes special care of the park, and often has cleaning days in the park that coincide with their annual neighborhood House Tour.

== Monuments ==
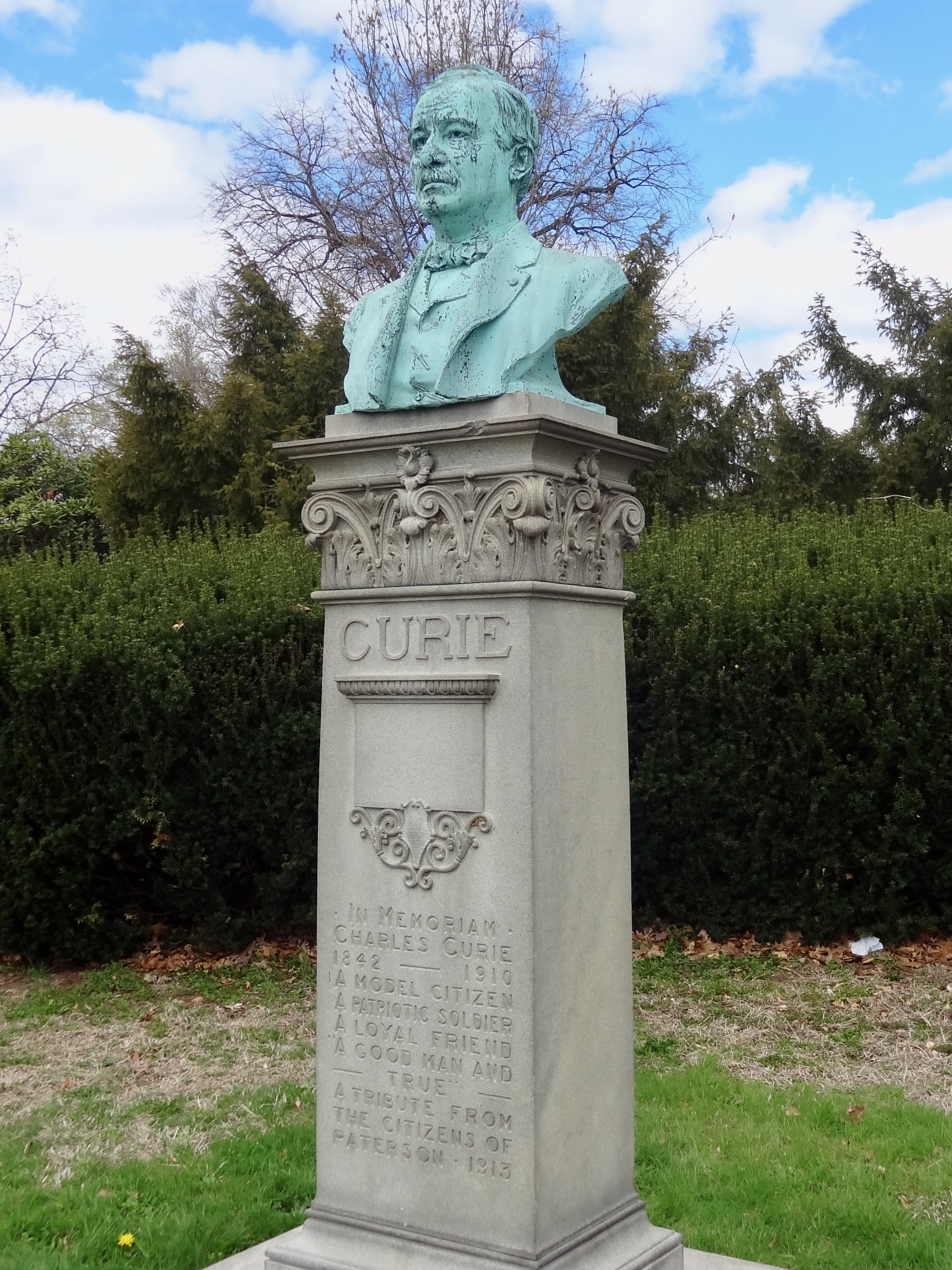
Charles Curie Monument

- Alice Weight Memorial Fountain: The fountain, erected in 1916, is of an elaborate Italian renaissance inspired piece. The large shell-motif bowl is mounted on a quadripartite pedestal made up of baroque inspired brackets with foliate decoration. A circular concrete base is interspersed with marble sections and a contemporary decorative wrought iron fence surrounds this plaza. The fountain was given by Mary H. Weight from New York City in honor of her older sister.
- Charles Curie Monument: Designed by George Thomas Brewster, the bronze bust rests on a neo-classical granite pedestal, and was erected in 1913 in honor of a local war hero who served as a captain in the Civil War.
- Civil War Monument: The Civil War monument was installed in Eastside Park in 1922 by Gaetano Federici. This monument consists of an Egyptian-revival obelisk on a classical revival base which is surmounted by a statue of a Union soldier. The four-sided object has bronze plaques on each face. The overall monument is surrounded by four bronze Confederate cannons on granite blocks.
- Pulaski Monument: The Kazimierz Pulaski monument was commissioned by the "Americans of Polish Descent" group to honor the Polish Count and Patriot general of the American Revolution. His statue was made by Gaetano Federici for the 150th anniversary of Pulaski's death. The granite pedestal was replaced in 2000 with inscriptions added to memorialize soldiers from World War II.

== Buildings ==
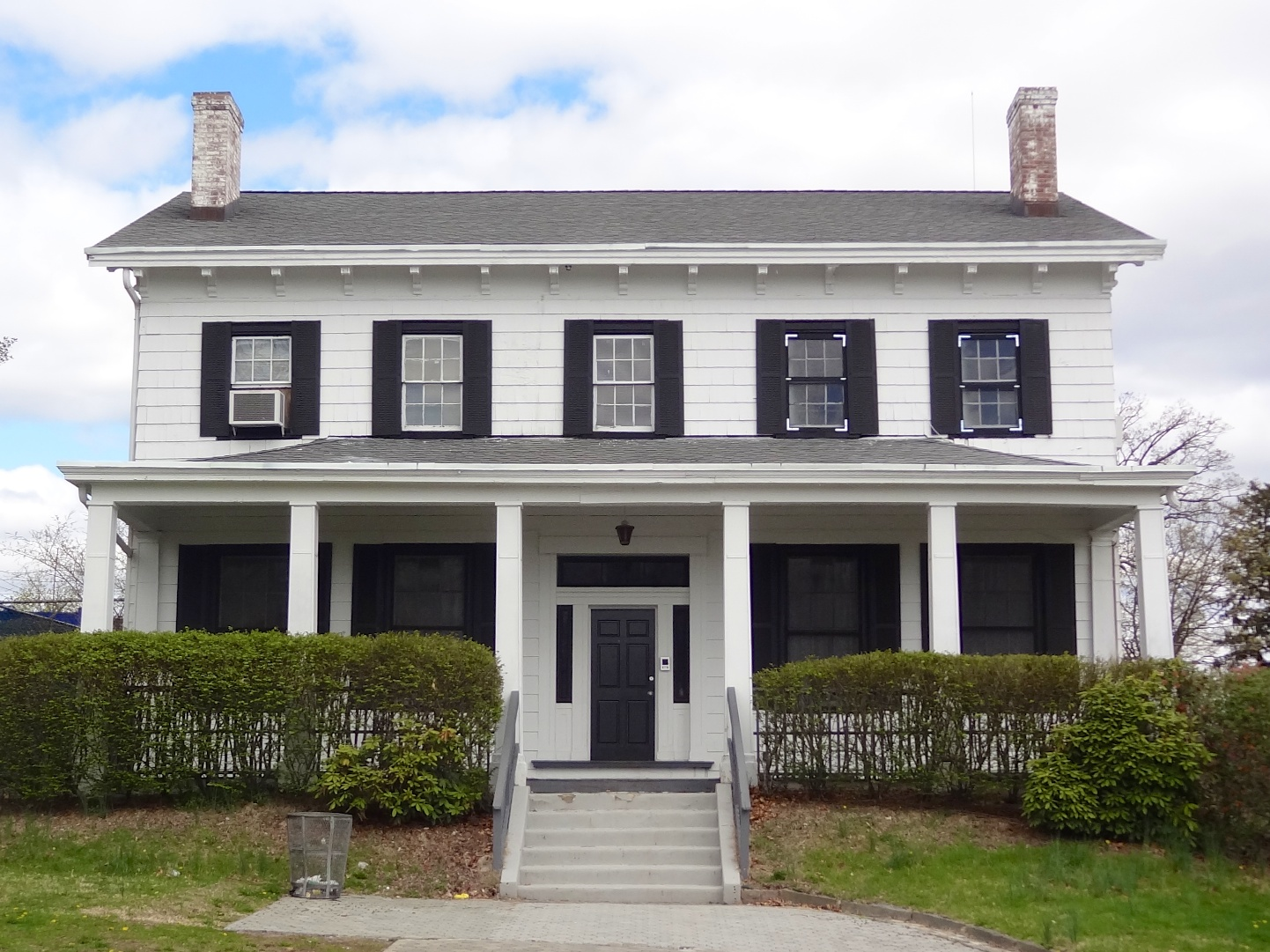
Charles E. Van Buren house

- The Charles E. Van Buren house is an 1860s farm-house that predates the park itself and the purchase by Colonel Derrom, and was built in the Greek revival style of architecture. The Van Buren home is a two-story 5 bay rectangular wood frame plan, and was occupied by the Van Buren family until 1888 when the property was purchased by the city. The home was used as the city's Park Superintendent's residence, and was later used as office space for the Department of Parks and Recreation.
- The Victorian Band Stand was inspired by the Arts and Crafts movement, and was constructed during the Victorian era at the turn of the 20th century. It is similar in design to the Women's Comfort Station, and could accommodate as many as 5,000 people for one of twenty concerts given in a season.
- Women's Comfort Station: By 1892 there was a suitable need for a commode and toilet for ladies and children and a place for shelter for the visitors in case of sudden storms. The city Parks Commission decided to convert the stone carriage house into a toilet and shelter at the expense of about $2500. The building was surrounded with a spacious piazza about twenty feet wide. By 1906, the Parks Commission decided to build a new structure. The Women's Comfort Station is 40 feet by 60 feet and two stories tall with a mansard roof, and provided a stable with five stalls, a haymow, a wagon, tool house, and workshop.
- The Cricket Club House, while a historic structure, has for years been vacant. Cricket was a highly popular sport in Paterson, and was played continuously in the park until the 1930s. The original field was situated on the grounds of the park's south lawn, and soon was expanded for baseball usage. A wood-frame cricket club house was erected on the site but burned down in 1899. In 1900, the new clubhouse was erected, which is the stone and concrete building standing presently.
