= Flatbush Town Hall =

- U.S. National Register of Historic Places
- New York State Register of Historic Places
- New York City Landmark
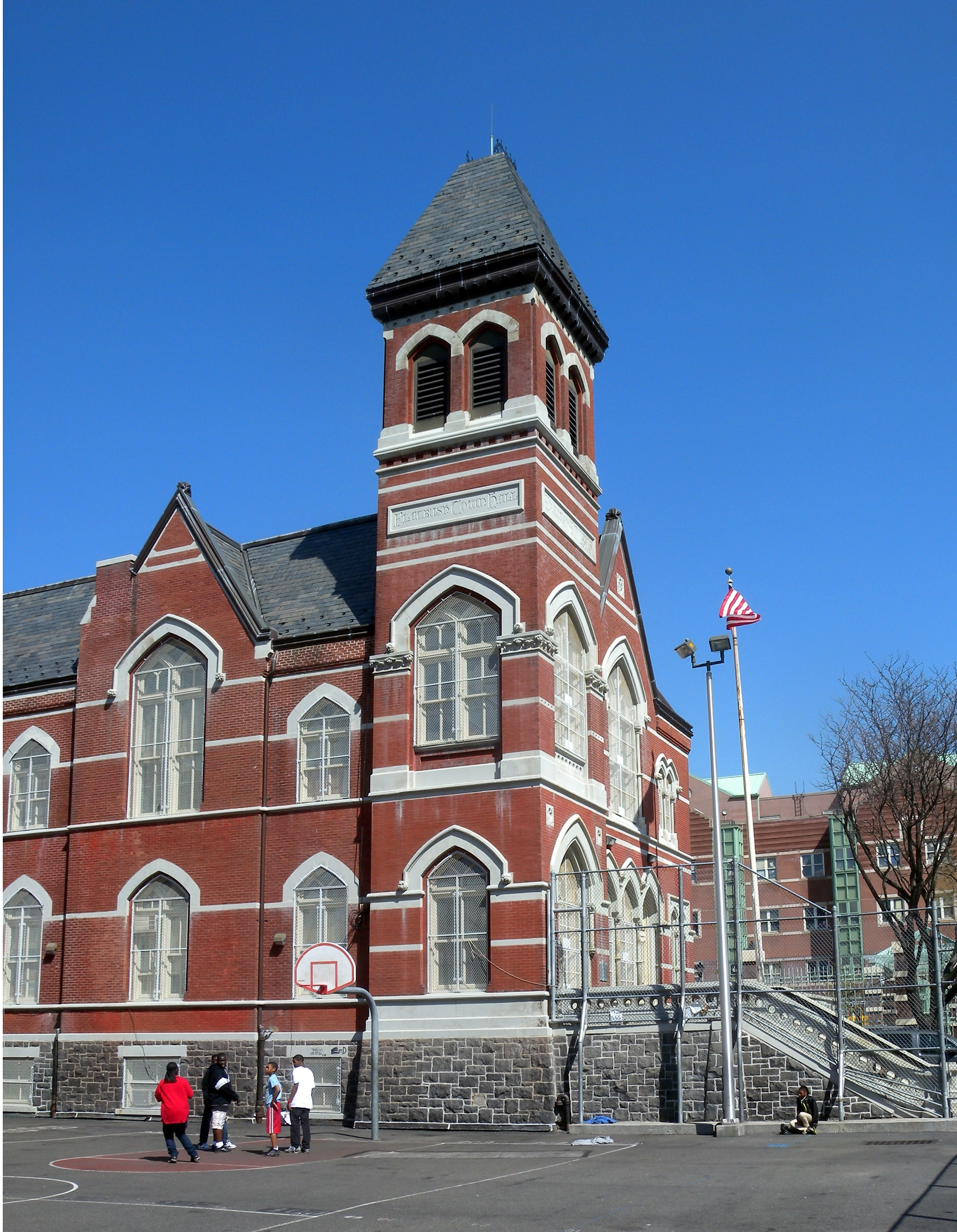
- (April 2010)

- Location within New York City Location within New York Location within the United States
- Location: 35 Snyder Ave. Brooklyn, New York City
- Coordinates: 40°38′56″N 73°57′26″W
- Built: 1874-75
- Architect: John Y. Culyer, William Vause
- Architectural style: High Victorian Gothic
- NRHP reference No.: 72000851
- NYSRHP No.: 04701.000025
- NYCL No.: 2285

Significant dates
- Added to NRHP: July 24, 1972
- Designated NYSRHP: June 23, 1980
- Designated NYCL: October 16, 1973

Flatbush Town Hall at 35 Snyder Avenue between Flatbush and Bedford Avenues in the Flatbush neighborhood of Brooklyn, New York City, is a historic town hall built in 1874–75 and designed by John Y. Culyer in the High Victorian Gothic style in the Ruskinian mode. It is a two-story masonry building on a stone foundation, and features a three-story bell tower with a steep hip roof. The building dates from the time before the Town of Flatbush was integrated into the City of Brooklyn, in 1894, after which the building served as a magistrate's court and the New York City Police Department's 67th Police Precinct station.

Due to the efforts of the Town of Flatbush Civic and Cultural Association and the Flatbush Historical Society, the building was saved from a planned demolition, and was designated a New York City Landmark in 1966, and was listed on the National Register of Historic Places in 1972. In the late 1980s it underwent a redesign and refurbishment by the New York City Department of Administrative Services, and it is now used as a public school focused on the needs of special education children.

== See also ==
- List of New York City Landmarks
- National Register of Historic Places listings in Kings County, New York
