= Little Lima =

Populated place in Passaic County, New Jersey, US

Coordinates: 40.913626°N 74.176233°W

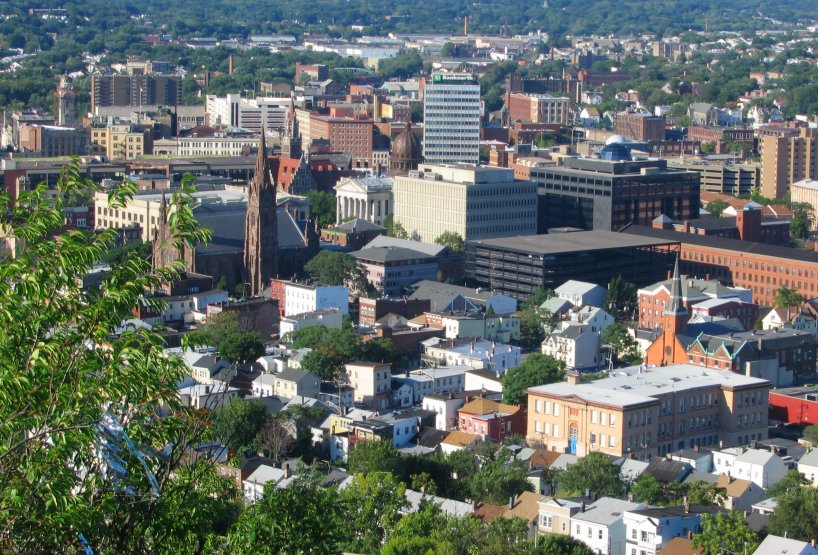
Paterson, New Jersey, within the New York City Metropolitan Area, considered by many to be the capital of the Peruvian Diaspora in the United States, is home to Little Peru on Market Street, the largest Peruvian American enclave and the largest Peruvian enclave outside South America, comprising approximately 10,000 Peruvian immigrants.

Little Lima is a Peruvian enclave in Paterson, New Jersey, United States, and the largest Peruvian enclave outside of South America, home to approximately 10,000 Peruvian immigrants, by U.S. Census Bureau estimates. New Jersey's Peruvian population continues to grow in its urban areas, especially in Paterson, which is considered by many to be the capital of the Peruvian diaspora in the United States. Meanwhile, East Newark, a smaller borough, in Hudson County, New Jersey, has the largest Peruvian percentage in the U.S. per capita, and New Jersey is home to the largest per capita Peruvian American population of any U.S. state.

Little Lima is bounded to the west by Spruce Street, to the north by McBride Avenue, to the east by Cianci Street, and to the south by Ward and Oliver Streets. The commercial heart of Little Lima is Market Street. Little Lima is close to Paterson's Little Italy and to the Mexican, Dominican, and Puerto Rican neighborhoods on Main Street, as well as the nearby Great Falls on the Passaic River. Peruvian bodegas, bakeries, groceries, and restaurants line this busy section of Market Street. Little Lima is home to the Great Peruvian Festival and the Peruvian Parade, held in the summer. Little Lima is in the heart of Paterson's first neighborhood, Dublin. The Dublin District, as it was originally known, went from a mostly Irish American neighborhood to an Italian American neighborhood in Little Italy's heyday; however, the Dublin District and specifically Little Lima have since evolved into a predominantly Hispanic neighborhood, with many Peruvian, Ecuadorian, and Bolivian citizens.

== See also ==
- Hispanics and Latinos in New Jersey
- Havana on the Hudson
- La Ventiuno, Paterson
- The Ironbound
