= Westside Park (Paterson, New Jersey) =

Historic house in New Jersey, United States

- Van Houten House
- U.S. National Register of Historic Places
- New Jersey Register of Historic Places
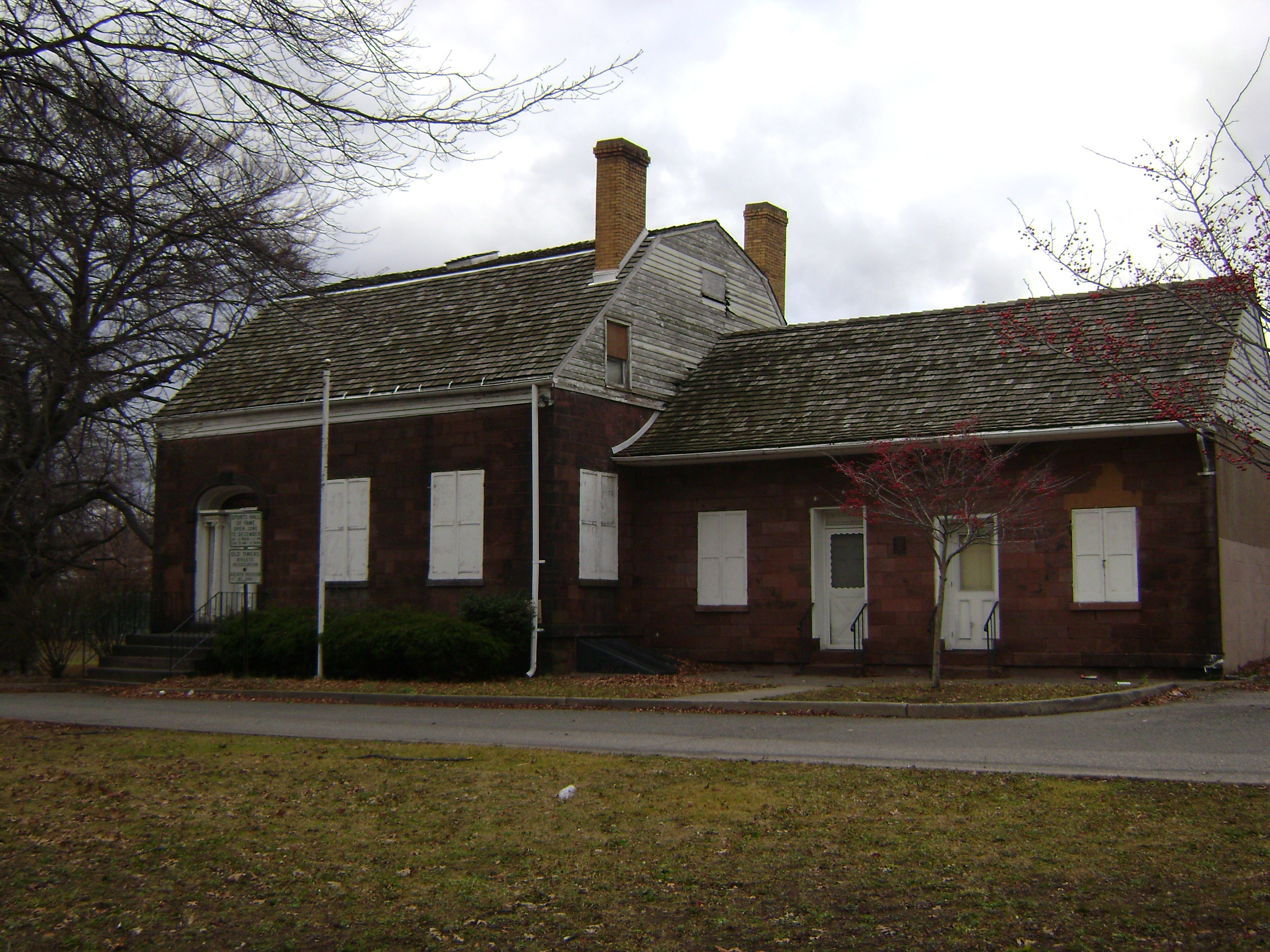
- Van Houten House seen on December 23, 2011

- Location within Passaic County, New Jersey Location within New Jersey Location within the United States
- Location: 114–242 Totowa Avenue, Paterson, New Jersey
- Coordinates: 40°54′48″N 74°11′25.8″W
- Built: 1831
- Architectural style: Greek Revival, Dutch Design
- NRHP reference No.: 73001132
- NJRHP No.: 2401

Significant dates
- Added to NRHP: March 7, 1973
- Designated NJRHP: August 7, 1972

Westside Park is a 26.6-acre (10.8 ha) municipal park located between the Passaic River and Totowa Avenue in the city of Paterson in Passaic County, New Jersey, United States. It is home to the historic Van Houten House, which was built in 1831 and was documented by the Historic American Buildings Survey (HABS) in 1936. The two-story brick house was added to the National Register of Historic Places on March 7, 1973, for its significance in architecture (Dutch Colonial) and urban planning.

== History and description ==
After his marriage in 1741, Gerrebrant Van Houten built a brick farmhouse with a frame addition on this site. His son, Dirck lived here during the American Revolutionary War. General George Washington visited here while he was staying at the Dey Mansion in 1780. The original house burned in 1830, and Dirck's son Adrian rebuilt and enlarged it in 1831. After Adrian's death in 1855, the Society for Establishing Useful Manufactures (S.U.M.) bought the house. The Van Houten House was purchased by the city of Paterson in 1889.

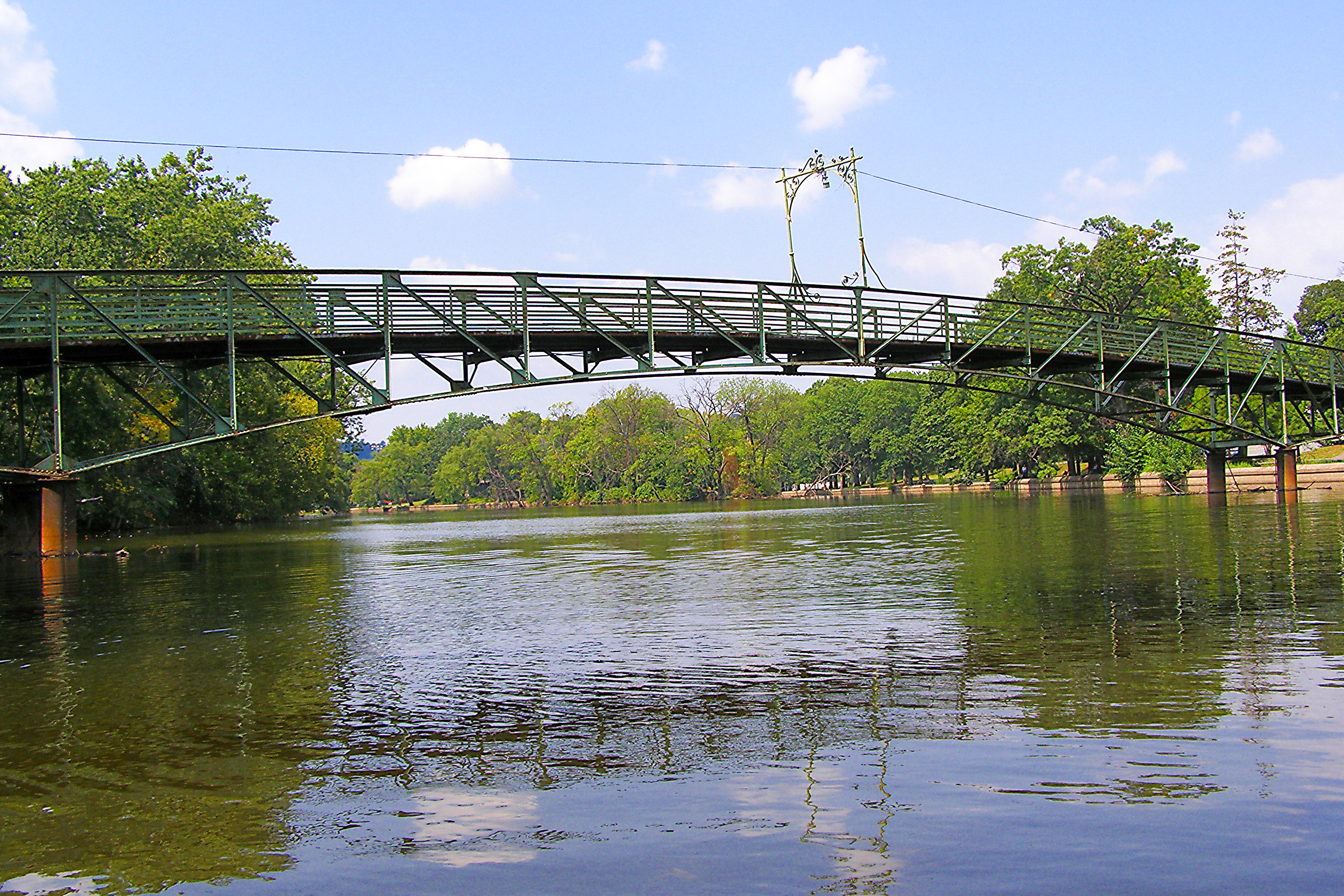
Footbridge over the Passaic River

== See also ==
- National Register of Historic Places listings in Passaic County, New Jersey
