= Eastside Park (neighborhood), Paterson =

Historic district of Paterson, New Jersey, United States

- Eastside Park Historic District
- U.S. National Register of Historic Places
- U.S. Historic district
- New Jersey Register of Historic Places
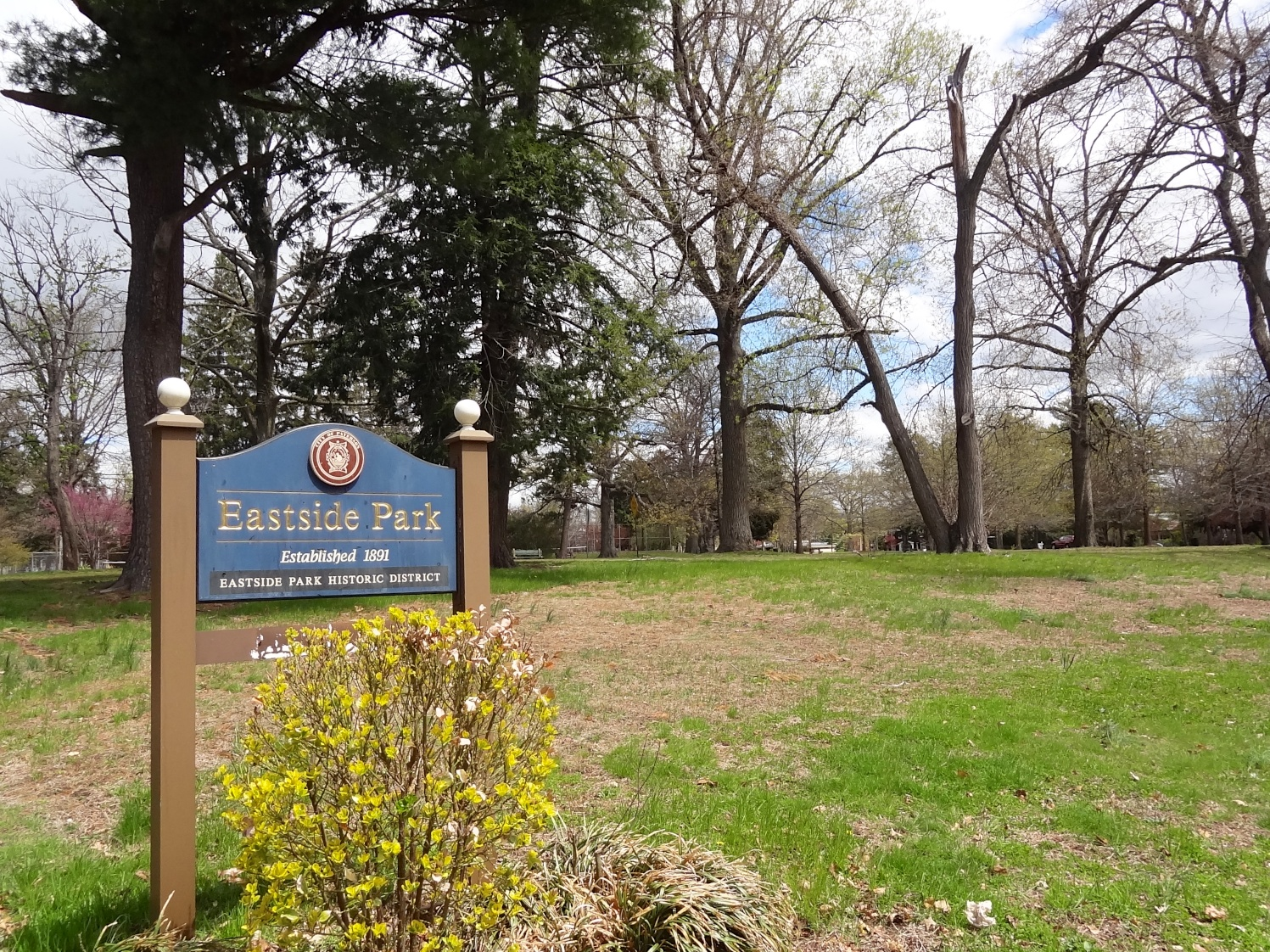
- Entrance to Eastside Park

- Location within Passaic County, New Jersey Location within New Jersey Location within the United States
- Location: Roughly bounded by 20th, Vreeland, and 11th Avenues, E. 33rd Street and Mclean Boulevard, Paterson, New Jersey
- Coordinates: 40°54′50″N 74°8′24″W
- Area: 300 acres (120 ha)
- Built: 1888
- Architect: Fred Wesley Wentworth; Welch, Smith and Provot; John Y. Culyer
- Architectural style: Colonial Revival, Tudor Revival
- NRHP reference No.: 04000673
- NJRHP No.: 2372

Significant dates
- Added to NRHP: July 7, 2004
- Designated NJRHP: May 10, 2004

Eastside Park is a residential neighborhood in the Eastside of Paterson, New Jersey. The Eastside Park section of the city is generally defined as the area of the city bordered by Vreeland Avenue and East 33rd Street (both part of the "old" York Road) to the west, 20th Avenue to the south, McLean Boulevard (Route 20) to the east, and Martin Luther King, Jr. Way (Broadway) to the north. The Eastside Park section is delineated from the Manor section of the city by Broadway, which becomes Route 4 before crossing the Passaic River into Elmwood Park (formerly East Paterson) in Bergen County.

== History ==
Once the home of the city's industrial and political leaders, the neighborhood experienced a significant downturn as industry fled Paterson. In recent years, people have begun moving back into the neighborhood and are restoring some of the area's historic houses. The jewel of the neighborhood remains Eastside Park and the mansions that surround it. In addition, this section of Paterson once had a large Jewish population, with the original sites of Barnert Temple and Temple Emanuel both situated in the section. The Eastside Park neighborhood now houses the Paterson campus of the Islamic Center of Passaic County, one of the largest Muslim communities in the United States, which serves a congregant base of over 25,000 people.

== Historic district ==
The Eastside Park Historic District is a historic district situated across both the Eastside Park and Manor sections of the city. It was added to the National Register of Historic Places on July 7, 2004, for its significance in architecture, landscape architecture and community planning. The district includes 790 contributing buildings.

== Gallery ==
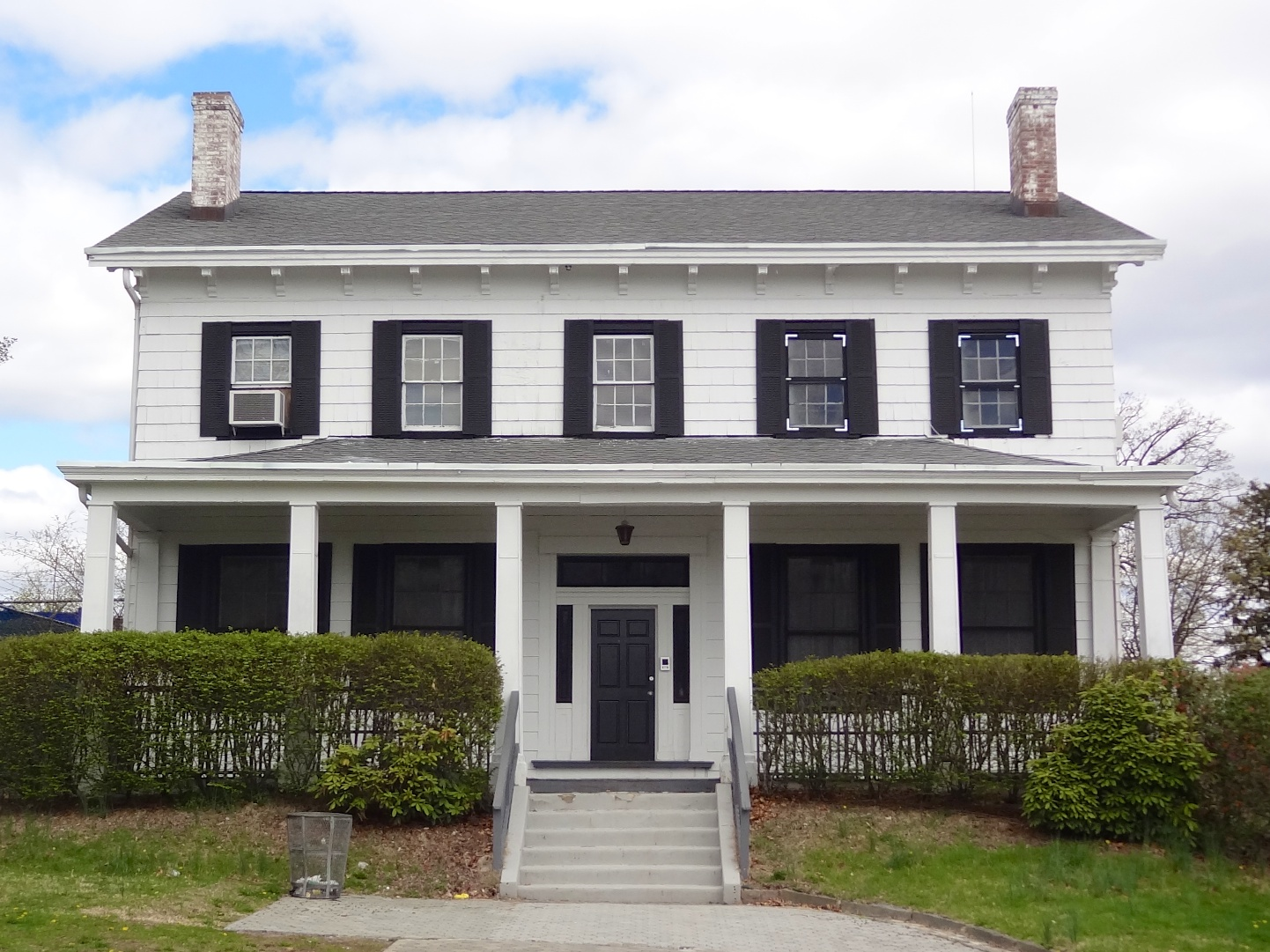
Charles Van Buren farmhouse, the White House

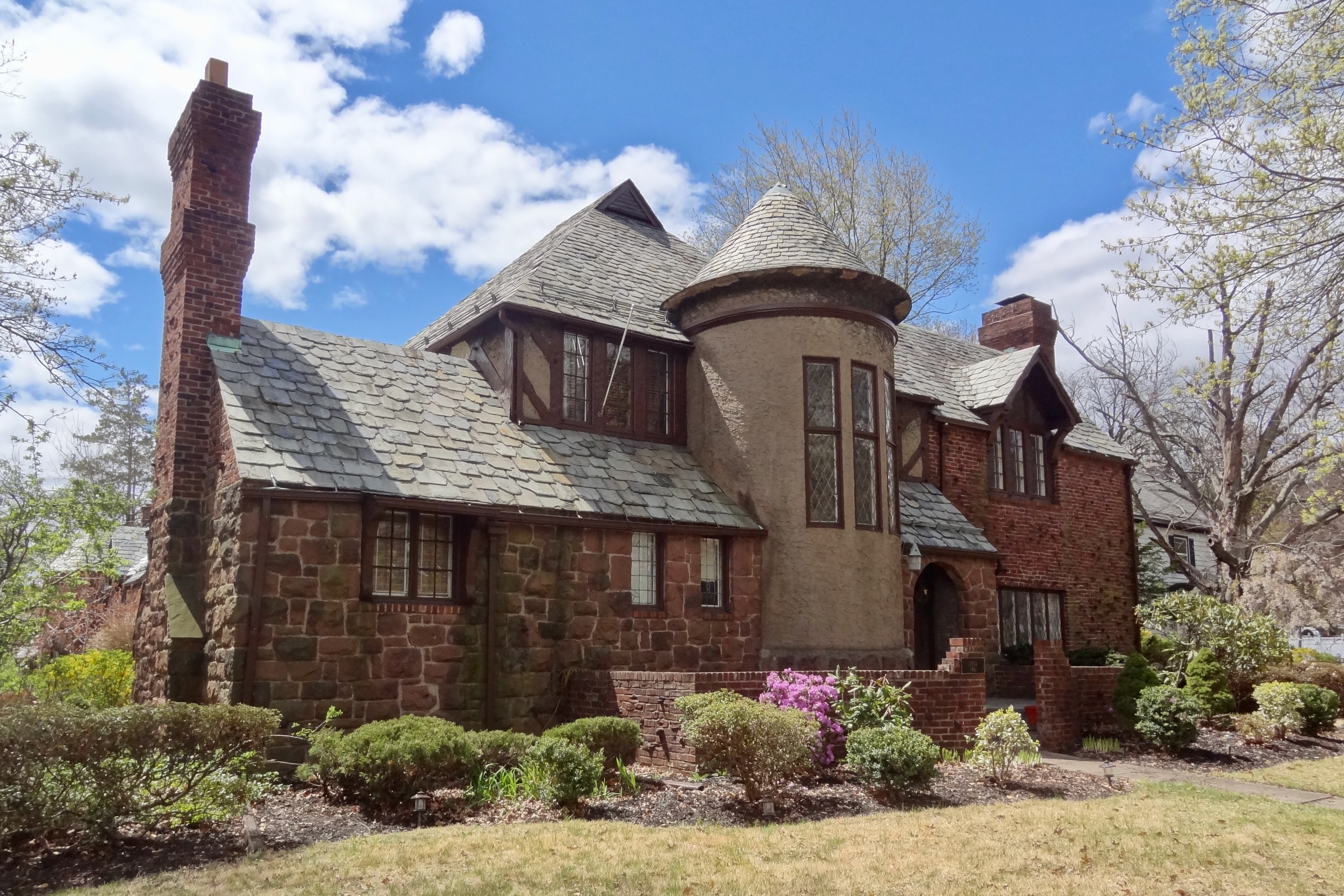
Tudor Revival style house

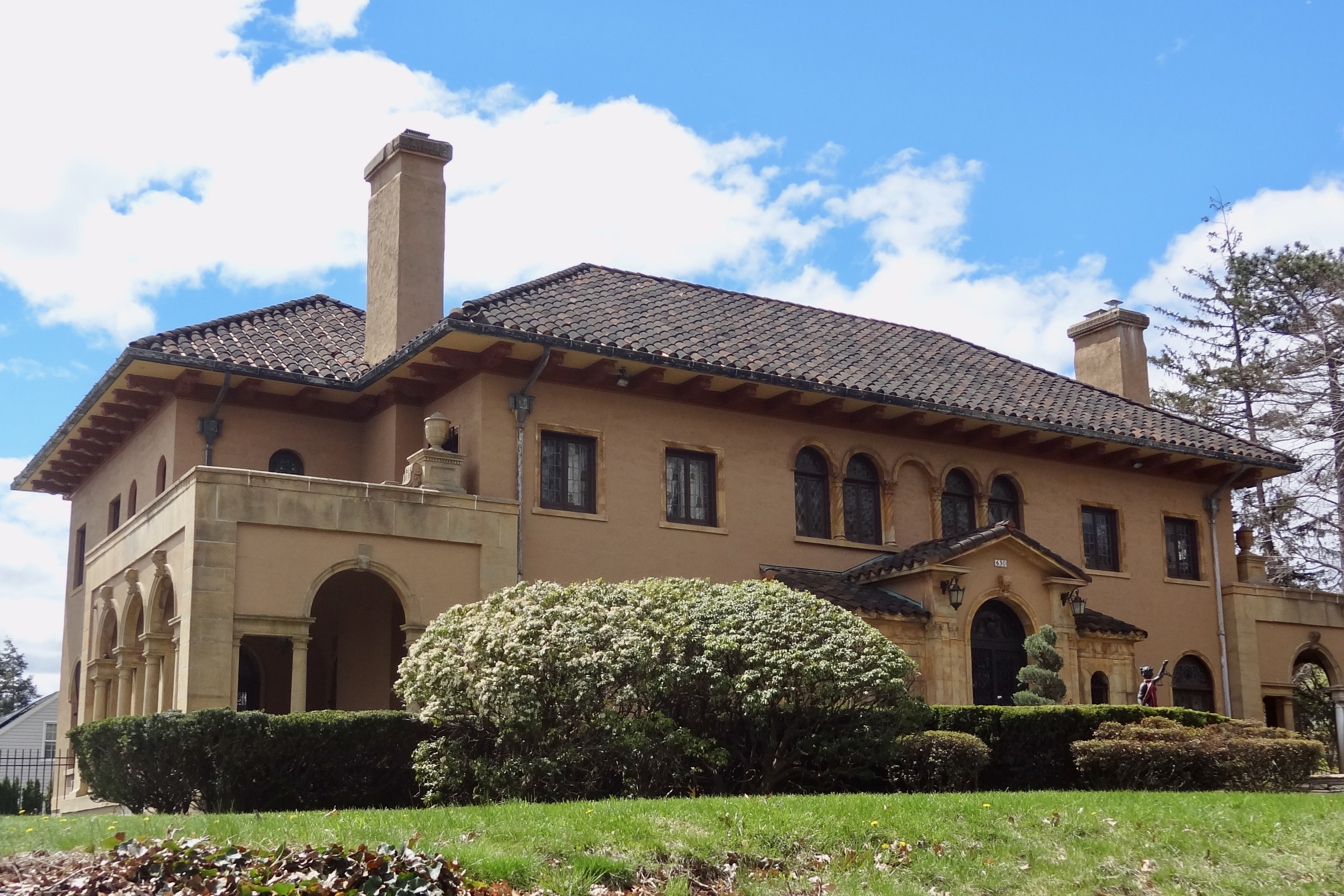
Italian Renaissance style house

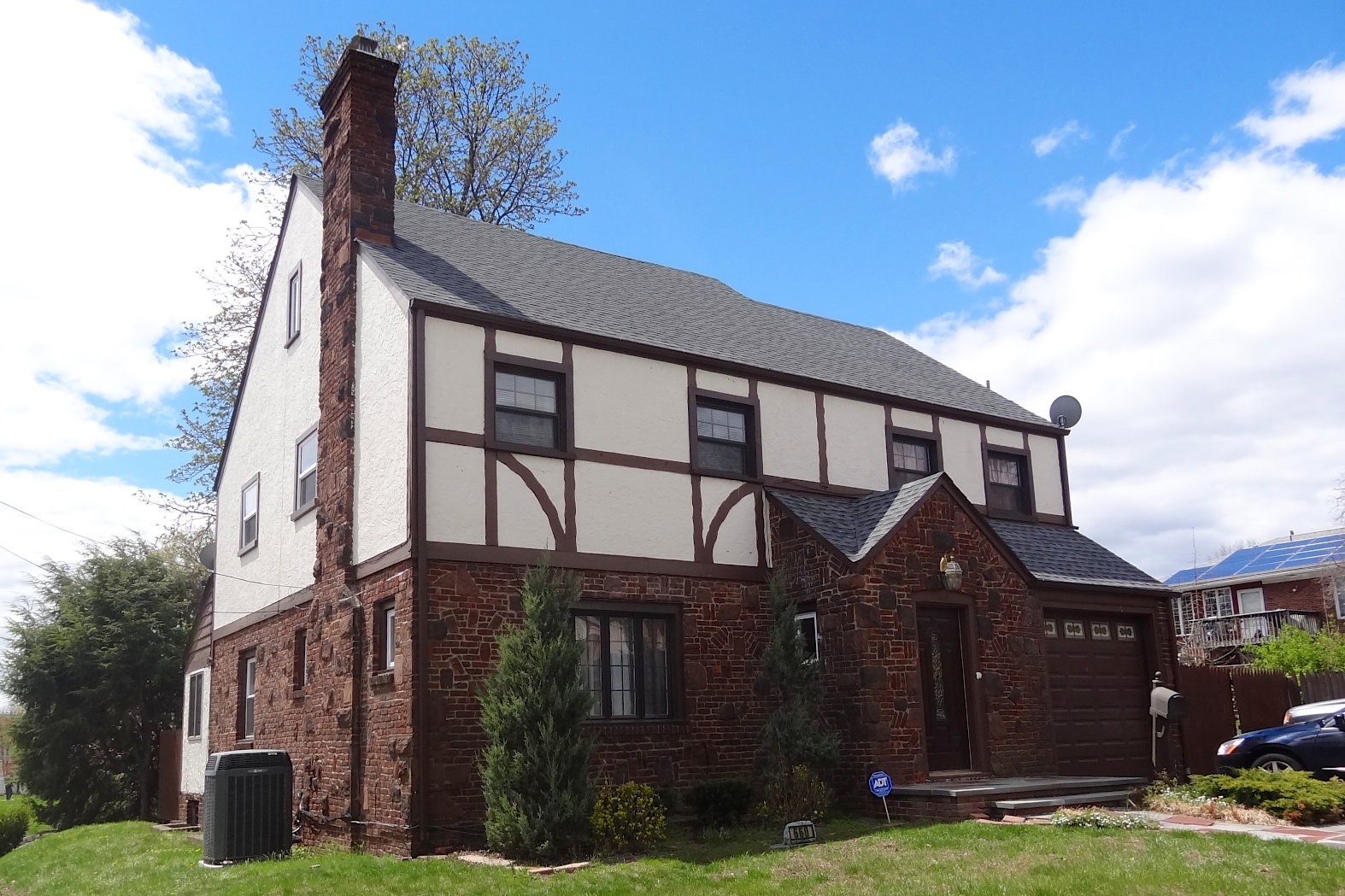
Tudor Revival style house
