= Dublin, Paterson =

Populated place in Passaic County, New Jersey, US

Coordinates: 40.912572°N 74.173078°W

Dublin is a former Irish-American neighborhood in Paterson, New Jersey that makes up Little Lima and Little Italy today. Dublin was Paterson's first distinct neighborhood that grew up around the mills along the east bank of the Passaic River in Downtown Paterson. Alexander Hamilton established the Society for the Establishment of Useful Manufactures (S.U.M.), which helped to harness the power of Great Falls in 1791.

In the early 19th century there were several mills and machine shops along the Passaic, downriver from the falls. A grid of streets were laid out by Pierre L'Enfant for the housing of millworkers in the area. The area then known as Dublin was bound by the Morris Canal, Garret Mountain, and Main Street with a populated area along Market Street.

In the early 20th century a growing Italian workforce in the area created the Little Italy neighborhood around Cianci Street. Some of the old mill buildings of the area have been converted into housing and retail in addition to the Paterson Museum.
