= Little Italy, Paterson =

Populated place in Passaic County, New Jersey, US

Coordinates: 40.915799°N 74.174924°W

Little Italy is a neighborhood in Downtown Paterson, New Jersey. The neighborhood is bound roughly by College Boulevard and Memorial Drive to the north, Cianci Street to the west, Ward Street to the south and Main Street to the east. Cianci Street is named for pastor of the St. Michael's Catholic church, Monsignor Carlo M. Cianci, who retired at the age of 85, in 1967. The neighborhood is closely situated near the growing Little Lima neighborhood to the south. It has a less defined presence and boundaries than it used to, but Cianci Street continues to have numerous Italian delis and restaurants. A Christopher Columbus statue is located in a small park near Cianci Street and McBride Avenue. Little Lima and Little Italy are both part of Paterson's first neighborhood, Dublin.
