= People's Park, Paterson =

Populated place in Passaic County, New Jersey, US

Coordinates: 40.904042°N 74.152479°W

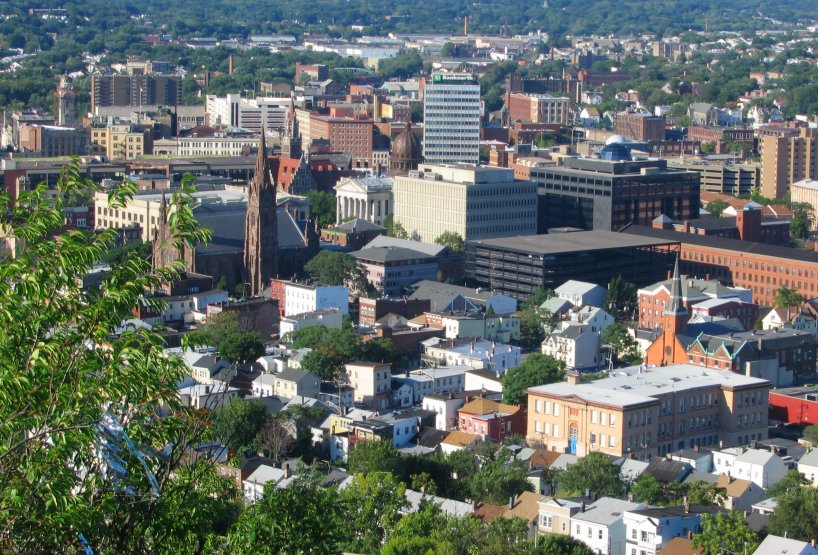
Downtown Paterson

People's Park is a section at the Eastside neighborhood in the city of Paterson in the U.S. state of New Jersey. It is a mixed-use area with a diverse population. It is roughly bounded by Interstate 80 to the south, Madison Avenue to the west and Market Street to the north. It is a mostly residential neighborhood located north of 23rd Avenue and South of Market Street.

In the late 1940s, Paterson State Teachers College was located in the upper two floors of Public School #24 located at the intersection of East 22nd Street and 19th Ave. Hugh Robinson attended PS24 during this period.

The section of Twenty-First Avenue in this area was once a predominantly Italian-American neighborhood, but today it has a large Hispanic population and is referred to as La Ventiuno by Paterson's Spanish-speaking community. It is an active and vibrant retail strip featuring a variety of shops and services catering to a diverse clientele. Although there is still a significant Italian presence left in the neighborhood, it also has a large first-generation Latin American population, particularly Colombian.

== See also ==
- Havana on the Hudson
- Hispanics and Latinos in New Jersey
- Little Lima
- The Ironbound
