= Eliu Rivera =

Puerto Rican stateside politician

Deputy Mayor of Jersey City

Personal details
- Born: December 8, 1943 Aibonito, Puerto Rico
- Died: October 1, 2017 (aged 73) Aibonito, Puerto Rico

Eliu Rivera (December 8, 1943 – October 1, 2017) was a Democratic Party politician who represented District 4 on the Hudson County, New Jersey Board of Chosen Freeholders, one of nine members who serve in a legislative role administering all county business. District 4 includes portions of the City of Jersey City, New Jersey. He served in office from 2006 to July 1, 2013, when he resigned from office and was replaced by E. Junior Maldonado.

Rivera was born in Aibonito, Puerto Rico and migrated with his family to the mainland United States at an early age. He attended local schools, graduated from William L. Dickinson High School in Jersey City. Then worked in the United States Postal Service and continued his education at Rutgers University and Saint Peter's University. He later received an honorary doctorate for his community work from New Jersey City University.

A community activist, Rivera was employed by the Puertorriqueños Asociados for Community Organization (P.A.C.O.) agency since 1970 and serving as its Executive Director, Rivera worked extensively in the housing, economic development, health, education and community development areas.

Rivera is a former Deputy Mayor of Jersey City. In 2012, the corner of Manila Avenue and Second Street was renamed in his honor.

Rivera died on October 1, 2017, at Menonita Hospital in his hometown Aibonito, Puerto Rico, at age 73, from the lingering effects of a chemical he had accidentally inhaled six years earlier that required him to breathe from an oxygen tank.
