= South Paterson =

Neighborhood in New Jersey, U.S.

Coordinates: 40.889°N 74.165°W

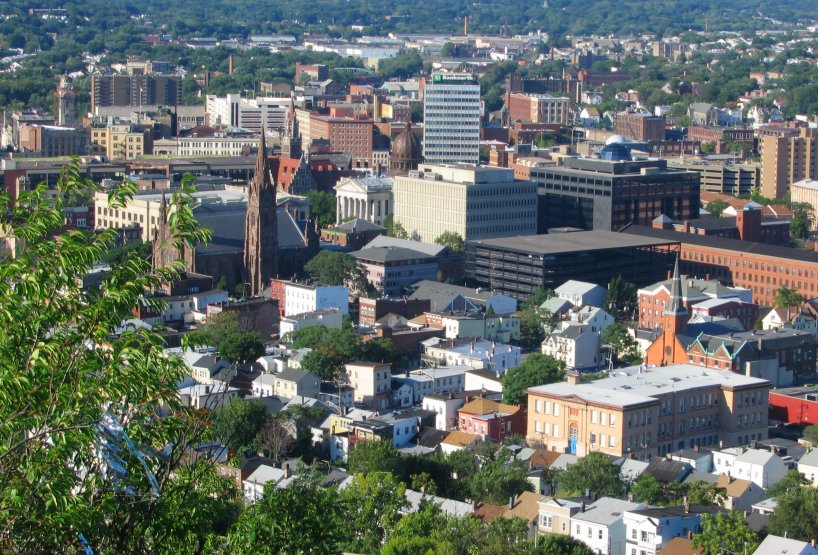
An aerial view of Paterson, New Jersey

South Paterson is a neighborhood of Paterson, New Jersey, United States. The neighborhood holds a large Arab-American population with a growing number of immigrants from the Middle East. The diverse neighborhood, with significant Turkish, Arab, and Palestinian populations, has become known as Little Istanbul, or Little Palestine. The city is a sister city to Ramallah, Palestine, and has renamed a segment of its main street 'Palestine Way'.

== History ==
The Arab community has existed since the late 19th century, when many Lebanese and Syrian immigrants moved in. Since then, immigration from Lebanon has slowed, although many second, third, and fourth-generation residents remain. In addition to the Arab community, a Turkish community and an Azeri community have existed since the 1950s, made up primarily of Turks and Karachay immigrants. Palestinian immigrants have increasingly settled in the neighborhood, reinforcing its identity as Little Palestine.

Today, the area is recognized as a cultural hub for Palestinian Americans, with annual events, flag raisings, and cultural festivals drawing visitors from across the region.

== Geography ==
The neighborhood is bounded by NJ 19 on the west, the border with Clifton, New Jersey to the south, the Passaic River to the east, and I-80 to the north. The area is also part of Lakeview, which lies to the east of East Railroad Avenue.

== Economy ==
There are many Middle Eastern restaurants, grocery stores, and retail outlets in the area. Main Street holds the largest concentration of these businesses, but Turkish and Arab stores and restaurants can be found throughout. The area is mostly residential with commercial zoning along Main Street.

== Education ==
The Paterson-based Arab American Civic Association runs an Arabic language program in the Paterson School District.
