= Slippery Rock Brook =

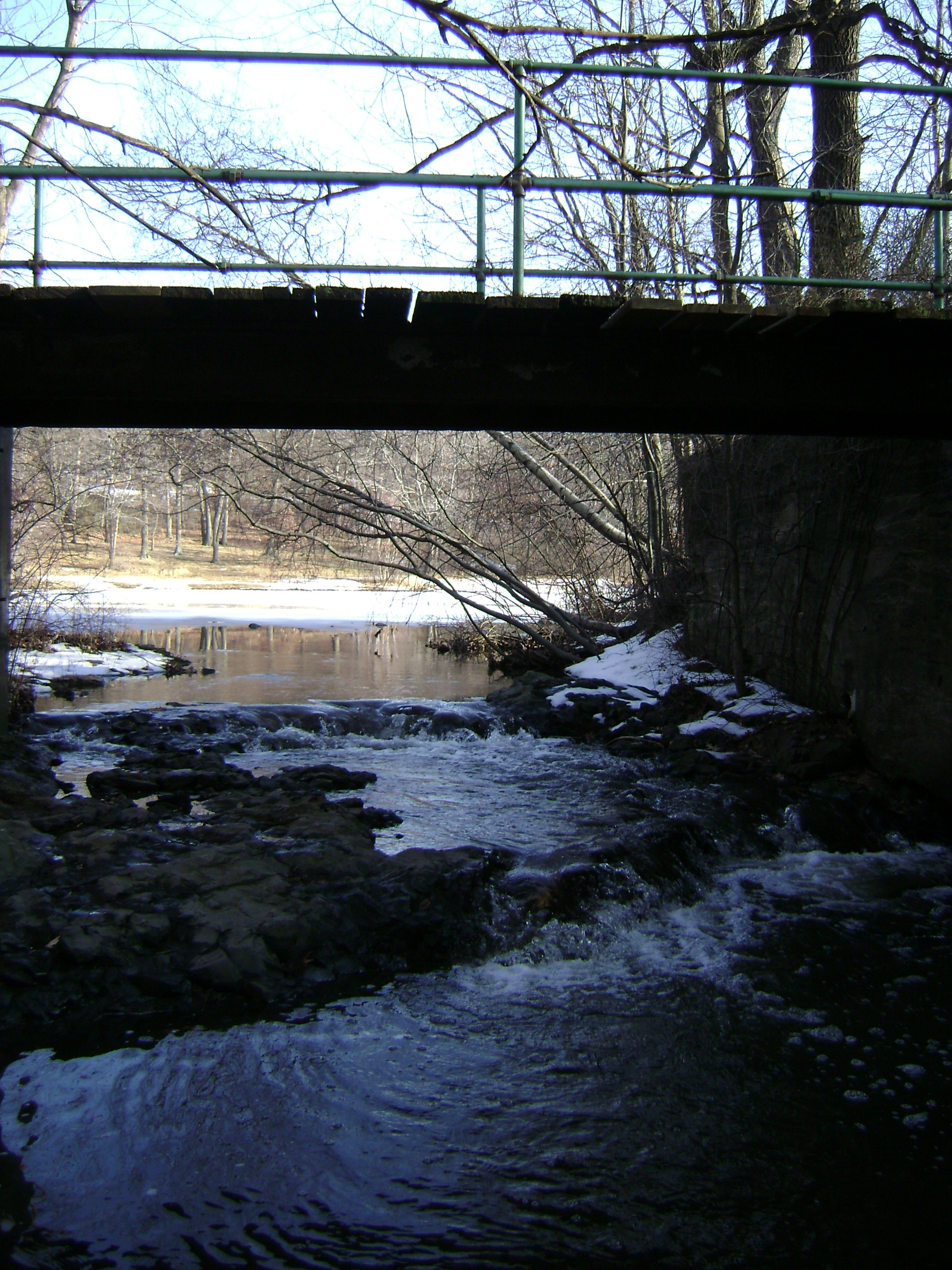
- Slippery Rock Brook viewed from under Mountain Ave in Woodland Park

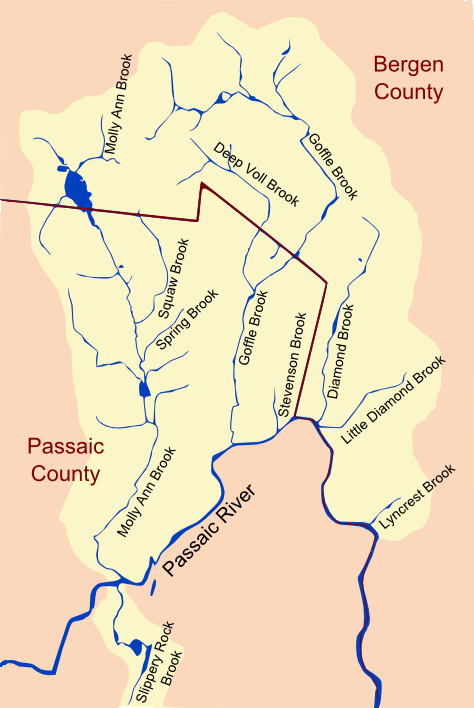
- Major Tributaries of the North Bend of the Passaic River

Location
- Country: United States
- State: New Jersey
- County: Passaic

Physical characteristics
- Source
  - location: Woodland Park, Passaic County, New Jersey, United States
  - coordinates: 40°53′23.34″N 74°11′14.39″W
  - elevation: 379 ft (116 m)
- Mouth: Passaic River
  - location: Paterson, Passaic County, New Jersey, United States
  - coordinates: 40°54′42.8″N 74°11′22.62″W
  - elevation: 118 ft (36 m)
- Length: 2 mi (3.2 km)

Slippery Rock Brook is a tributary of the Passaic River in Passaic County, New Jersey in the United States.

Slippery Rock Brook flows north as it drains part of the western flank of First Watchung Mountain. Traveling south from its confluence with the Passaic River, it passes through the city of Paterson and the borough of Woodland Park.

== Course ==
Slippery Rock Brook arises south of Weasel Drift Road in Rifle Camp Park, in Woodland Park and travels north into Garret Mountain Reservation, forming the elongated Barbour Pond, a 0.3-mile (0.48 km) by 0.05-mile (0.080 km) natural lake. Turning west, the brook travels a short distance before forming the New Street Reservoir and Highland Lake, both man-made ponds.

At Highland Lake the brook turns north again, flowing under Interstate 80 as it enters Paterson. The brook takes on an urban appearance as it winds its last half mile to the Passaic River with its mouth in Pennington Park. The confluence with the Passaic occurs almost directly opposite the mouth of Molly Ann Brook, with Slippery Rock Brook's mouth approximately 300 feet (91 m) upstream.

== Ecology ==
The majority of Slippery Rock Brook’s riparian corridor has been overrun by urbanization, but a significant section remains intact through Garret Mountain Reservation. South of Barbour Pond, the brook passes through a ravine shaded by a stand of yellow birch and witch-hazel. Rhododendrons and trout lily are known to line the banks along this section of the brook, adding vibrant colors to the riparian environment during the flowering season in May.

== See also ==
- List of rivers of New Jersey
