= Woodland Park, New Jersey =

Borough in Passaic County, New Jersey, US

- Borough
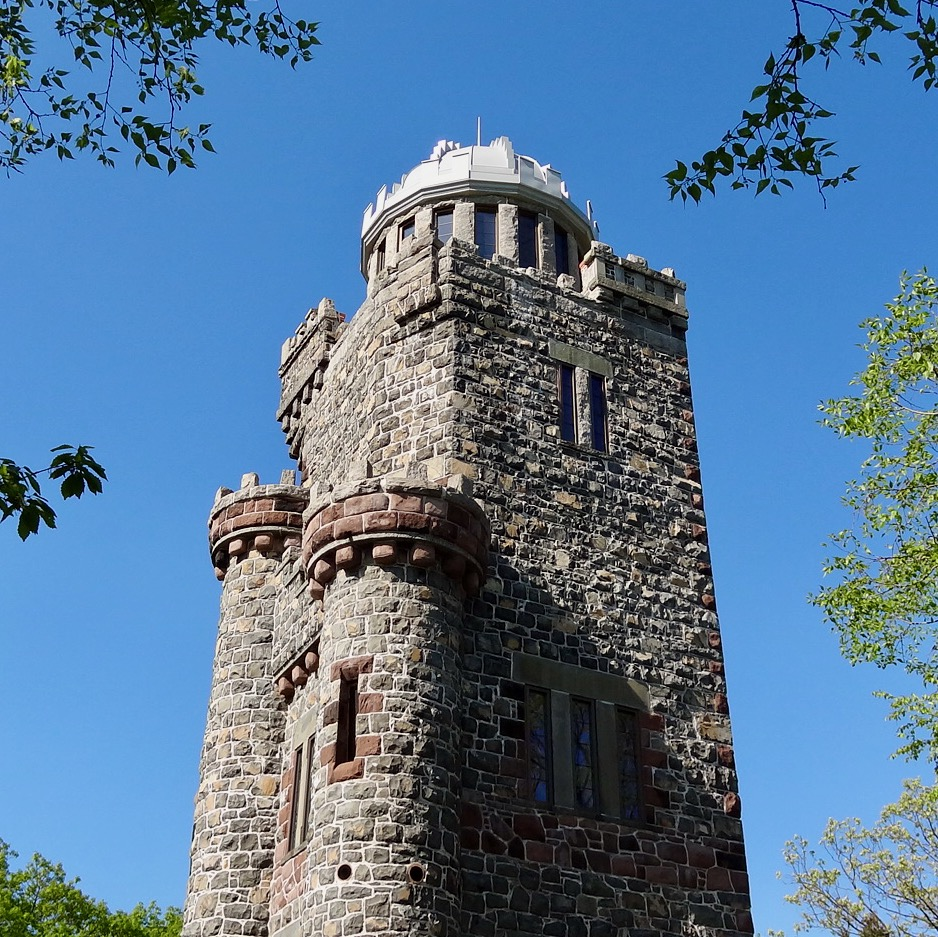
- Lambert Tower in Garret Mountain Reservation

- Seal

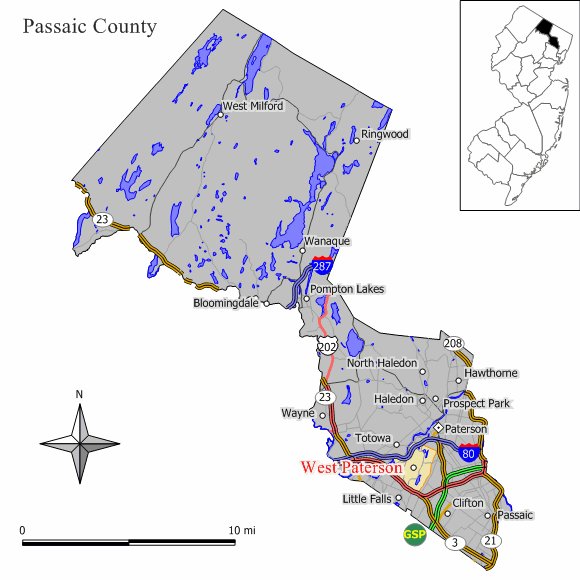
- Map of Woodland Park in Passaic County (shown under its former name West Paterson). Inset: Location of Passaic County highlighted in the State of New Jersey.

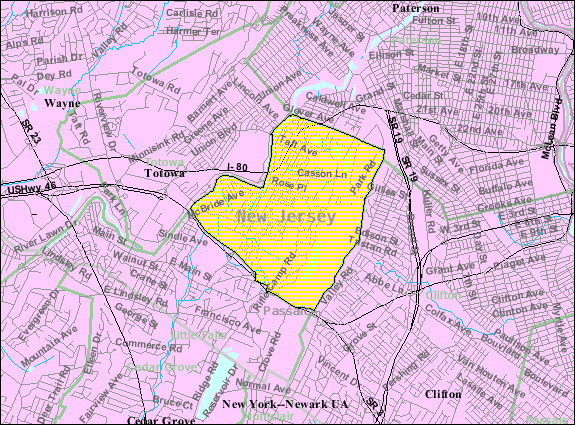
- Detailed Census Bureau map of West Paterson in 2000

- Location in Passaic County Location in New Jersey Location in the United States
- Coordinates: 40.889908°N 74.194581°W
- Country: United States
- State: New Jersey
- County: Passaic
- Incorporated: May 1, 1914 (as West Paterson)
- Renamed: January 1, 2009 (to Woodland Park)

Government
  - Type: Faulkner Act (small municipality)
  - Body: Borough Council
  - Mayor: Tracy Kallert (D, term ends December 31, 2026)
  - Administrator: Samuel Yodice Jr.
  - Municipal clerk: Sandra M. Olivola

Area
  - Total: 3.08 sq mi (7.97 km^{2})
  - Land: 2.94 sq mi (7.61 km^{2})
  - Water: 0.14 sq mi (0.36 km^{2}) 4.51%
  - Rank: 330th of 565 in state 13th of 16 in county
- Elevation: 348 ft (106 m)

Population (2020)
  - Total: 13,484
  - Estimate (2023): 13,138
  - Rank: 192nd of 565 in state 7th of 16 in county
  - Density: 4,588/sq mi (1,771/km^{2})
  - Rank: 127th of 565 in state 8th of 16 in county
- Time zone: UTC−05:00 (Eastern (EST))
  - Summer (DST): UTC−04:00 (Eastern (EDT))
- ZIP Code: 07424
- Area code: 973
- FIPS code: 3403182423
- GNIS feature ID: 0885439
- Website: wpnj.us

Woodland Park (formerly West Paterson) is a borough in Passaic County, in the U.S. state of New Jersey. At the 2020 United States census, the population was 13,484.

What is now Woodland Park was formed as a borough, under the name West Paterson, by an act of the New Jersey Legislature in 1914, from portions of the township of Little Falls.

In 2008, the citizens of West Paterson voted to change the official name of the borough from West Paterson to Woodland Park.

== Geography ==
According to the United States Census Bureau, the borough had a total area of 3.08 square miles (7.97 km^{2}), including 2.94 square miles (7.61 km^{2}) of land and 0.14 square miles (0.36 km^{2}) of water (4.51%).

Slippery Rock Brook is a tributary of the Passaic River that flows north as it drains part of the western flank of First Watchung Mountain. Traveling south from its confluence with the Passaic River, it passes through the city of Paterson and the borough of Woodland Park.

The borough borders the Passaic County municipalities of Clifton, Little Falls, Paterson and Totowa.

=== Borough renaming ===
Borough residents voted in November 2008 to change the community's name to Woodland Park. This close decision—the majority was only 33 votes according to early results—marked the fourth attempt to change the borough's historic name of West Paterson: voters rejected the names "Whispering Pines", "West Park," and "Garret Mountain" in 1989, 1995, and 2001 respectively.

Such a change is not unique in recent New Jersey history: Dover Township in Ocean County became Toms River Township in November 2006, and Washington Township in Mercer County became Robbinsville Township in November 2007. The borough of East Paterson, located in adjacent Bergen County, changed its name to Elmwood Park in 1972.

Both East and West Paterson changed their names in hopes of dissociating themselves from the larger city of Paterson, which is significantly poorer and faces higher levels of crime, while preserving their E.P. and W.P. initials. In West Paterson, proponents of name change argued that their proposal would improve the borough's reputation and thus property values within the borough, as outsiders would be less likely to confuse it with Paterson. Opponents of the renaming saw no need to change, with businesses and the fire department citing the cost of changing references to the borough's name and the consequences of forgetting the community's history as West Paterson. The name change has been marred with accusations of racism and discrimination due to the city of Paterson's lower quality of life and diverse minority demographics. Some Paterson residents and advocates have jokingly suggested renaming Paterson to East Woodland Park and West Elmwood Park.

Residents who voted "No" to the name change petitioned the municipal government in an attempt to change the name back to West Paterson. A referendum was held on November 3, 2009, and the proposal was defeated by 2,248 votes to 2,216.

There is an unincorporated area called Woodland Park in the city of Summit, in Union County, adjacent to New Providence.

== Economy ==
Cytec Industries is a specialty chemicals and materials technology company. Cytec was created in a 1993 spin off of American Cyanamid's industrial chemicals businesses. In July 2015, Solvay S.A. announced its intent to acquire Cytec for a purchase price of US$5.5 billion.

North Jersey Media Group, owned by Gannett, is the parent company of The Record and Herald News newspapers. The company relocated the operations of the Herald News to Woodland Park in 1999, and shifted its staff at The Record from Hackensack to Woodland Park from 2008 through 2010.

== Parks and recreation ==
Garret Mountain Reservation is a county park covering 568 acres (230 ha). The site of Lambert Castle, the park offers views of the New York City skyline, as it rises 500 feet (150 m) above sea level. The park is primarily within Woodland Park, but it also extends into the cities of Paterson and Clifton.

Rifle Camp Park is a county park covering 225 acres (91 ha) located mostly within Woodland Park, but its eastern edge extends into Clifton as well. The park includes hiking trails, an observatory, nature center, fitness trail, amphitheater, a bird watching blind, and an overnight camping facility for local scout organizations.

== Demographics ==
Historical population
Census	Pop.	Note	%±
1920	1,858		—
1930	3,101		66.9%
1940	3,306		6.6%
1950	3,931		18.9%
1960	7,602		93.4%
1970	11,692		53.8%
1980	11,293		−3.4%
1990	10,982		−2.8%
2000	10,987		0.0%
2010	11,819		7.6%
2020	13,484		14.1%
2023 (est.)	13,138	▼	−2.6%
Population sources: 1920 1920–1930; 1940–2000 2000; 2010 2020

=== 2020 census ===
As of the 2020 census, Woodland Park had a population of 13,484. The median age was 43.9 years. 18.7% of residents were under the age of 18 and 22.9% of residents were 65 years of age or older. For every 100 females there were 91.1 males, and for every 100 females age 18 and over there were 87.6 males age 18 and over.

100.0% of residents lived in urban areas, while 0.0% lived in rural areas.

There were 5,252 households in Woodland Park, of which 28.4% had children under the age of 18 living in them. Of all households, 48.3% were married-couple households, 16.2% were households with a male householder and no spouse or partner present, and 29.9% were households with a female householder and no spouse or partner present. About 27.0% of all households were made up of individuals and 14.1% had someone living alone who was 65 years of age or older.

There were 5,495 housing units, of which 4.4% were vacant. The homeowner vacancy rate was 1.0% and the rental vacancy rate was 3.5%.

Racial composition as of the 2020 census
Race	Number	Percent
White	8,723	64.7%
Black or African American	603	4.5%
American Indian and Alaska Native	92	0.7%
Asian	701	5.2%
Native Hawaiian and Other Pacific Islander	1	0.0%
Some other race	1,833	13.6%
Two or more races	1,531	11.4%
Hispanic or Latino (of any race)	3,816	28.3%

=== 2010 census ===
The 2010 United States census counted 11,819 people, 4,632 households, and 3,215 families in the borough. The population density was 3,987.9 per square mile (1,539.7/km^{2}). There were 4,835 housing units at an average density of 1,631.4 per square mile (629.9/km^{2}). The racial makeup was 82.33% (9,730) White, 4.23% (500) Black or African American, 0.16% (19) Native American, 4.20% (496) Asian, 0.10% (12) Pacific Islander, 6.15% (727) from other races, and 2.83% (335) from two or more races. Hispanic or Latino of any race were 20.66% (2,442) of the population.

Of the 4,632 households, 26.9% had children under the age of 18; 52.7% were married couples living together; 12.4% had a female householder with no husband present and 30.6% were non-families. Of all households, 25.7% were made up of individuals and 10.1% had someone living alone who was 65 years of age or older. The average household size was 2.53 and the average family size was 3.06.

19.7% of the population were under the age of 18, 7.8% from 18 to 24, 26.2% from 25 to 44, 28.7% from 45 to 64, and 17.6% who were 65 years of age or older. The median age was 41.9 years. For every 100 females, the population had 92.1 males. For every 100 females ages 18 and older there were 88.7 males.

The Census Bureau's 2006–2010 American Community Survey showed that (in 2010 inflation-adjusted dollars) median household income was $67,250 (with a margin of error of +/− $8,035) and the median family income was $75,080 (+/− $7,661). Males had a median income of $48,514 (+/− $6,624) versus $41,659 (+/− $6,602) for females. The per capita income for the borough was $31,623 (+/− $3,252). About 5.6% of families and 6.6% of the population were below the poverty line, including 7.6% of those under age 18 and 9.1% of those age 65 or over.

Same-sex couples headed 32 households in 2010, a 60% increase from the 20 counted in 2000.

=== 2000 census ===
As of the 2000 United States census there were 10,987 people, 4,397 households, and 3,025 families residing in the borough. The population density was 3,715.5 inhabitants per square mile (1,434.6/km^{2}). There were 4,497 housing units at an average density of 1,520.8 per square mile (587.2/km^{2}). The racial makeup of the borough was 86.53% White, 3.16% African American, 0.08% Native American, 3.83% Asian, 0.04% Pacific Islander, 3.17% from other races, and 3.19% from two or more races. Hispanic or Latino of any race were 10.06% of the population.

As of the 2000 census, 34.3% of Woodland Park residents were of Italian ancestry, the 18th-highest percentage of any municipality in the United States, and seventh-highest in New Jersey, among all places with more than 1,000 residents identifying their ancestry.

There were 4,397 households, out of which 26.9% had children under the age of 18 living with them, 53.9% were married couples living together, 10.8% had a female householder with no husband present, and 31.2% were non-families. 25.5% of all households were made up of individuals, and 8.2% had someone living alone who was 65 years of age or older. The average household size was 2.49 and the average family size was 3.01.

In the borough the population was spread out, with 19.6% under the age of 18, 7.8% from 18 to 24, 33.9% from 25 to 44, 23.4% from 45 to 64, and 15.3% who were 65 years of age or older. The median age was 38 years. For every 100 females, there were 92.8 males. For every 100 females age 18 and over, there were 90.3 males.

The median income for a household in the borough was $60,273, and the median income for a family was $67,292. Males had a median income of $47,389 versus $36,814 for females. The per capita income for the borough was $29,758. About 3.2% of families and 3.4% of the population were below the poverty line, including 5.0% of those under age 18 and 3.0% of those age 65 or over.

== Government ==
=== Local government ===
The Borough of Woodland Park was chartered by the State of New Jersey to function under the Faulkner Act (formally known as the Option Municipal Charter Law) within the Small Municipality form of government (Plan C), implemented by direct petition as of January 1, 1967. The borough is one of 18 municipalities (of the 564) statewide that use this form of government. The governing body is comprised of the mayor and the borough council, with all positions elected at-large on a partisan basis as part of the November general election. The mayor is elected directly by the voters to a three-year term of office. The borough council includes six members elected to serve three-year terms on a staggered basis, with elections take place in a three-year cycle, with the mayor elected one year and three council seats up for election in the second and third years in the cycle. A government reorganization takes place on January 1 of every year, at which time a mayor-elect or newly elected council members are sworn in.

As of 2026, the Mayor of Woodland Park is Democrat Tracy Kallert, whose term of office ends December 31, 2026. Members of the Woodland Park Borough Council are Council President Louis Torres (D, 2027), Adam Chaabane (D, 2028), Vincent Bennett DeCesare (D, 2027), Edwin Figueroa (D, 2028), Tina Gatti (D, 2027) and Michael Sica (D, 2028).

In May 2022, the borough council selected Adam Chaabane from a list of three candidates nominated by the Democratic municipal committee to fill the seat expiring in December 2022 that had been held by Joseph Spinelli who resigned after serving more two decades in office.

In 2012, borough resident Matthew La Corte was fined for his planting of a political lawn sign. After a nationwide backlash towards the borough and a series of court hearings, the borough agreed to drop the case and waive the nearly $24,000 in fines that had accumulated at $100 per day for each day the signs were up.

=== Federal, state and county representation ===
Woodland Park is located in the 11th Congressional District and is part of New Jersey's 40th state legislative district.

For the 119th United States Congress, New Jersey's 11th congressional district is represented by Analilia Mejia (D, Glen Ridge) who was elected in a 2026 special election to serve for the remainder of the Congress following the resignation Mikie Sherrill (D, Montclair), who was elected Governor of New Jersey in 2025. New Jersey is represented in the United States Senate by Democrats Cory Booker (Newark, term ends 2027) and Andy Kim (Moorestown, term ends 2031).

For the 2026–2027 session, the 40th legislative district of the New Jersey Legislature is represented in the State Senate by Kristin Corrado (R, Totowa) and in the General Assembly by Al Barlas (R, Cedar Grove) and Christopher DePhillips (R, Wyckoff).

Passaic County is governed by a Board of County Commissioners, comprised of seven members who are elected at-large to staggered three-year terms office on a partisan basis, with two or three seats coming up for election each year as part of the November general election in a three-year cycle. At a reorganization meeting held in January, the board selects a Director and Deputy Director from among its members to serve for a one-year term. As of 2026, Passaic County's Commissioners are: Director Cassandra "Sandi" Lazzara (D), Little Falls, term as commissioner ends December 31, 2027; term as director ends 2026), Deputy Director Orlando Cruz (D, Paterson, term as commissioner and as deputy director ends 2026), Rodney DeVore (D, Paterson, 2027), Bruce James (D, Clifton, 2026) Michael Ramaglia (D, West Milford, 2028), Christina Schratz (D, Passaic, 2028) and Nick Veliky (D, Clifton, appointed to a term ending in 2027).

Constitutional officers, elected on a countywide basis, are County Clerk Danielle Ireland-Imhof (D, Hawthorne, 2028), Sheriff Thomas Adamo (D, Wayne, 2027) and Surrogate Zoila S. Cassanova (D, Wayne, 2026).

=== Politics ===
As of March 2011, there were a total of 7,930 registered voters in Woodland Park, of which 2,309 (29.1% vs. 31.0% countywide) were registered as Democrats, 1,448 (18.3% vs. 18.7%) were registered as Republicans and 4,171 (52.6% vs. 50.3%) were registered as Unaffiliated. There were 2 voters registered as Libertarians or Greens. Among the borough's 2010 Census population, 67.1% (vs. 53.2% in Passaic County) were registered to vote, including 83.6% of those ages 18 and over (vs. 70.8% countywide).

Gubernatorial election results for Woodland Park
Year	Republican		Democratic		Third party(ies)	
Year	No.	%	No.	%	No.	%
2025	2,304	45.35%	2,733	53.79%	44	0.87%
2021	2,126	51.43%	1,966	47.56%	42	1.02%
2017	1,463	42.22%	1,912	55.18%	90	2.60%
2013	2,188	59.44%	1,461	39.69%	32	0.87%
2009	2,165	46.90%	2,151	46.60%	300	6.50%
2005	1,648	42.79%	2,081	54.04%	122	3.17%

In the 2012 presidential election, Democrat Barack Obama received 55.4% of the vote (3,119 cast), ahead of Republican Mitt Romney with 43.9% (2,471 votes), and other candidates with 0.8% (44 votes), among the 5,714 ballots cast by the borough's 8,489 registered voters (80 ballots were spoiled), for a turnout of 67.3%. In the 2008 presidential election, Democrat Barack Obama received 2,897 votes (49.0% vs. 58.8% countywide), ahead of Republican John McCain with 2,782 votes (47.0% vs. 37.7%) and other candidates with 68 votes (1.1% vs. 0.8%), among the 5,918 ballots cast by the borough's 8,031 registered voters, for a turnout of 73.7% (vs. 70.4% in Passaic County). In the 2004 presidential election, Democrat John Kerry received 2,686 votes (48.6% vs. 53.9% countywide), ahead of Republican George W. Bush with 2,642 votes (47.8% vs. 42.7%) and other candidates with 37 votes (0.7% vs. 0.7%), among the 5,531 ballots cast by the borough's 7,506 registered voters, for a turnout of 73.7% (vs. 69.3% in the whole county).

Presidential elections results
Year	Republican	Democratic	Third Parties
2024	52.3% 3,476	42.7% 2,840	5.0% 316
2020	46.8% 3,431	50.4% 3,693	2.8% 87
2016	47.6%2,891	49.7% 3,022	2.2% 133
2012	43.9% 2,471	55.4% 3,119	0.8% 44
2008	47.0% 2,782	49.0% 2,897	1.1% 68
2004	47.8% 2,642	48.6% 2,686	0.7% 37

In the 2013 gubernatorial election, Republican Chris Christie received 59.4% of the vote (2,188 cast), ahead of Democrat Barbara Buono with 39.7% (1,461 votes), and other candidates with 0.9% (32 votes), among the 3,769 ballots cast by the borough's 8,648 registered voters (88 ballots were spoiled), for a turnout of 43.6%. In the 2009 gubernatorial election, Republican Chris Christie received 2,165 votes (45.3% vs. 43.2% countywide), ahead of Democrat Jon Corzine with 2,151 votes (45.0% vs. 50.8%), Independent Chris Daggett with 238 votes (5.0% vs. 3.8%) and other candidates with 64 votes (1.3% vs. 0.9%), among the 4,776 ballots cast by the borough's 7,814 registered voters, yielding a 61.1% turnout (vs. 42.7% in the county).

United States Senate election results for Woodland Park1
Year	Republican		Democratic		Third party(ies)	
Year	No.	%	No.	%	No.	%
2024	2,970	48.08%	2,844	46.04%	363	5.88%
2018	2,127	43.01%	2,464	49.83%	354	7.16%
2012	2,076	41.06%	2,907	57.50%	73	1.44%
2006	1,594	44.59%	1,920	53.71%	61	1.71%

United States Senate election results for Woodland Park2
Year	Republican		Democratic		Third party(ies)	
Year	No.	%	No.	%	No.	%
2020	3,013	42.85%	3,841	54.62%	178	2.53%
2014	1,151	39.22%	1,723	58.71%	61	2.08%
2013	960	45.30%	1,132	53.42%	27	1.27%
2008	2,153	41.39%	2,953	56.77%	96	1.85%

== Education ==
Students in public school for pre-kindergarten through eighth grade are educated by the Woodland Park School District. As of the 2024–25 school year, the district, comprised of four schools, had an enrollment of 1,269 students and 109.8 classroom teachers (on an FTE basis), for a student–teacher ratio of 11.6:1. Schools in the district (with 2024–25 enrollment data from the National Center for Education Statistics) are School One with 122 students in grade PreK, Charles Olbon School with 404 students in grades PreK–2, Beatrice Gilmore School with 359 students in grades 3–5 and Memorial Middle School with 374 students in grades 6–8.

For ninth through twelfth grades, public school students attend Passaic Valley Regional High School, which also serves students from Little Falls and Totowa. The school facility is located in Little Falls. As of the 2024–25 school year, the high school had an enrollment of 1,093 students and 82.4 classroom teachers (on an FTE basis), for a student–teacher ratio of 13.3:1.

The Garret Mountain campus of Berkeley College is located in Woodland Park.

== Transportation ==
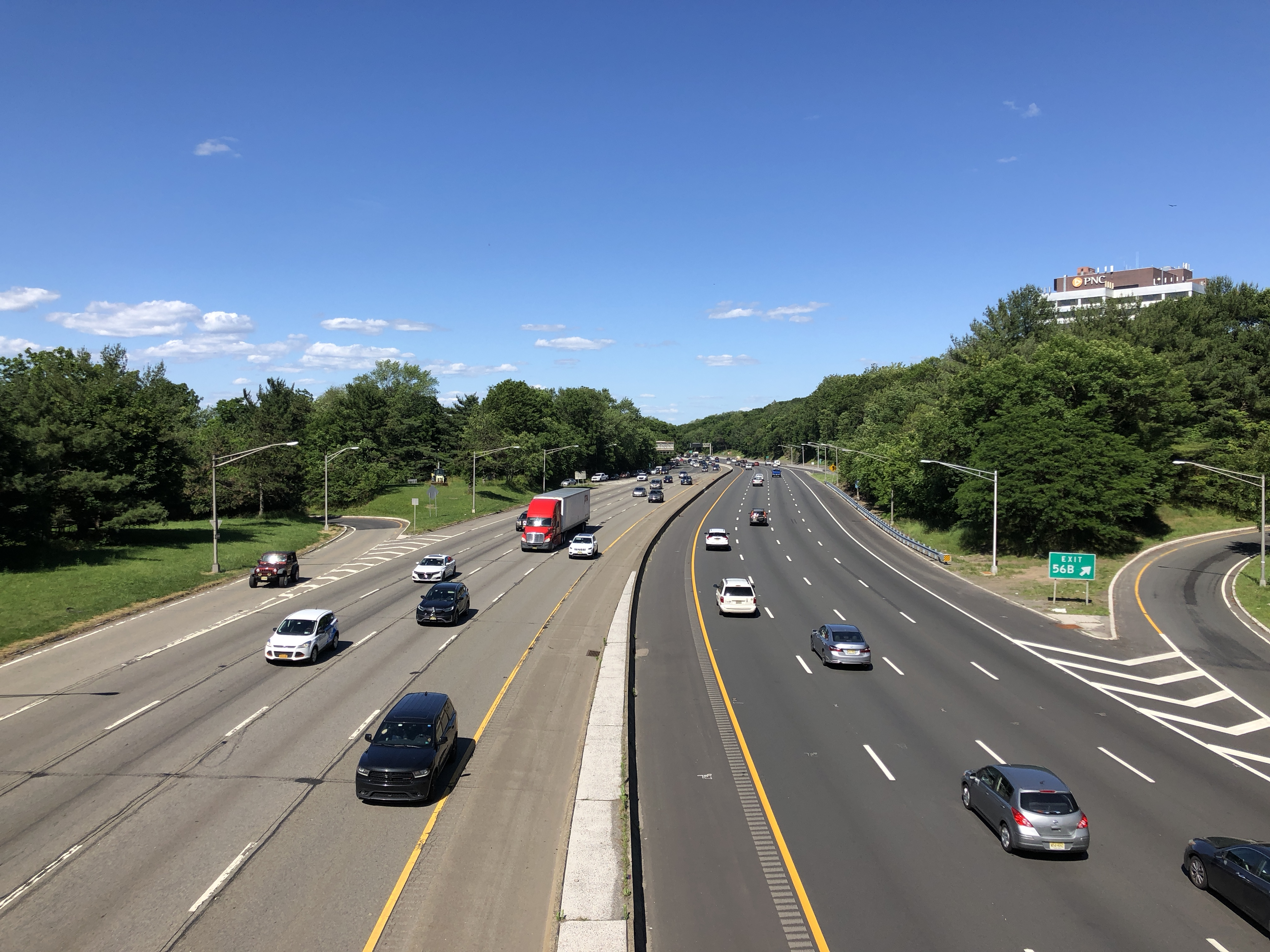
Interstate 80 eastbound in Woodland Park

=== Roads and highways ===
As of May 2010, the borough had a total of 33.47 miles (53.86 km) of roadways, of which 23.88 miles (38.43 km) were maintained by the municipality, 8.22 miles (13.23 km) by Passaic County and 1.37 miles (2.20 km) by the New Jersey Department of Transportation and 1.86 miles (2.99 km) by the New Jersey Turnpike Authority.

Interstate 80 runs along the northwest corner of the borough for 1.0 mile (1.6 km), entering from Totowa to the west and continuing east into Paterson, and includes Exit 56 for County Route 636 (Squirrelwood Road), with Exit 56A for Woodland Park and 56B for Paterson. U.S. Route 46 enters from Little Falls from the west, follows the borough's southern border with Little Falls for 0.7 miles (1.1 km) and continues into Clifton.

=== Public transportation ===
NJ Transit provides bus service to the Port Authority Bus Terminal in Midtown Manhattan on the 191 and 194 routes, with local service offered on the 704 route.

== Notable people ==
People who were born in, residents of, or otherwise closely associated with Woodland Park include:

- Art Argenio (born 1959), politician and chiropractic physician who served as a member of the Florida House of Representatives from 1999 to 2000
- Ravinder Bhalla (born 1973), politician who has represented the 32nd Legislative District in the New Jersey General Assembly since 2026
- Rick Cerone (born 1954), former MLB catcher who played most of his career with the New York Yankees
- Jeff Chase (born 1968), film and television actor who played for the Albany Firebirds of the Arena Football League
- Darius Hamilton (born 1993), defensive end for the Rutgers Scarlet Knights football team
- Keith Hamilton (born 1971), defensive tackle who played his entire 12-season career with the New York Giants
- Kendall Holt (born 1981), former professional boxer who competed from 2001 to 2013, and held the WBO junior welterweight title from 2008 to 2009
- Víctor Santos (born 1976), MLB relief pitcher who has played for the Detroit Tigers, Colorado Rockies, Texas Rangers, Milwaukee Brewers, Pittsburgh Pirates, Cincinnati Reds and the Baltimore Orioles
- Natalia Shaposhnikova (born 1961), former Soviet gymnast and two-time Olympic champion who resides and coaches gymnastics in Woodland Park
- Omar Sheika (born 1977), former professional boxer and multiple-time super middleweight world title challenger
- Frank Tripucka (1927–2013), former pro football quarterback
