= Woodland Park School District =

Woodland Park School District may refer to:

- Woodland Park School District Re-2 - Colorado
- Woodland Park School District (New Jersey)
