= North Jersey =

Northern portions of the U.S. state of New Jersey

Coordinates: 40.7915°N 74.2624°W

- Interactive map of North Jersey
- Country: United States
- State: New Jersey
- Largest cities: Newark and Jersey City
- Counties: List: Bergen; Essex; Hudson; Morris; Passaic; Sussex; Warren
- Elevation: 1,803 ft (550 m)

Population (2024)
  - Total: 3,905,478
- Time zone: UTC−5 (EST)
  - Summer (DST): UTC−4 (EDT)

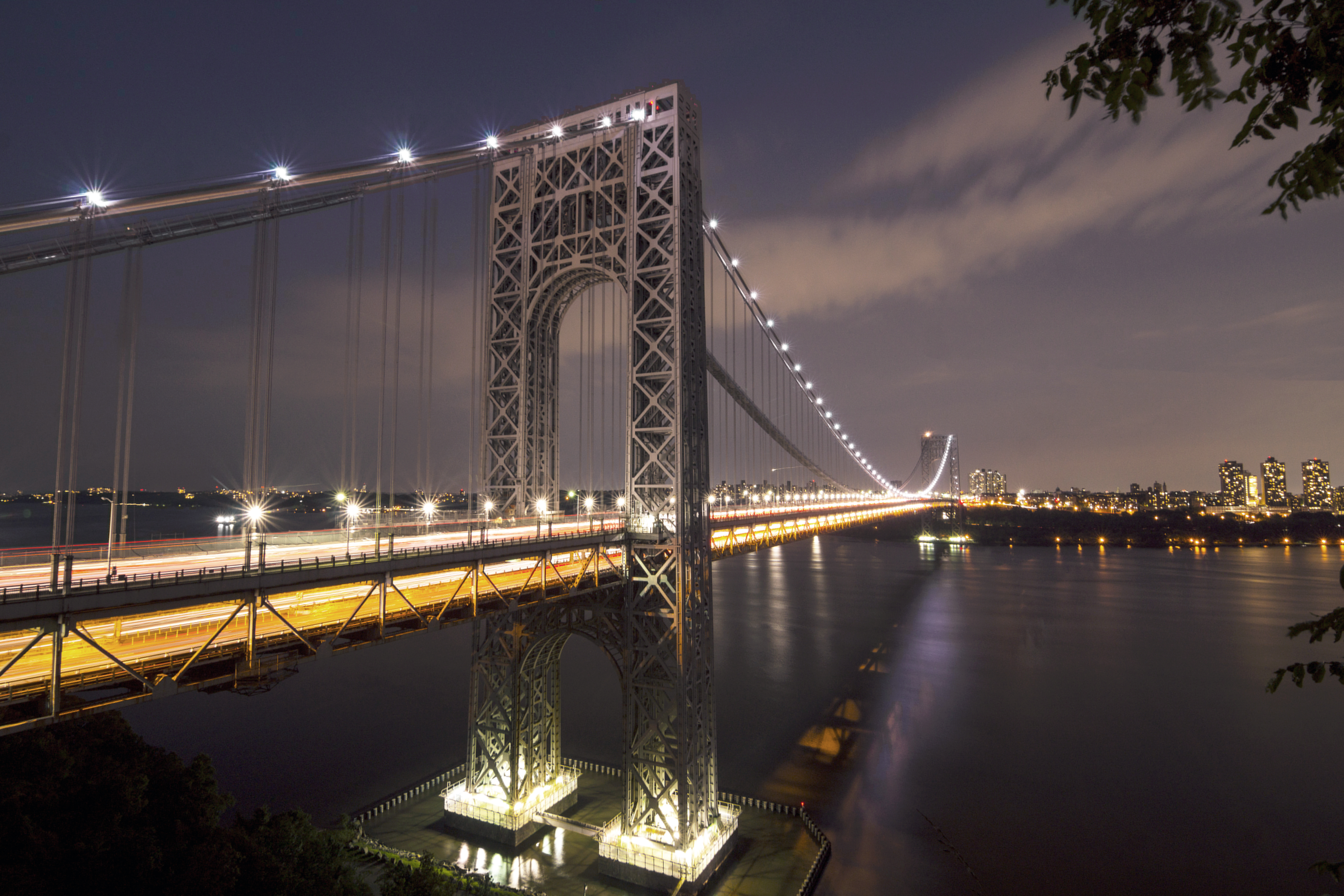
The George Washington Bridge, the world's busiest vehicle bridge, connects Fort Lee in North Jersey with Upper Manhattan in New York City.

Northern New Jersey, commonly referred to simply as North Jersey, comprises the northern portions of the U.S. state of New Jersey between the upper Delaware River and the Atlantic Ocean. As a distinct toponym, North Jersey is a colloquial one rather than an administrative one, reflecting geographical and perceived cultural and other differences between it and the southern part of the state.

North Jersey is characterized by its position, both geographically and culturally, within the greater New York City metropolitan area, as well as its high economic output, including its regional economic engines of Paramus in Bergen County, which had $6 billion in annual retail sales as of 2018 and Jersey City, whose financial district has been nicknamed "Wall Street West", Newark Liberty International Airport in Newark, and Port Newark–Elizabeth Marine Terminal.

Bergen County is the most populous county in both North Jersey and the state and serves as the western terminus for the George Washington Bridge, the world's busiest motor vehicle bridge, which connects Fort Lee, New Jersey to Upper Manhattan in New York City. Newark, located in Essex County, is New Jersey's most populous city. Jersey City and Paterson, located in Hudson and Passaic counties, in North Jersey, are the second and third most populous cities in the region and state, after Newark.

The exact definition of which counties constitute North Jersey is a subject of debate. Definitions of the North Jersey region of the state most consistently include Bergen, Essex, Hudson, Morris, Passaic, Sussex, and Warren counties, though definitions of North Jersey frequently vary and may include other New Jersey counties in the New York metropolitan area that are sometimes differentiated as or considered Central Jersey, including Middlesex County, Union County, Monmouth County, Somerset County, Hunterdon County, and Mercer County.

== Geography ==
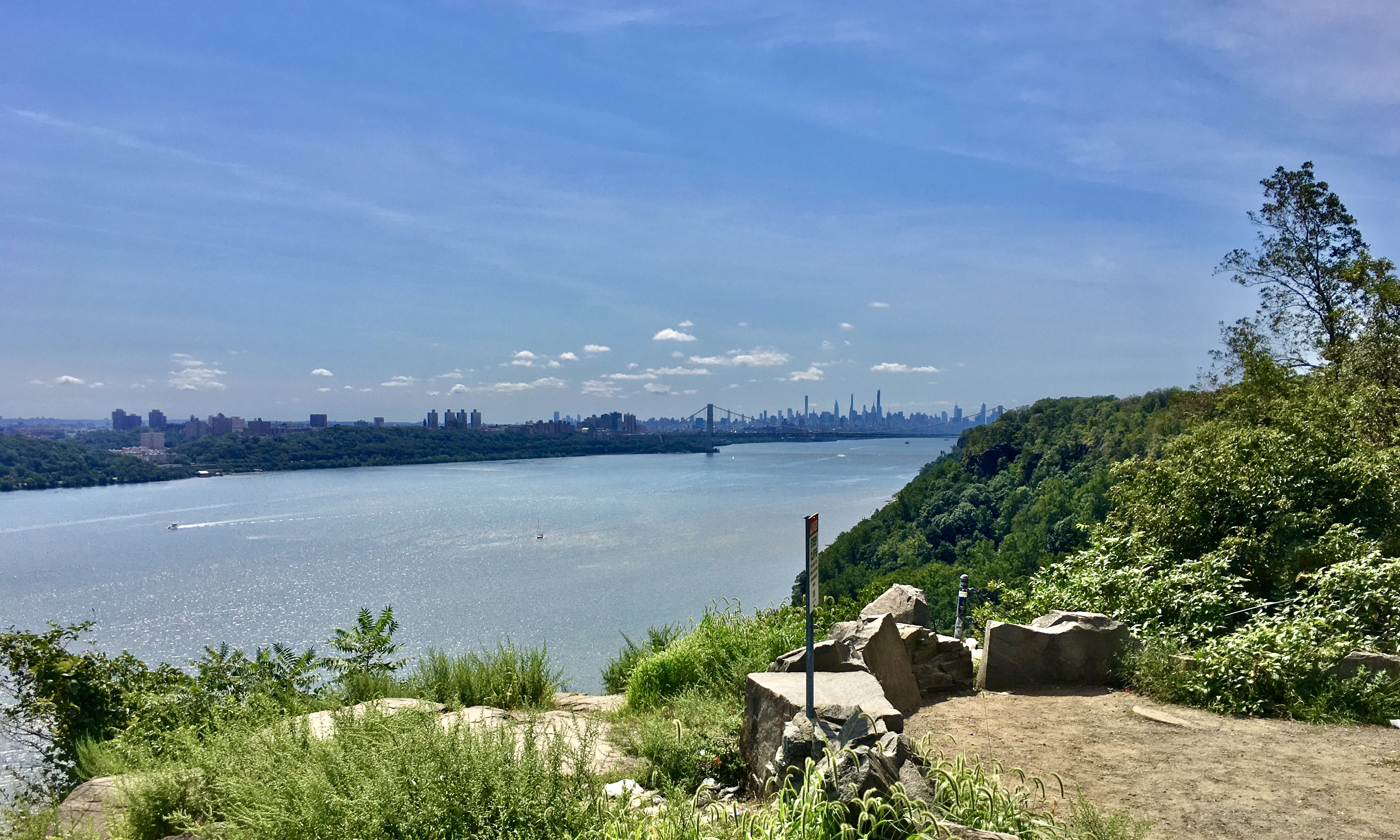
On the eastern flank of North Jersey, the Midtown Manhattan skyline, the George Washington Bridge, and the Hudson River are seen from the Rockefeller Overlook on the Palisades in Englewood Cliffs, Bergen County.

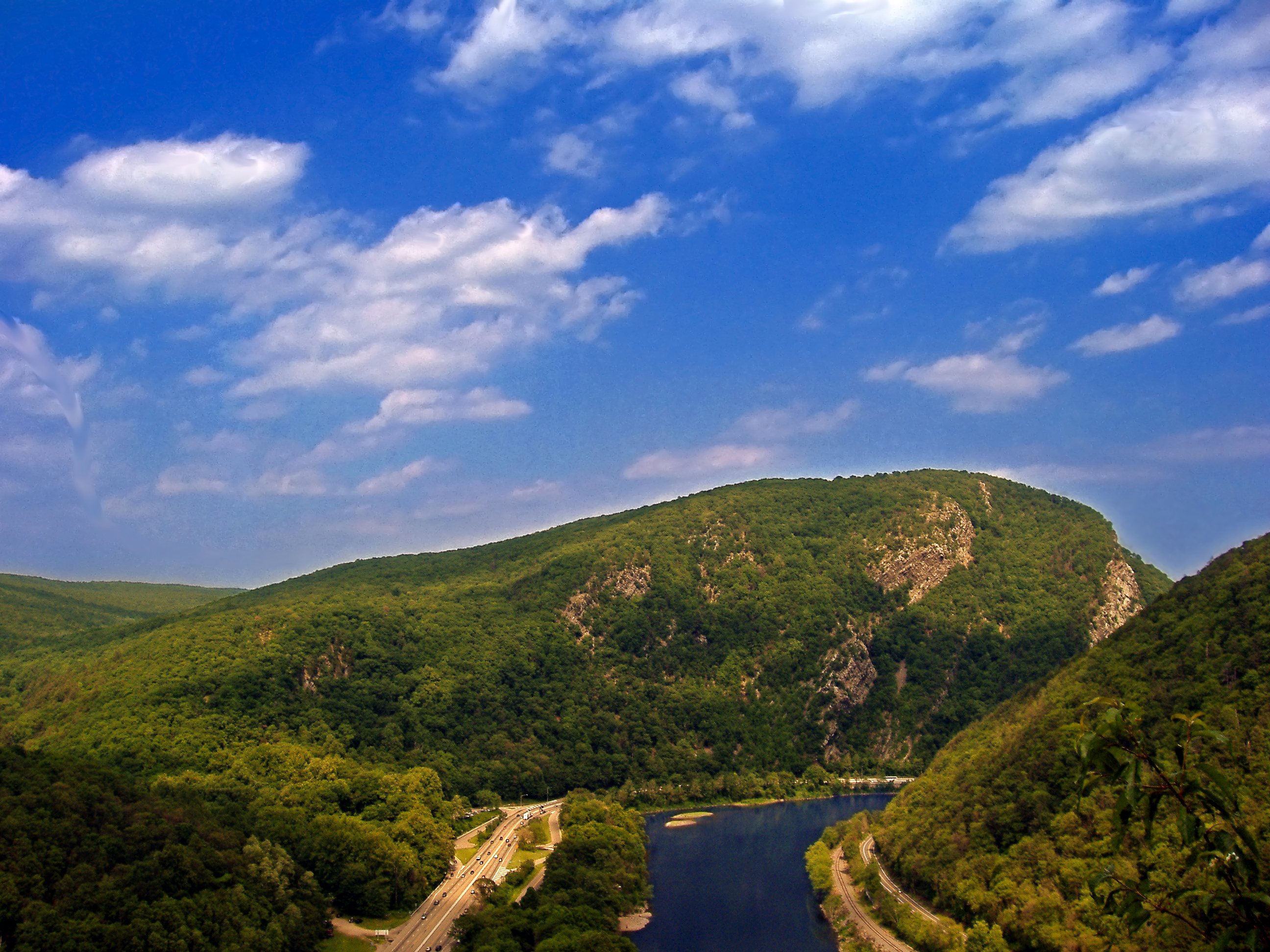
On the western flank of North Jersey, the Delaware Water Gap is located at the border of Warren County, New Jersey and the Lehigh Valley in eastern Pennsylvania.

Geologically, North Jersey is largely in the Piedmont Province, the Highlands Province, and the Ridge and Valley Province. Depending on definitions, some are counted as being in the Atlantic coastal plain.

North Jersey has a Humid Continental Climate (Dfb) by Köppen.

=== Definitions ===
One particular definition of North Jersey includes all points in New Jersey north of I-295 in the western part of the state and all points north of I-195 in the eastern part of the state. Another definition uses the old 1956-era 201 telephone area code, not the modern 201 area code, and all its additions, as this area code loosely included all of New Jersey north of Trenton. Some residents of the farthest northern tier of counties use a narrower definition, counting only that area north of the mouth of the Raritan River. Conversely, people in South Jersey and within the Philadelphia metropolitan area, when using a two-portion approach that excludes Central Jersey as a separate category, may define North Jersey as consisting of Ocean County and every county north of it, essentially placing all New Jersey counties that are within the New York metropolitan area under the definition of North Jersey. The state is also sometimes described as having North Jersey and South Jersey separated from each other by Central Jersey.

=== Further subdivision ===
In 2008, the New Jersey State Department of Tourism divided the state into six tourist regions with the Gateway and Skylands regions included in North Jersey.

=== Counties most consistently defined as North Jersey counties ===
The following counties are most consistently considered North Jersey:

- Bergen County
- Essex County
- Hudson County
- Morris County
- Passaic County
- Sussex County
- Warren County
- Union County is sometimes considered as a transitional county between North Jersey and Central Jersey, or it may be grouped entirely with one of the two regions

== History ==
North Jersey was the site of some of the earliest European settlements in what would become the United States of America. Its colonial history started after Henry Hudson sailed through Newark Bay in 1609. Although Hudson was British, he worked for the Netherlands, so he claimed the land for the Dutch as part of the provincial colony of New Netherland, with original settlements centered in Bergen in today's Hudson County. In 1664, the region became part of the Province of New Jersey.

During the American Revolutionary War, New Jersey was a strategic location between New York City, and the Continental Congress in Philadelphia. Important materials necessary to the war effort were sometimes produced in North Jersey, and the Continental Army made its home in North Jersey for part of the war. George Washington, commanding general of the Continental Army, maintained his headquarters at Ford Mansion in Morristown for part of the Revolutionary War, from December 1779 to June 1780. In the northwestern part of the state, iron mines and foundries supplied raw material for the Continental Army's guns and ammunition.

The American Industrial Revolution started by the founding of the North Jersey town of Paterson. Today, the United States and the world enjoy the fruit born of seeds planted in North Jersey during the Industrial Revolution. Alexander Hamilton, Secretary for the Treasury and President of the Bank of New York during the end of the eighteenth century, selected the Great Falls area, also known as the Passaic Falls, for an ambitious experiment. He promoted the natural power of the Great Falls as an excellent location for textile mills and other manufacturers.

Paterson attracted skilled craftsmen and engineers from Europe to run the mills and produced a large concentration of creative and able people. During the mid-nineteenth century, many of the engines and materials that would be used to colonize a continent were made here. Thomas Edison installed one of the first hydroelectric power plants in the world, which still provides electricity today, using the Great Falls as an energy source.

In West Orange, Edison created the first technical research and development facility with his invention factory. Electric light, improved motion pictures, and sound recording, were among the hundreds of inventions produced here.

== Demographics ==
The seven counties that are most commonly included in North Jersey have an estimated total population of 3,905,478 as of 2024; this rises to 4,499,638 with the inclusion of Union County. As of the 2000 U.S. Census, the demographics of all the seven main counties combined are 66.8% White, 18.5% Hispanic or Latino, 15.4% African American, 6.6% Asian, 0.2% Native American, and 0.1% Pacific Islander.

== Population ==
Municipalities with over 30,000 population
2017 Rank	Municipality	County	Population in 2017	Population in 2010	Municipal Type
1	Newark	Essex	285,154	277,140	City
2	Jersey City	Hudson	270,753	247,597	City
3	Paterson	Passaic	148,678	146,199	City
4	Clifton	Passaic	86,607	84,136	City
5	Passaic	Passaic	71,247	69,781	City
6	Union City	Hudson	70,387	66,455	City
7	Bayonne	Hudson	67,186	63,024	City
8	East Orange	Essex	65,378	64,270	City
9	North Bergen	Hudson	63,659	60,773	Township
10	Hoboken	Hudson	55,131	50,005	City
11	Wayne	Passaic	55,072	54,717	Township
12	Irvington	Essex	54,865	53,926	Township
13	West New York	Hudson	54,227	49,708	Town
14	Parsippany-Troy Hills	Morris	53,201	53,238	Township
15	Bloomfield	Essex	50,970	47,315	Township
16	West Orange	Essex	48,425	46,207	Township
17	Hackensack	Bergen	45,248	43,010	City
18	Kearny	Hudson	42,670	40,648	Town
19	Teaneck	Bergen	41,311	39,776	Township
20	Montclair	Essex	39,227	37,669	Township
21	Fort Lee	Bergen	37,907	35,345	Borough
22	Belleville	Essex	36,498	35,926	Township
23	Fair Lawn	Bergen	33,710	32,457	Borough
24	Garfield	Bergen	32,393	30,487	City
25	City of Orange	Essex	30,813	30,134	Township
26	Livingston	Essex	30,142	29,366	Township

County population
Rank	County	Population in 2022	County seat	Area
1	Bergen	952,997	Hackensack	234 sq mi (606 km^{2})
2	Essex	849,477	Newark	126 sq mi (326 km^{2})
3	Hudson	703,366	Jersey City	47 sq mi (122 km^{2})
4	Passaic	513,936	Paterson	185 sq mi (479 km^{2})
5	Morris	511,151	Morristown	469 sq mi (1,215 km^{2})
6	Sussex	146,084	Newton	521 sq mi (1,349 km^{2})
7	Warren	110,926	Belvidere	358 sq mi (927 km^{2})

== Professional sports fans ==
Sports allegiances are often divided between the northern and southern portions of the state. The 2009 World Series divided the people of New Jersey, because South Jersey residents generally root for the Philadelphia Phillies, while North Jersey residents usually root for the New York Yankees or the New York Mets. A similar trend exists for most other major sports, with North Jersey residents supporting the Brooklyn Nets or the New York Knicks in basketball, the New Jersey Devils, or the New York Rangers in hockey, the New York Red Bulls or New York City FC in soccer, and the New York Giants or the New York Jets in football.

== Notable North Jerseyans ==
- People from Bergen County
- People from Essex County
- People from Hudson County
- People from Morris County
- People from Passaic County
- People from Sussex County
- People from Warren County

== See also ==
- Central Jersey
- South Jersey
