= Rifle Camp Park =

County park in New Jersey, U.S.

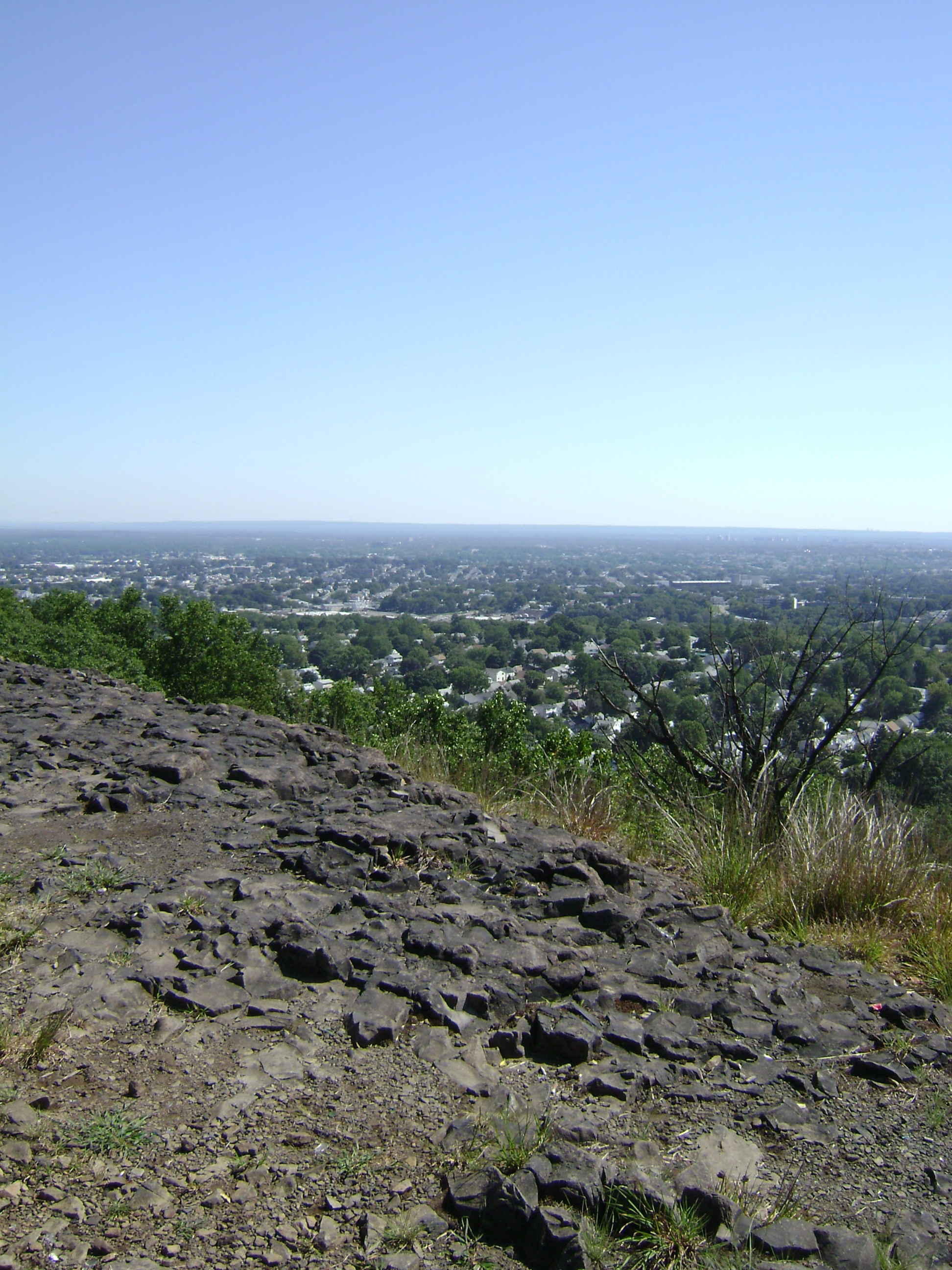
- View from Garret Mountain in Rifle Camp Park.
- Interactive map of Rifle Camp Park
- Type: County park
- Location: Woodland Park and Clifton in New Jersey, United States
- Coordinates: 40°53′04″N 74°10′56″W
- Area: 169 acres (68 ha)
- Created: 1928
- Operator: Passaic County Parks & Recreation
- Open: All year
- Parking: Five parking areas (NO RV Parking)
- Website: Rifle Camp Park

Rifle Camp Park is a 225-acre (0.9 km^{2}) county park of Passaic County, New Jersey. It is located mostly within Woodland Park, but its eastern edge extends into Clifton as well. The park includes hiking trails, an observatory, nature center, fitness trail, amphitheater, a bird watching blind, and an overnight camping facility for local scout organizations.

== History ==
Rifle Camp Park was established from the same land acquired for the creation of the nearly adjacent Garret Mountain Reservation. The land was originally part of the estate of Catholina Lambert, the owner of a silk mill in Paterson. After Lambert’s death in 1923, the estate was sold to the City of Paterson, which eventually transferred the land to Passaic County in 1928. In 1929, landscape architect firm Olmsted Associates, the successor to the practice of Frederick Law Olmsted, was commissioned with the development of the parkland, completing work in 1934.

Ever since the division of the Lambert estate between Garret Mountain Reservation and Rifle Camp Park, it has been proposed to connect the two. As of 2011, the Borough of Woodland Park has been discussing ways to link the almost adjacent properties.

=== Colonial Past ===
The area of Rifle Camp Park served as a location where Washington’s troops could observe British movements during the Revolutionary War in 1780. The name ‘Rifle Camp’ comes from the fact that Major James Parr’s rifle corps camped for a short time in the vicinity of the Great Notch, just to the south of what would eventually become the park. Parr and his riflemen (the rifle corps originally commanded by Colonel Daniel Morgan) previously achieved notice in the Sullivan Expedition in 1779. In October, 1780, Parr and his rifle corps had been assigned to protect the strategic pass at the Great Notch from British incursion, but ultimately stayed for just one week. On October 17, 1780, the rifle corps left the area, being ordered to join General Lafayette’s Light Corps in the vicinity of present-day Goffle Brook Park on the opposite side of the Passaic River.

The land that would become Rifle Camp Park was also host to the farm of Thomas Ryder, a loyalist. It is at Ryder’s farm that Joshua Hett Smith, a lawyer from Haverstraw, New York who aided the treasonous Benedict Arnold and British Major John André, was supposedly granted hospitality during his escape from American imprisonment.

== Description ==
Rifle Camp Park sits on the ridgeline of Garret Mountain, a section of First Watchung Mountain. It is extensively forested, containing only a few open areas. Due to the local geology, large trap rock outcrops are abundant throughout the property. The eastern limit of the parkland consists of nearly vertical basalt cliffs that provide panoramic views of the surrounding area. To the west is the Great Notch Reservoir, whose headwaters partly lie within the park and comprise the source of the Third River. Along the south end of the park there is a former quarry being turned over to housing development.

The park is accessed via Rifle Camp Road in Woodland Park, near the intersection with Overmount Ave. The main driveway leads to five parking areas, with the first area adjacent to the amphitheater and the fifth area adjacent to the observatory/nature center.

== See also ==
- Garret Mountain Reservation
