= Dutch Reformed Church at Romopock =

Historic church in New Jersey, United States

- Ramapo Reformed Church
- U.S. National Register of Historic Places
- New Jersey Register of Historic Places
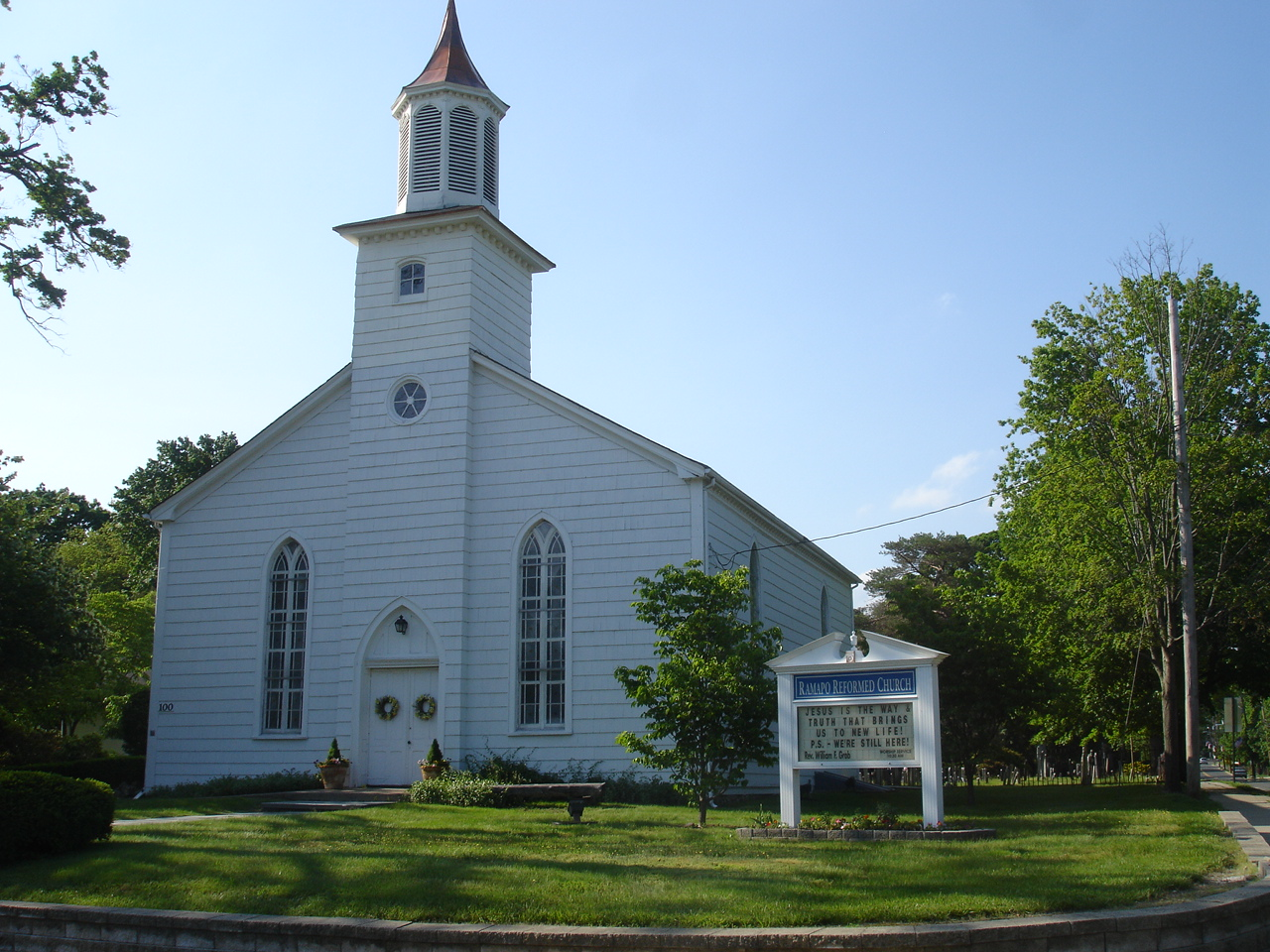
- The Ramapo Reformed Church in Mahwah in summer 2011

- Location within Bergen County, New Jersey Location within New Jersey Location within the United States
- Location: Island Road at West Ramapo Avenue, Mahwah, New Jersey
- Coordinates: 41°05′41″N 74°09′09″W
- Area: 5 acres (2.0 ha)
- Built: 1798
- Architects: Baldwin, David
- Architectural style: Gothic
- NRHP reference No.: 85002000
- NJRHP No.: 560

Significant dates
- Added to NRHP: September 5, 1985
- Designated NJRHP: July 7, 1985

Ramapo Reformed Church (formerly the Dutch Reformed Church at Romopock) is a historic church on Island Road at West Ramapo Avenue in Mahwah, Bergen County, New Jersey, United States. The church was built in 1798 and added to the National Register of Historic Places on September 5, 1985.

== See also ==
- National Register of Historic Places listings in Bergen County, New Jersey
