= Great Falls (Passaic River) =

Waterfall and national park in Paterson, New Jersey, United States

- Paterson Great Falls; National Historical Park
- U.S. National Register of Historic Places
- U.S. National Historic Landmark District
- U.S. National Historical Park
- New Jersey Register of Historic Places
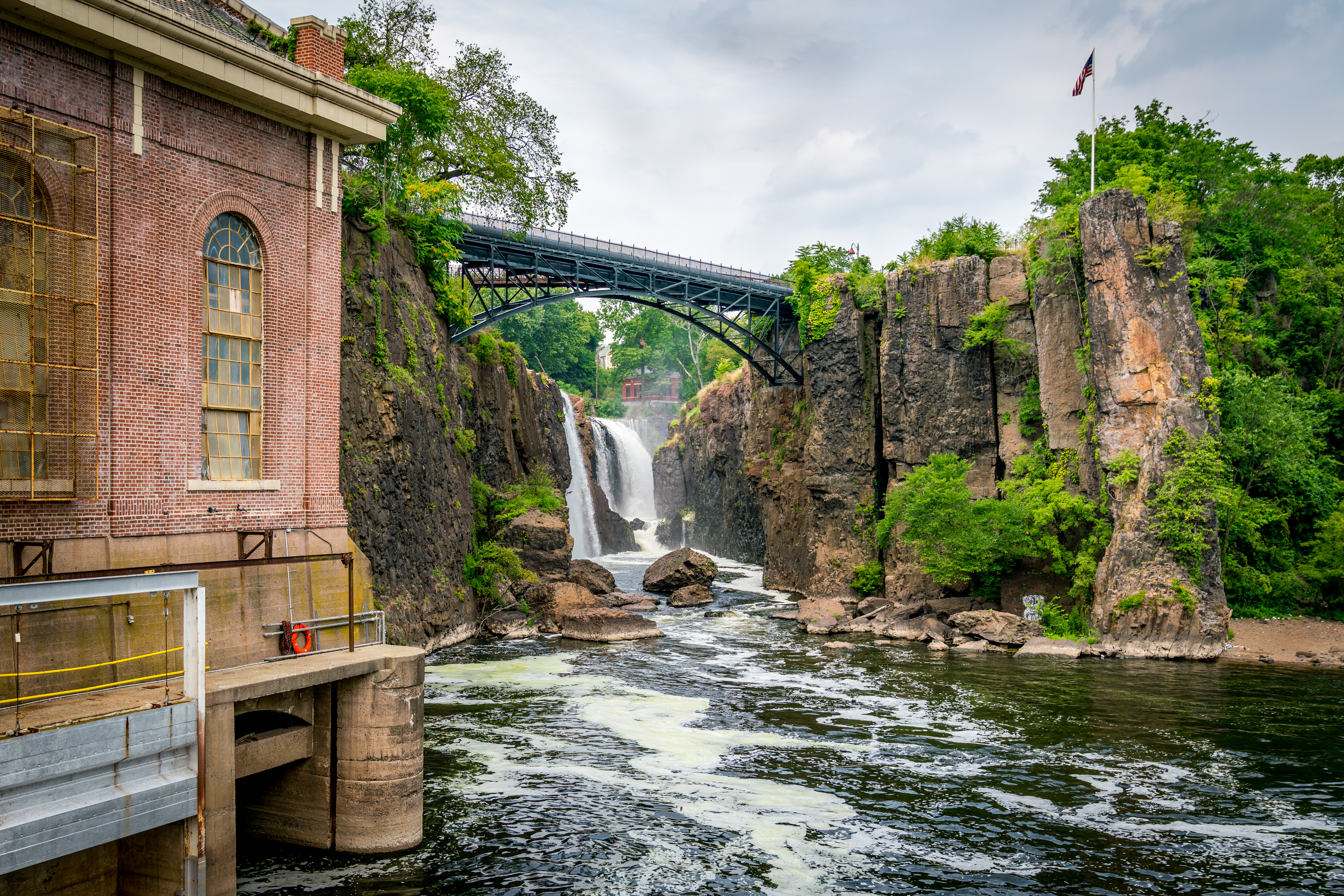
- The Great Falls of the Passaic River.

- Location within Passaic County, New Jersey Location within New Jersey Location within the United States
- Location: Paterson, New Jersey
- Coordinates: 40°54′58″N 74°10′54″W
- Area: 36.30 acres (0.1469 km^{2})
- Visitation: 189,721 (2025)
- Website: Paterson Great Falls National Historical Park
- NRHP reference No.: 70000391 (original); 86001507 (increase)
- NJRHP No.: 2383

Significant dates
- Added to NRHP: April 14, 1970
- Boundary increase: August 14, 1986
- Designated NHLD: May 11, 1976
- Designated NHP: November 7, 2011
- Designated NJRHP: May 27, 1971

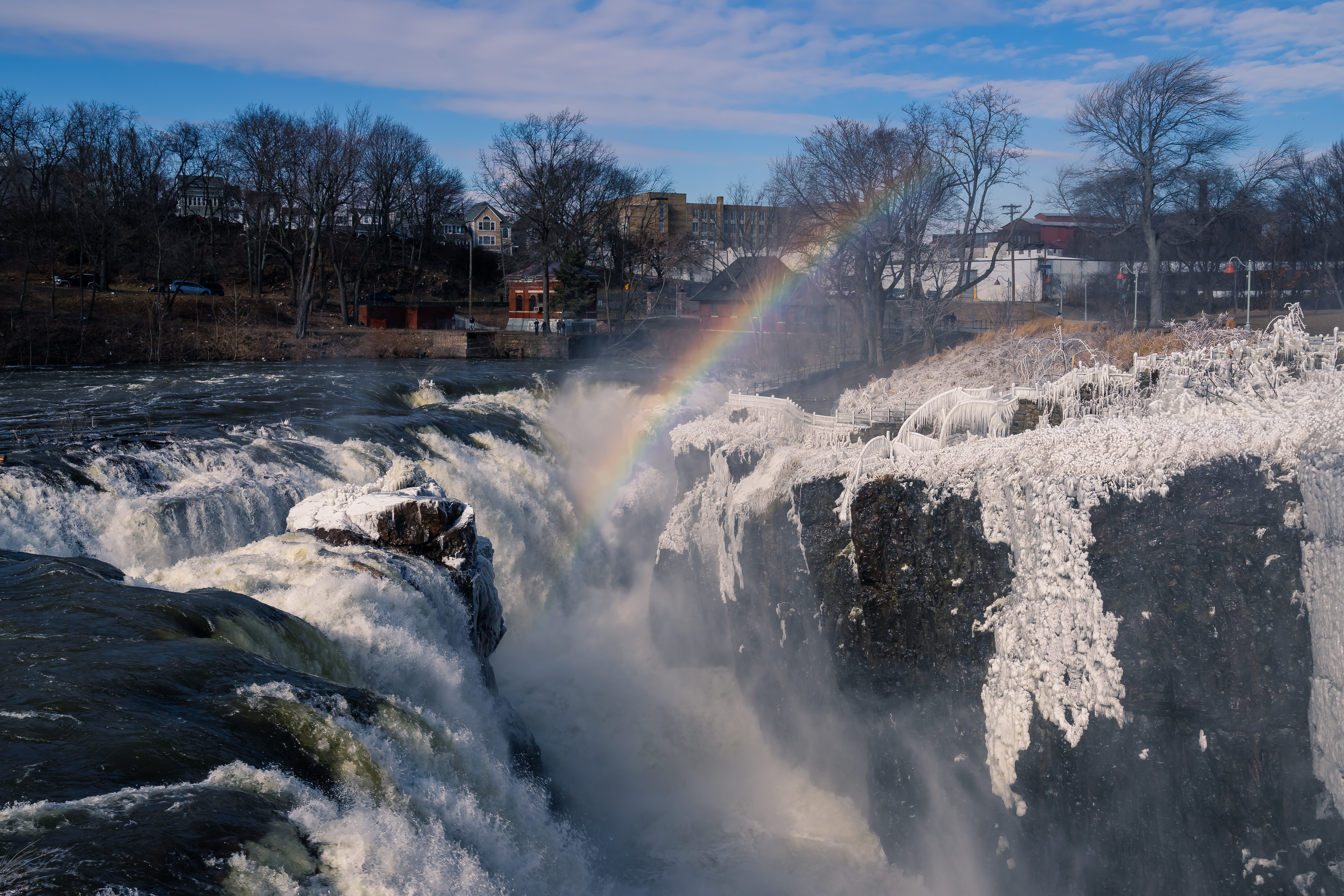
The Great Falls in January 2019 with a characteristic rainbow

The Great Falls of the Passaic River is a 77-foot-high (23 m) waterfall on the Passaic River in the city of Paterson in Passaic County, New Jersey. One of the United States' largest waterfalls, it played a significant role in the early industrial development of New Jersey starting in the earliest days of the nation. The falls and surrounding area are protected as part of the Paterson Great Falls National Historical Park, administered by the National Park Service. Congress authorized its establishment in 2009.

In 1967 it was designated a National Natural Landmark together with Garret Mountain Reservation. The falls and the surrounding neighborhood have also been designated as a National Historic Landmark District since 1976. The Great Falls' raceway and power systems were designated a National Historic Civil Engineering Landmark and a National Historic Mechanical Engineering Landmark in 1977. The Great Falls National Historic Park also includes the adjacent Hinchliffe Stadium, one of four still-standing Negro league baseball stadiums.

== History ==
=== Formation and early history ===
The falls were formed at the end of the last ice age approximately 13,000 years ago. Previously, the Passaic had followed a shorter course through the Watchung Mountains near present-day Summit. As the glacier receded, the river's previous course was blocked by a newly formed moraine. A large lake, called Glacial Lake Passaic, formed behind the Watchungs. As the ice receded, the river found a new circuitous route around the north end of the Watchungs, carving the falls through the underlying basalt, which was formed approximately 200 million years ago.

The falls later became the site of a habitation of the historic Lenape Native Americans, who followed earlier indigenous cultures in the region. Later, in the colonial era, Dutch settlers developed a community here beginning in the 1690s.

=== Industrial development ===
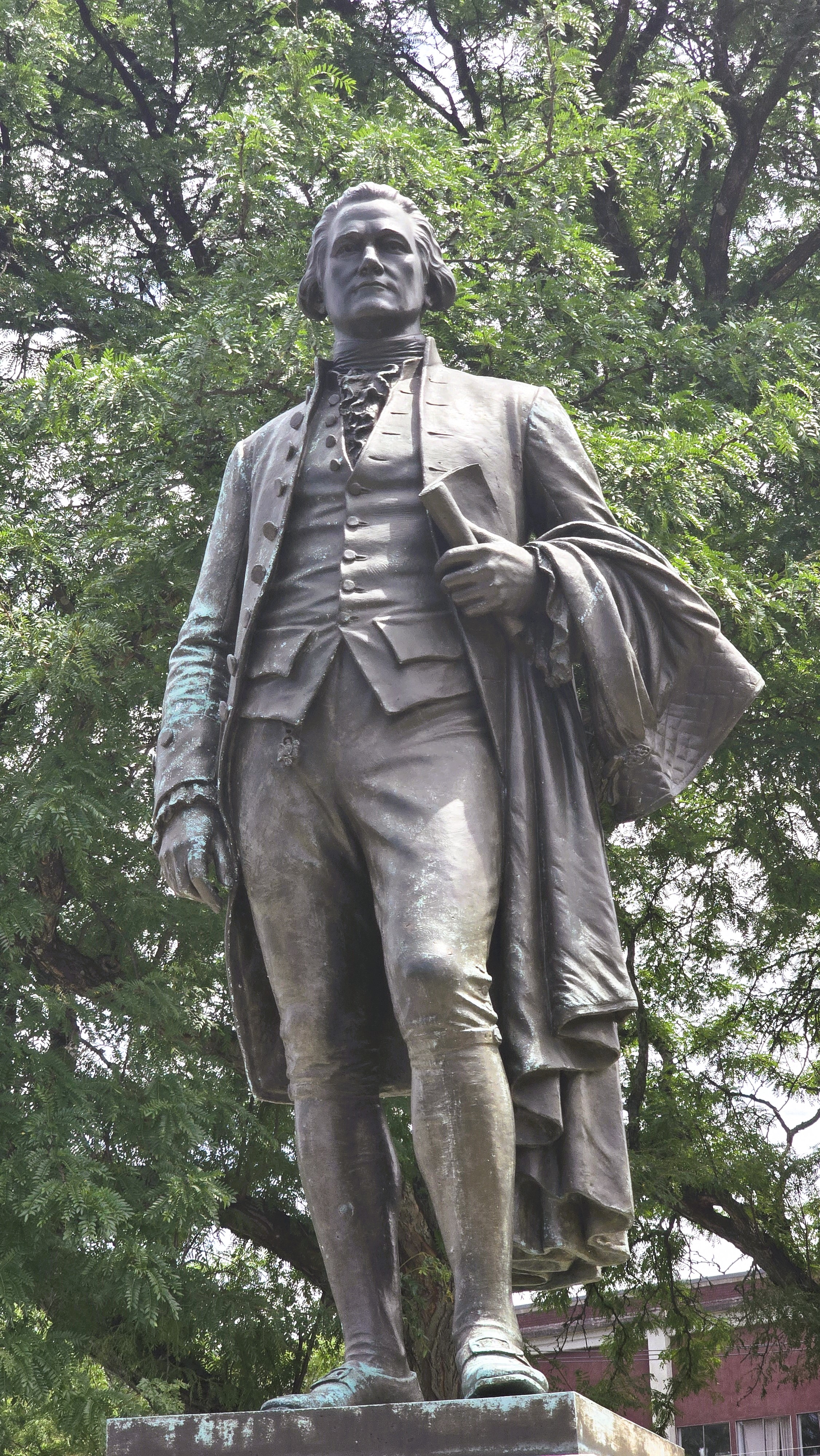
Statue of Alexander Hamilton, by Franklin Simmons, overlooking the falls

In 1778, Alexander Hamilton visited the falls and was impressed by its potential for industry. Later when Hamilton was the nation's Secretary of Treasury, he selected the site of the nation's first planned industrial city, which he called a "national manufactory." In 1791, Hamilton helped found the Society for the Establishment of Useful Manufactures (S.U.M.), a state-chartered private corporation to fulfill this vision. The town of Paterson was founded by the society and named after New Jersey Governor William Paterson, in appreciation of his efforts to promote the society.

Hamilton commissioned civil engineer Pierre Charles L'Enfant, responsible for the layout of the new capital at Washington, D.C., to design the system of canals known as raceways to supply the power for the watermills in the new town. As a result, Paterson became the nucleus for a burgeoning mill industry. In 1792, David Godwin was commissioned to build the first water-powered cotton spinning mill in New Jersey. He subsequently built the first dam on the falls; it was a structure made of wood.

In 1812, this was the site of the state's first continuous roll paper mill. Other 19th-century industries that produced goods using the falls as a power source include the Rogers Locomotive Works (1832), Colt's Manufacturing Company, for the Colt revolver (1837), and the construction of the USS Holland (SS-1) (1898). The oldest extant structure in the historic district is the Phoenix Mill, built in 1813.

Workers were exploited, especially new immigrants from Europe, who often did not speak English. They began to seek better working conditions. The industrial area became the site of labor unrest, and it was a center for the 1913 Paterson silk strike. Facing harsh conditions in factories, immigrant workers staged numerous strikes during and after the Great War, adding to social tensions of the time. They organized the first labor movements in the United States.

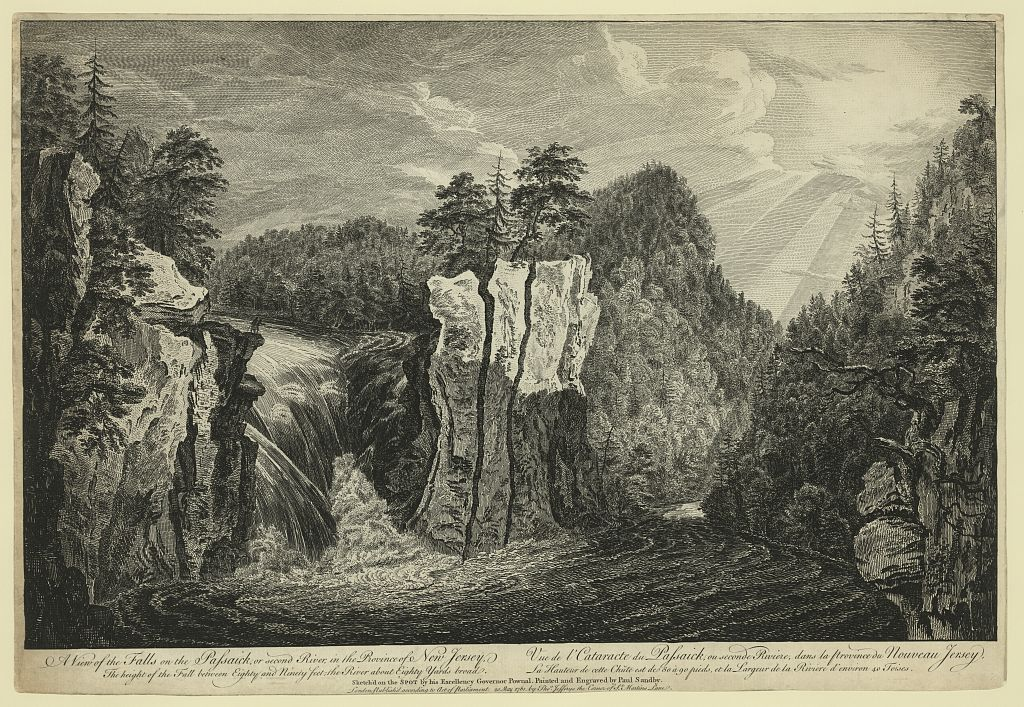
Engraving after a drawing of the falls made by Thomas Pownall in the 1750s

The SUM society continued operation until 1945, when its charter and property were sold to the city of Paterson. The area fell into disuse during a period of restructuring that resulted in a steep decline of industry in the region during the mid to late 20th century. In 1971, concerned residents established the Great Falls Preservation and Development Corporation to restore and redevelop the historic mill buildings and raceways as artifacts of industrial history.

=== Great Falls State Park ===
The State of New Jersey announced plans for a new urban state park in Paterson surrounding the Great Falls, called Great Falls State Park, in 2007. The master plan for the park called for utilizing surrounding industrial areas for parklands that include a trail network and recreation areas, and creating new areas to view the falls. These plans were superseded by the establishment of Great Falls National Historical Park.

=== National Historical Park ===
On March 30, 2009, President Obama signed the Omnibus Public Land Management Act authorizing the falls as a national historical park, which would provide additional federal protections for the 77-foot waterfall. By 2011, Great Falls State Park and other land along the Passaic River were transferred to the federal government for the creation of the Paterson Great Falls National Historical Park. Formal establishment as a unit of the National Park System required action by the Secretary of the Interior, which took place November 7, 2011, when Secretary Salazar formally accepted lands on behalf of the United States, and dedicated the park as the nation's 397th park system unit.

== Viewing the falls ==
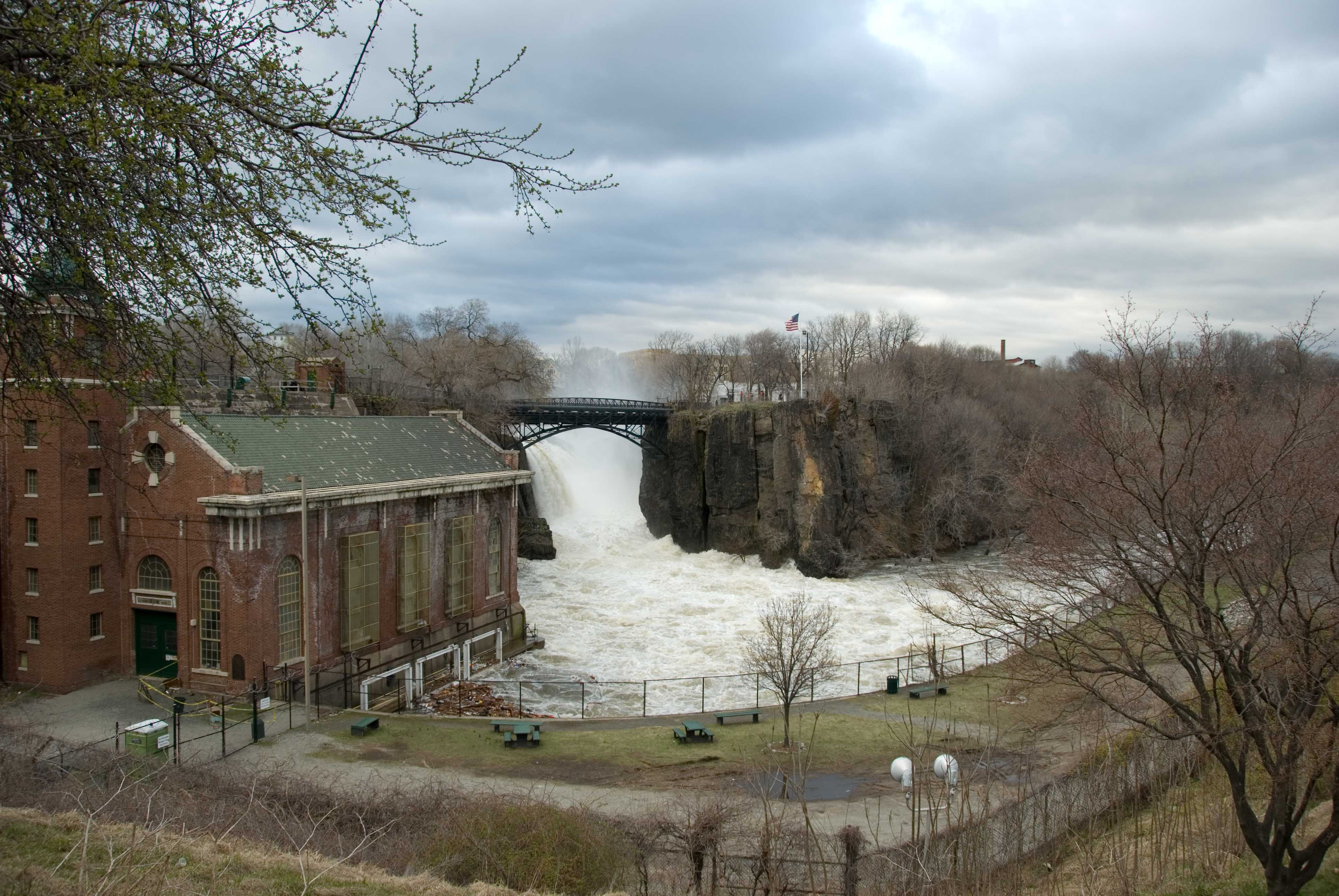
Viewing area after 8 inches (200 mm) of rain drenched Northern New Jersey during the second week of April 2007.

The Falls are viewable from Haines Overlook Park on the south and Mary Ellen Kramer Park on the north. Drive-by viewing is available from McBride Avenue where it crosses the river just above the Falls. A footbridge over the Falls gorge (historically, the eighth such bridge to span this chasm) also serves as an outlook point. A visitor center at the corner of Spruce and McBride avenues, in the Great Falls Historic District, provides a historical overview of the falls and the industrial and cultural history of Paterson. A record 177,000 visitors went to the Great Falls in 2016.

== National Natural Landmark ==
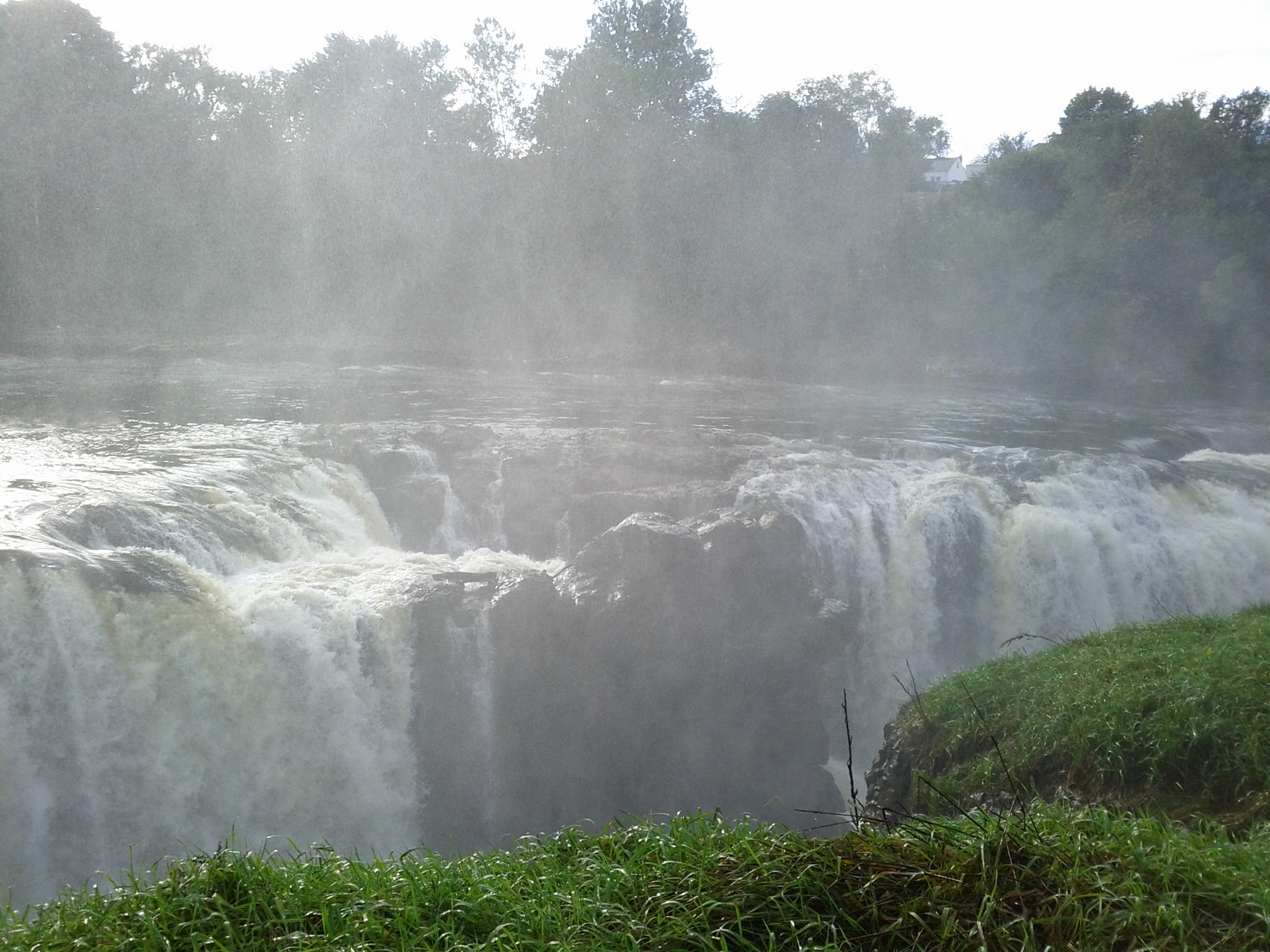
The falls after Hurricane Irene.

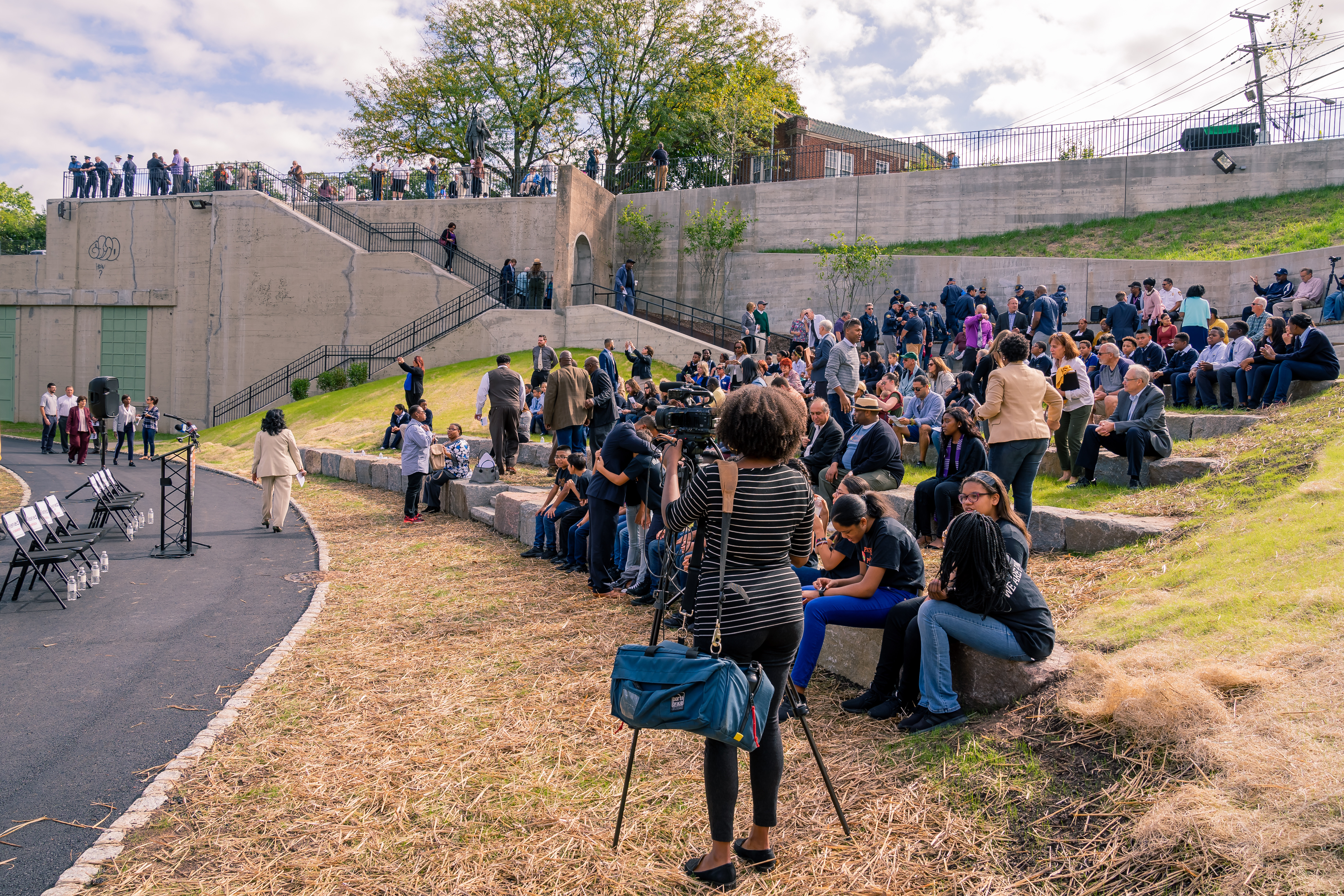
The new amphitheater opened in October 2018 at Overlook Park.

The Great Falls of Paterson – Garret Mountain is a National Natural Landmark designated in January 1967 and expanded in April 1967 to include nearby Garret Mountain. Together they help demonstrate how jointed basaltic lava flow shaped the geology of the area during the Early Mesozoic period through both extrusion and intrusion.

The designation protects the site from federal development, but not from local and state development. Redevelopment of the decayed adjacent industrial areas has been an ongoing controversial topic. An attempt in the 1990s to redevelop the adjacent Allied Textile Printing Co. (ATP) facility, destroyed by fire in the 1980s, into prefabricated townhouses was initially approved by the city but later repelled by a coalition of local citizens seeking to preserve the historic character of the district.

== Hydroelectric facility ==
The hydroelectric plant at the falls is operated by Eagle Creek Renewable Energy, which is considering commissioning another facility downstream at the Dundee Dam.

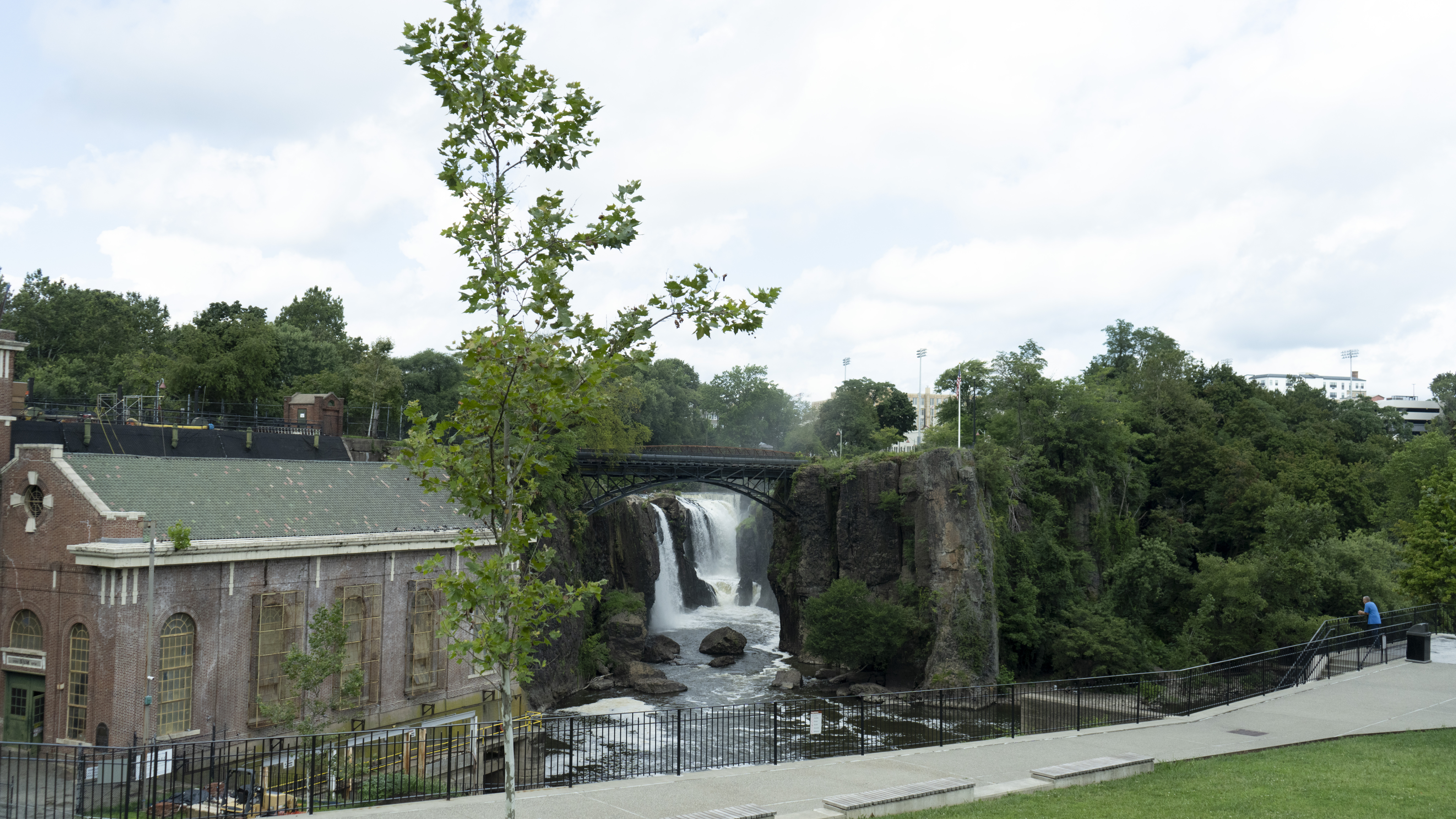
Great Falls Park as seen from Spruce Street.

The Great Falls hydroelectric plant has three Kaplan type turbines with a total capacity of 10.95 Mwe. Flow through each turbine is 710 cfs, with a total flow of 2,130 cfs, 1,377 MGD. Three 8.5' diameter penstocks feed the turbines, with a velocity 12.5 ft/sec and 8.5 mph.

== In popular culture ==
The unique history of the Great Falls and the city were described in the five-volume philosophical poem Paterson by William Carlos Williams. Among the episodes described in Williams' poem is the 1827 leap over the falls by Sam Patch, who later became the first known person to perform a stunt at Niagara Falls. The 2016 film Paterson, directed by Jim Jarmusch, is partly inspired by the works of Williams and features the falls as a primary location.

The Great Falls were also featured in the pilot of the HBO crime drama The Sopranos, as well as in the series' sixth episode, in which Mikey Palmice and another associate throw a drug dealer off the bridge and into the falls to his death.

== See also ==
- List of waterfalls
- List of National Natural Landmarks in New Jersey
- Garret Mountain Reservation
- National Register of Historic Places listings in Passaic County, New Jersey
- Paterson Museum and Rogers Locomotive and Machine Works
- Old Great Falls Historic District
- Lambert Castle
