= Lambert Castle =

Historic house in Paterson, New Jersey, United States

- Belle Vista
- U.S. National Register of Historic Places
- New Jersey Register of Historic Places
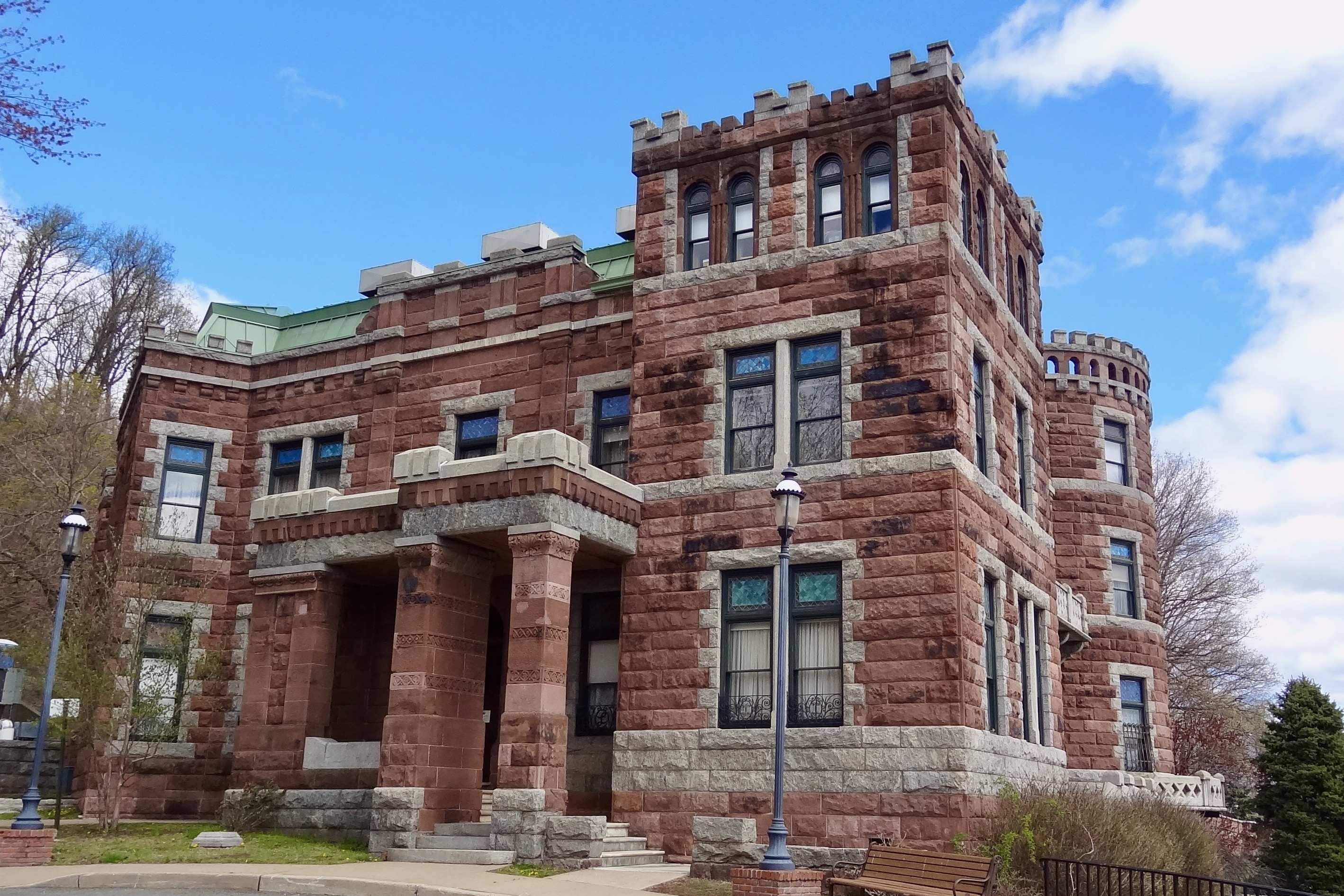
- Lambert Castle in 2014

- Location within Passaic County, New Jersey Location within New Jersey Location within the United States
- Location: Valley Road in Garret Mountain Reservation, Paterson, New Jersey
- Coordinates: 40°54′0″N 74°10′22″W
- Area: less than one acre
- Built: 1892
- NRHP reference No.: 76001180
- NJRHP No.: 2385

Significant dates
- Added to NRHP: June 3, 1976
- Designated NJRHP: November 25, 1975

Lambert Castle, originally called Belle Vista, is located within the Garret Mountain Reservation in Paterson, Passaic County, New Jersey. The building was built in 1892 and was added to the National Register of Historic Places on June 3, 1976, for its significance in art, architecture, and industry.

== History ==
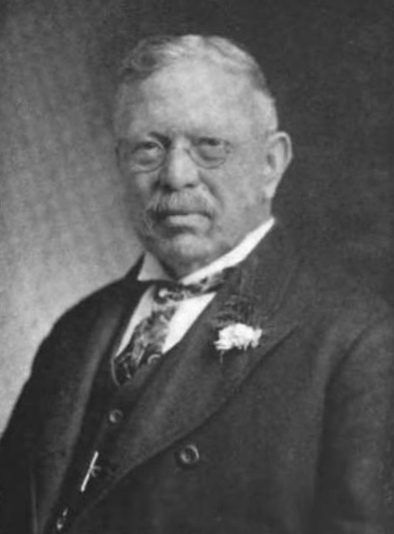
Catholina Lambert (1834–1923)

Lambert Castle was built in 1892 as the home of Catholina Lambert, the owner of a prominent silk mill in the City of Paterson. Constructed in the Medieval Revival architectural style, Lambert's dream was to build a home reminiscent of the castles in Great Britain that he remembered from his boyhood years. President William McKinley and Vice President Garret Hobart visited the castle in 1898.

In June 1910, filmmaker D. W. Griffith shot The Call To Arms on the grounds. The film was released in July 1910. The cast included Mary Pickford (in her only male role) and Henry B. Walthall. Film Preservation Society, Inc. is restoring the film as part of The Biograph Project.

After Lambert's death in 1923, his family sold the building to the City of Paterson, which in turn sold it to Passaic County a few years later. Passaic County used the building for administrative offices, and in 1936, provided one room to the fledgling Passaic County Historical Society to serve as its historical museum. As time went by the museum grew, room by room, until the entire first floor became the historical museum.

In the late 1990s, the Castle underwent a multimillion-dollar restoration and all four floors of the building were developed into a museum and library.

== Construction ==
Construction began on the castle in 1891. The castle was built on the side of the First Watchung Mountain out of sandstone and granite. The sandstone was quarried from the surrounding hills. The initial construction cost was estimated at a half a million dollars. In 1896, an art gallery was added to the castle and a 70-foot observation tower was constructed on the crest of the cliff.

The gallery wing fell into disrepair and was demolished in 1936. The observation tower was open to the public until the late 1960s when it was closed due to disrepair.

In 2014 the Garret Rock Observation tower renovations were completed and the observation tower was reopened to the public. Admission to the tower is free with panoramic views available from the top.

== Gallery ==
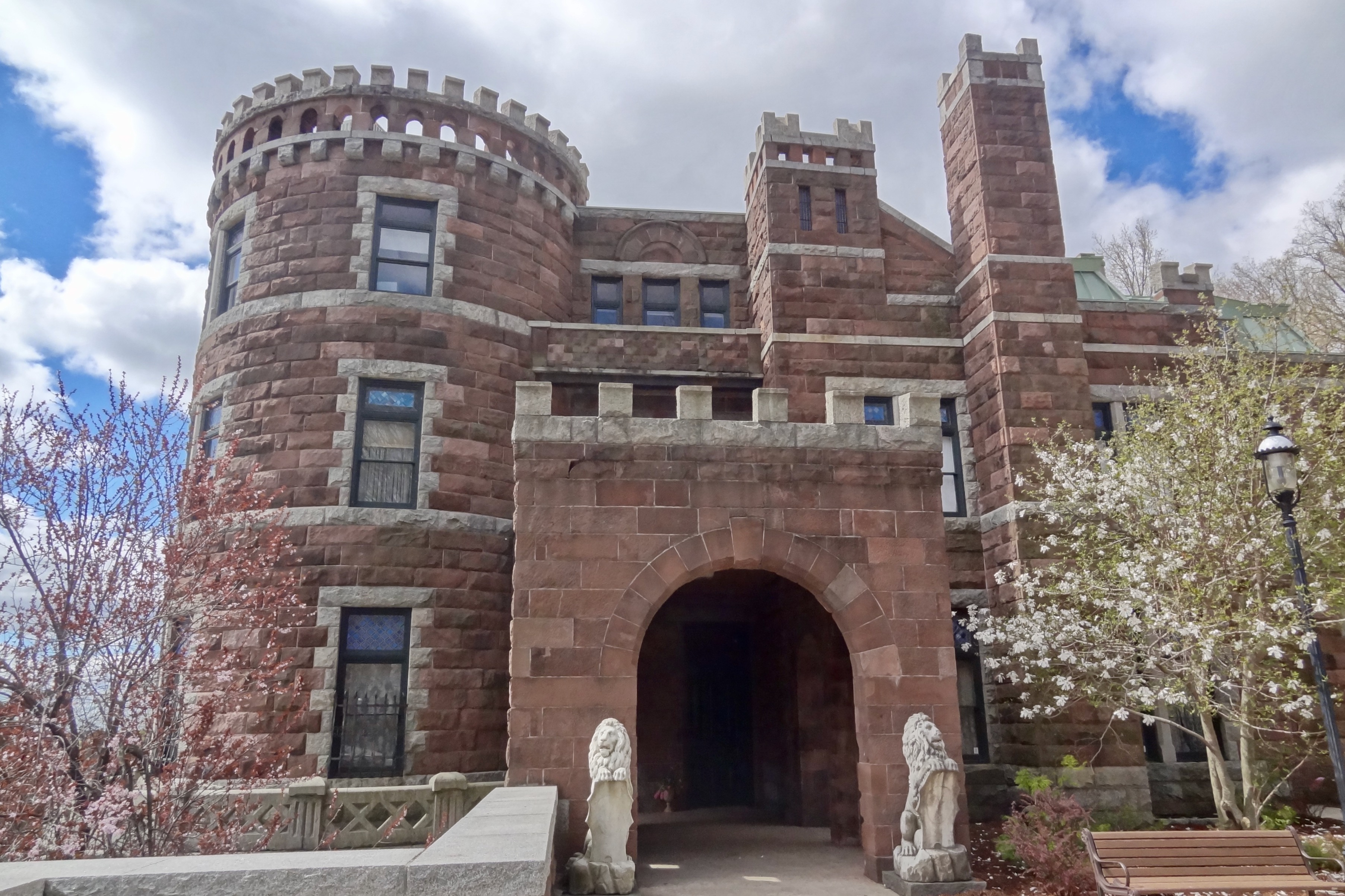
Marble lion statues by the entrance

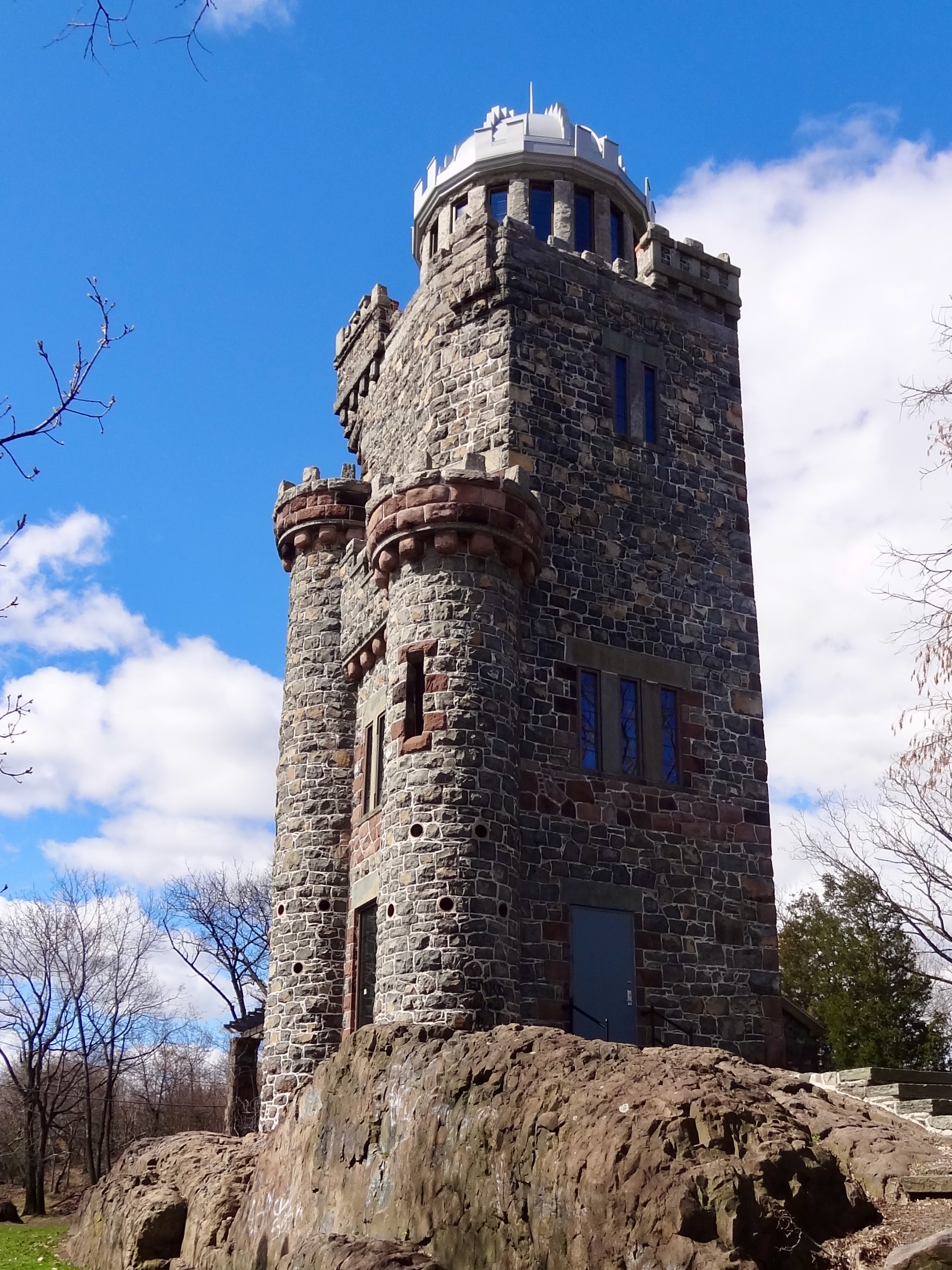
Lambert Tower on the mountain crest

== See also ==
- Great Falls (Passaic River)
- National Register of Historic Places listings in Passaic County, New Jersey
- List of museums in New Jersey
