= Woodland Park School District (New Jersey) =

School district in Passaic County, New Jersey, US

Address
- 853 McBride Avenue Woodland Park, Passaic County, New Jersey, 07424; United States
- Coordinates: 40.895743°N 74.200639°W

District information
- Grades: PreK-8
- Superintendent: Michele Pillari
- Business administrator: Aleksandar Kondovski
- Schools: 4

Students and staff
- Enrollment: 1,269 (as of 2024–25)
- Faculty: 109.8 FTEs
- Student–teacher ratio: 11.6:1

Other information
- District Factor Group: DE
- Website: District website
Ind.	Per pupil	District spending	Rank (*)	K-8 average	%± vs. average
1A	Total Spending	$15,677	17	$18,891	−17.0%
1	Budgetary Cost	12,531	19	14,159	−11.5%
2	Classroom Instruction	7,618	15	8,659	−12.0%
6	Support Services	2,046	43	2,167	−5.6%
8	Administrative Cost	1,516	37	1,547	−2.0%
10	Operations & Maintenance	1,345	26	1,612	−16.6%
16	Median Teacher Salary	61,515	47	61,136
Data from NJDoE 2014 Taxpayers' Guide to Education Spending. *Of K-8 districts with more than 750 students. Lowest spending=1; Highest=84

The Woodland Park School District is a comprehensive community public school district that serves students in pre-kindergarten through eighth grade from the Borough of Woodland Park (formerly known as West Paterson), in Passaic County, in the U.S. state of New Jersey.

As of the 2024–25 school year, the district, comprised of four schools, had an enrollment of 1,269 students and 109.8 classroom teachers (on an FTE basis), for a student–teacher ratio of 11.6:1.

The district is classified by the New Jersey Department of Education as being in District Factor Group "DE", the fifth-highest of eight groupings. District Factor Groups organize districts statewide to allow comparison by common socioeconomic characteristics of the local districts. From lowest socioeconomic status to highest, the categories are A, B, CD, DE, FG, GH, I and J.

For ninth through twelfth grades, public school students attend Passaic Valley Regional High School, which also serves students from Little Falls and Totowa. The school facility is located in Little Falls. As of the 2024–25 school year, the high school had an enrollment of 1,093 students and 82.4 classroom teachers (on an FTE basis), for a student–teacher ratio of 13.3:1.

== Schools ==
Schools in the district (with 2024–25 enrollment data from the National Center for Education Statistics) are:

Preschool

- School One with 122 students in grade PreK
  - Elis Francisco, principal

Elementary schools

- Charles Olbon School with 404 students in grades PreK–2
  - Stephen Scholtz, principal
- Beatrice Gilmore School with 359 students in grades 3–5
  - Jessica Mastropaolo, principal

Middle school

- Memorial Middle School with 374 students in grades 6–8
  - Robert Correggio, principal

== Administration ==
Members of the district's administration are:

- Michele Pillari, superintendent
- Aleksandar Kondovski, business administrator and board secretary

== Board of education ==
The district's board of education, comprised of nine members, sets policy and oversees the fiscal and educational operation of the district through its administration. As a Type II school district, the board's trustees are elected directly by voters to serve three-year terms of office on a staggered basis, with three seats up for election each year held (since 2012) as part of the November general election. The board appoints a superintendent to oversee the district's day-to-day operations and a business administrator to supervise the business functions of the district.
