= Garret Mountain Reservation =

Public park in Passaic County, New Jersey

- IUCN category V (protected landscape/seascape)
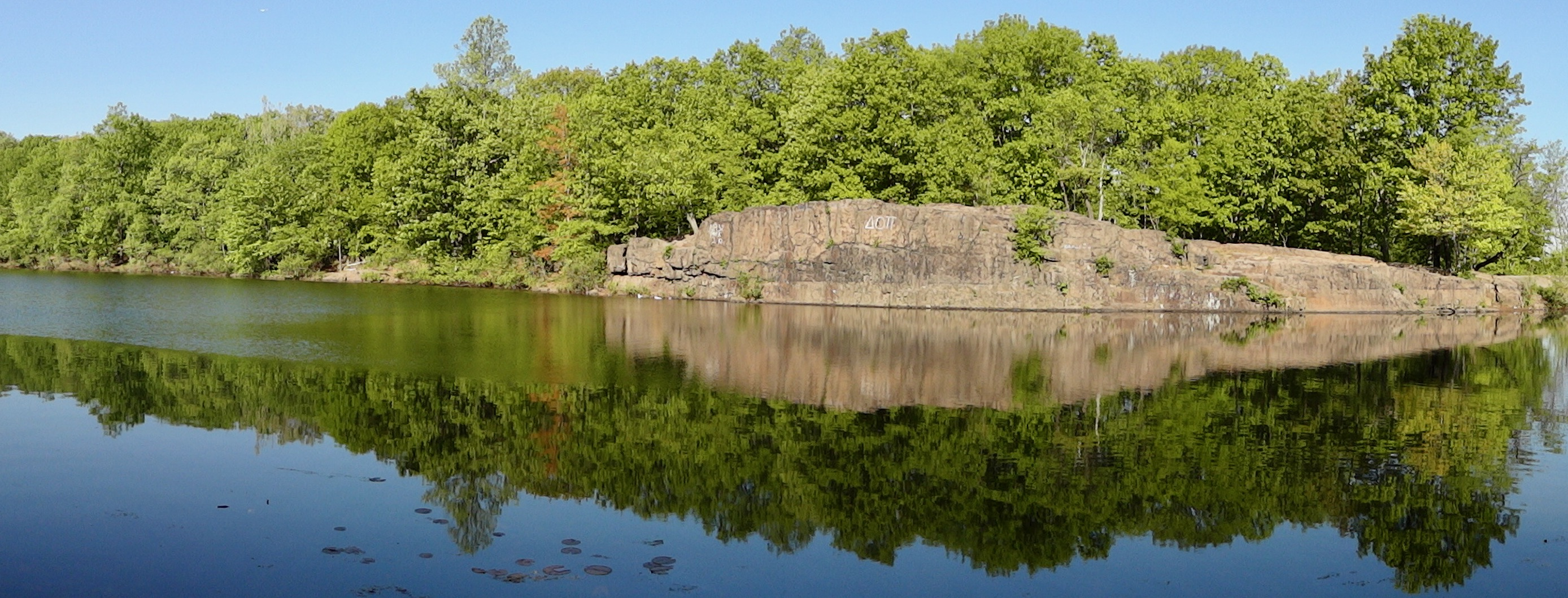
- Barbour Pond

- Location within Passaic County, New Jersey
- Location: Paterson and Woodland Park, New Jersey
- Coordinates: 40°54′02″N 74°10′40″W
- Area: 568 acres (2.30 km^{2})
- Governing body: Passaic County, New Jersey

U.S. National Natural Landmark
- Designated: 1967

Garret Mountain Reservation (also spelled Garrett) is a 568-acre (230 ha) park located on First Watchung Mountain (Garret Mountain) in Paterson and Woodland Park (formerly West Paterson) in southern Passaic County, New Jersey. In 1967, it was designated a National Natural Landmark as part of the Great Falls of Paterson-Garret Mountain listing. The park extends into Clifton. Garret Mountain is Passaic County's major recreational area, providing the visitors with grass fields, several miles of walking/running trails, basketball courts, picnic areas, Barbour's Pond is state stocked with fish for anglers, as well as an Equestrian Center with horseback riding lessons.

The Passaic County Parks Department operates the park while the Passaic County Sheriff is responsible for law enforcement in the reservation. For the past several decades, the reservation has been the site of hundreds of high school and college cross country meets in the fall, including the New Jersey State Interscholastic Athletic Association (NJSIAA) High School State Sectional Championships at the end of every October.

== Etymology ==
There are two theories about the origin of the name Garret. One references the Garret Society, founded in Newark in 1810, which met in local garrets. In 1834, the group visited Paterson and met on what was then known as Weasel Mountain. In 1861, a local map named the mountain as Garret's Rock. The second references Garret Pier, who owned property here.

== History ==
Lambert Castle, located on the eastern slope of the First Watchung Mountain, just off Route 19, is a 19th-century castle which has been recently renovated and now hosts the Passaic County Museum (open to the public). It was built in 1892 by Catholina Lambert and was added to the National Register of Historic Places in 1976 for its significance in art, architecture, and industry. Lambert Tower, on the crest of the mountain, overlooks the area.

The Morris Canal once passed 0.2 miles (300 m) east of the castle. Up until 1962, the right-of-way now occupied by I-80 and Route 19 around Garrett Mountain was part of the Boonton Line of the Lackawanna Railroad.

== Fauna ==
Since the park is an oasis of woodland surrounded by urbanity, Garret Mountain is a stopover point for migrating song birds, including 35 species of warblers, numerous vireos, orioles, sparrows and thrushes. Birdwatchers from the tri-state areas flock to this hotspot for great views of over 150 species per year along the easily accessible trails.

== Gallery ==
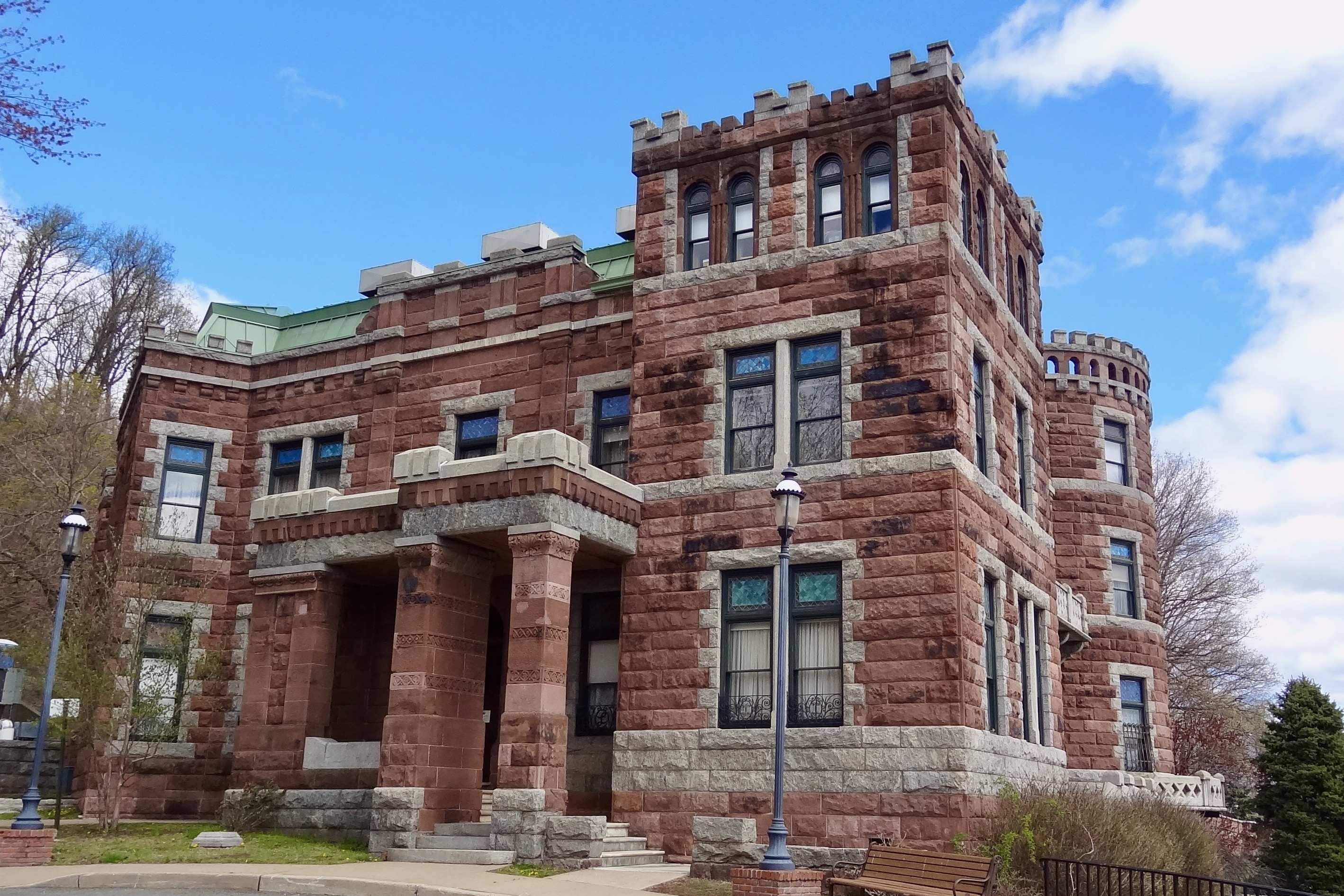
Lambert Castle

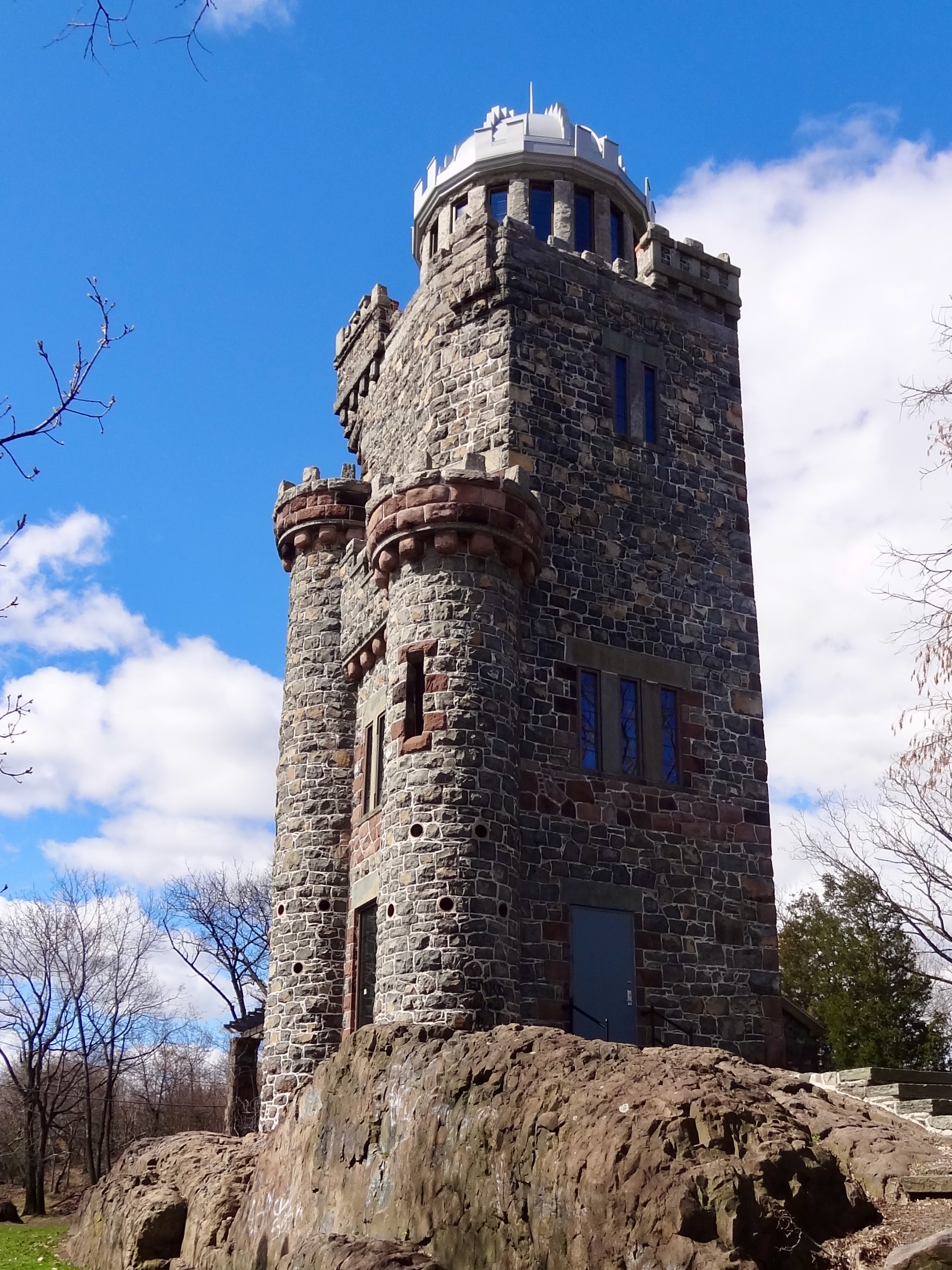
Lambert Tower on basalt outcrop

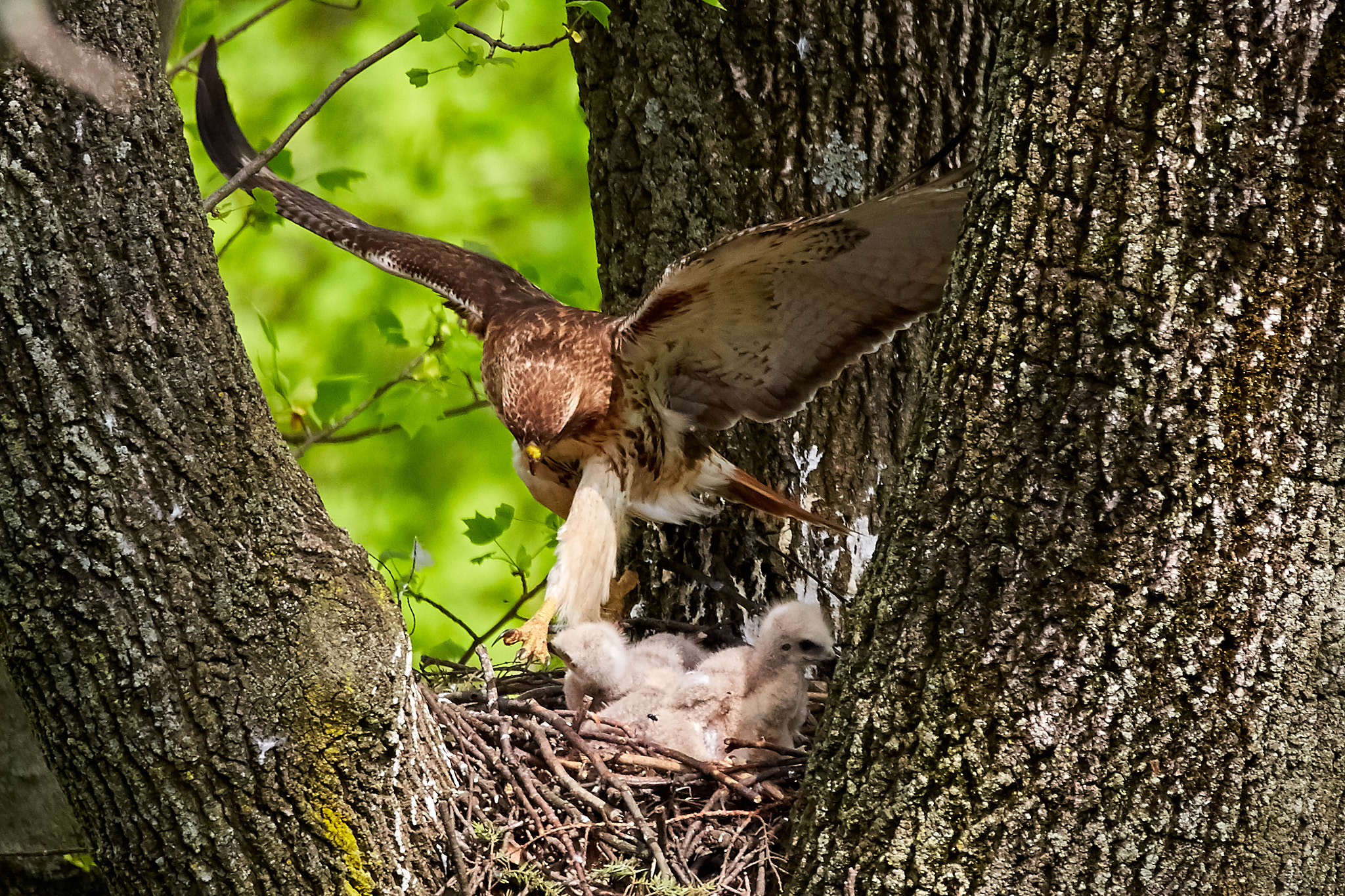
Red-tailed hawk in nest

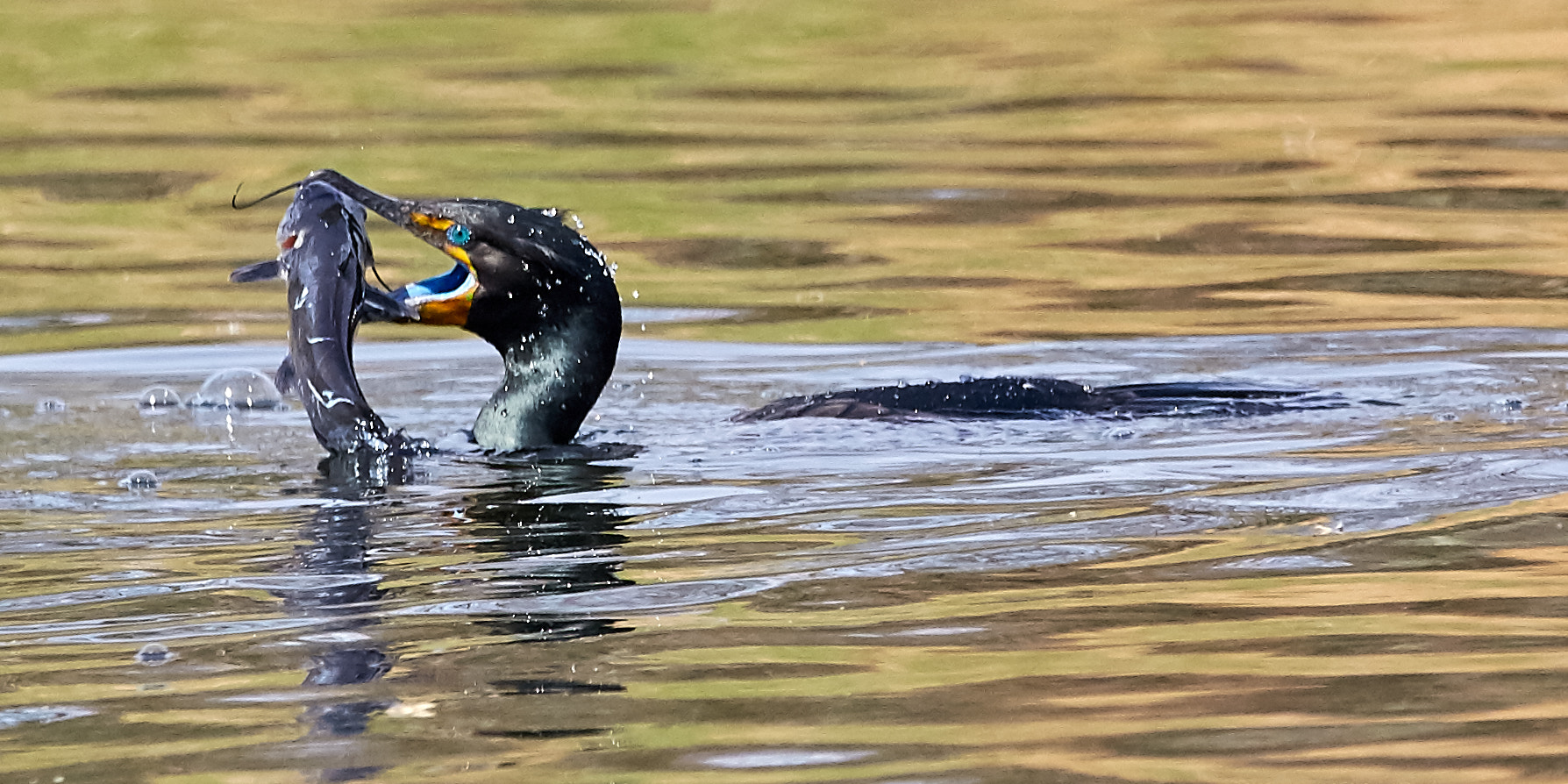
Cormorant with fish

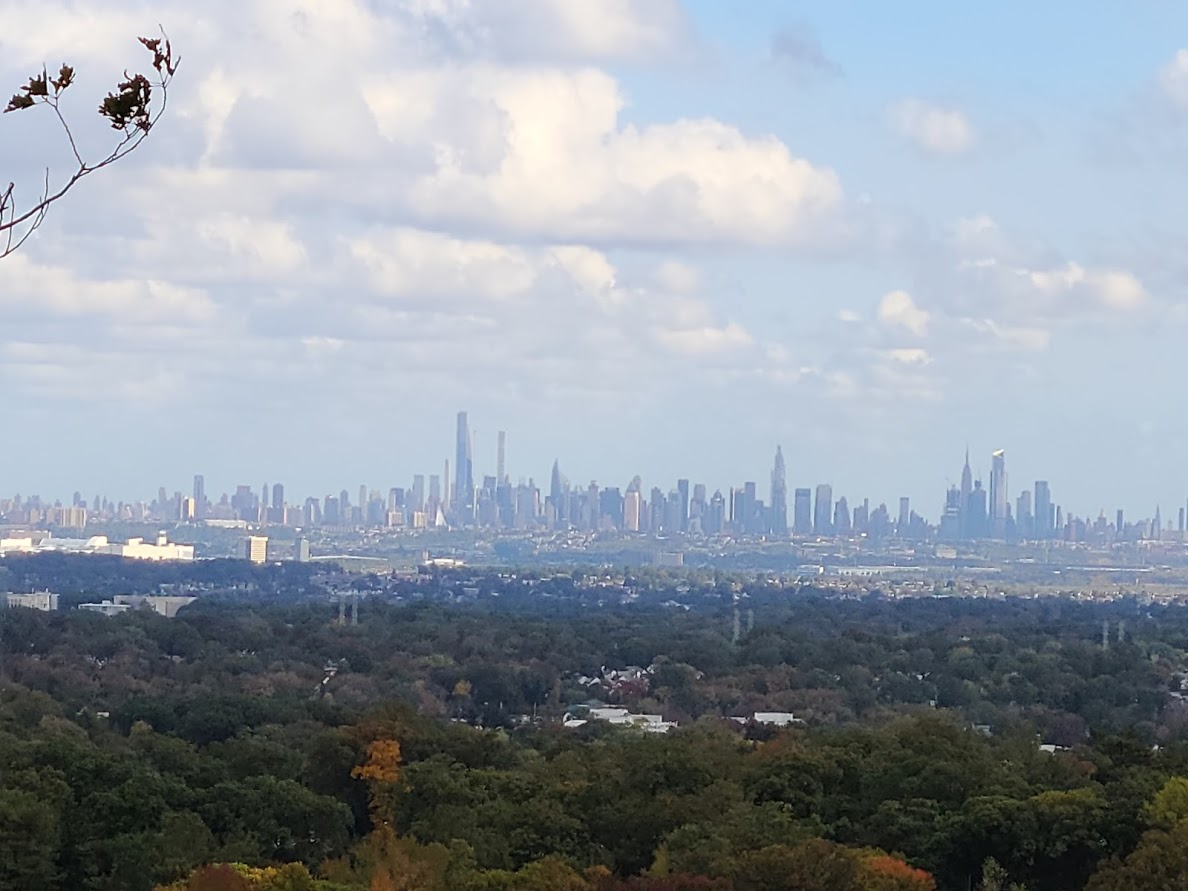
View of NYC from trail on Garret Mountain

== See also ==
- List of National Natural Landmarks in New Jersey
- Rifle Camp Park
- 1880 Garret Rock May Day riot
