= Barnert =

Barnert may refer to:

- Nathan Barnert
- The Barnert Hospital (or the Barnert Medical Arts Complex on the grounds of the former hospital)
- The Miriam Barnert Hebrew Free School
- The Barnert Temple in Franklin Lakes, NJ
