= Cedar Lawn Cemetery =

Historic rural cemetery in Paterson, New Jersey

Coordinates: 40.89546°N 74.13674°W

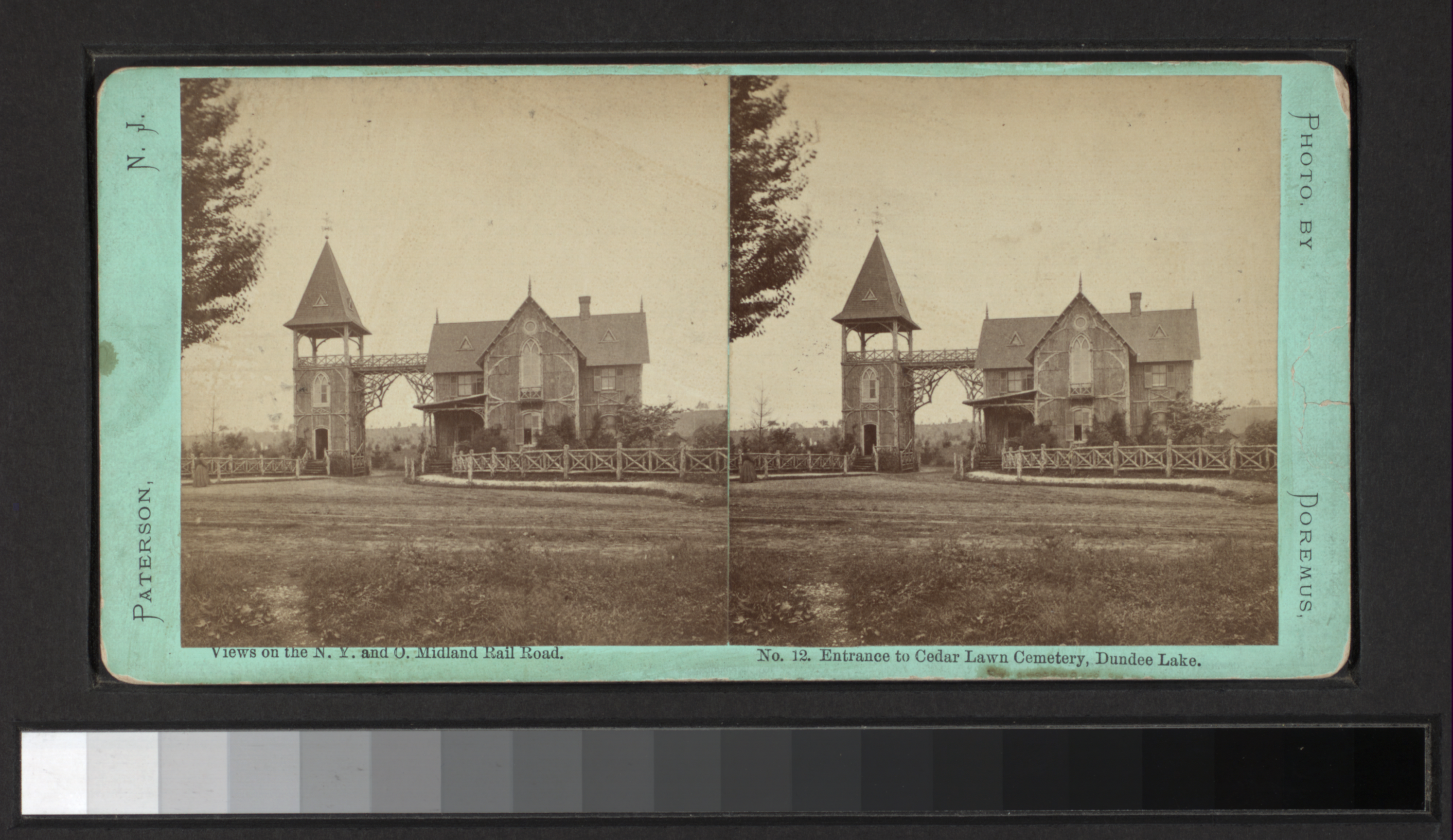
Stereoscopic Photo of the Entrance to Cedar Lawn Cemetery

Cedar Lawn Cemetery is a Victorian rural cemetery in Paterson, New Jersey. Cedar Lawn Cemetery officially opened in September 1867, and recorded its first burial on September 27, 1867.

== Location ==
Cedar Lawn is located on a multi-acre plot bordered by Lakeview Avenue (CR 624), Crooks Avenue, I-80, and NJ-20; the plot is also home to the adjacent Calvary Cemetery, a Roman Catholic burial ground. Over 85,000 people are interred at Cedar Lawn.

== History ==
During the Revolutionary War, the cemetery was farmland, owned by Annatje Von Riper, her son Henry Doremus, and Hessel Peterse. The British army plundered the three households on its march through New Jersey in November 1776.

== Noted interments ==
- John Bancker Aycrigg (1798–1856), represented New Jersey in the United States House of Representatives (1837–1839 and 1841–1843).
- William Warren Barbour (1888–1943), U.S. Senator from New Jersey and amateur Heavyweight boxing champion.
- Charles Dyer Beckwith (1838–1921), American Republican Party politician from New Jersey who represented New Jersey's 5th congressional district (1889–1891).
- Nicholas M. Butler (1862–1947), co-winner with Jane Addams of the 1931 Nobel Peace Prize. President of Columbia University (1902–1945) and of the Carnegie Endowment for International Peace (1925–1945). Republican Party nominee for Vice President of the United States under President William Howard Taft in 1912, when the nominated vice presidential candidate James S. Sherman died in office a few days before the election.
- Cornelius A. Cadmus (1844–1902), represented New Jersey's 5th congressional district (1891–1895).
- Philemon Dickerson (1788–1862), United States congressman and 12th Governor of New Jersey (1836–1837).
- Dow H. Drukker (1872–1963), represented New Jersey's 6th congressional district (1914–19).
- John W. Griggs (1849–1927), 29th Governor of New Jersey (1896–1898). U.S. Attorney General (1898–1901).
- Abraham Godwin (1763–1835), Fife Major American Revolution
- Abraham Godwin Jr (1792–1849), first Lieutenant of the expedition to Canada in 1812 led by Generals Brown and Izard
- Garret Hobart (1844–1899), 24th Vice President of the United States.
- Jennie Tuttle Hobart (1849–1941), wife of the former U.S. vice president.
- Samuel Holt (1811–1887), a British weaver, inventor and industrialist who emigrated to Paterson.
- Ted Horn (1910–1948), American race car driver who won the AAA National Championship in 1946, 1947, 1948.
- William Hughes (1872–1918), politician who represented New Jersey in both houses of the United States Congress.
- Charles Joughin (1878–1956), Chief baker aboard the ill-fated ocean liner RMS Titanic. Known as the last survivor to leave the sinking ship and surviving for nearly two hours in the freezing waters.
- Eugene W. Leake (1876–1959), represented New Jersey's 9th congressional district (1907–09).
- Amos H. Radcliffe (1870–1950), Mayor of Paterson, New Jersey (1916–1919), and represented New Jersey's 7th congressional district (1919–1923).
- Julian Rix (1850–1903), American landscape artist.
- John Ryle (1817–1887), Industrialist and prominent silk manufacturer who pioneered the textile and is frequently referred to as the "Father of the U.S. Silk Industry", who also served as Mayor of Paterson, New Jersey (1869–1870). Ryle was also the Founder and First President of the Passaic Water Company, later the Passaic Valley Water Commission.
- Mary Danforth Ryle (1833–1904), Philanthropist who donated millions to Paterson and other New Jersey historical and cultural institutions.
- William Ryle (1834–1881), Industrialist who was reputed to be the world's largest importer of European silk in the United States in the late 19th century. William Ryle married Mary Danforth, who later donated millions to various Paterson and New Jersey institutions and charities. William Ryle was the nephew of John Ryle, widely regarded as the "Father of the U.S. Silk Industry."
- James F. Stewart (1851–1904), represented New Jersey's 5th congressional district in the United States House of Representatives (1895–1903).
- There is one Commonwealth war grave of a Royal Canadian Air Force airman of World War II.

== See also ==
- List of burial places of presidents and vice presidents of the United States
