= Andrew F. McBride =

American physician

Mayor of Paterson, New Jersey
- In office 1908–1913

Personal details
- Born: Andrew Francis McBride; January 4, 1869 Paterson, New Jersey, U.S.
- Died: 1946 (aged 76–77)

Andrew Francis McBride (4 January 1869 - 1946) was a physician and Mayor of Paterson, New Jersey from 1908 to 1913. There is a statue of him alongside those of Alexander Hamilton, Garret Hobart and Nathan Barnert, outside of Paterson City Hall. He was elected as a Democrat. He was New Jersey Labor Commissioner.

He was born on 4 January 1869 in Paterson, New Jersey to Hugh McBride of Ireland.
