= Passaic County Court House =

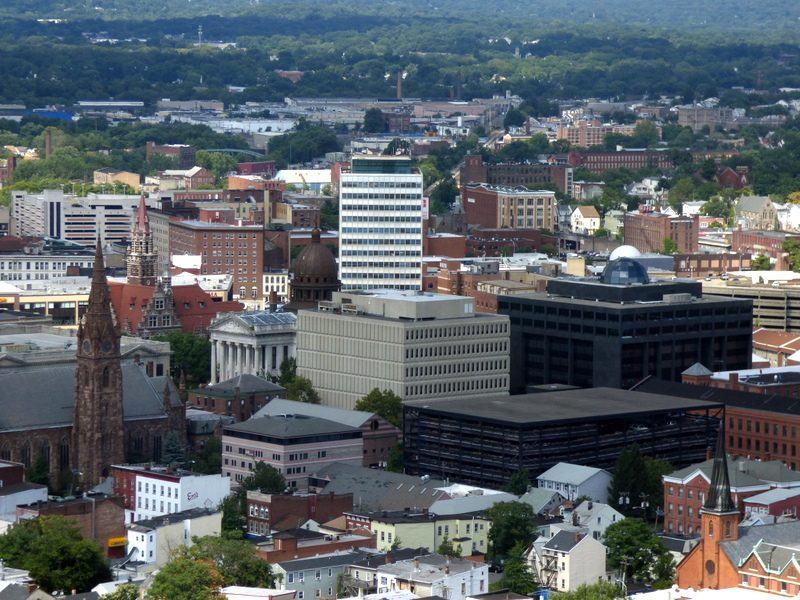
The Court House and Administrative Building complex (center) for Passaic County is located in Downtown Paterson.

The Passaic County Court House complex is located at the seat of Passaic County, New Jersey in Paterson.

== Old Passaic County Courthouse and Annex ==
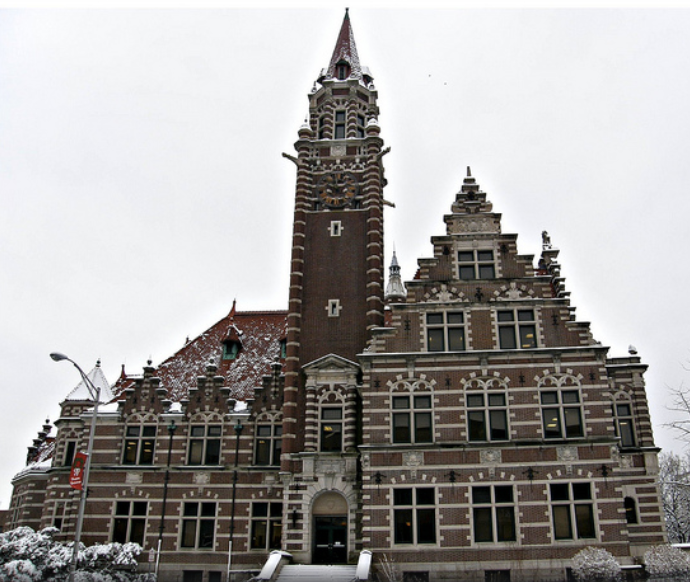
Original US Post Office and Courthouse Annex

- Passaic County Court House and United States Custom House and Post Office Historic District
- U.S. National Register of Historic Places
- U.S. Historic district
- New Jersey Register of Historic Places
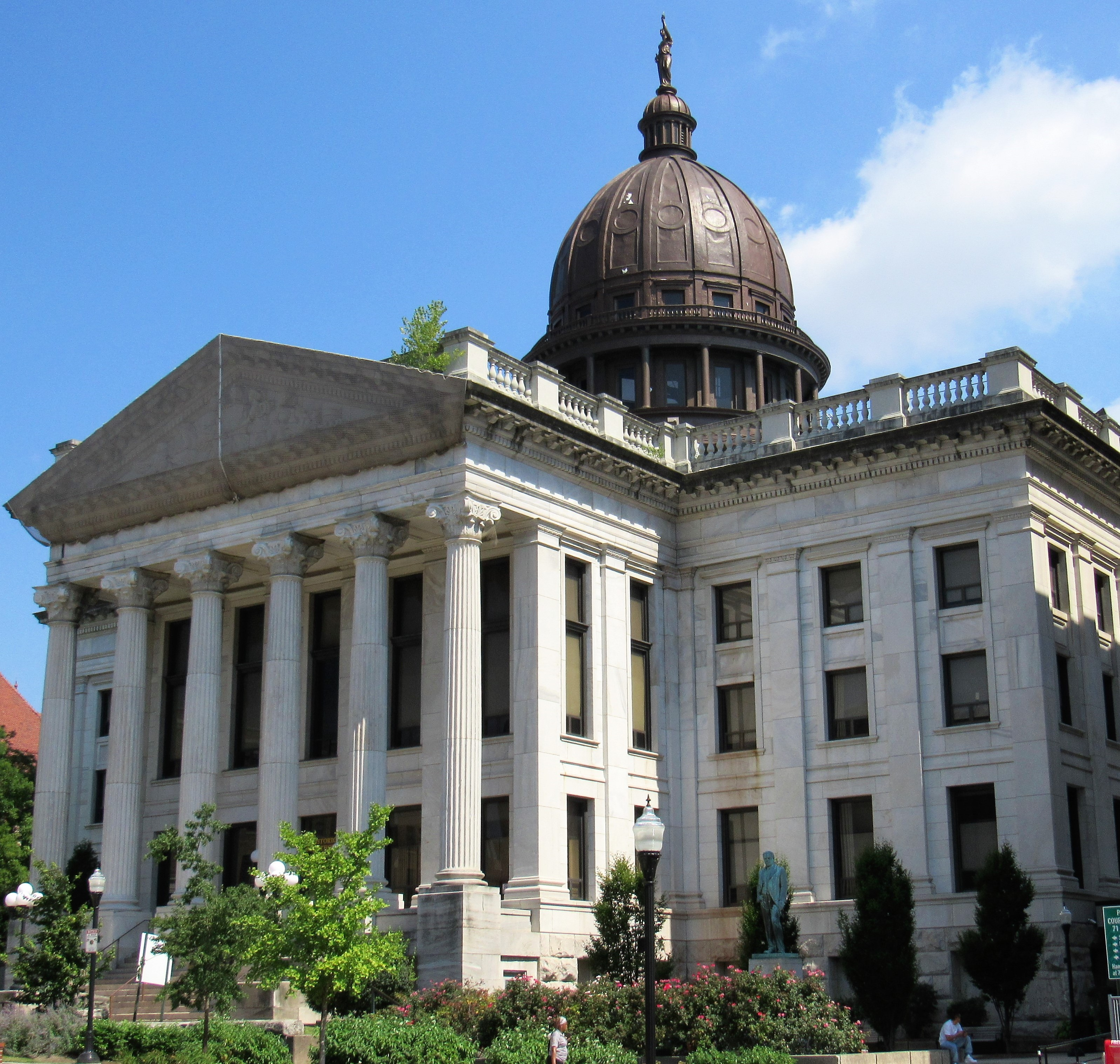

- Location within Passaic County, New Jersey Location within New Jersey Location within the United States
- Location: 73-87, 63-65 Hamilton Street; Paterson, NJ 07505
- Coordinates: 40°54′50″N 74°10′16″W
- Architectural style: Beaux Arts, Renaissance Revival
- NRHP reference No.: 15000443
- NJRHP No.: 5441

Significant dates
- Added to NRHP: July 21, 2015
- Designated NJRHP: May 28, 2015

The Old Passaic County Court House and Annex are located at 71 and 63-65 Hamilton Street, respectively. The Passaic County Court House was constructed between 1898 and 1903. It was designed by architect Samuel Burrage Reed and is an excellent example of Classical Revival architecture. The Court House Annex was constructed in 1899 as the United States Post Office following a design of architect Fred Wesley Wentworth in the Dutch Baroque Revival style. The county acquired the building in 1936 and the building was re-dedicated as the Passaic County Administration Building and annexed to the adjacent county court house.

In October 2012, the buildings were determined to be eligible for the state and federal registers of historic places. The New Jersey State historic preservation office made a grant of $20,000 to prepare nominations for listing. The main entrance of the old courthouse which had fallen into disrepair was restored, reopening in 2014. They were listed in 2015.

== Passaic County Court House and Administration Building ==
The Passaic County Court House is located at 77 Hamilton Street, was constructed in 1968. to house the courts and administration of the county The new adjacent Passaic County Administration Building, built in 1994, is located at 401 Grand Street.

== See also ==
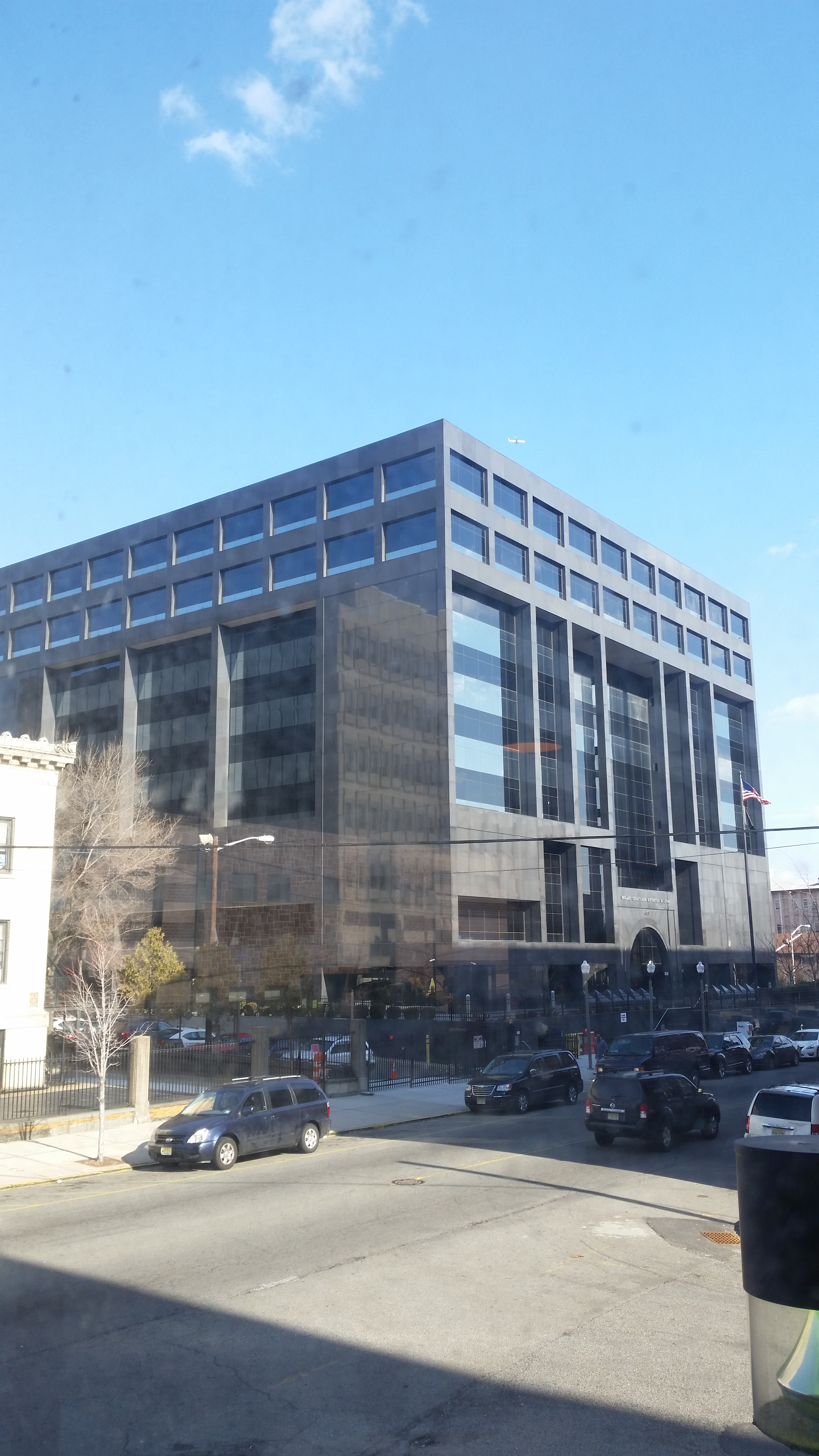
Passaic County Administration Building

- List of tallest buildings in Paterson
- Paterson City Hall
- List of United States federal courthouses in New Jersey
- County courthouses in New Jersey
- Richard J. Hughes Justice Complex
- List of New Jersey county seats
- National Register of Historic Places listings in Passaic County, New Jersey
