= Downtown Paterson =

Commercial district in Passaic County, New Jersey, US

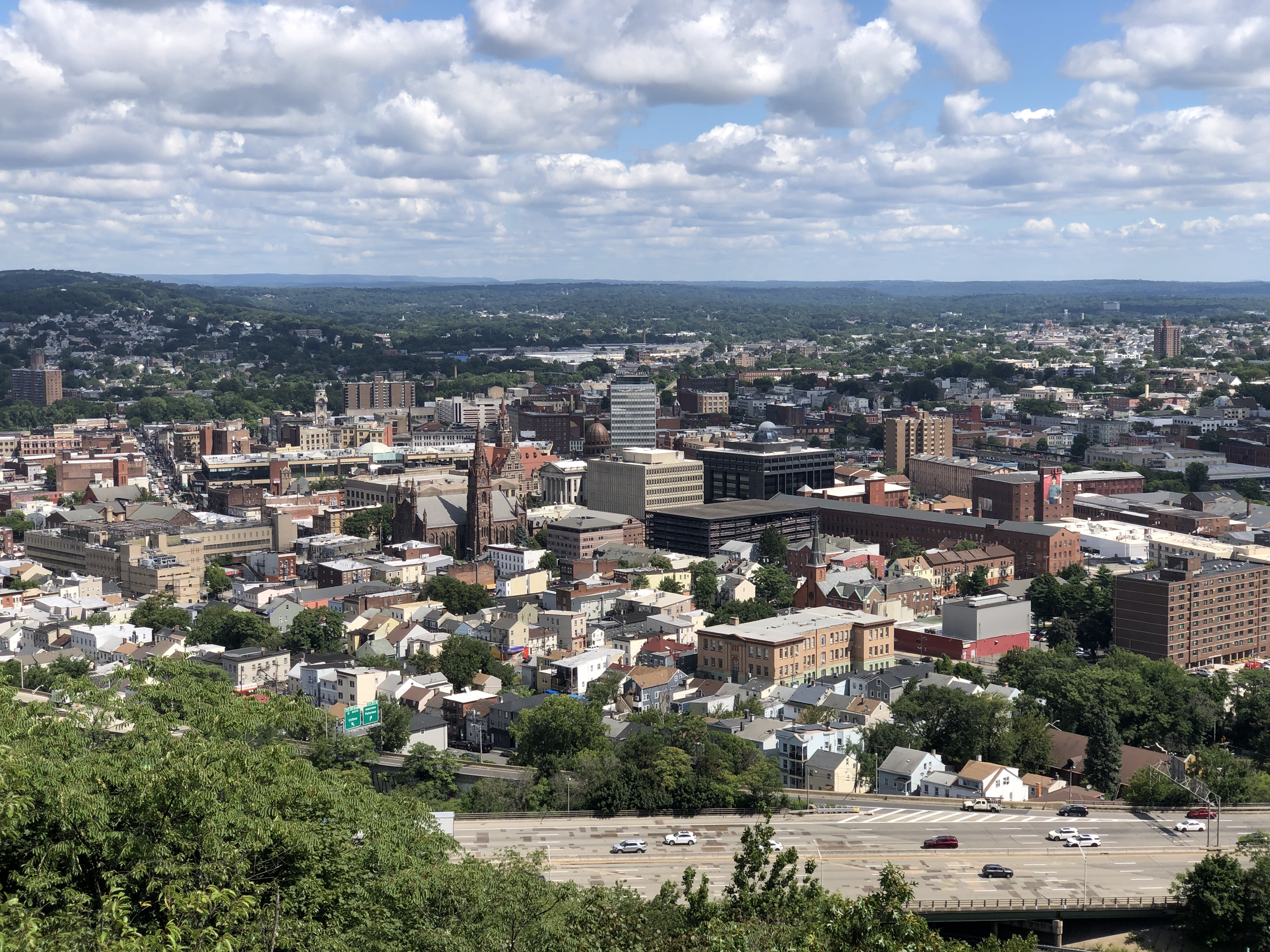
Downtown Paterson, New Jersey

Downtown Paterson is the main commercial district of Paterson, Passaic County, in the U.S. state of New Jersey. The area is the oldest part of the city, along the banks of the Passaic River and its Great Falls. It is roughly bounded by Interstate 80, Garret Mountain Reservation, Route 19, Oliver Street, and Spruce Street on the south; the Passaic River, West Broadway, Cliff Street, North 3rd Street, Haledon Avenue, and the borough of Prospect Park on the west; and the Passaic River also to the north.

== Overview ==
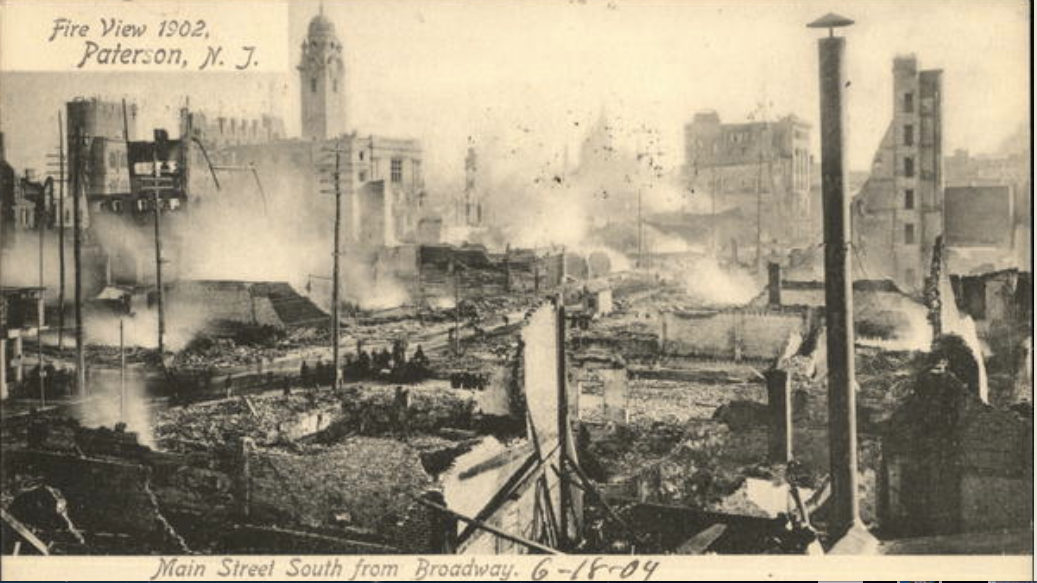

After a devastating fire in 1902, the city rebuilt the downtown with massive Beaux-Arts-style buildings, many of which remain to this day. and are contributing properties to the Downtown Commercial Historic District. These buildings are usually four to seven stories tall. Downtown Paterson is home to City Hall and the Passaic County Court House, two of the city's architectural landmarks. City Hall was designed by the New York firm Carrere and Hastings in 1894 and is modeled after the Hôtel de Ville (city hall) in Lyon, France, capital of the silk industry in Europe. Downtown abounds with buildings designed by Fred Wesley Wentworth, some in collaboration with his draftsman and later partner Frederick J. Vreeland, who worked in the city from the turn of the century to the 1930s. The Cathedral of St. John the Baptist survived the fire. As the county seat Paterson is home to the Passaic County Court House complex, Passaic County Community College, and several federal and state offices. Center City Mall is a 320,000-square-foot (30,000 m^{2}) shopping mall at 301 Main Street opened in 2009. The massive Masjid Jalalabad mosque, which can accommodate 1,500 worshippers, is located on Van Houten Street. Paterson Broadway Bus Terminal is a major regional bus terminal. Downtown has a diverse ethnic makeup with large Dominican, Puerto Rican, Peruvian, and Mexican populations. Little Lima is the largest Peruvian American enclave in the United States.

== Historic district ==
- Paterson Downtown Commercial Historic District
- U.S. National Register of Historic Places
- U.S. Historic district
- New Jersey Register of Historic Places
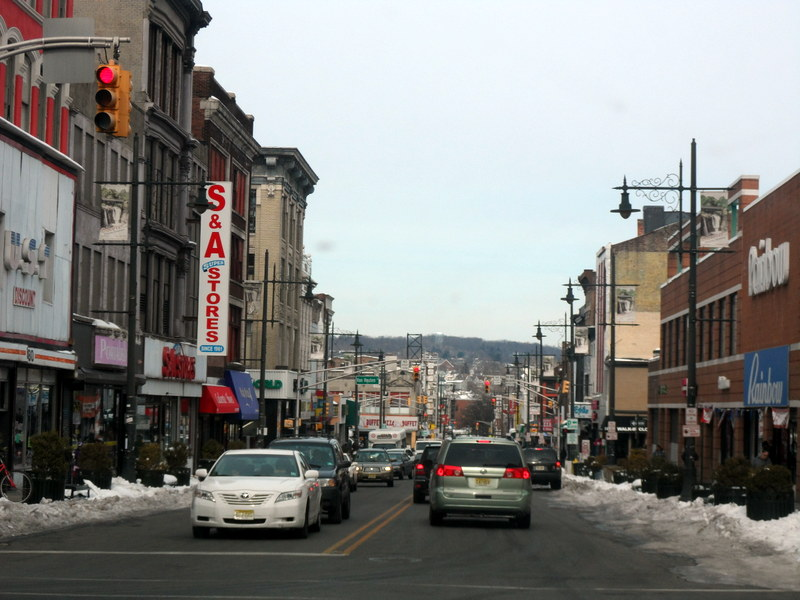
- Main Street in Paterson

- Location within Passaic County, New Jersey Location within New Jersey Location within the United States
- Location: Parts of Main, Market, Ellison, Van Houten, Broadway, West Broadway, Fair, Prospect, Cianci, Church, Colt, Washington and Hamilton streets
- Coordinates: 40°55′2″N 74°10′21″W
- Area: 41 acres (17 ha)
- Built: 1851
- Architect: John Merven Carrère, Thomas Hastings
- Architectural style: Beaux Arts, Romanesque
- NRHP reference No.: 99000192
- NJRHP No.: 170

Significant dates
- Added to NRHP: February 12, 1999
- Designated NJRHP: December 15, 1998

The Paterson Downtown Commercial Historic District is a 41-acre (17 ha) historic district containing parts of Main, Market, Ellison, Van Houten, Broadway, West Broadway, Fair, Prospect, Cianci, Church, Colt, Washington and Hamilton streets in downtown Paterson. It was added to the National Register of Historic Places on February 12, 1999 for its significance in architecture, commerce, and community planning and development. The district includes 210 contributing buildings and one contributing object. It includes the Paterson City Hall, which was added individually to the NRHP in 1995. The Paterson Great Falls National Historical Park and Public School Number Two are located nearby.

== Tallest commercial buildings ==
Rank	Name	Address	image	Height ft/m	Floors	Year	Notes
1	Alexander Hamilton Plaza	100 Hamilton Plaza		176 ft (54 m)	14	1973	named for Alexander Hamilton
	The Hamiltonian; Medical Missions for Children	703 Main Street		169 ft (52 m)	14	2014 construction start 2016 projected completion	DoubleTree
2	Cathedral of St. John the Baptist	381 Grand Street			spire	1868	by Patrick Keely
3	Paterson City Hall	155 Market Street		164 ft (50 m)	tower	1896	by Carrère and Hastings
	St. Joseph's Regional Medical Center	703 Main Street		130 ft (40 m)	9	1928	
	Passaic County Court House Annex	Hamilton Street			spire	1898	by F.W. Wentworth
	Old Passaic County Court House	71 Hamilton Street			dome and statue	1898	by Samuel B. Reed
	YMCA Building	128 Ward Street		109 ft (33 m)	9	1929	by F.W. Wentworth
	Passaic County Administration Building	401 Grand Street		109 ft (33 m)	9	1994	
	Fabian Building	31-51 Church Street		97 ft (30 m)	9	1925	for Jacob Fabian by F.W. Wentworth
	Alexander Hamilton Hotel	39-55 Church Street		97 ft (30 m)	8	1925	by F.W. Wentworth
	Center City Mall	301 Main Street		85 ft (26 m)	5	2009	
	Passaic County Court House	77 Hamilton Street		85 ft (26 m)	7	1968	
	Robert A. Roe Federal Building	200 Federal Plaza		73 ft (22 m)	6		for Robert A. Roe

== CBD, SID, and UEZ ==
The central business district of Paterson is the area closest to the Passaic River on the west side of the city. The areas along Market Street and Main Street are some of the busiest and largest commercial districts in Paterson. Downtown was once a shopping mecca for northern New Jersey. As with many other older urban cores in the United States, it suffered as shoppers and retailers moved to the suburban shopping malls of the region. For a large part, Downtown retailers are "mom and pop" retailers who employ local residents. In 1997, a special improvement district (SID) created by Merchants and Businesses of Downtown Paterson, comprising over 300 stakeholders, updated storefronts and beautified city streets with signage and lighting. Downtown SID employees supplement the municipal cleaning, informational, and safety services of the city by maintaining a "Clean and Safe" staff. The association participates in many city activities with sponsorships such as the Great Falls Festival and the annual 4th of July fireworks show, one of Northern New Jersey's largest. Additionally, the SID implements several events throughout the year in Downtown Paterson. Downtown Paterson was an Urban Enterprise Zone (UEZ), which means that participating stores sell merchandise at 3.5% sales tax, instead of the normal 7% sales tax. The UEZ also invested greatly in Downtown Paterson and the entire stretch of Main Street, with a beautification project. New street furniture such as benches, garbage cans, newspaper kiosks, bus shelters, clocks, bike racks have been installed.

== Dublin Area ==
Dublin, considered the first neighborhood of Paterson, was built up around the mills near Great Falls. The area, which is responsible for the early growth of Paterson, has a rich history and has had a diverse and changing ethnic makeup. Originally settled by Irish immigrants, the neighborhood has seen waves of English, Italians and more recently Hispanic immigrants. The Dublin area today incorporates parts of Old Great Falls Historic District and the area on Market Street, which has a large Peruvian and Argentine population today.

== Wrigley Park ==
Wrigley Park is the northern section of downtown, north of Broadway and to the east of the Passaic River. Wrigley Park is a predominantly African-American community and is mostly residential. The area is considered to be one of the more dangerous sections of Paterson along with areas of the Northside, although the crime rate has declined gradually in recent years.

== The Northside ==
Northside is a mostly residential neighborhood on the north bank of the Passaic River. The neighborhood stretches back to Paterson's borders with Haledon and Prospect Park. The neighborhoods on this side of the river are up a steep hill that gives many of the houses and streets in the Northside great views of Manhattan.

== Transportation ==
Train service began with the Paterson and Hudson River Railroad in 1833. Erie Railroad ran service on its Newark Branch and Main Line. The Paterson rail station is located in Downtown. Paterson is served by New Jersey Transit on the Main Line and limited service on the Port Jervis Line.

The Broadway Bus Terminal is the point of origin for numerous New Jersey Transit Bus Operations' local and Manhattan-bound bus lines.

Interstate 80 passes south of Downtown. New Jersey Route 19, known as the Paterson Peripheral, connects Interstate 80 and the Garden State Parkway to Downtown where it becomes Ward Street.

== See also ==
- Paterson Armory
