= C&G =

C&G may refer to:

- Casque and Gauntlet, a senior society at Dartmouth College
- City and Guilds of London Institute, an examining and accreditation body
- Cheltenham & Gloucester, a commercial bank in England
- Columbus and Greenville Railway
- Cow & Gate, a manufacturer of baby food and formula milk
