= Max Raisin =

Belarusian-born American rabbi

Max Raisin (July 15, 1881 – March 8, 1957) was a Belarusian-born American rabbi.

== Life ==
Raisin was born on July 15, 1881, in Nesvizh, Minsk Governorate, Russian Empire, the son of Aaron Solomon Raisin and Taube Slutzky. His brother was Rabbi Jacob S. Raisin.

Raisin's family emigrated to the United States in 1892. In 1903, he received an A.B. from the University of Cincinnati and was ordained a rabbi by Hebrew Union College. He also did post-grad studies at the University of California and Columbia University. He was elected rabbi of Congregation B'nai Abraham of Portsmouth, Ohio in 1901, while he was still a student at Hebrew Union College. By 1903, he wrote A History of the Jews of America in Hebrew and contributed to Hebrew periodicals in Russia and Germany. In 1903, he was elected rabbi of Congregation Ryhim Ahoovim in Stockton, California. In 1904, he became rabbi of Temple Sinai in St. Francisville, Louisiana. In 1905, he became rabbi of the new Congregation Israel in Philadelphia, Pennsylvania, the first Reform congregation in South Philadelphia. Later that year, he resigned from the congregation and was unanimously elected rabbi of Congregation Beth Israel in Meridian, Mississippi.

In 1912, Raisin received an honorary Doctor of Laws degree from the University of Mississippi, the first Mississippi rabbi to be so honored. He fought with some success to wipe out child labor in Mississippi. In 1913, he became rabbi of Shaari Zedek Synagogue in Brooklyn, New York. In 1918, he resigned from Shaari Zedek to become rabbi of a new congregation called the Brooklyn Synagogue, the first Jewish congregation in Bedford. In 1921, Raisin became rabbi of the Barnert Memorial Temple in Paterson, New Jersey. He retired as rabbi emeritus of the Temple in 1946.

In 1941, Raisin was elected to a two-year term president of the Association of Reform Rabbis of New York City and Vicinity. He collaborated with his mentor Ahad Ha'am on Ha-Shiloaḥ, and from 1916 to 1918 he was editor of The American Jewish Chronicle. He wrote, among other publications, The Jew and His Place in the World in 1913, Djohn Milton, Haish, Hameshorer, Hanabi (John Milton, the Man, the Poet, the Prophet) and Yisrael Beamerika (Israel in America) in 1924, Mordecai Manuel Noah: Zionist, Author, and Statesman in 1905, and A History of the Jews in Modern Times (which was a supplement to Heinrich Graetz's History of the Jews) in 1919. He also published autobiographical works, including Dappim mi-Pinkaso shel Rabbi in 1941, Out of My Life in 1956, and Great Jews I have Known in 1959. He prolifically wrote in Hebrew, Yiddish, and English on contemporary issues, the history of Reform Judaism, and Hebrew literature. He was also an ardent Zionist when it was unpopular in the Reform movement.

Raisin became an instructor for the New Jersey Normal School for Jewish Teachers in Newark, New Jersey, in 1925. He was a member of the Central Conference of American Rabbis, the New York Board of Jewish Ministers, B'nai B'rith, the Rotary Club, and the Manuscript Club. In 1909, he married Florence L. Steinhart. Their children were Beatrice Carol, Maxine (wife of Ellis Rosenthal), and Louise. Beatrice later became a Dr. of Rutgers University and the assistant Paterson child welfare director.

Raisin died in Florence, Alabama, where he was acting as temporary rabbi for Temple B'nai Israel, on March 8, 1957.
