= Fred Wesley Wentworth =

American architect (1864–1943)

- Born: August 3, 1864; Boxborough, Massachusetts, US
- Died: October 5, 1943 (aged 79); Paterson, New Jersey, US
- Education: Dartmouth College
- Occupation: Architect
- Design: Atwood-Blauvelt mansion Barnert Hospital; Stanley Theater; Paterson Post Office

Fred Wesley Wentworth (August 3, 1864 – October 5, 1943) was an American architect known for his extensive contributions to the architectural landscape of Downtown Paterson, New Jersey, as well as various residences and theaters across northeastern New Jersey. Wentworth played a pivotal role in reshaping Paterson following a devastating wind-driven fire that destroyed much of the city's central business district in 1902. His architectural portfolio encompassed a diverse range of building types, including institutional, commercial, residential, religious, and healthcare structures, as well as some of the nation's earliest movie theaters designed exclusively for motion pictures.

== Early life ==
Born on August 3, 1864, in Boxborough, Massachusetts, Wentworth was raised in Dover, New Hampshire. He graduated Dartmouth College in 1889 with a degree in architecture. While at Dartmouth, he was a founding member of the senior society Casque and Gauntlet.

== Career ==
Wentworth's professional career in Paterson started in 1888. When he first arrived, Paterson was a modest manufacturing town, but it experienced rapid growth, nearly tripling in population during his tenure. As the city expanded, Wentworth designed a wide array of new building types, including a post office, courthouse, movie theaters, parking garages, aeronautics factories, and other commercial buildings. In 1902 a fire devastated most of the center of the city and Wentworth was responsible for much of the rebuilding work needed afterward.

Throughout his career, Wentworth designed numerous notable buildings, some in collaboration with his draftsman and later partner, Frederick J. Vreeland. Many of his works are located within the Downtown Commercial Historic District of Paterson.

Wentworth was president of the New Jersey AIA and a member of the New Jersey State Board of Architects. He was recognized as a Fellow of the American Institute of Architects. He retired in 1933.

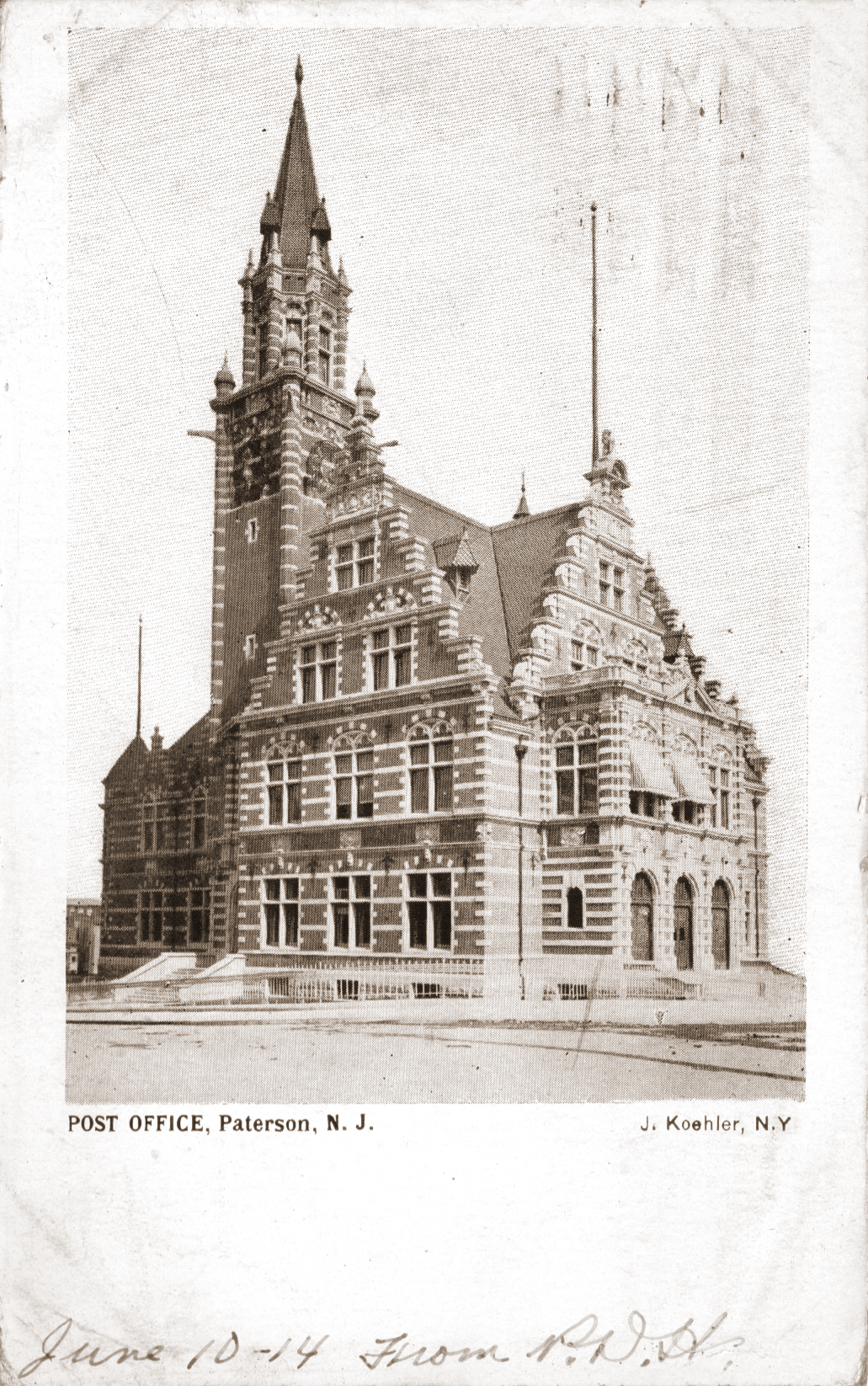
Paterson Post Office (1899)

=== Downtown Paterson ===
- United States Post Office (1899)
- Passaic County Courthouse (1902), supervising architect
- Walton Building (1903), 121 Ellison Street
- First National Bank Building (1910), Ellison Street
- Elbow Building (1913), 242-244 Main Street
- Gerstley Building (1913) 160 Main Street
- Barnert Hospital (1914) Broadway, demolished
- 622 Main Street (1920)
- Kitay Building (1920s)
- Masonic Temple (1923) 385-405 Broadway
- Alexander Hamilton Hotel (1925), 39-55 Church Street
- Alexander Hamilton Garage, demolished
- YM-YWHA Building (1925), Van Houten Street
- Fabian Building (1926), 31-51 Church Street
- Paterson General Hospital (1926), demolished
- YMCA Building (1929) 128 Ward Street
- Paterson Evening News Building

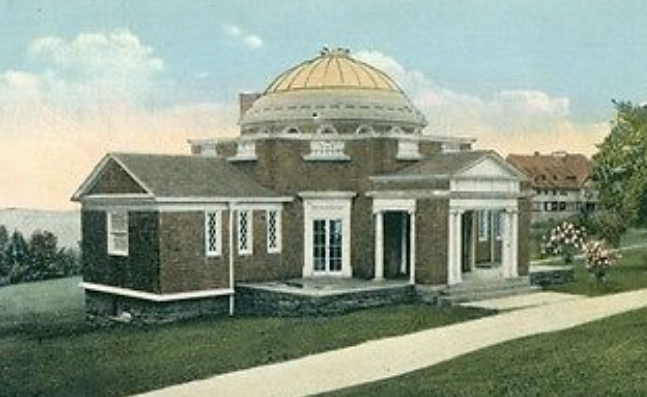
Loomis Sanitarium Library

=== Other public buildings ===
- Public School #10, Paterson
- Public School #13, Paterson
- Passaic County Tuberculosis Sanitarium (1928), aka Preakness Hospital Preakness, abandoned in 2009
- Passaic County Welfare Home (1936), Haledon and Wayne
- Valley View Sanitarium (1927–31), known as the Preakness Building
  - Nurses Residence, known as Passaic County Juvenile Detention Center
  - Storage Building
- Loomis Sanitarium Library

=== Religious buildings ===
- Broadway Baptist Church, Paterson
- Temple Emanuel (1929), Eastside Park Historic District, Paterson

=== Movie theaters ===
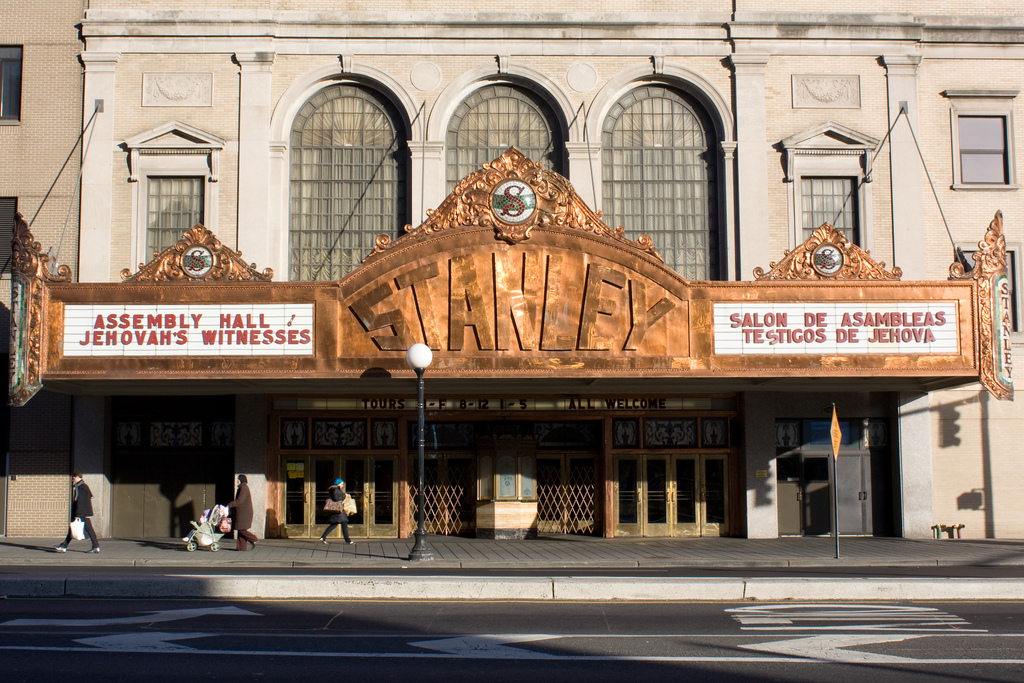
Stanley Theater

Wentworth was commissioned to build several movie theatres by Jacob Fabian including The Regent which was the first facility built exclusively for the exhibition of moving pictures and other movie palaces. Fabian is recalled in the cinema at City Center Mall, the Fabian 8.

- Regent Theater (1914), Downtown Paterson (demolished)
- Branford Theater (1920), Four Corners, Newark
- Fabian Theater (1925), Downtown, Paterson
- Ritz Theatre (1926), Midtown, Elizabeth
- Stanley Theater (1928), Journal Square, Jersey City

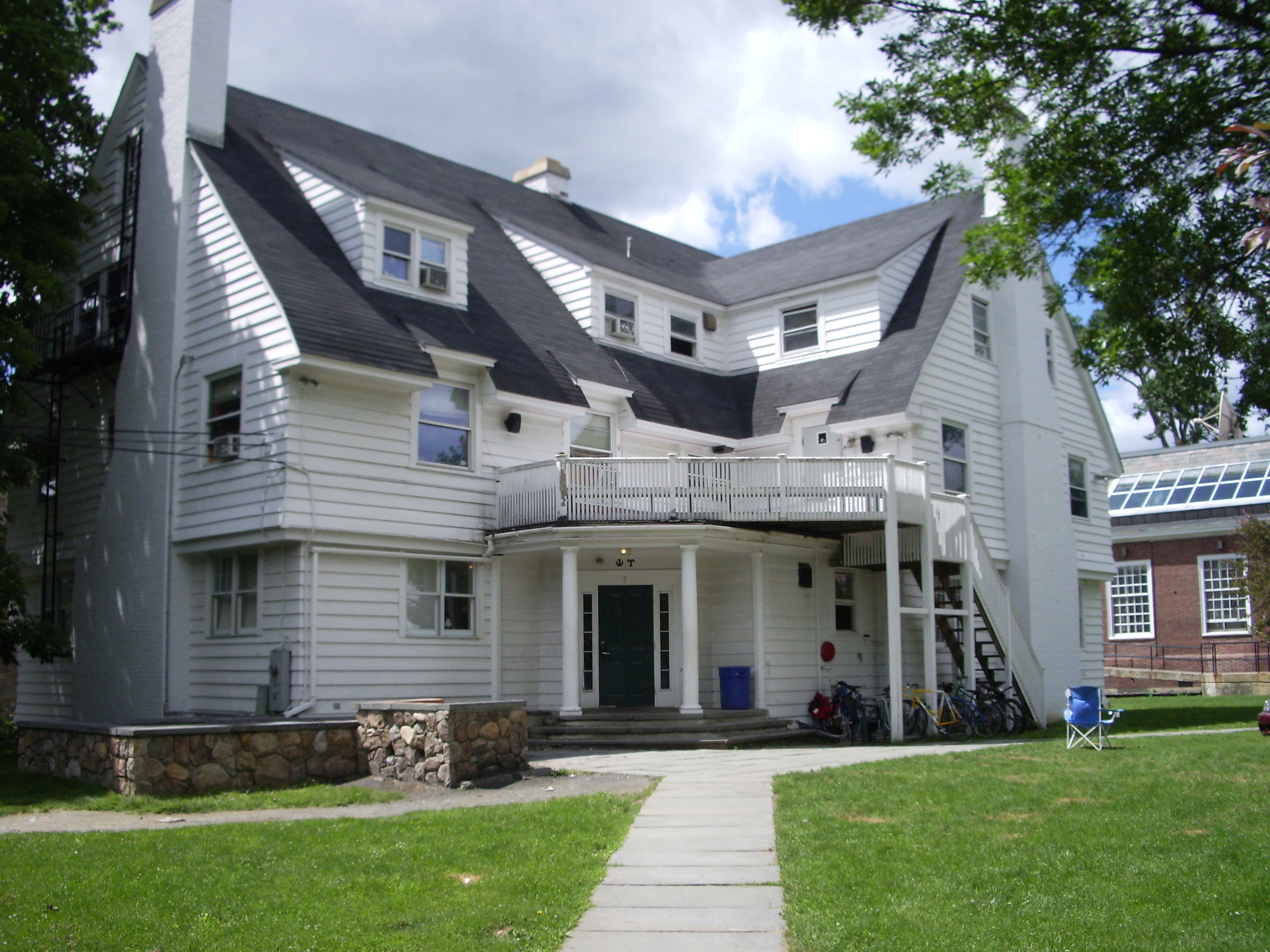
Psi Upsilon Fraternity House, Dartmouth College

=== Residences ===
- Psi Upsilon Fraternity House (1907), Dartmouth College, Hanover, New Hampshire
- Fred Wesley Wentworth House, Eastside Park Historic District, Paterson
- John W. Griggs House, Eastside Park Historic District, Paterson
- Hobart Manor (1915 expansion) for Garret Hobart, Wayne, New Jersey
- Atwood-Blauvelt mansion (1896–97), Oradell, New Jersey
- Casque and Gauntlet addition (1923), Dartmouth College, Hanover, New Hampshire
- Lucius Varney House, Dover, New Hampshire

== Personal life ==
On May 9, 1893, Wentworth married Florence Agnes Marie Hurlburt; the couple had no children. They lived at 630 East 27th Street in Paterson.

He belonged to the Hamilton Club of Paterson, the North Jersey Country Club, Scottish Rite Freemasonry, the Shriners, and the Sons of the American Revolution. He was a charter member of the Rotary. Wentworth was also a Republican and a Universalist.

Wentworth died on October 5, 1943, in Paterson at the age of 80. He was buried in Pine Hill Cemetery in Dover, New Hampshire.

== See also ==
- List of tallest buildings in Paterson
- National Register of Historic Places listings in Passaic County, New Jersey
