= Medical Missions for Children =

US-based non-profit organization

Medical Missions for Children is an independent, non-profit organization that works to improve health outcomes for critically ill children by providing individual telemedicine consultations and implementing education programs focused on narrowing the knowledge gap between healthcare providers in the United States and those in the developing world. MMC focuses on "transferring medical knowledge from those who have it to those who need it".

== About ==
Medical Missions for Children was founded in 1999 by Frank and Peg Brady. Its Global Telemedicine and Teaching Network (GTTN) currently serves over 100 countries throughout Latin America/Caribbean, Africa, North America, Asia/Pacific, Eastern Europe/Central Asia and the Middle East.

MMC is located on the campus of St. Joseph's Regional Medical Center in Paterson, New Jersey. It is a major stakeholder in The Hamiltonian, a 14-story hotel and conference center projected to open in 2016.

== The Global Telemedicine and Teaching Network ==
The Global Telemedicine and Teaching Network (GTTN) comprises several programs:

- The Medical Broadcasting Channel - A 24/7/365 channel airing medical programming via satellite broadcast, Internet2, and IPTV Networks.
- The Telemedicine Outreach Program - a network of 27 tier-one mentoring hospitals in the United States and Europe linking to hospitals and institutions in more than 100 countries.

This Medical Missions for Children/Paterson, NJ (MMC) should not be confused with Medical Missions for Children (MMFC), a 501(3)(c) charity based in Woburn, Massachusetts, that sends 13-15 surgical, medical and dental missions around the world each year to care for impoverished children who suffer from cleft deformities, microtia (absence of ear), head and neck abnormalities and severe, untreated burn injuries

== Television programs ==
MMC currently produces four healthcare series.

- Tomorrow's Medicine Today
- Plain Talk About Health
- Take Care
- Healthy U

== Awards and honors ==
- Co-Founder, Frank Brady, named 2008 World of Children Health Award Honoree

== See also ==
- Medical missions
