= Center City Mall =

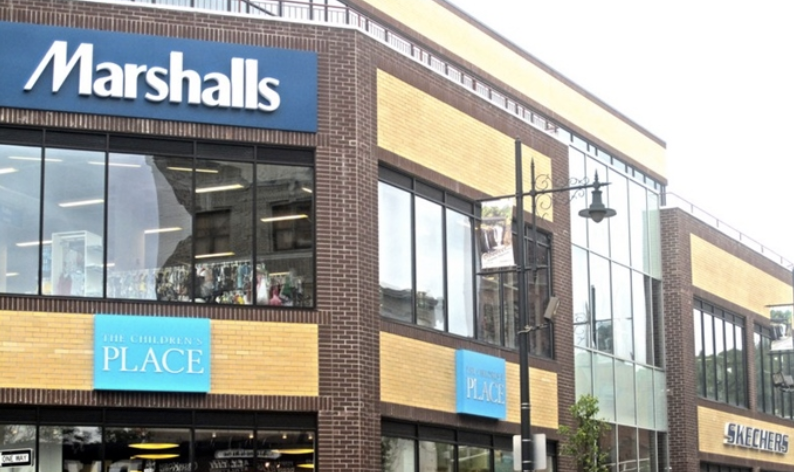
- Location: Paterson, New Jersey, United States
- Coordinates: 40.91498°N 74.17209°W
- Opened: 2008
- Manager: City of Paterson
- Owner: City of Paterson
- Num. of anchor tenants: 2
- Floor area: 320,000 sq ft (30,000 m^{2})
- Floors: 3
- Public transit: NJ Transit bus: 72, 74, 151, 161, 171, 190, 702, 703, 707, 722, 744, 746, 770, ES at Broadway Bus Terminal
- Website: centercitypaterson.com

Center City Mall is a shopping mall in Downtown Paterson, New Jersey. Built at a cost of over $100 million, the 320,000-square-foot (30,000 m^{2}) space opened in 2008 in the heart of the city's central business district. It is located with the city's urban enterprise zone, which permits merchants to charge half of the state's general sales tax rate (from 6.625% to 3.3125%).

Among shops are Marshalls, Burlington, The Children's Place, AT&T, PSEG, TD Bank, PriceRite and other shops and restaurants. It includes the eight-screen cinema, the Fabian 8, on the upper level. Hamilton and Ward is a restaurant located with the mall

The mall has struggled to retain tenants within the city with a population with limited buying power.

Various proposals have been put forth to expand the mall including a rooftop sports arena and underground parking using state credits. The redevelopers of the mall have also proposed a hotel.
