= Stanley Theater (Jersey City, New Jersey) =

Theater in Jersey City, New Jersey, US

- The Stanley
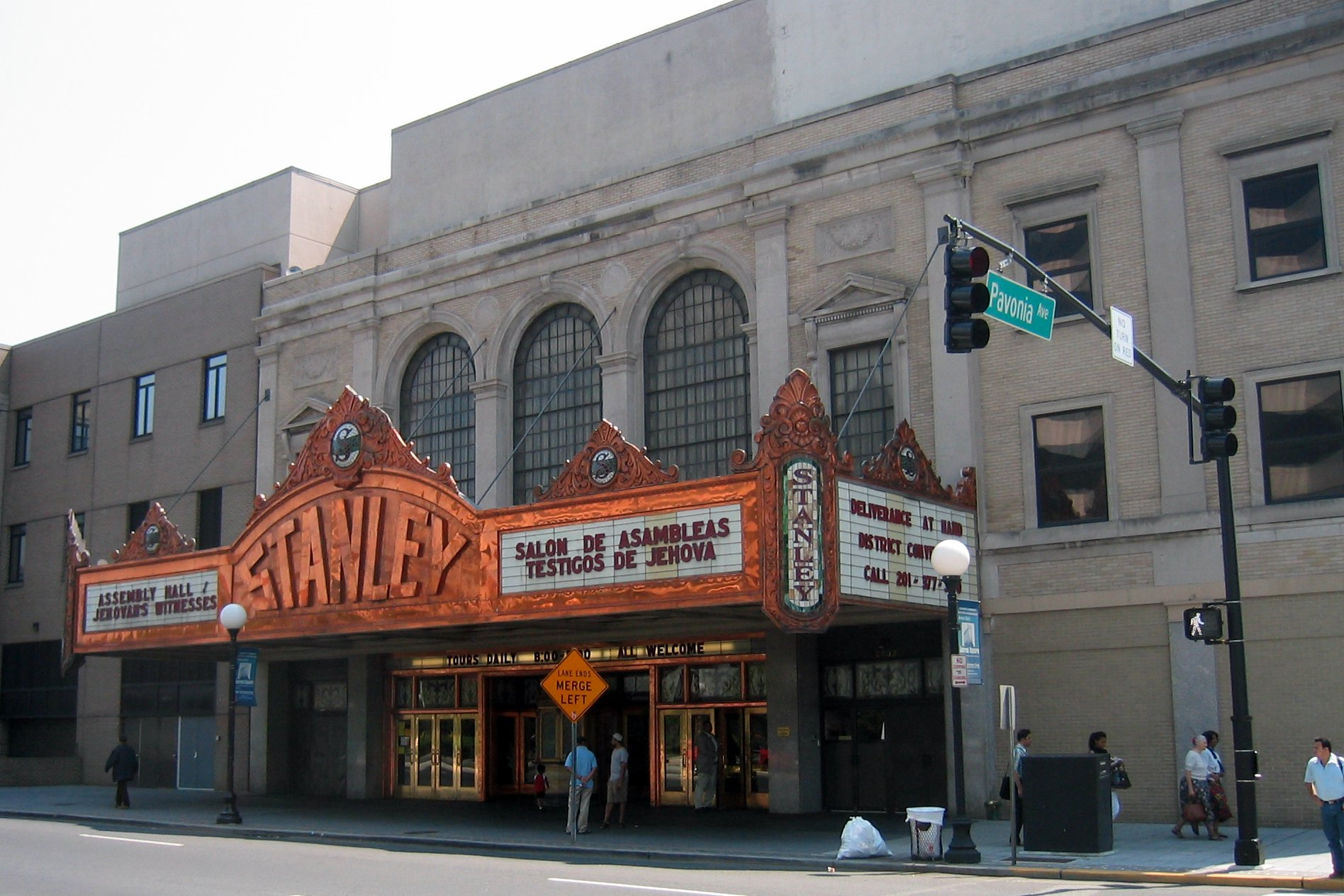
- Stanley Theater in 2006
- Interactive map of Stanley Theater
- Address: 2932 John F. Kennedy Blvd
- Location: Jersey City, New Jersey
- Coordinates: 40.7332°N 74.0621°W
- Owner: Jehovah's Witnesses
- Type: Movie Palace / Assembly Hall
- Public transit: Journal Square Transportation Center

Construction
- Opened: March 24, 1928
- Renovated: 1983, 2012
- Architect: Fred Wesley Wentworth
- Builder: John W. Ferguson Co.

Website
- www.jw.org

The Stanley Theater at Kennedy Boulevard and Pavonia Avenue is a historic theater in Journal Square in Jersey City, New Jersey.

== History ==
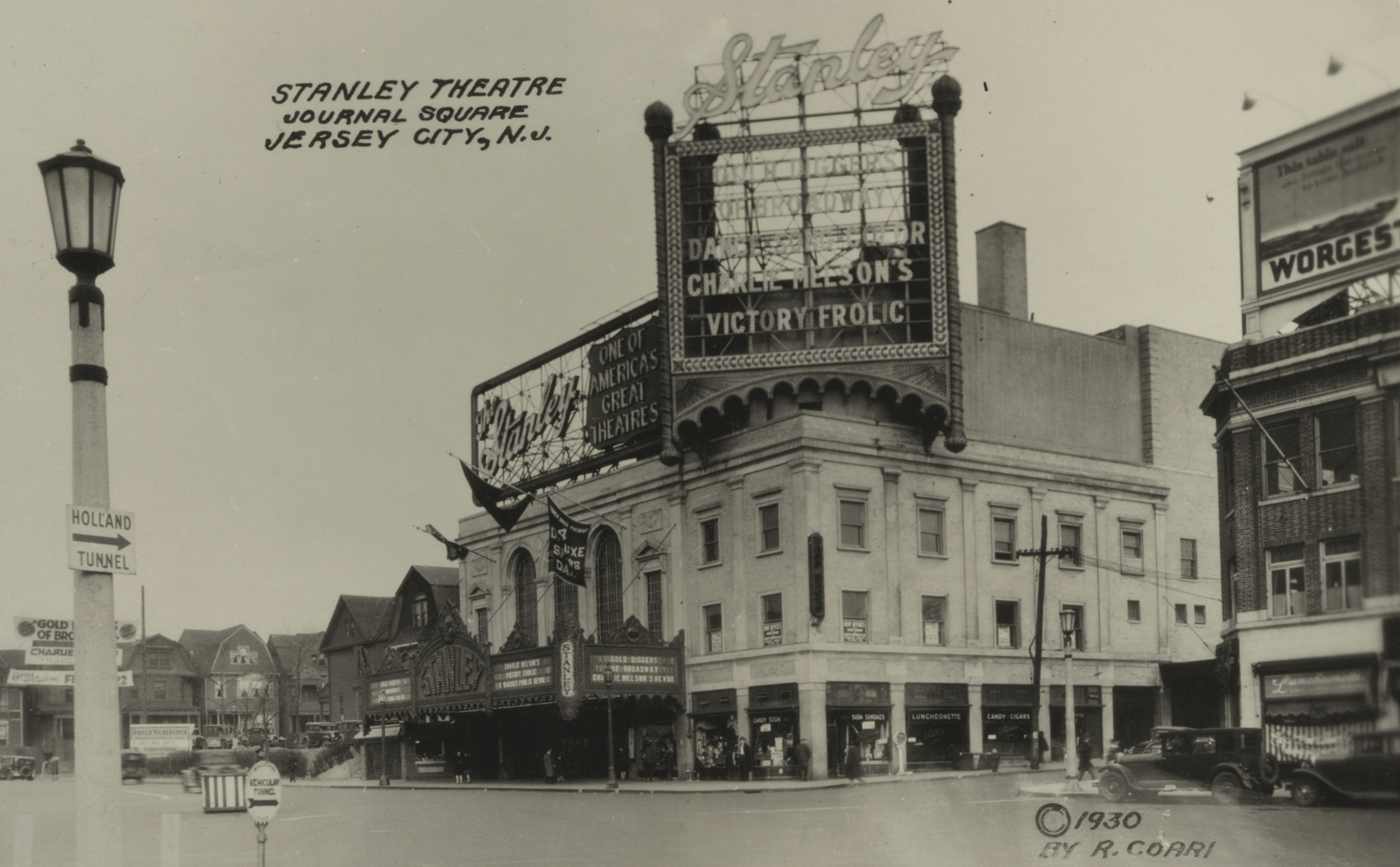
The theater in 1930

The Stanley Theatre was opened on March 24, 1928 with the feature film “The Dove” starring Norma Talmadge and Gilbert Roland. The supporting program included a stage show entitled “Sky Blues”, a newsreel and selections played on the ‘Mighty’ Wurlitzer organ (Opus 1836, type SP-3M, 3 manual, 27 ranks) by organist James F. Thomas. Mayor Frank Hague attended the ceremonies that evening and, with the audience, was greeted on the screen by actress Norma Talmadge.

The Stanley was designed by architect Fred Wesley Wentworth (1864-1943), who is noted for designing many buildings in Paterson following the 1902 fire. When it opened, its 4,300 seats earned it the rank of the second largest theater on the East Coast, behind only New York City's Radio City Music Hall. It was fourth in the country in number of seats in a one-screen theater, behind Radio City, and the Detroit and St. Louis Fox theaters.

For some years, the Stanley Theatre had stage shows to accompany the film presentations, and many of the greatest stars of their day, from Tony Bennett to The Three Stooges made appearances. The Stanley-Fabian chain was acquired by Warner Brothers in late-1928, and the Stanley Theatre remained a Warner Bros. operated theatre until the anti-trust decree of the late-1940’s forced studios to divest themselves of their theaters. The chain was sold to the newly formed Stanley Warner Corporation, later becoming acquired by the Glen Alden Corporation (GAC) to form RKO–Stanley Warner Theatres. The GAC had previously acquired the RKO Pictures theatre chain in the earlier anti-trust decree, and subsequently acquired and merged the Stanley Warner chain into its existing chain.

The Stanley Theatre continued as a premier movie venue for decades - even in the early-1960s it was still a place to get ‘dressed up for’. The engagement of “Whatever Happened to Baby Jane?”, starring Bette Davis and Joan Crawford broke all attendance records. Through the 1960’s, the Stanley Theatre struggled (as did all movie palaces) with the rush to the suburbs and the growth of television. It became a fairly popular spot for major concerts (including the Grateful Dead, Janis Joplin, Tony Bennett etc.) but movie attendance dropped drastically, and the building became quite deteriorated, suffering from water damage, peeling plaster, ill-advised ‘refreshing’ (i.e. painting all the metalwork glossy blue, selling the organ and most of the lobby furniture). It became dark and dingy, with the balcony and the front of the orchestra seats closed off. Finally, it could hold on no longer and was closed on April 20, 1978.

As mentioned above, the ‘Mighty’ Wurlitzer organ was sold off in the early-1970’s, and is currently very active entertaining school groups and concertgoers at the Van Andel City Museum in Grand Rapids, MI.

In 1983, the building was purchased by the Watch Tower Society for use as a convention and Assembly Hall for Jehovah's Witnesses.

There were only minimal changes necessary for the building to accommodate the religious needs of the new owners. Because of the talks done during the meetings, the ceiling was painted white and lighted with brilliant halogen lighting, to lessen distraction. The murals that were located in the lobby area, were said to have deteriorated beyond repair, and they were replaced by beautiful painted scenes, such as the Four Horsemen of Revelation, more appropriate for a house of worship. The orchestra pit was covered over, and converted into a baptismal pool. A directional sound system was added above the stage.

After nine months of restoration provided by over 5,000 Witnesses, the new Assembly Hall opened in August 1985, and has been the site for their religious Conventions & Assemblies ever since. In more recent years, the Assembly purchased the space next door to the theater and built an addition, to provide for two annex meeting rooms and multiple offices.

Beginning in October 2012, the theater underwent further renovation by over 2,000 Witness volunteers from across the United States.

== Description ==
A glittering copper marquee spans the entrance, with backlit green & red stained glass signs bearing the theater’s name. Underneath are solid brass doors with copper frames, and stained glass transom windows of faux "Chartre Blue" surround the foyer. Three large arched windows sit over the marquee. Building materials include marble from Italy, Vermont and Texas, limestone from Indiana in the lobby, and granite from Maine to face Corinthian columns in the auditorium.

The interior has a three-story lobby adorned with trompe l'oeil columns, a broad center staircase inspired by The Breakers grand staircase, with alabaster balusters, and brass handrails terminated with originally gaslit lamp stands.

Velvet drapes once adorned the lobby, and Allegorical paintings by Hungarian muralist Willy Pogany originally adorned the vaulted ceiling above the staircase.

The larger of two chandeliers, suspended from the second floor, is from the New York's original Waldorf-Astoria, dating to the 1890s; ^{[source needed]} Made in the European style called “Maria Teresa”, it is thirteen feet tall and ten feet wide, and illuminated by 144 bulbs that reflect onto 4,500 hanging “Bohemian crystal” teardrops. A direct gaze up at it reveals its snowflake shape.

Beneath the chandelier is the original mosaic compass, chiseled by hand. The floor in the lobby originally was made of white Terrazzo squares, outlined in gray mosaics. It has since been carpeted over, undisturbed in the renovation.

Movie palace architect John Eberson contributed the design for the auditorium. Here theatergoers enter the environment of an evening in Venice with a replica of the Rialto Bridge above the stage. Above the seating is an eighty-five foot ceiling that permits an open sky effect with stars and moving clouds, originally effected by a projecting device called a "Brenkert Brenograph," costing $290 (in 1920s dollars). Backlit stained glass windows line the walls, with grottoes, arches and columns simulating a courtyard motif. The original fire curtain continued the Venice effect, with a design that emulated the Venetian coast.

On September 26, 27, and 28, 1972, the Grateful Dead played three concerts at the Stanley Theater which are highly regarded among fans. A recording of the middle show from September 27 was officially released in 1998 as Dick's Picks Volume 11.

== See also ==
- Stanley Theater (Newark, New Jersey) (Newark)
- Loew's Jersey Theatre (Jersey City)
- Park Performing Arts Center (Union City)
