= Cornelius A. Cadmus =

American politician (1844–1902)

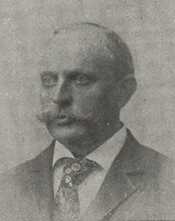

Member of the U.S. House of Representatives from New Jersey's 5th district
- In office March 4, 1891 – March 3, 1895
- Preceded by: Charles D. Beckwith
- Succeeded by: James F. Stewart
House positions
Chair of the United States House Committee on the District of Columbia
In office March 4, 1891 – March 4, 1893
Preceded by	William W. Grout
Succeeded by	John T. Heard

Sheriff of Passaic County
- In office 1887–1890

Member of the New Jersey General Assembly from Passaic County
- In office 1884–1885

Personal details
- Born: Cornelius Andrew Cadmus; October 7, 1844 Elmwood Park, New Jersey, U.S.
- Died: January 20, 1902 (aged 57) Paterson, New Jersey, U.S.
- Resting place: Cedar Lawn Cemetery
- Party: Democratic

Cornelius Andrew Cadmus (October 7, 1844 – January 20, 1902) was an American Democratic Party politician who represented New Jersey's 5th congressional district for two terms from 1891 to 1895.

== Biography ==
Born at Dundee Lake (now part of Elmwood Park, New Jersey), Cadmus attended public schools in New Jersey. After finishing schooling, he engaged in the feed and grain business in Paterson, New Jersey. He served as a member of the New Jersey General Assembly in 1884 and 1885, as well as Sheriff of Passaic County from 1887 to 1890.

=== Congress ===
Cadmus was elected as a Democrat to the Fifty-second and Fifty-third Congresses (March 4, 1891 – March 3, 1895), but did not put himself forward as a candidate for renomination in 1894.

=== Later career ===
He resumed his former business pursuits while also serving as a member of the board of inspectors of the New Jersey prison.

=== Death and burial ===
He died in Paterson, January 20, 1902, and was interred in Cedar Lawn Cemetery in Paterson.

== Notes ==
U.S. House of Representatives
Preceded by Charles D. Beckwith	Member of the U.S. House of Representatives from New Jersey's 5th congressional district March 4, 1891 – March 3, 1895	Succeeded by James F. Stewart
