= James F. Stewart =

American politician from New Jersey

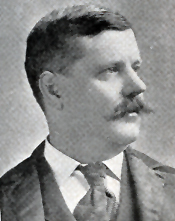

Member of the U.S. House of Representatives from New Jersey's 5th district
- In office March 4, 1895 – March 3, 1903
- Preceded by: Cornelius A. Cadmus
- Succeeded by: Charles N. Fowler

Personal details
- Born: June 15, 1851 Paterson, New Jersey, US
- Died: January 21, 1904 (aged 52) Paterson, New Jersey, US
- Party: Republican

James Fleming Stewart (June 15, 1851 in Paterson, New Jersey – January 21, 1904 in Paterson, New Jersey) was an American Republican Party politician who represented New Jersey's 5th congressional district in the United States House of Representatives from to 1895 to 1903.

== Biography ==
Stewart was born in Paterson, New Jersey on June 15, 1851. He attended the public and private schools of Paterson and graduated from New York University School of Law in 1870. He was admitted to the bar the same year and commenced the practice of law in New York City. He returned to Paterson and continued the practice of law in 1875, and served as recorder (criminal magistrate) of the city of Paterson from 1890 to 1895.

Stewart was elected as a Republican to the Fifty-fourth and to the three succeeding Congresses, serving in office from March 4, 1895, to March 3, 1903. He was chairman of the Committee on Expenditures in the Department of the Navy (Fifty-fifth through Fifty-seventh Congresses). Stewart was an unsuccessful candidate for reelection in 1902 to the Fifty-eighth Congress.

After leaving Congress, he resumed the practice of law in Paterson, where he died on January 21, 1904. He was interred in Cedar Lawn Cemetery in Paterson.

U.S. House of Representatives
Preceded by Cornelius A. Cadmus	Member of the U.S. House of Representatives from New Jersey's 5th congressional district March 4, 1895 – March 3, 1903	Succeeded by Charles N. Fowler
