= Atwood-Blauvelt mansion =

Historic residential building built in 1897

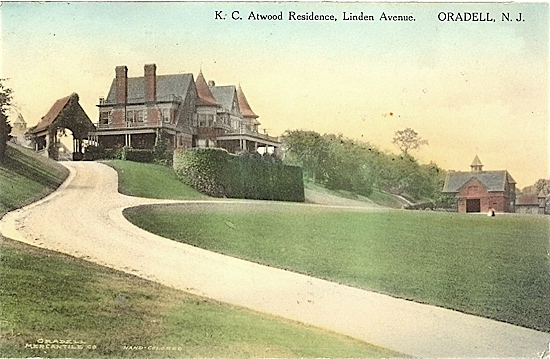
- The Atwood-Blauvelt mansion, photo c. 1909

- Location within Bergen County, New Jersey
- Former names: Northland, Bluefield

General information
- Architectural style: Shingle style
- Location: 699 Kinderkamack Rd., Oradell, New Jersey
- Coordinates: 40.964175°N 74.031833°W
- Construction started: Fall 1896
- Opened: June 1, 1897
- Client: Kimball C. Atwood
- Landlord: CareOne LLC

Technical details
- Floor count: 2½

Design and construction
- Architect: Fred W. Wentworth

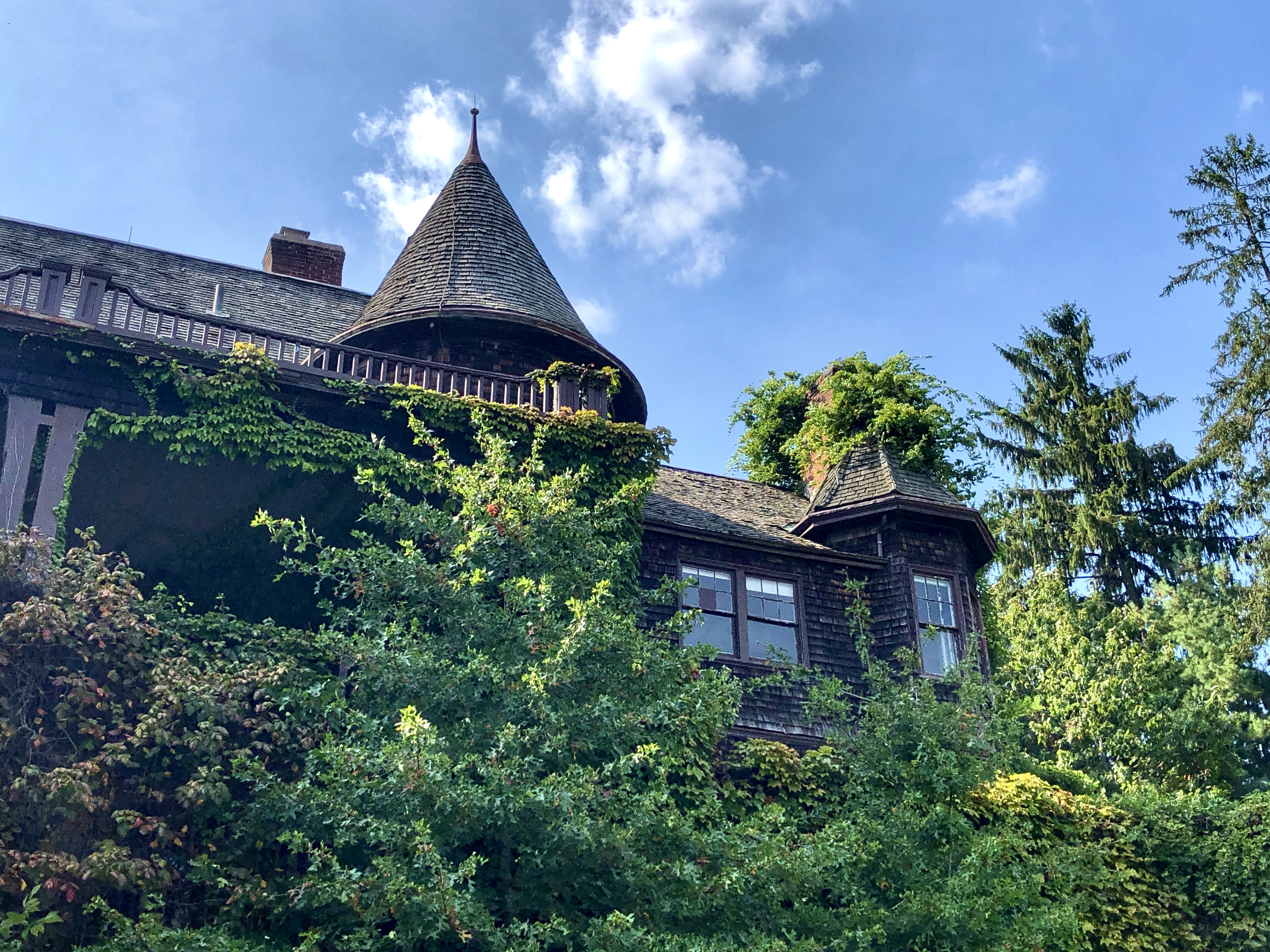
The mansion in 2019

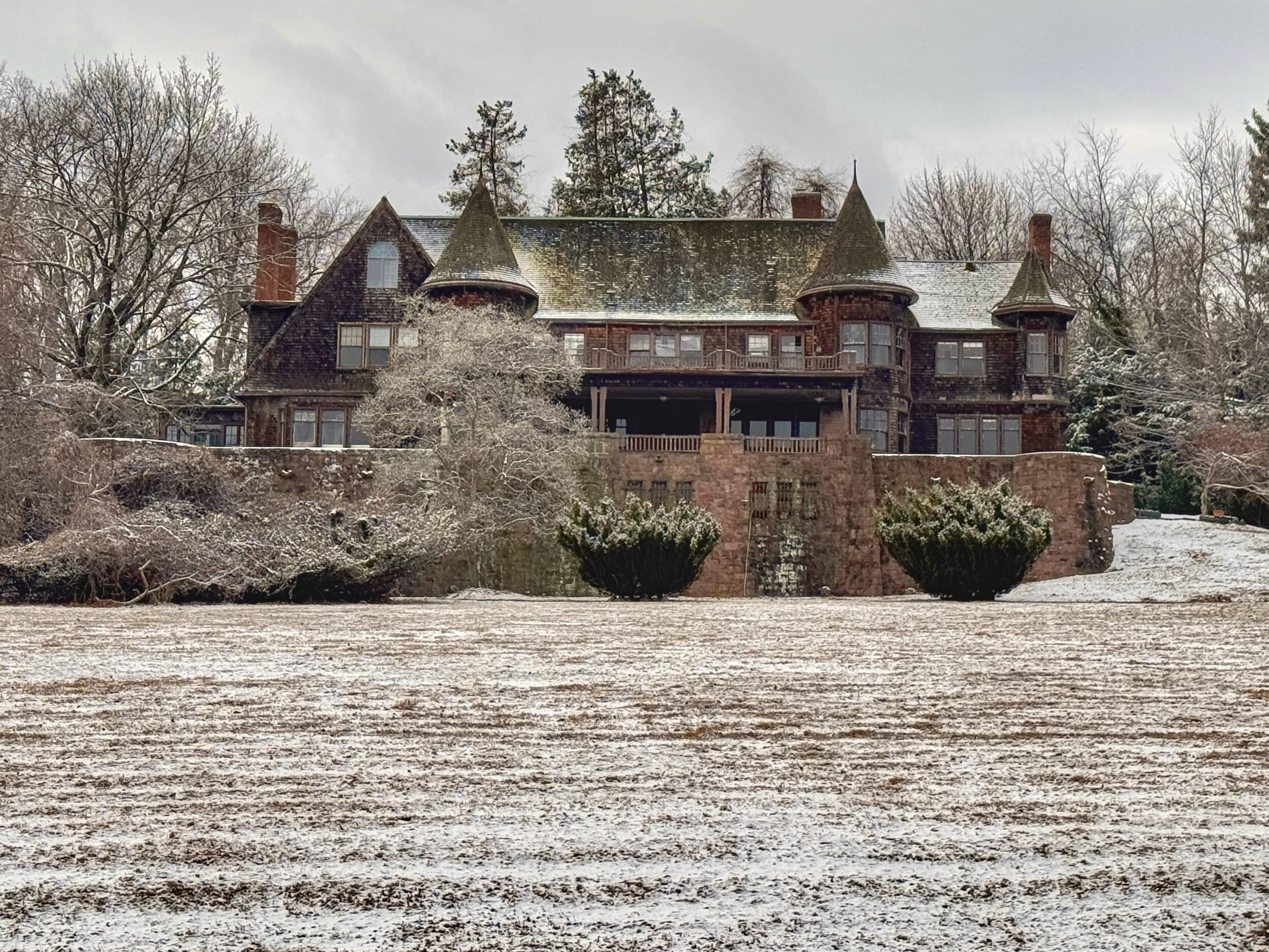
Atwood-Blauvelt mansion, January 2025

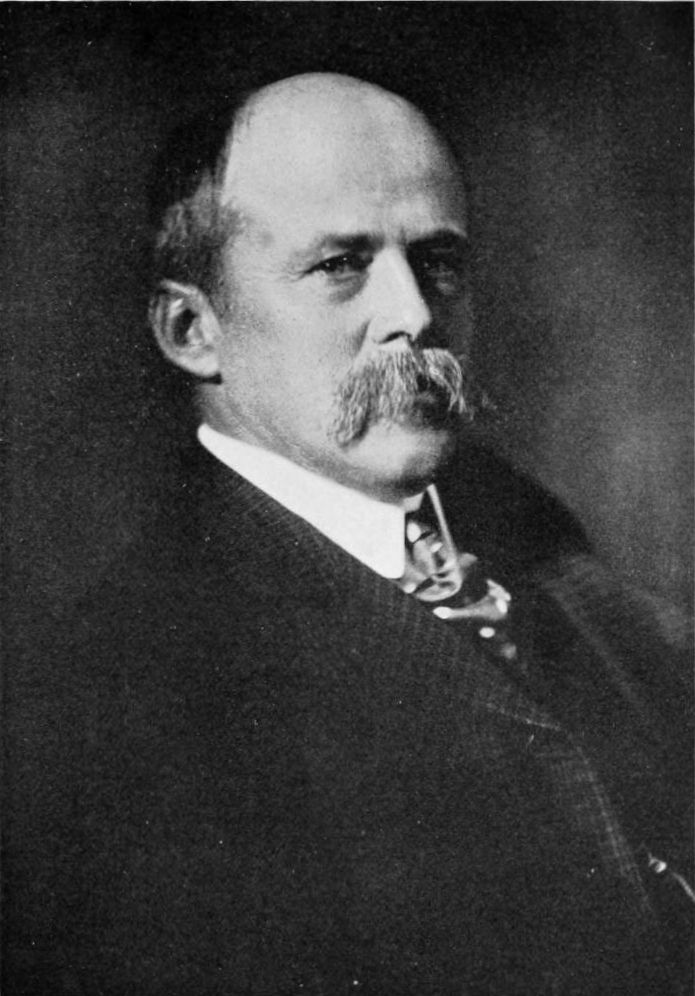
Original owner Kimball Chase Atwood

The Atwood-Blauvelt mansion is a historic residential building built in 1897 and home to the Hiram Blauvelt Art Museum. It is located on Kinderkamack Road in Oradell, Bergen County, New Jersey, in the United States. The mansion is a prominent example of shingle style architecture, which was popular in the United States in the late 19th century. The Atwood-Blauvelt mansion takes its name from original owner, Kimball Chase Atwood, and from its second owner, Elmer Blauvelt who bought it in 1926.

The 25-room mansion is situated on a large plot of land and fronted by a two-acre sloped lawn that comes down to Kinderkamack Road. Its location, prominent lawn, massive foundation, steeply pitched gable roof, and hexagonal towers with conical roofs make the mansion a landmark structure for the residents of the area.

In 1941, the Bergen County Panorama described the mansion as “the most imposing home in the (Hackensack) valley, a 16-room replica of a Norman castle on the site of a 1700 Dutch colonial homestead torn down in 1892."

As of 2015, the building has been allowed to deteriorate by its owner, Care One, raising concerns that it intends to demolish the historic building.

== History ==
=== Site ===
In the late 17th century, the property was part of a 261-acre estate belonging to an early settler from the Low Countries, Andries Tebow, whose direct 10th-generation descendant is former NFL quarterback Tim Tebow.

In the years preceding the erection of the Atwood-Blauvelt mansion, the property on which it sits was owned by Richard and Euphemia Van Wagoner, and contained a Dutch Colonial house, built of sandstone, that predated the American Revolutionary War. The Van Wagoners sold the property to insurance company founder and grapefruit magnate Kimball Chase Atwood of Clifton, New Jersey on October 1, 1895.

=== Atwood era ===
The Atwood-Blauvelt mansion was built during 1896-97 for Atwood, based on a design by Paterson, New Jersey architect Fred Wesley Wentworth (1864-1943).

Atwood (1853-1934), who was raised in modest circumstances, founded the Preferred Mutual Accident Insurance Association in 1885, and in the 1890s established the largest grapefruit grove in the world at the time, on the Manatee River near Bradenton in Florida. Atwood's grapefruit grove was the birthplace (1906) of the popular pink grapefruit variety.

Atwood spent $100,000 on the construction of the mansion (not counting outbuildings and land improvements). During the construction, The Hackensack Republican, a local newspaper, reported that Atwood's mansion "will be one of the grandest homes in northern New Jersey." Atwood christened his new home Northland.

=== Blauvelt era ===
Atwood sold the mansion in 1926 to Elmer Blauvelt, who renamed it Bluefield (which is the English meaning of "Blauvelt").

Elmer Blauvelt (1866-1938) and his son Hiram Bellis Demarest Blauvelt (1897-1957) had a coal and lumber business and were scions of the prominent Dutch Demarest and Blauvelt families, who have been living in Bergen County since the 17th Century. Hiram Blauvelt served in Africa during World War II and was a prolific hunter. His collection of stuffed animals and wildlife-related art served as the foundation of the collection of the Hiram Blauvelt Art Museum and Foundation, which was established pursuant to his will in 1957 and is today located in the carriage house adjoining the mansion.

After the deaths of Hiram Blauvelt (1957) and his mother Margaret Bellis Blauvelt (1961), the mansion was inhabited only by caretakers and was poorly maintained. In 1978, the Blauvelt estate sold the mansion to architect Raymond Wells, who protected it from demolition and renovated it.

=== Wells era ===
In 1996 Jeffrey F. Wells purchased the Blauvelt mansion from his parents and assumed the role as head of the second generation commercial architectural firm, Wells Associates. With his wife and their three children, Jeff Wells and his family generously hosted countless banquets, galas and holiday parties to support local and international causes and charities.

On the evening of the September 11 attacks, the Wells family opened their home to 11 orphans and many of their children's classmates who were unable to get home due to the local catastrophe.

In 2006, the mansion was listed for sale, when local neighbors fought the sale, a "friend" of the Wells family proposed a solution which resulted in the house going into foreclosure. Because Jeff Wells' family had leveraged the house to provide for consistent salaries to his office staff throughout the economic recession, those offering to help return the favor by saving the mansion, instead chose to grab the altruistic family's estate and among other things. During the 2008 financial crisis, Jeff was conned into a "quick fix" that resulted in his family's home going to auction. To add insult to injury, many of his family's possessions were "misplaced" including his eldest daughter's historic book collection which bears a stamp in the front page noting that the book was from her "Blauvelt Mansion" library. The stolen items have occasionally been spotted on secondary markets.

On March 22, 2013, the mansion was sold in a sheriff's auction to CareOne LLC, who paid $100 and assumed $3.9 million in mortgages on the property. CareOne hoped to build an assisted living facility on that location with the agreement of (Jeff Wells' older brother) Tom Wells, but their efforts were met with opposition from the community and the Oradell Zoning Board.

The preservation of the mansion remains uncertain as the town hopes for a boutique hotelier to sweep in and save the town's crown jewel. While the mansion has also been determined eligible for the New Jersey and National Registers of Historic Places, it has not been placed on either register as of 2024. Of the several outbuildings, only the carriage house survives. Since 1957 it has housed the Hiram Blauvelt Art Museum and Foundation.

Care One, which owns the mansion, has let animals move in to help it deteriorate, raising obvious concerns that the company is waiting for the day it can demolish and develop the property.
