= Stanley Theater (Newark, New Jersey) =

- U.S. National Register of Historic Places
- New Jersey Register of Historic Places
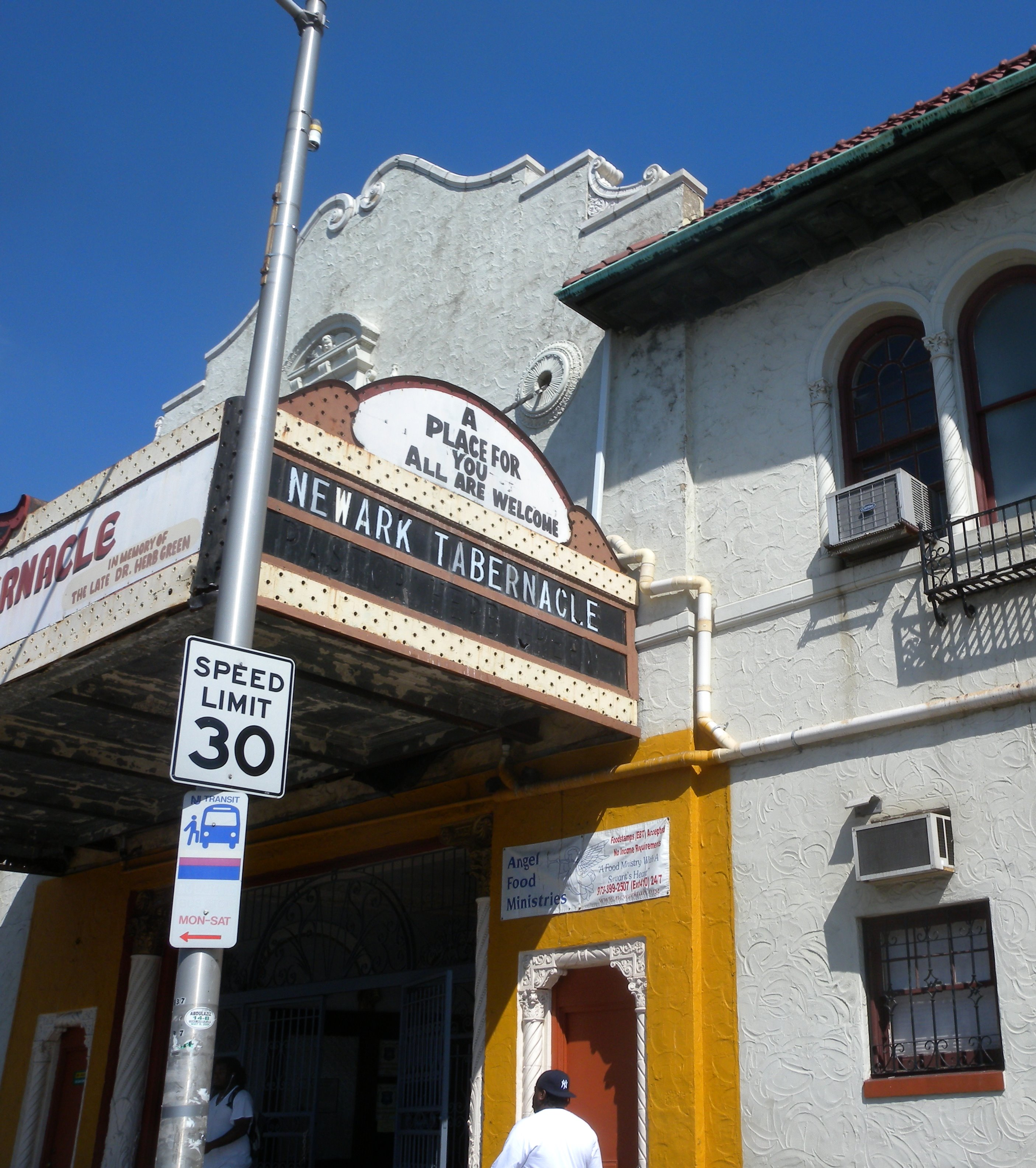

- Location within Essex County, New Jersey Location within New Jersey Location within the United States
- Location: 985 South Orange Avenue, Newark, NJ
- Coordinates: 40°44′48″N 74°13′46″W
- Area: 0.5 acres (0.20 ha)
- Built: 1927
- Architects: Grad, Frank; MacEvoy, Warren
- Architectural style: Mission/Spanish Revival
- NRHP reference No.: 86001957
- NJRHP No.: 1338

Significant dates
- Added to NRHP: August 28, 1986
- Designated NJRHP: July 17, 1986

The Stanley Theater is a former 2,000-seat movie theater located in Newark, New Jersey. It was built in 1927 and was turned into a social hall in the 1970s. It was added to the National Register of Historic Places on August 28, 1986.

"The Stanley Theater opened on May 26, 1927, as the latest suburban addition to the progressive chain of Stanley-Fabian Theaters, a local branch of the Stanley Company of America. The idea of a Spanish influenced theater was conceived by Louis R. Golding, an executive of Stanley-Fabian. Golding hired local architect Frank Grad, builder Warren MacEvoy, and supervised the construction himself. The choice of the Spanish influence for theater design was a reflection of the tastes of the times, when luxury and elegance in movie palace architecture were necessities."

"The Stanley Theater contained all the ingredients of an "atmospheric" theater: a magnificent amphitheater canopied by a glorious moonlit and star-studded sky in a Spanish patio. To produce the elaborate settings and atmosphere, lighting and weather equipment such as the cloud machines, was located on platforms behind the elaborate three-dimensional facades, concealed from public observation. Satisfactory lighting for the great span of sky was created by a combination of reflectors, lighting units, and small openings in the ceiling for producing star effects."

The Stanley Company of America merged with Warner Bros. Pictures in a move that unified the assets of Warner, Vitaphone, and Stanley. Stanley also controlled First National Pictures, and what is now famously known as the Warner Bros. Studios Burbank.

Warner Bros. operated the theaters until the anti-trust decree of the late-1940’s calling for separation of theaters from production and distribution. The theater portfolio was sold to newly formed Stanley Warner Corporation, with Warner Board of Directors S.H. Fabian and associates taking control in 1953, who already operated a circuit from New York to Virginia.

From 1980, it was the Newark Tabernacle.

As of November 2024, it's reported that after years of abandonment, "the owners of the building want to restore the 97-year-old theater’s lobby along with its historic marquee...The proposal, which came before Newark’s Landmarks Commission, was approved last month. The theater’s restored lobby will eventually become the entrance into a new five-story mixed-use building with 16 residential units on the top stories."

== See also ==
- National Register of Historic Places listings in Essex County, New Jersey
- Newark Symphony Hall
- Stanley Theater (Jersey City)
- McDonald's Gospelfest
