= Charles D. Beckwith (politician) =

American politician

Charles Dyer Beckwith
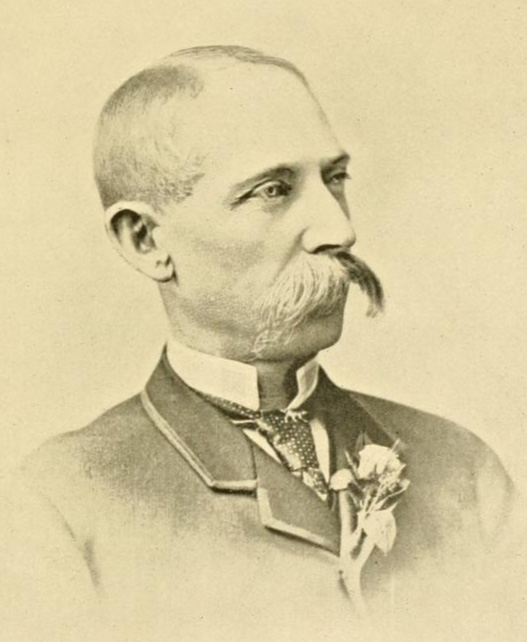

Member of the U.S. House of Representatives from New Jersey's 5th district
- In office March 4, 1889 – March 3, 1891
- Preceded by: William Walter Phelps
- Succeeded by: Cornelius A. Cadmus

Mayor of Paterson, New Jersey
- In office 1887–1888
- Preceded by: Nathan Barnert
- Succeeded by: Nathan Barnert

Personal details
- Born: October 22, 1838 Saratoga County, New York, US
- Died: March 27, 1921 (aged 82) Chatham Center, New York, US
- Party: Republican

Charles Dyer Beckwith (October 22, 1838 – March 27, 1921) was an American Republican Party politician from New Jersey who represented the 5th congressional district from 1889 to 1891.

== Early life and career ==
Beckwith was born near Coveville in the Town of Saratoga, Saratoga County, New York on October 22, 1838; attended private schools in Troy, New York, Philadelphia, Worcester, Massachusetts, and a military institution in New Haven, Connecticut. He moved to Paterson, New Jersey in 1860 and engaged in the manufacture of iron. He was a member of the board of aldermen in 1882, and Mayor of Paterson, New Jersey from 1885 to 1889. He was elected as a Republican to the Fifty-first Congress, serving in office from March 4, 1889, to March 3, 1891, but was an unsuccessful candidate for reelection in 1890 to the Fifty-second Congress.

== Death ==
After leaving Congress, he resumed manufacturing pursuits. He returned to the State of New York and settled on a farm in the town of Chatham in Columbia County, New York in 1897 and engaged in the management of his farm until his death near Chatham Center on March 27, 1921. He was interred in Chatham Center Rural Cemetery.

U.S. House of Representatives
Preceded by William Walter Phelps	Member of the U.S. House of Representatives from New Jersey's 5th congressional district March 4, 1889 – March 3, 1891	Succeeded by Cornelius A. Cadmus
