= Casque and Gauntlet =

Senior society at Dartmouth College, US

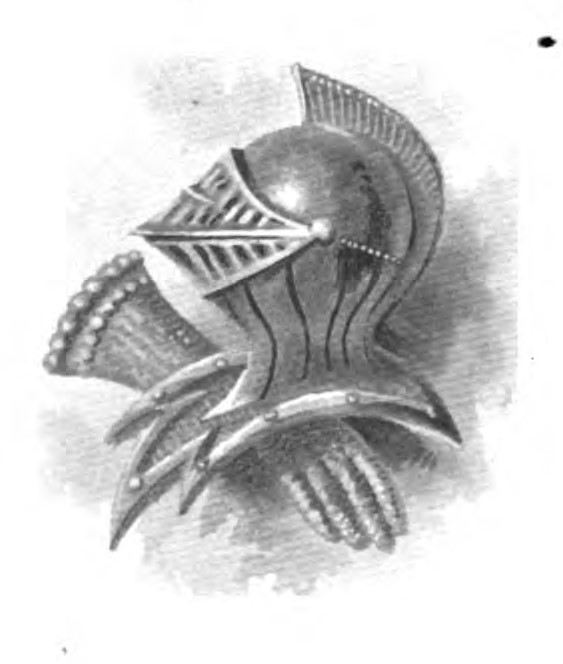
- Founded: March 1886; 140 years ago Dartmouth College
- Type: Senior society
- Affiliation: Independent
- Status: Active
- Scope: Local
- Symbol: Arthurian imagery
- Chapters: 1
- Nickname: C&G
- Headquarters: 1 South Main Street; Hanover, New Hampshire 03755; United States
- Website: casqueandgauntletsociety.org

Casque and Gauntlet (also known as C&G and the Casque and Gauntler Senior Society) is the second-oldest senior society at Dartmouth College in Hanover, New Hampshire. The mission statement of the organization is: "to unite in fellowship men and women of strong character and high ideals; to promote their mutual welfare and happiness; to render loyal service to Dartmouth College, and to aid and encourage one another in performing their duties to God and their fellow man."

== History ==
Casque and Gauntlet was founded in March 1886 by students at Dartmouth College. Albert J. Thomas had the idea of creating a senior society like those at Yale University and recruited Fordyce P. Cleaves and Wilder D. Quint. From those three, other potential members were recruited. The founders decided to limit the society's membership or annual delegation to nineteen seniors. The first delegation and founding fathers of Casque and Gauntlet were:

- Henry Osgood Aiken
- Samuel Colcord Bartlett Jr.
- William Lincoln Blossom
- William Parkinson Buckley
- Charles Lincoln Carpenter
- Fordyce Perkins Cleaves
- Henry Otis Cushman
- Fred Alonzo Fernald
- George Waldron Glass
- Albert Emerson Hadlock
- Fred Arthur Howland
- George Ellsworth Johnson
- Sydney Edwin Junkins
- Wilder Dwight Quint
- Harry Wyatt Ranlett
- Jesse Belmont Rogers
- James Clifford Simpson
- Albert James Thomas
- Fred Welsey Wentworth

Cleaves, Thomas, and especially Quint were inspired by Alfred Lord Tennyson's "Idylls of the King" and the other members agreed on this concept. They selected the organization's name to represent "truth, fidelity, and loyalty to each other". Its president was called Arthur, The Pendragon, after King Arthur, and the members took the names of the various Knights of the Round Table. Its ritual was written by Quint, with the Holy Grail as "the focal point of their fraternal life". Wentworth designed the society's pin. The group also develops its emblem, the profile of a knights helmet or casque with a glove or gauntlet. Its alumni association began publishing a newsletter and directories in the 1890s.

Initially, the group lacked a regular meeting place. At one point, they had four rooms above Cobb's Store but also used a cemetery and a barn on Stump Lane. C&G moved into a house at 1 South Main Street in the fall of 1894. The society dubbed their new residence "the Castle on the Corner".

Originally, membership in C&G ended upon graduation. In 1895, an Alumni Association was incorporated in Boston. Initially, the main activity of the association was organizing an annual dinner for alumni. However, the Alumni Association purchased the Castle in 1901. The house was transferred to the newly formed Trustees of Casque and Gauntlet in 1904.

A group adopted a new constitution and by-laws in 1923 and its collegiate group and Alumni Association merged into a single organization called The Casque and Gauntlet, giving all of its initiates a lifetime membership. In 1924, C&G published a songbook and began publishing its Bulletin. During World War II, the society stopped its activities and leased the house to the university. The university gave the Castle back to the society in July 1946. However, C&G struggled to rebuild its membership after the war and was financially depleted.

Once Dartmouth allowed female students C&G was criticized as a single-sex organization, especially after it voted to remain all-male in 1977-78. The 1979 delegation also voted to admit women after the encouragement of the university's board of trustees. Its first female King Arthur was elected in 1986.

== Symbols and traditions ==
The badge of Casque and Gauntlet is "the Bonnie Gold Pin." It was designed by founding member Wentworth. A sword called Excalibur, after the legendary sword of King Arthur, is laid on the shoulder of each new member as they are "knighted". Members of Casque and Gauntlet are called knights and ladies. Its emblem is a casque on top of a gauntlet.

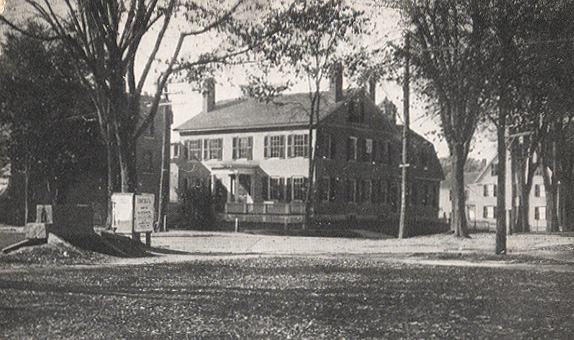
The Castle on the Corner, pre-1915

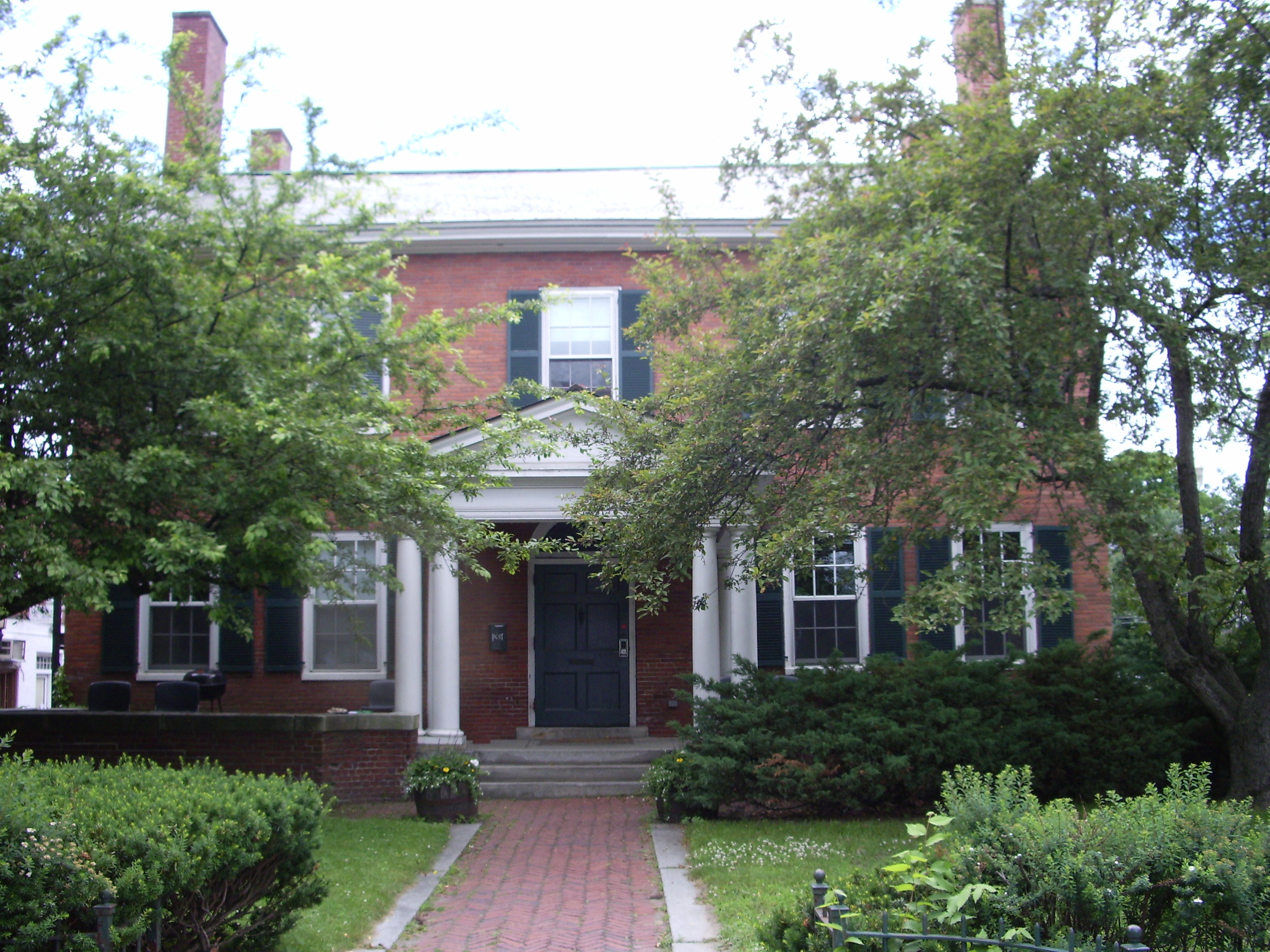
C&G house, 2007

== House ==
C&G moved into a house at 1 South Main Street in the fall of 1894. The society dubbed their new residence "the Castle on the Corner". The house was built in 1823 by Dr. Samuel Alden who lived there until he died in 1842; Joseph Emerson lived there until 1888 when it became a boarding house for students owned by Susan Brown. The Castle was rented from Brown under a long-term lease.

The Alumni Association purchased the Castle in 1901. The alumni launched a campaign in 1911 to raise funds to improve the house, including selling stock to alumni. In 1915, the society installed a rear addition designed by architect Fred Wesley Wentworth, a founding member.

In August 2020, the society leased its house at 1 South Main Street to the college as graduate student housing for three years. This was done because its use as an undergraduate residence was no longer financially sustainable. In January 2024, C&G sold its former chapter house to the Dartmouth and also donated $2.5 million of the proceeds to the college.

== Membership ==
Members of C&G nominate and select tappees as a group. Tapping takes place at a time the College coordinates with the other senior societies, usually around Winter Carnival. In the 1950s, the society discontinued its practice of blackballing, instead relying on a system of prospects receiving a 75 percent vote to be tapped. It also experimented with allowing each member to select their own replacement. Following coeducation at Dartmouth in 1972, the class of 1979 delegation voted unanimously to nominate women for membership. Members are selected based on achievement, character, and service to Dartmouth.

C&G is co-ed. The first six women members of C&G joined the class of 1980 delegation.

While C&G's membership is not secret, some elements of the society are kept secret, as one might expect from a sorority or fraternity. Society meetings, held — like all Dartmouth senior societies — on Monday nights, are closed; the initiation ceremony and other details are also kept secret.

== See also ==
- Dartmouth College student groups
- Collegiate secret societies in North America
