= Miriam Barnert Hebrew Free School =

Coordinates: 40.918°N 74.157°W

Information
- Established: 1904; 122 years ago

The Miriam Barnert Hebrew Free School was dedicated on September 27, 1904 in Paterson, New Jersey by Nathan Barnert. The school offered instruction in biblical and post-biblical Jewish history.
