= Barnert Hospital =

Coordinates: 40.9176°N 74.1441°W

Barnert Medical Arts Complex
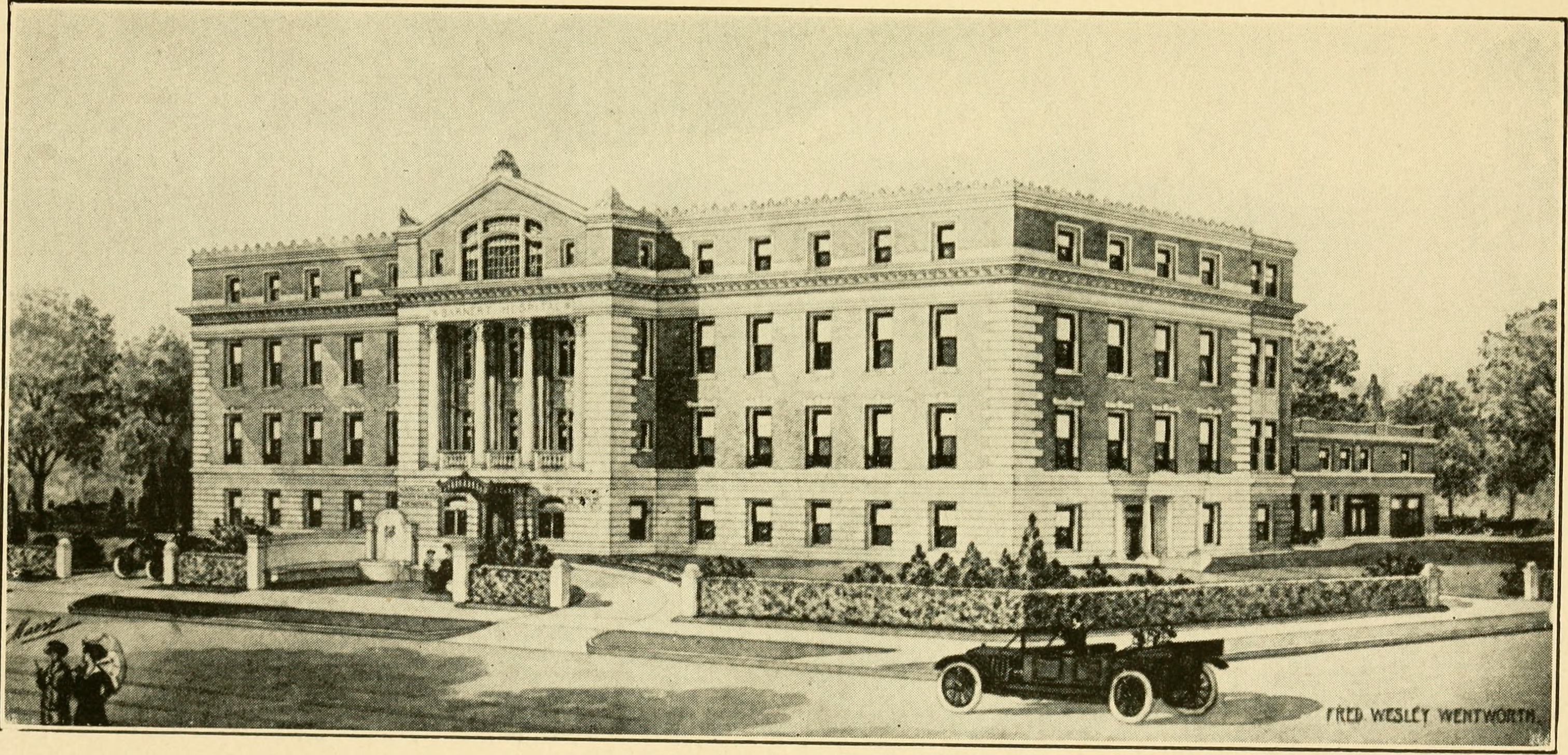

Geography
- Location: Paterson, New Jersey, United States

Organization
- Type: Specialist
- Patron: Nathan Barnert

Services
- Beds: 236
- Specialty: Perinatal care

History
- Opened: 1908

Links
- Website: www.cha-properties.com
- Lists: Hospitals in New Jersey

Barnert Hospital was a 236-bed hospital at 680 Broadway in the Eastside section of Paterson, New Jersey that operated for 99 years. The hospital was named for Nathan Barnert, a philanthropist and former mayor of Paterson who founded the hospital. In 1914, Barnert donated a site at East 30th Street and Broadway and provided an endowment. The original building was designed by Fred Wesley Wentworth in the classical revival style, constructed of a pink granite base and yellow brick with extensive detailing and other elaborate materials. it stood until the mid-1960s when it was demolished for a more modern structure.

The hospital was a full-service facility offering perinatal care, family care services and an outpatient infusion unit treating high risk pregnancies and hematology-oncology patients. Its operations were drastically scaled back in its last years of operation due to serious financial difficulties. The hospital sought Chapter 11 Bankruptcy protection in August, 2007. The hospital initially intended to close on September 28, 2007, due to a lack of funds. However soon after the announcement both the State and Federal governments appropriated $3.5 million to keep the hospital open while a buyer was sought. Several groups attempted unsuccessfully to raise $3.5 million in order to purchase the facility and convert it into a multi-use specialty hospital. The bankruptcy court reviewed bids, however these plans did not materialize and the hospital announced its closure on February 1, 2008. The hospital closed officially on May 30, 2008.

Following Barnert's bankruptcy, the facility was purchased by Community Healthcare Associates and reorganized as a 'medical arts complex.' As of September 17, 2009, Barnert is at over 90% capacity with tenants that include pharmacists, hospice care, an adult day-care center, a sub-acute rehabilitation center and group practices that provide primary care. The $15 million renovation by CHA included a new heating and cooling system, with the building being completely retrofitted with new floors installed. The Barnert Medical Arts Complex is now flourishing and serves as a model for struggling acute care hospitals around New Jersey.

== See also ==
- St. Joseph's Regional Medical Center
