= Nathan Barnert =

American businessman, politician and philanthropist (1828 - 1937)

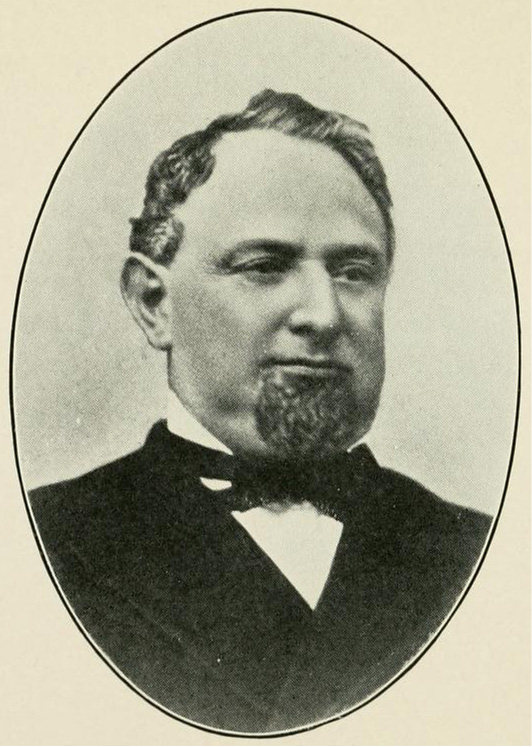
- Barnert pictured as mayor of Paterson, circa 1880s

Mayor of Paterson, New Jersey
- In office 1883–1886
- Preceded by: David S. Gillmor
- Succeeded by: Charles D. Beckwith
- In office 1889–1890
- Preceded by: Charles D. Beckwith
- Succeeded by: Thomas Beveridge

Personal details
- Born: September 20, 1838 Posen, Prussia (modern Poznań, Poland)
- Died: December 23, 1927 (aged 89) Paterson, New Jersey, U.S.
- Party: Democratic
- Spouse: Miriam Barnert

Nathan Barnert (September 20, 1838 – December 23, 1927) was an American businessman, philanthropist, and Democratic Party politician who served as the mayor of Paterson, New Jersey from 1883 to 1886 and 1889 to 1890.

== Early life and education ==
Nathan Barnert was born on September 20, 1838, in Posen in the Kingdom of Prussia to Jewish parents, Meyer and Ida (née Newfelt) Barnert. The family emigrated to the United States in 1848 or 1849. Nathan was educated in Prussia and New York City.

== Business career ==
Barnert followed his father into trade as a tailor before leaving to join the California gold rush at the age of fourteen. While in California, he established business connections in San Francisco and visited the Hawaiian Kingdom and the Fraser River. However, the trip was entirely unprofitable, and he returned to New York City in 1856.

In 1861, the family moved to Paterson, New Jersey, where he opened a merchant tailoring firm with Marks Cohen. They were granted large federal contracts to clothe the Union army during the American Civil War. Barnert also made successful real estate investments, and by 1876, he retired from business to focus on his property holdings.

In addition to his tailoring and real estate interests, he organized the Annandale Screen Plate Company with Robert A. Healy and William C. Martin. The company provided supplies to paper mills. This grew into an enterprise to build rental buildings for mill operators, the first of which was completed in 1882, followed by several other mills.

== Political career ==
In 1870, the Paterson board of aldermen commissioned Barnert to audit the city's accounts, which resulted in the prosecution and imprisonment of a number of city officials for breach of trust. The investigation and subsequent prosecutions raised his public profile and led to a career in politics.

In 1876, the Democratic Party nominated Barnert for alderman in the sixth ward, and he was elected. His success on the board led the Democrats to nominate him for mayor in 1883. Despite the city's typical Republican majority, he was elected to two terms as mayor in 1883 and 1889. Throughout his term as mayor, Barnert had a combative relationship with the board of aldermen, whom he accused of graft.

== Personal life and death ==
Barnert married Miriam Phillips of London, England on September 2, 1863. Her brother was lord mayor of London George Faudel-Phillips. She died on March 31, 1901; they had no children.

Barnert was a member of B'nai B'rith, the Knights of Pythias, the Freemasons, the Odd Fellows and was president of his temple and the city's Hebrew school. He led the construction of Nathan Barnert Memorial Temple in Paterson, NJ, since relocated to Franklin Lakes, NJ, the cornerstone for which was laid by President William McKinley.

Barnert died in Paterson of pneumonia on December 23, 1927. Pallbearers at his funeral included Nicholas Murray Butler, Louis Bamberger, and Felix Fuld.

=== Legacy ===
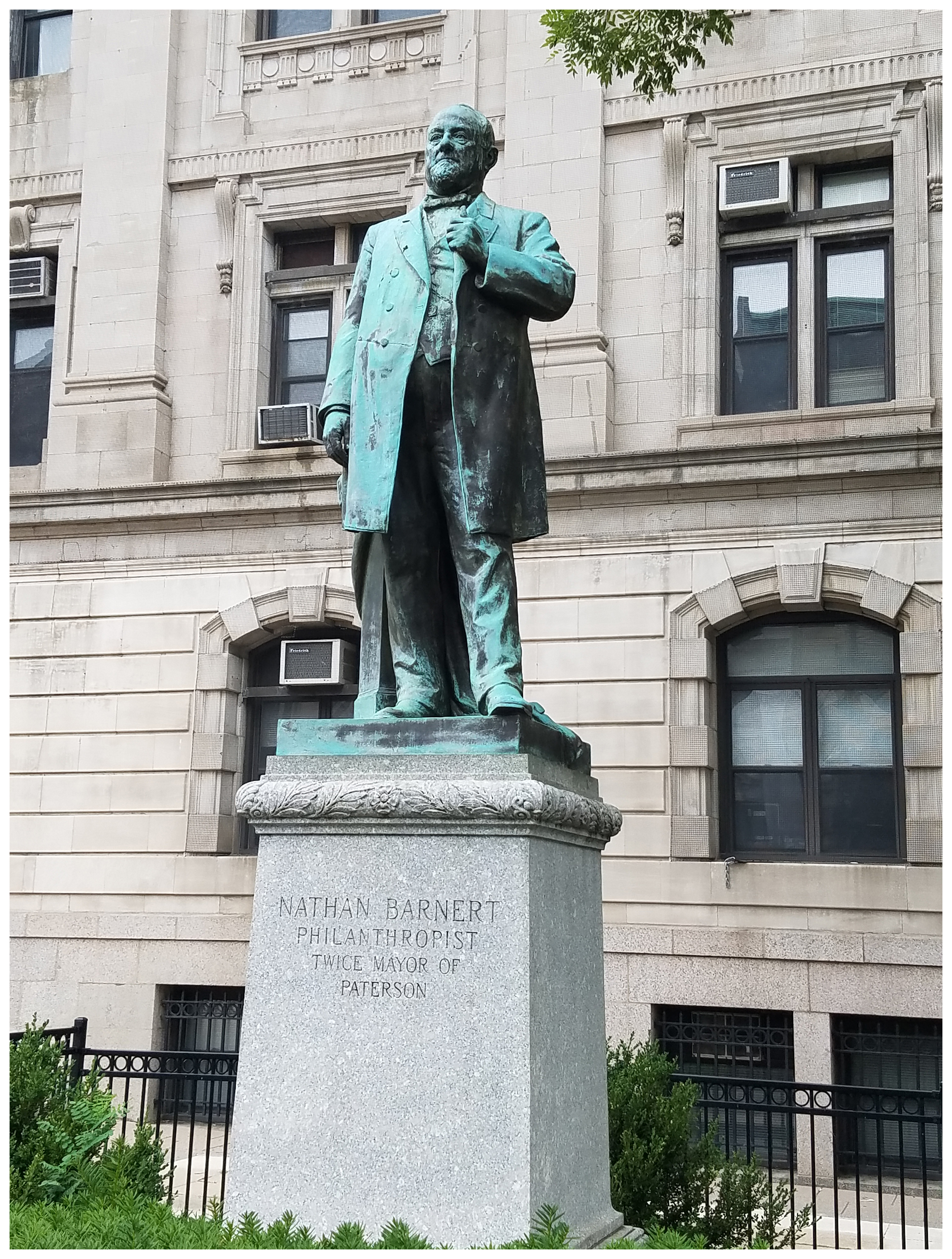
Statue of Nathan Barnert in front of Paterson City Hall. Dedicated October 28, 1925.

Barnert is one of three men, along with Garret Hobart and former mayor Andrew McBride, to be honored with copper statues in front of Paterson City Hall. The statute was erected in 1926.

By the time of his death, Barnert had donated over $1 million (approximately $14 million in 2024) to Paterson charities. Many Jewish institutions in the Paterson area were founded by Barnert, including the Miriam Barnert Hebrew Free School (1904), the Barnert Memorial Hospital (1908), the Daughters of Miriam Home for the Aged and Orphans (1921). Barnert Memorial Temple in Franklin Lakes is also named in his honor.
