= Barnert Temple =

Reform Jewish synagogue in New Jersey, US

- Location in Bergen County, New Jersey

Religion
- Affiliation: Reform Judaism
- Ecclesiastical or organisational status: Synagogue
- Leadership: Rabbi Rachel Steiner; Rabbi Eliza Scheffler (Assistant); Rabbi Elyse Frishman (Emerita)
- Status: Active

Location
- Location: 747 Route 208 South, Franklin Lakes, Bergen County, New Jersey 07417
- Country: United States
- Coordinates: 41°00′49″N 74°12′38″W

Architecture
- Type: Synagogue
- Established: 1847 (as a congregation)
- Completed: 1987

Website
- barnerttemple.org

The Barnert Memorial Temple is a Reform Jewish synagogue located at 747 Route 208 South, in Franklin Lakes, Bergen County, New Jersey, in the United States.

The congregation is led by Rabbi Rachel Steiner.

== History ==
The synagogue is the place of worship for the Congregation B'nai Jeshurun (transliteration from Hebrew as "Children of the Upright"), founded in Paterson in 1847. The name "Barnert Memorial Temple" originally referred to its landmark building at Broadway and Straight Street in Paterson. It was named in honor of Miriam Barnert, the wife of Nathan Barnert, a local real estate developer and Mayor of Paterson, who donated the building in 1894. In 1970, the Paterson former synagogue building was deconsecrated and converted into a warehouse.

In 1987, the congregation moved to a new temple building in Franklin Lakes.

Helga Newmark was the first female Holocaust survivor ordained as a rabbi; she was ordained in 2000 and served as a rabbi at Barnert Temple for two years.
