= Paterson City Hall =

- U.S. National Register of Historic Places
- New Jersey Register of Historic Places
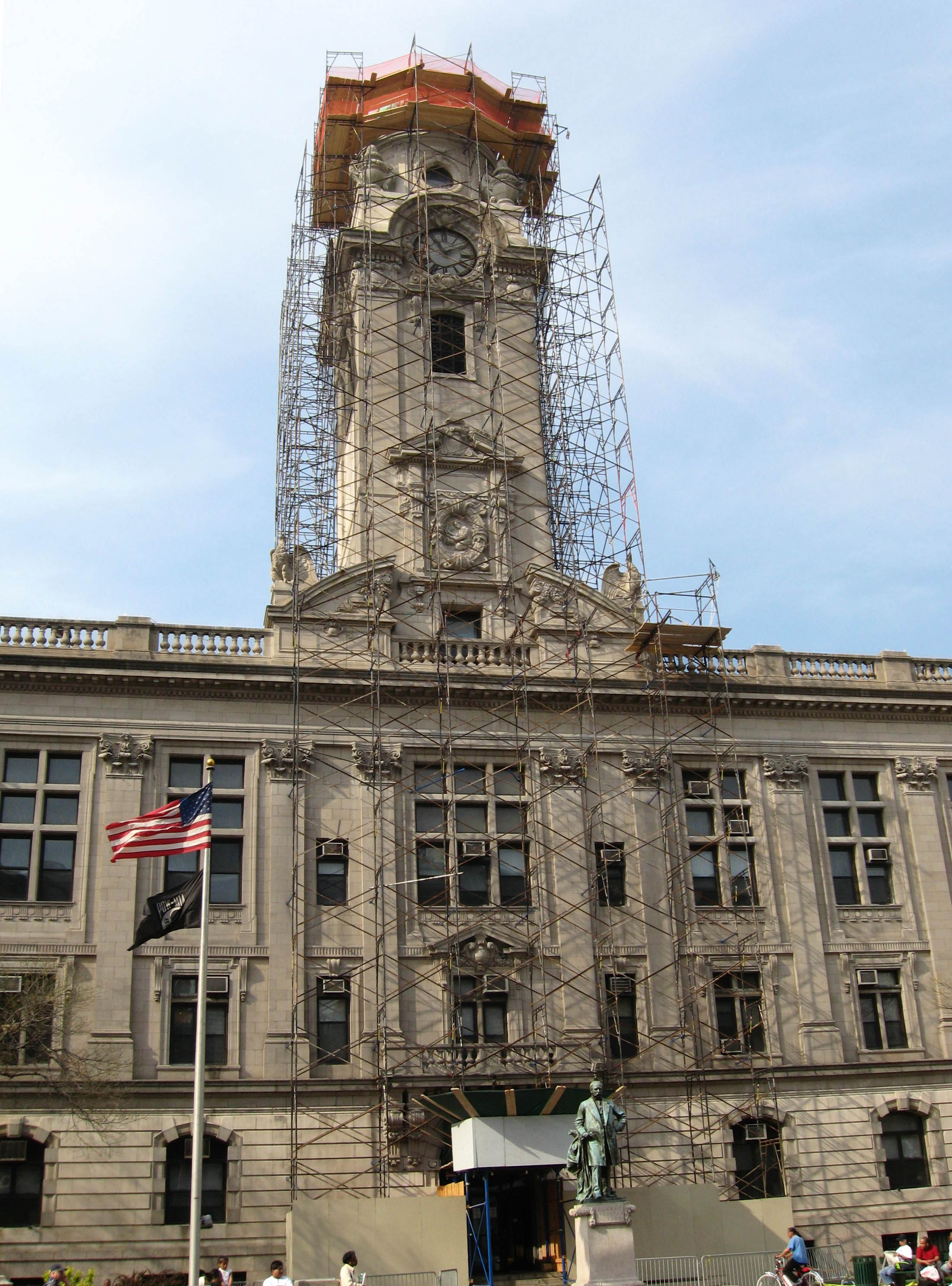

- Location within Passaic County, New Jersey Location within New Jersey Location within the United States
- Location: 155 Market Street, Paterson, New Jersey
- Coordinates: 40°55′0″N 74°10′19″W
- Area: 0.6 acres (0.24 ha)
- Built: 1896
- Architect: Carrere & Hastings; Vandehoff, Peter, & Son
- Architectural style: Beaux Arts
- NRHP reference No.: 95000232
- NJRHP No.: 2369

Significant dates
- Added to NRHP: March 10, 1995
- Designated NJRHP: January 30 1995

Paterson City Hall is located at 155 Market Street in Paterson, Passaic County, New Jersey. The building is located on a block in Downtown Paterson bordered by Market Street on the north, Colt Street to the east, Ellison Street to the south, and Washington Street to the west.

== History ==
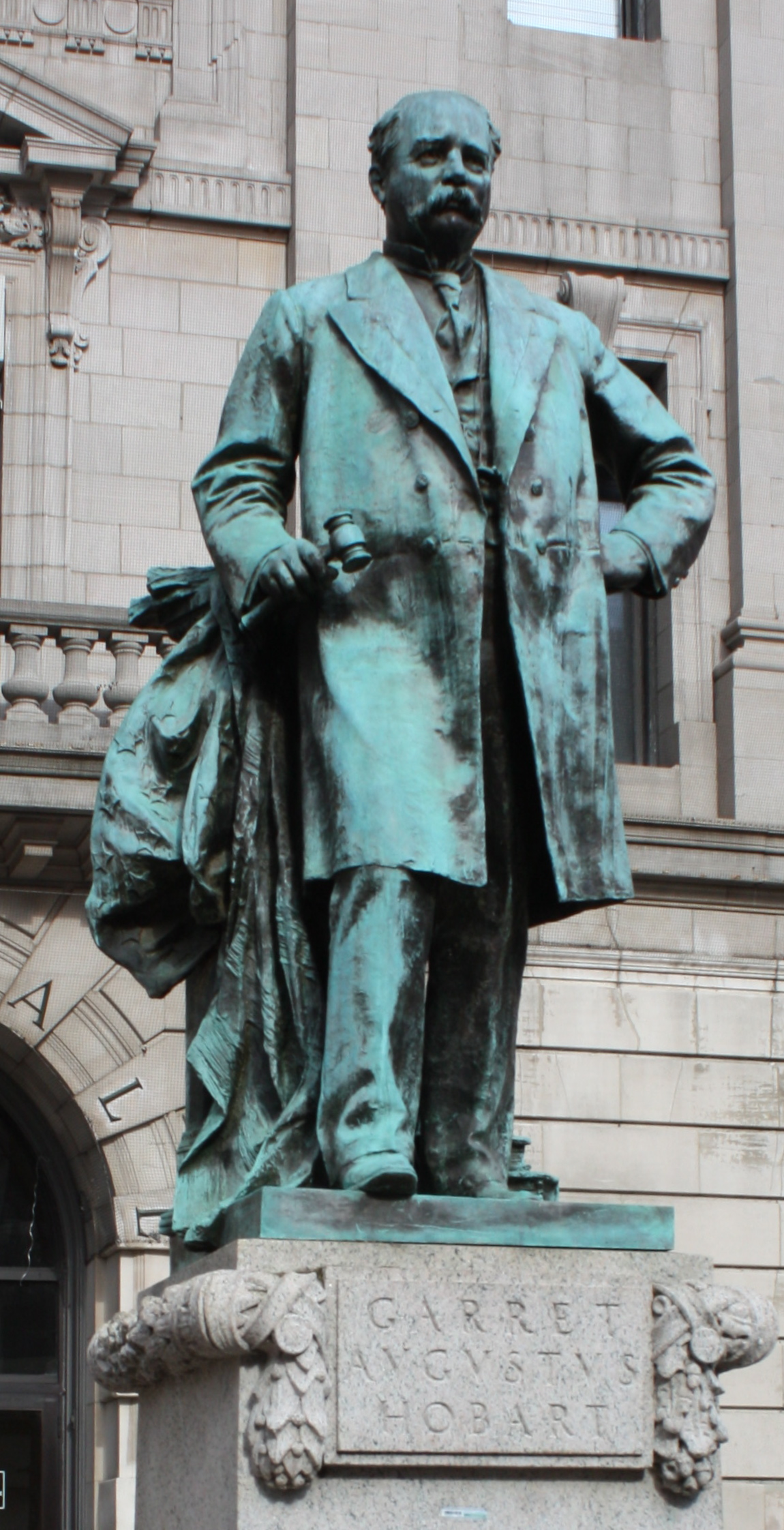
In front of City hall, the statue of Garret Hobart, 24th Vice President of the US, and famous son of Paterson

The building was built in 1896 to commemorate the city's centennial. The building was added to the National Register of Historic Places on March 10, 1995 for its significance in architecture, politics/government, and community planning and development. It was designed by the New York firm Carrere and Hastings in 1894, and is modeled after the Hôtel de Ville (city hall) in Lyon, France, capital of the silk industry in Europe. There are three statues of Paterson political figures outside of the Market Street side of building. One, which is adjacent to the corner of Market Street and Washington Street, honors businessman and philanthropist Nathan Barnert, who was elected twice as mayor. Another, which is adjacent to the corner of Market Street and Colt Street, honors physician Andrew McBride, who was elected a total of three times to the office of mayor. The third, centered in between the two and in front of the entrance to the building, honors former Vice President of the United States Garret Hobart, who took residence in Paterson following his graduation from Rutgers College and became one of its most powerful political leaders before his election as William McKinley's first Vice President.

== See also ==
- National Register of Historic Places listings in Passaic County, New Jersey
- Mayors of Paterson, New Jersey
