= Ryle =

Ryle may refer to:

== People ==
- Ryle Nugent, Sports Presenter
- Alexander Ryle (born 1990), Danish politician
- Anthony Ryle (1927–2016), psychotherapist
- Edward Ryle (1885–1952), British athlete and competitor in the 1908 Summer Olympic Games
- Gerard Ryle (born 1965), Australian journalist
- Gilbert Ryle (1900–1976), English philosopher
- Glenn Ryle (1927–1993), American television personality, in Ohio
- Herbert Edward Ryle (1856–1925), Old Testament scholar in England
- J. C. Ryle (John Charles Ryle, 1816–1900), Anglican bishop of Liverpool
- John Ryle (disambiguation), any of several people
- Martin Ryle (1918–1984), English astronomer
- Mary Danforth Ryle (1833–1904), American philanthropist
- William Ryle (1834–1881), American businessman in the silk industry

== Other uses ==
- Ryle, Kentucky
- Ryle High School
- Ryle Telescope

== See also ==
- Ryles (disambiguation)
