= List of churches in the Diocese of Paterson =

This is a list of current and former Roman Catholic churches in the Roman Catholic Diocese of Paterson. The diocese covers the counties of Passaic, Morris, and Sussex in northern New Jersey.

== Paterson ==
Name	Image	Location	Description/Notes
Cathedral of St. John the Baptist		381 Grand St, Paterson	Listed on the National Register of Historic Places (NRHP)
Our Lady of Lourdes		440 River St, Paterson	
Our Lady of Pompei		70 Murray Ave, Paterson	
Our Lady of Victories		100 Fair St, Paterson	
St. Agnes		681 Main St, Paterson	
St. Anthony of Padua		138 Beech St, Paterson	
St. Bonaventure		174 Ramsey St, Paterson	
St.George Syro Malabar		408 Getty Ave, Paterson	
St. Gerard Majella		501 W Broadway, Paterson	
St. Joseph		399 Market St, Paterson	
St. Michael		74 Cianci St, Paterson	Listed on NRHP
St. Stephen		86 Martin St, Paterson	
St. Therese		80 13th Ave, Paterson	

== Clifton ==
Name	Image	Location	Description/Notes
St. Brendan		154 E 1st St, Clifton	
St. Clare		69 Allwood Rd, Clifton	
Ss. Cyril & Methodius		218 Ackerman Ave, Clifton	
St. Paul		124 Union Ave, Clifton	
St. Philip the Apostle		797 Valley Rd, Clifton	

== Passaic ==
Name	Image	Location	Description/Notes
Holy Trinity		226 Harrison St, Passaic	
Our Lady of Fatima		32 Exchange Pl, Passaic	
Our Lady of Mount Carmel		10 St Francis Way, Passaic	
St. Anthony of Padua		3107, 101-103 Myrtle Ave, Passaic	
St. Joseph		7 Parker Ave, Passaic	
St. Mary's Assumption		63 Monroe St, Passaic	
St. Nicholas		153 Washington Pl, Passaic	Listed on NRHP
St. Stephen		217-221 3rd St, Passaic	

== Other areas ==
Name	Image	Location	Description/Notes
St. Mary's Church		371 South Main Street, Wharton	Listed on the NRHP
Our Lady of Mercy Chapel		100 Whippany Rd, Whippany	Listed on the NRHP
