= Mead–Van Duyne House =

- Van Duyne House
- Formerly listed on the U.S. National Register of Historic Places
- New Jersey Register of Historic Places
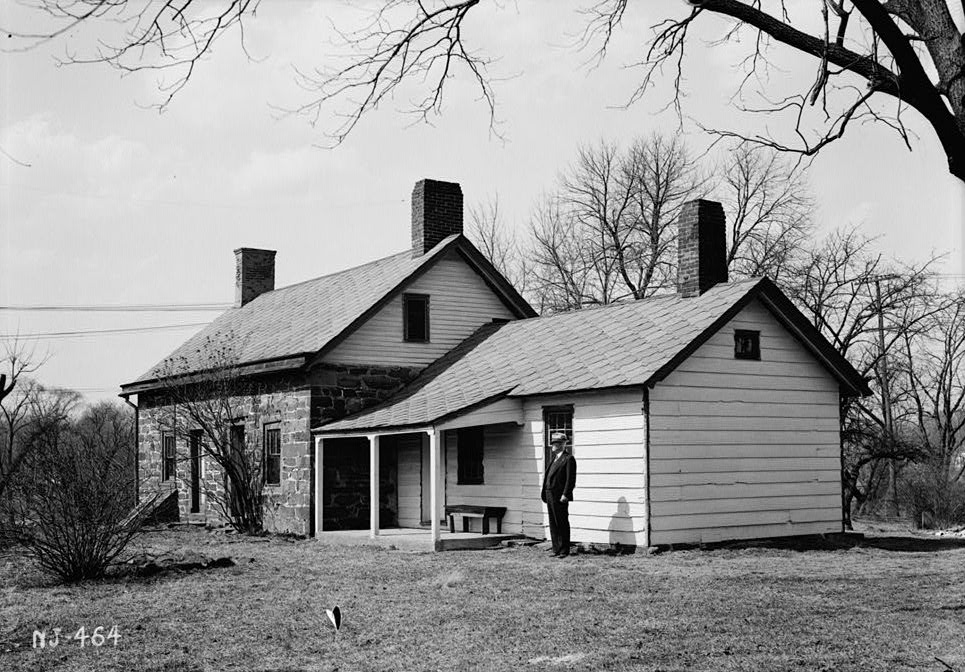
- HABS photo from 1938

- Location within Passaic County, New Jersey Location within New Jersey Location within the United States
- Location: Original: 636 Fairfield Road; Mountain View, New Jersey; Current: 543 Berdan Avenue; Wayne, New Jersey
- Coordinates: 40°58′41″N 74°14′36″W
- Built: 1706
- NRHP reference No.: 71001051
- NJRHP No.: 2417

Significant dates
- Added to NRHP: August 12, 1971
- Designated NJRHP: April 7, 1971; March 15, 1976
- Removed from NRHP: December 15, 1976

The Mead–Van Duyne House is a historic stone house that was originally located at 636 Fairfield Road in the Mountain View section of the township of Wayne in Passaic County, New Jersey. The oldest section of the house dates to 1706. It is the second oldest surviving Dutch stone house in the county. It was documented by the Historic American Buildings Survey in 1938. Listed as the William Klein property, it was added to the National Register of Historic Places on August 12, 1971, for its significance in architecture, military history, and religion/philosophy. In 1974, the building was relocated to 543 Berdan Avenue, next to the Van Riper–Hopper House, as part of the Wayne Museum. It was renominated as the Van Duyne House in 1976. It was relisted on the state register on March 15, 1976. The property was withdrawn from the NRHP on December 15, 1976.

== See also ==
- National Register of Historic Places listings in Passaic County, New Jersey
- List of the oldest buildings in New Jersey
- List of museums in New Jersey
