= St. Nicholas Catholic Church =

St. Nicholas Catholic Church may refer to:

- St. Nicholas Catholic Church (Passaic, New Jersey)
- St. Nicholas Catholic Church (Osgood, Ohio)
- St. Nicholas Catholic Church (Zanesville, Ohio)
