= Old Gun Mill =

Historic mill building in Paterson, New Jersey, U.S.

Coordinates: 40.917898°N 74.178821°W

Old Gun Mill, also referred to as "Colt Gun Mill", is a notable historic mill in Paterson, New Jersey where the Colt revolver was first produced in the 1830s, and where John Ryle produced and manufactured silk for the first time in the United States. As of 2008, the mill is in ruins near the banks of the Passaic Falls in Paterson but efforts to save this historic structure are still being attempted.
