= John and Anna Vreeland House =

Historic house in New Jersey, United States

- U.S. National Register of Historic Places
- New Jersey Register of Historic Places
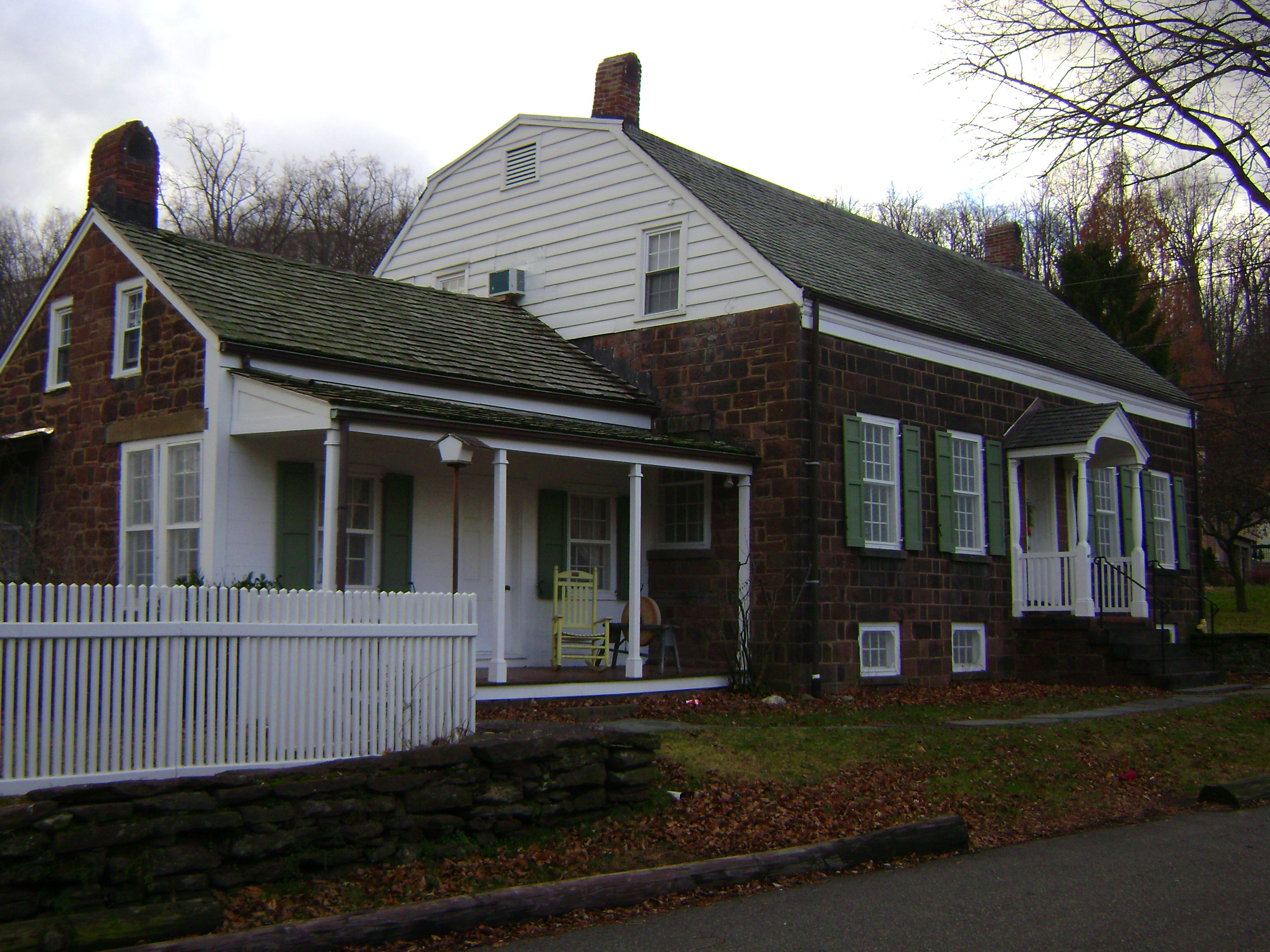
- Vreeland House seen on December 23, 2011.

- Location within Passaic County, New Jersey Location within New Jersey Location within the United States
- Location: 971 Valley Road, Clifton, New Jersey
- Coordinates: 40°52′5″N 74°11′28″W
- Area: 2.5 acres (1.0 ha)
- Built: c. 1817
- Architect: Anna and John Vreeland
- Architectural style: Mixed (more Than 2 Styles From Different Periods)
- NRHP reference No.: 82003300
- NJRHP No.: 2332

Significant dates
- Added to NRHP: May 13, 1982
- Designated NJRHP: February 22, 1982

John and Anna Vreeland House, also known as the Hamilton House, is located at 971 Valley Road in the city of Clifton in Passaic County, New Jersey, United States. The farmhouse, built c. 1817 by Anna and John Vreeland, is one of the last symbols of Dutch settlement in the city and one of the finest examples of early 19th century stone houses in the county according to the nomination form. It was added to the National Register of Historic Places on May 13, 1982, for its significance in architecture. It is now operated by the city as a house museum, the Hamilton–Van Wagoner House Museum.

== History and description ==
Gerrit Van Wagoner is the first known owner of the property. It was eventually inherited by Anna Vreeland, who built the farmhouse c. 1817 at the time of her marriage to John. The house is a one and one-half story sandstone building with a gambrel roof. They sold it to Van Ripers family in 1837. Henry Hamilton, a dairy farmer, purchased it in 1856. The house was owned by the Hamilton family until 1972, when it was bought by the city. It was originally located about 1,000 feet (300 m) north on the opposite side of Valley Road from its current location. In 1973, it was moved to avoid being demolished.

== See also ==
- National Register of Historic Places listings in Passaic County, New Jersey
- List of museums in New Jersey
