= Daniel Thompson and John Ryle Houses =

Historic house in New Jersey, United States

- U.S. National Register of Historic Places
- New Jersey Register of Historic Places
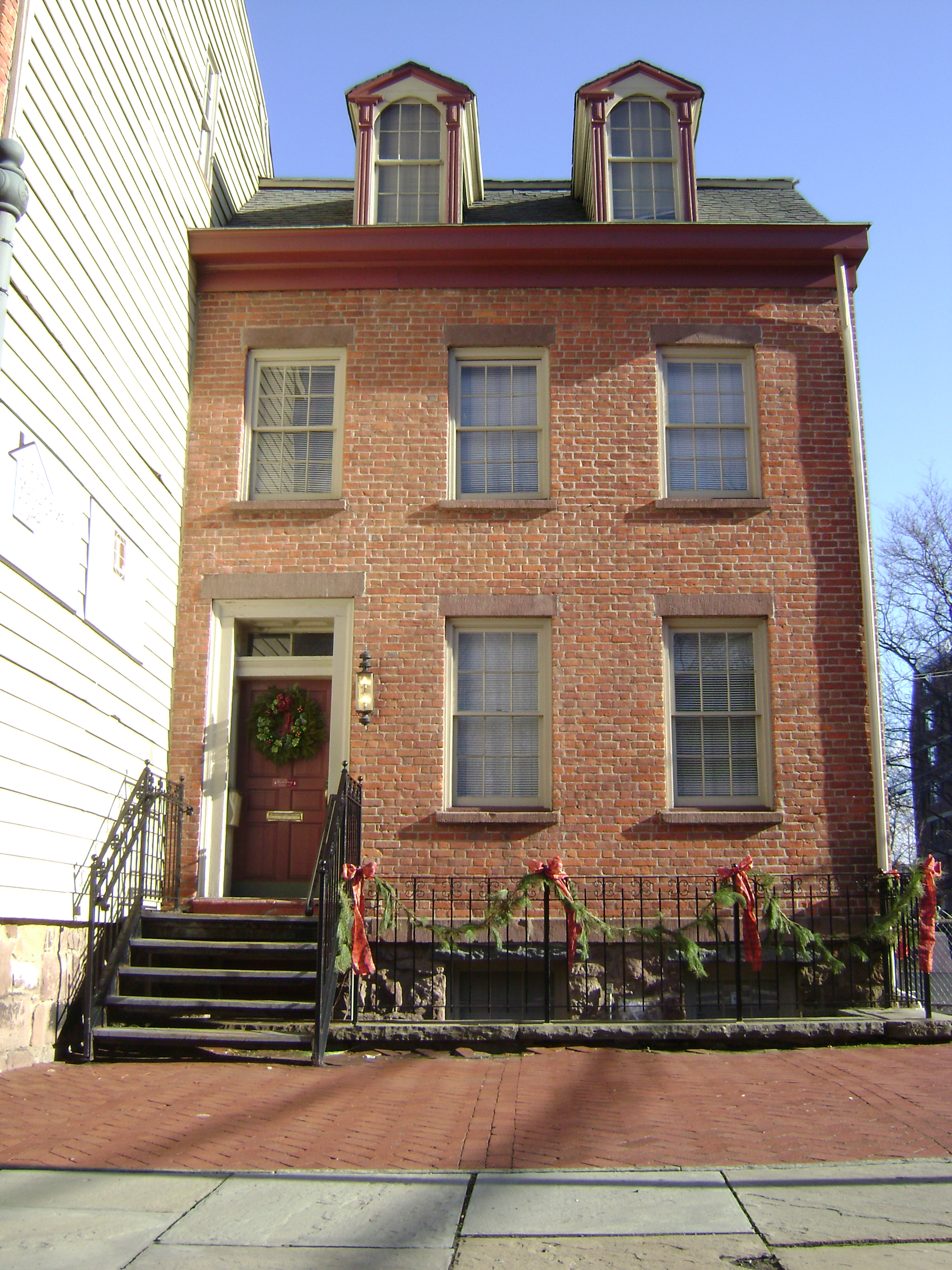
- The southern of the two conjoined houses, seen in late December, 2011.

- Location within Passaic County, New Jersey Location within New Jersey Location within the United States
- Location: 8 and 9 Mill Street, Paterson, New Jersey
- Coordinates: 40°54′59″N 74°10′42″W
- Area: 0.5 acres (0.20 ha)
- Built: 1830
- Architectural style: Federal
- NRHP reference No.: 81000398
- NJRHP No.: 2400

Significant dates
- Added to NRHP: July 30, 1981
- Designated NJRHP: June 17, 1981

The Daniel Thompson and John Ryle Houses are located in Paterson, Passaic County, New Jersey, United States. The houses were built in 1830 and were added to the National Register of Historic Places on July 30, 1981.

== See also ==
- National Register of Historic Places listings in Passaic County, New Jersey
