= Ailsa Farms =

Historic house in New Jersey, United States

- U.S. National Register of Historic Places
- New Jersey Register of Historic Places
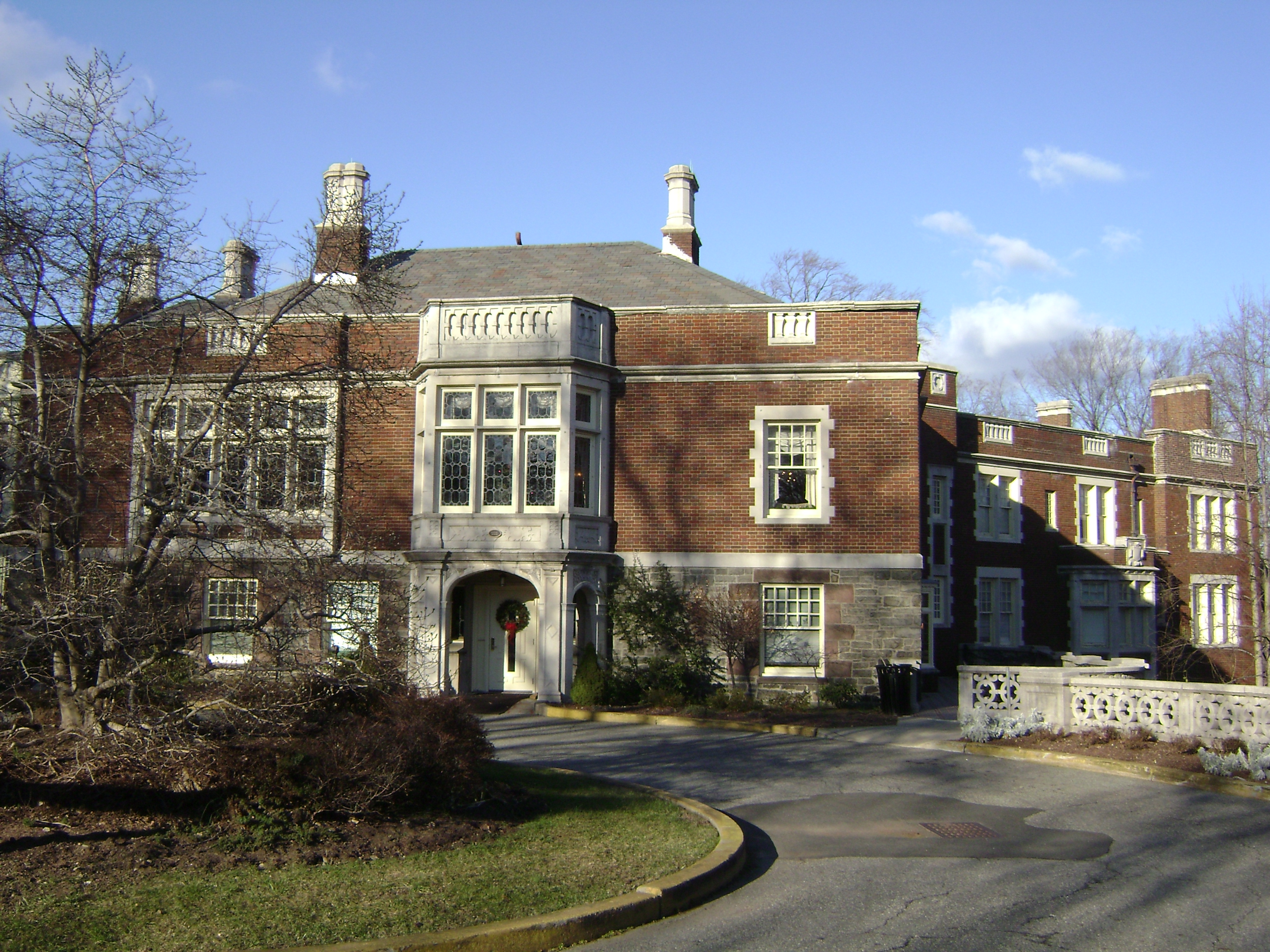
- Hobart Manor (Haledon Hall), the centerpiece of the former Ailsa Farms estate, seen in December, 2011.

- Location within Passaic County, New Jersey Location within New Jersey Location within the United States
- Location: 300 Pompton Road, Wayne, New Jersey
- Coordinates: 40°56′37″N 74°11′50″W
- Built: 1877
- Architect: John MacCullough
- NRHP reference No.: 76001181
- NJRHP No.: 2411

Significant dates
- Added to NRHP: April 30, 1976
- Designated NJRHP: November 20, 1975

Ailsa Farms, also known as Haledon Hall and Hobart Manor, is a historic house located at 300 Pompton Road in the township of Wayne in Passaic County, New Jersey, United States. It was purchased by the state of New Jersey in 1948 from the family of Garret Hobart, 24th vice president of the United States and is now located on the campus of William Paterson University. Ailsa Farms was added to the National Register of Historic Places on April 30, 1976, for its significance in architecture, politics, and social history.

== History and description ==
In 1877, Scottish immigrant John MacCullough, a wealthy wool-industry businessman, built a two-story fieldstone house in the manor of a castle, with two octagonal turrets. In 1902, it was purchased by Jennie Tuttle Hobart, widow of the former vice president Garret Hobart and became the weekend retreat and summer residence of the family. In 1915, their son Garret Hobart Jr. added a three-story brick wing, designed by Paterson architects Fred Wesley Wentworth and Frederick Vreeland. In 1948, the state acquired the property for use as the Paterson State Teachers College, now William Paterson University. Today the building is known as Hobart Manor and houses the university's Office of the President and Office of Institutional Advancement.

== See also ==
- National Register of Historic Places listings in Passaic County, New Jersey
