= Mary Danforth Ryle =

Mary Danforth Ryle (8 January 1833 – December 21, 1904) was an American philanthropist.

== Biography ==
She was born in Paterson, New Jersey, on 8 January 1833, the daughter of Charles Danforth, the designer and manufacturer of the first coal-burning locomotive engine. A veteran of the War of 1812, Charles Danforth was also known for his patented invention, that of the Danforth Spindle, a cotton spinning frame.

Mary Danforth married William Ryle of Macclesfield, Cheshire, England, reputed to be the largest and wealthiest silk importer in the United States. William Ryle was the nephew of John Ryle, the "Father of the U.S. Silk Industry" in Paterson.

Throughout her life, Mary Danforth Ryle was always philanthropic. After her father's death, she donated the residence of her father to the city of Paterson to be used as the city's first library. She provided the funds to alter, furnish and equip the new institution. After the catastrophic fire of 1902, in which much of downtown Paterson was destroyed, including the Danforth Library, Ryle once again donated the funds necessary to build the new Danforth Memorial Library located on Broadway in Paterson. Ryle contracted with Henry Bacon, who designed the Lincoln Memorial to build the new city library. The Danforth Memorial Library is perhaps the most notable and beautiful public buildings in the city of Paterson, New Jersey.

She died on December 21, 1904.

Mary Danforth Ryle was so loved by the citizens of Paterson that at the time of her death, the funeral was one of the largest the city had ever seen. Mrs. Ryle was buried at Cedar Lawn Cemetery in Paterson.
