= St. Mary's Church (Wharton, New Jersey) =

Historic church in Morris County, New Jersey

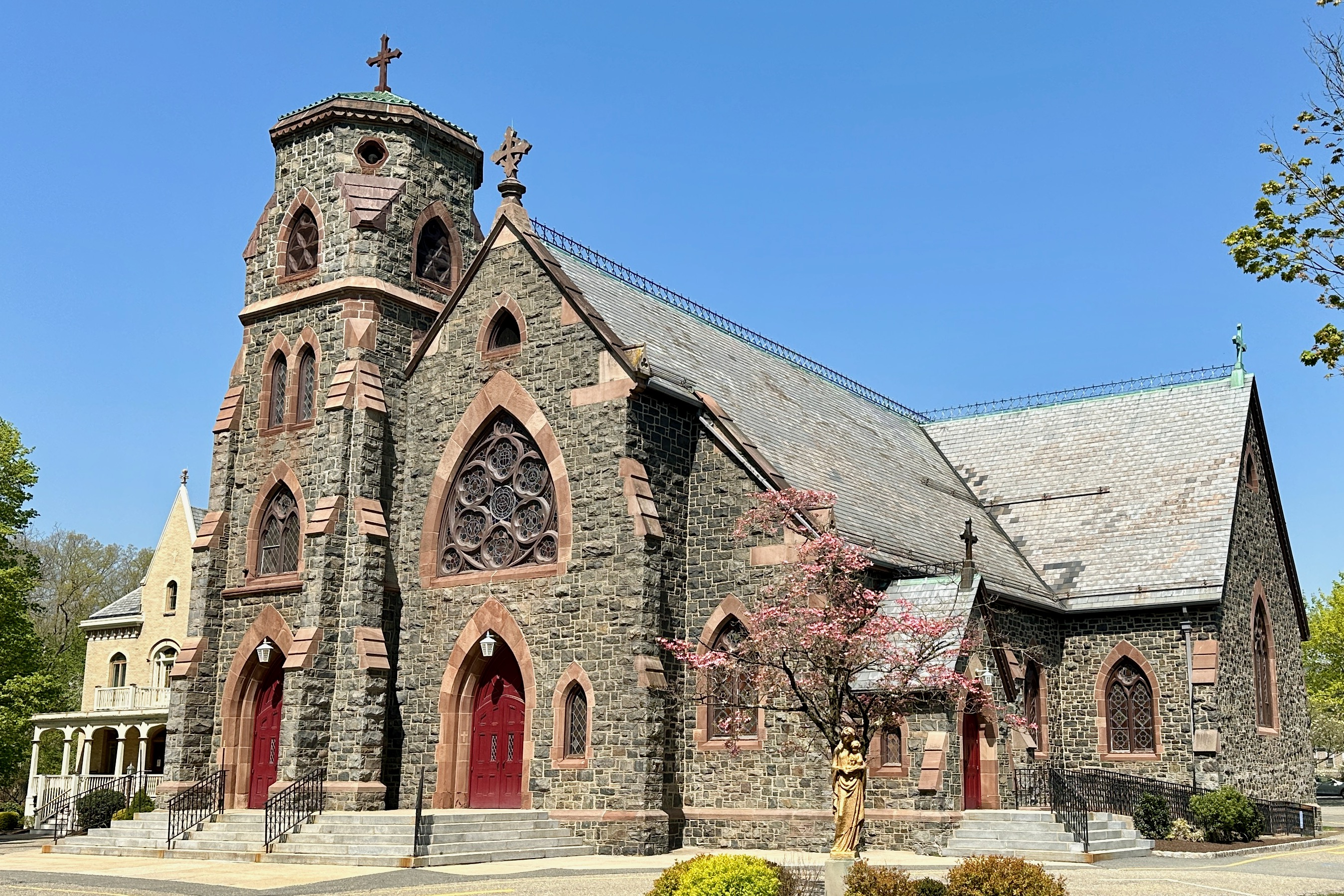
- Saint Mary's Church at Wharton, New Jersey
- St. Mary's Church
- 40°53′11.7″N 74°34′44.9″W
- Location: 371 South Main Street, Wharton, New Jersey
- Country: United States
- Denomination: Roman Catholic

History
- Founded: 1845
- Dedicated: November 1, 1873

Architecture
- Architect: Jeremiah O'Rourke
- Architectural type: Gothic Revival, High Victorian Gothic

Administration
- Province: Newark
- Diocese: Paterson

New Jersey Register of Historic Places
- Designated: May 21, 1997
- Reference no.: 57

St. Mary's Church is a historic Roman Catholic parish church located at 371 South Main Street in the borough of Wharton in Morris County, New Jersey, United States. The parish was founded in 1845 and serves the communities of Wharton, Dover, and Mine Hill Township. It is part of the Diocese of Paterson. The Gothic Revival stone church was designed by architect Jeremiah O'Rourke and built from 1872 to 1873. Listed as Saint Mary's Roman Catholic Church, it was added to the New Jersey Register of Historic Places in 1997. The church buildings and grounds were added to the National Register of Historic Places in 2023.

== History ==
In 1845, St. Mary's became the first Roman Catholic parish established in the northwestern section of the county. The area had several iron mines, access to coal and markets via the Morris Canal and later the Morris and Essex Railroad, and an extensive iron industry. The iron mining attracted immigrants from Ireland, many of whom were Catholic and needed a church closer than Madison, over 15 miles (24 km) away. Father Louis Dominic Senez, from St. Vincent Martyr in Madison, having served the Dover area since 1844, decided that it needed its own parish. The first church, a wooden building with Greek Revival style, was built 1845–1846 and located across U.S. Route 46 from the current church.

After the end of the American Civil War, there was an increase in mining activity and employment in the area. In 1868, the parish purchased 19 acres (7.7 ha) where the current church is located. Father Pierce McCarthy, recognizing that the congregation needed a larger church, organized efforts to build a new one. Irish-American architect Jeremiah O'Rourke designed the new church, having already designed several for the Diocese of Newark. The cornerstone was blessed on Ascension Day, May 9, 1872, and the completed church dedicated on All Saints' Day, November 1, 1873.

On January 16, 2021, Father Lemmuel Camacho was installed as pastor.

== Description ==
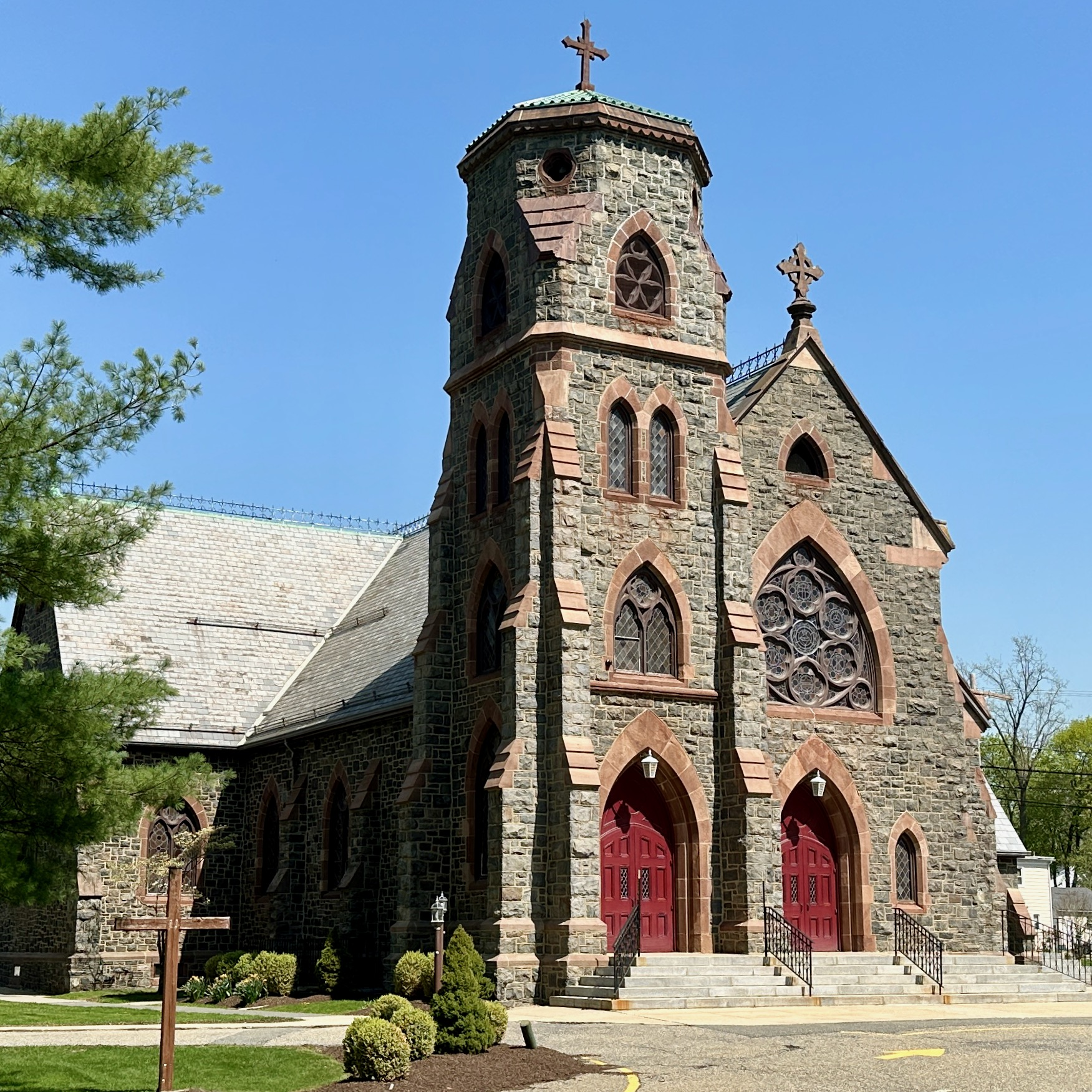
St. Mary's Church, after restoration

Architect O'Rourke designed the church using Gothic Revival and High Victorian Gothic styles. He was influenced by the works of the English designer A. Welby Pugin and the Decorated Gothic style. Parishioners collected the stones used to build the church from the iron mines where they worked. According to historian Brian Regan:

"Parishioners transported the stones from the dark and filthy mines where they toiled. Those stones were transfigured into the building fabric of a beautiful place illuminated by light filtered through shimmering stained-glass windows. What's more, those stones held the iron ore that parishioners extracted from local mines and which was the prime economic driver of the entire region in the nineteenth century. These extraordinary circumstances imbue St. Mary's Church with a deep and arresting symbolism."

The rough-cut building stones are hard metamorphic rock with a bluish gray color. Red sandstone was used for the trim. The windows have decorated tracery. The interior features an open timber roof and stained glass windows.

In 1997, the parish received funding from the New Jersey Historic Trust to assist in restoring and conserving the exterior of the historic church based on the architect's original plans.

== Historic district ==
- St. Mary's Church Historic District
- U.S. National Register of Historic Places
- U.S. Historic district
- New Jersey Register of Historic Places
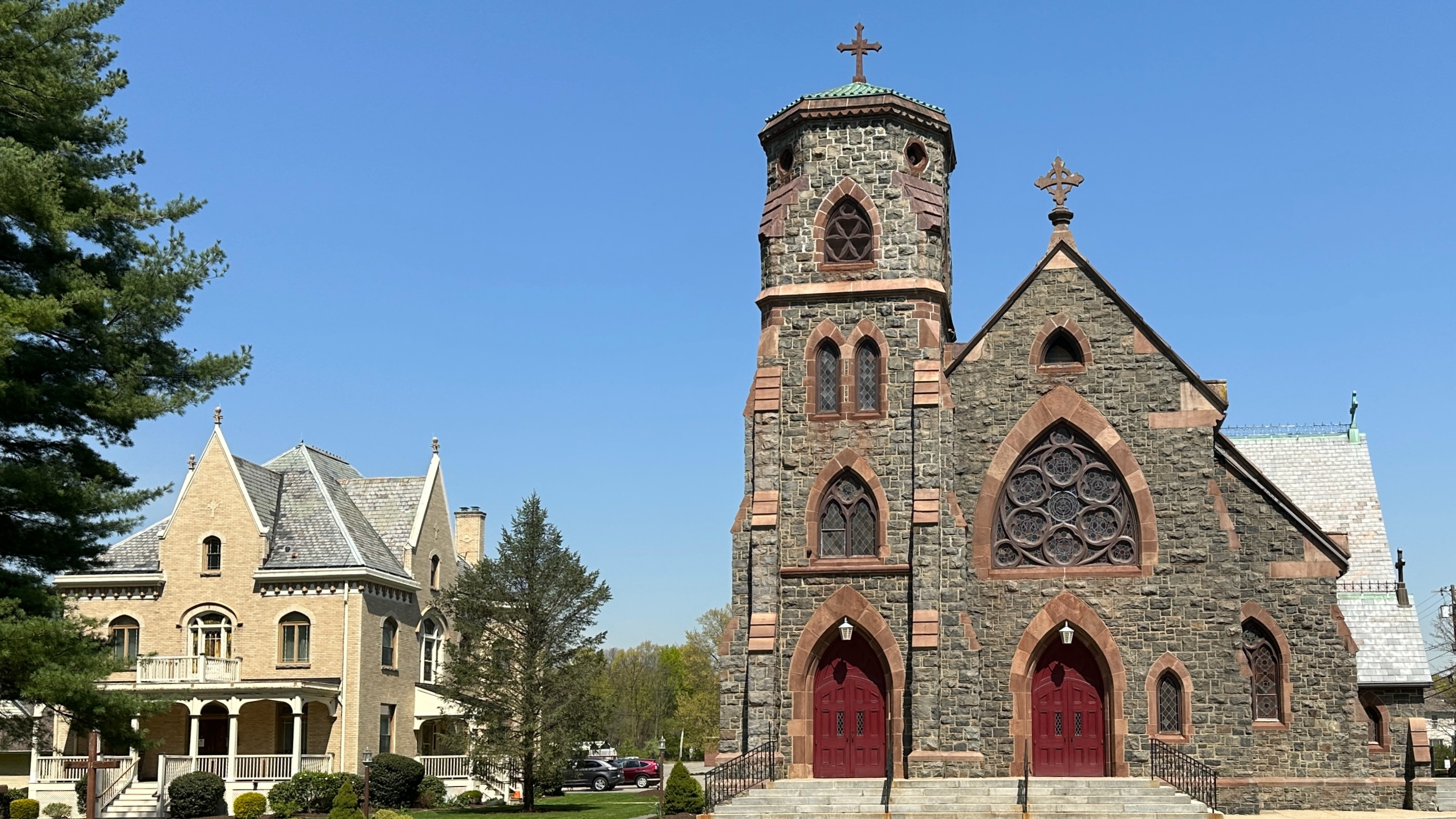
- St. Mary's Church and Rectory
- Location: South Main Street bounded by U.S. Route 46 and St. Mary's Street, Wharton, New Jersey
- Area: 16 acres (6.5 ha)
- NRHP reference No.: 100008766
- NJRHP No.: 5916

Significant dates
- Added to NRHP: April 3, 2023
- Designated NJRHP: February 14, 2023

St. Mary's Church Historic District is a 16-acre (6.5 ha) historic district encompassing the church buildings and grounds along County Route 634 (South Main Street) bounded by U.S. Route 46 (West Blackwell Street) and St. Mary's Street in the borough of Wharton. It was added to the National Register of Historic Places on April 3, 2023, for its significance in art and architecture. The district includes six contributing buildings, featuring the church and rectory, and one contributing site, the church grove, featuring the Spring Brook. The two and one-half story rectory was built in 1899 and designed by architects Benjamin J. Schweitzer and Julius J. Diemer with Châteauesque architectural style. The parish purchased land for the church grove in 1868. According to the registration form, it adds a "picturesque, Romantic ethos and feeling" to the grounds. The district also includes a convent (built in 1915), school (1954–1955), sister's house (1881), and barn (1868). The convent is now a multipurpose facility. The sister's house is now known as the Religious Education Center.

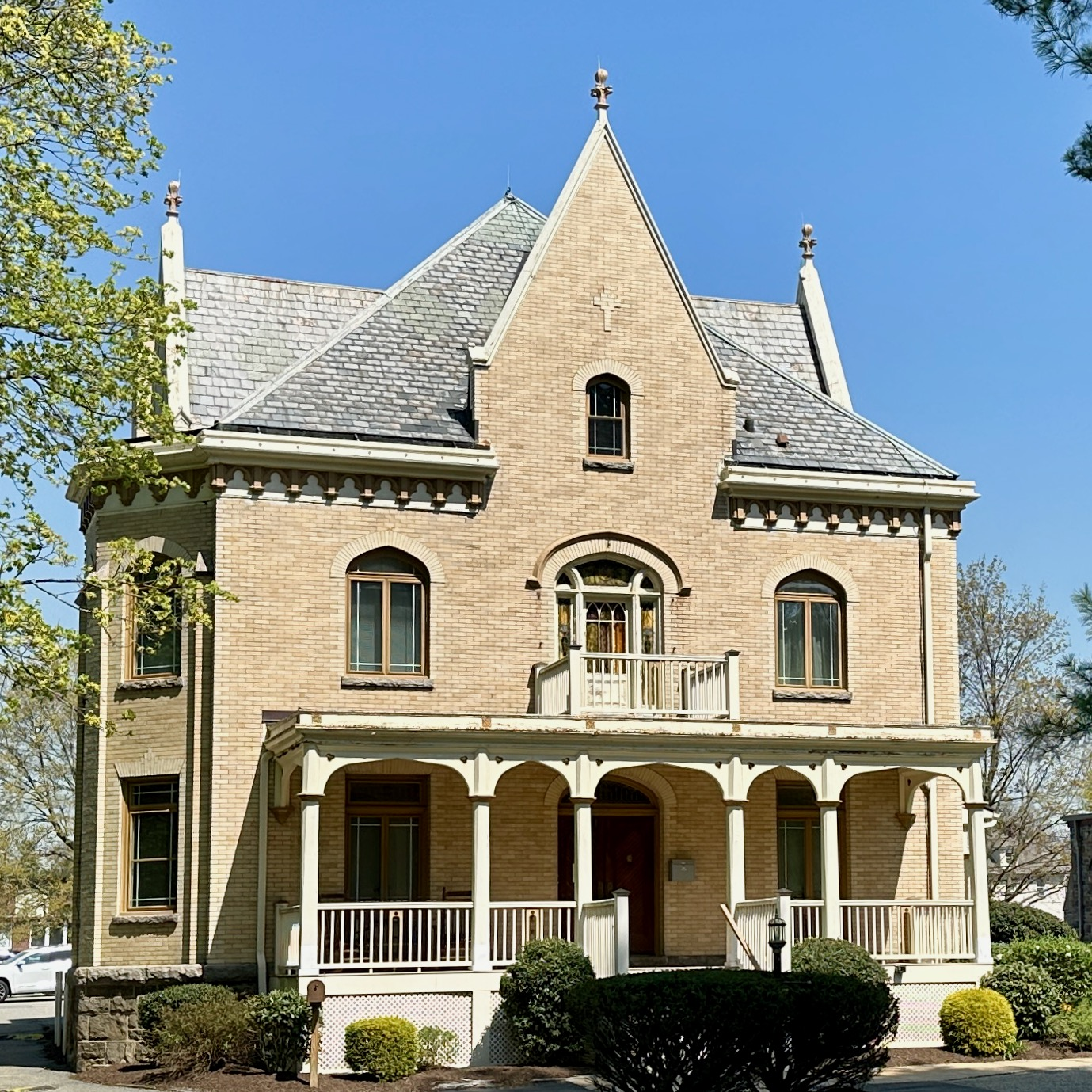
St. Mary's Rectory

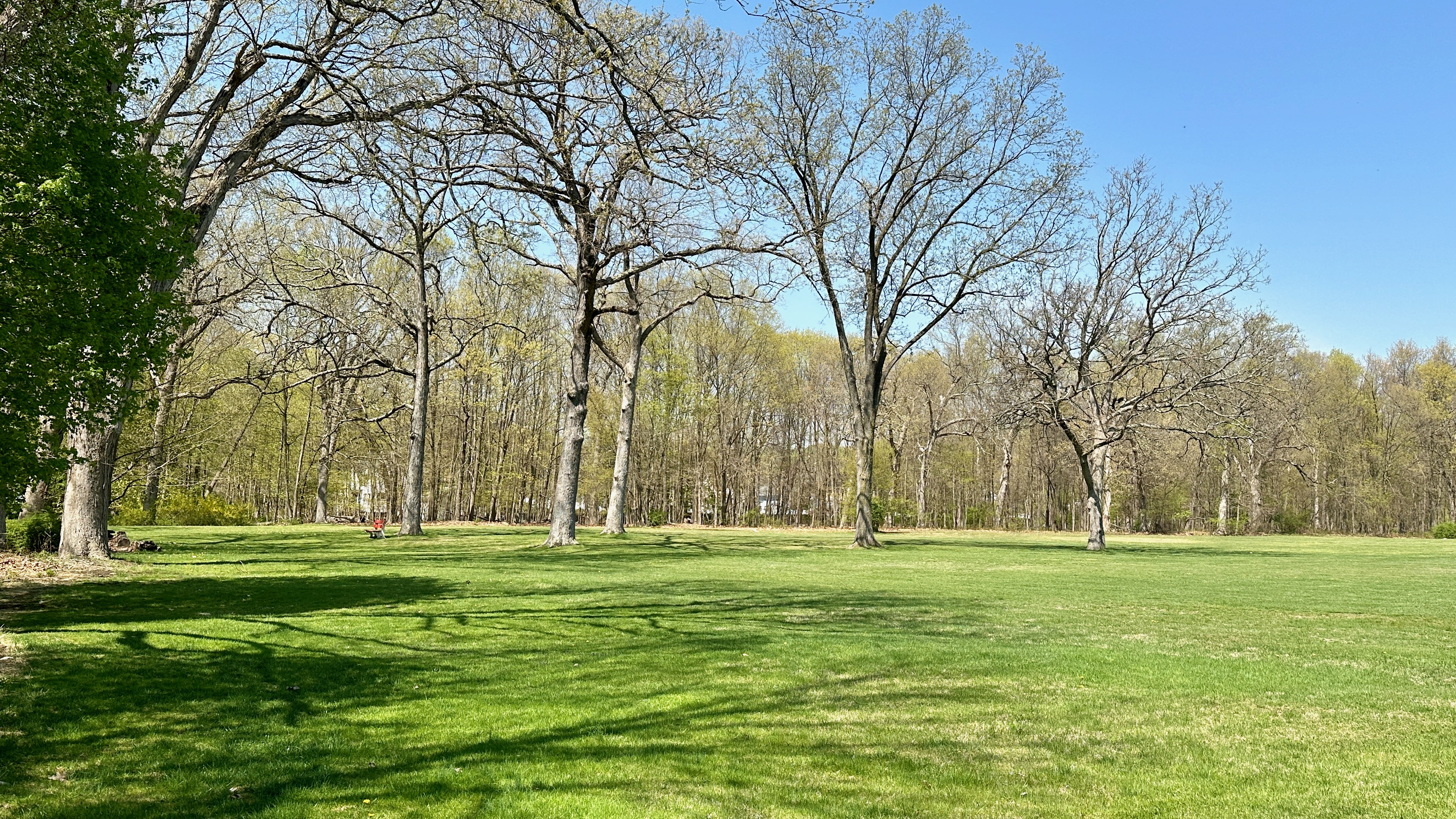
St. Mary's Grove

== Cemetery ==
St. Mary's Cemetery is located nearby on Hurd Street in Mine Hill Township and extending into the town of Dover. It was established in 1874, and extended in 1903. The churchyard from the first church is also located in Mine Hill Township, across U.S. Route 46 from the current church in Wharton. It was established by Father Senez in 1846.

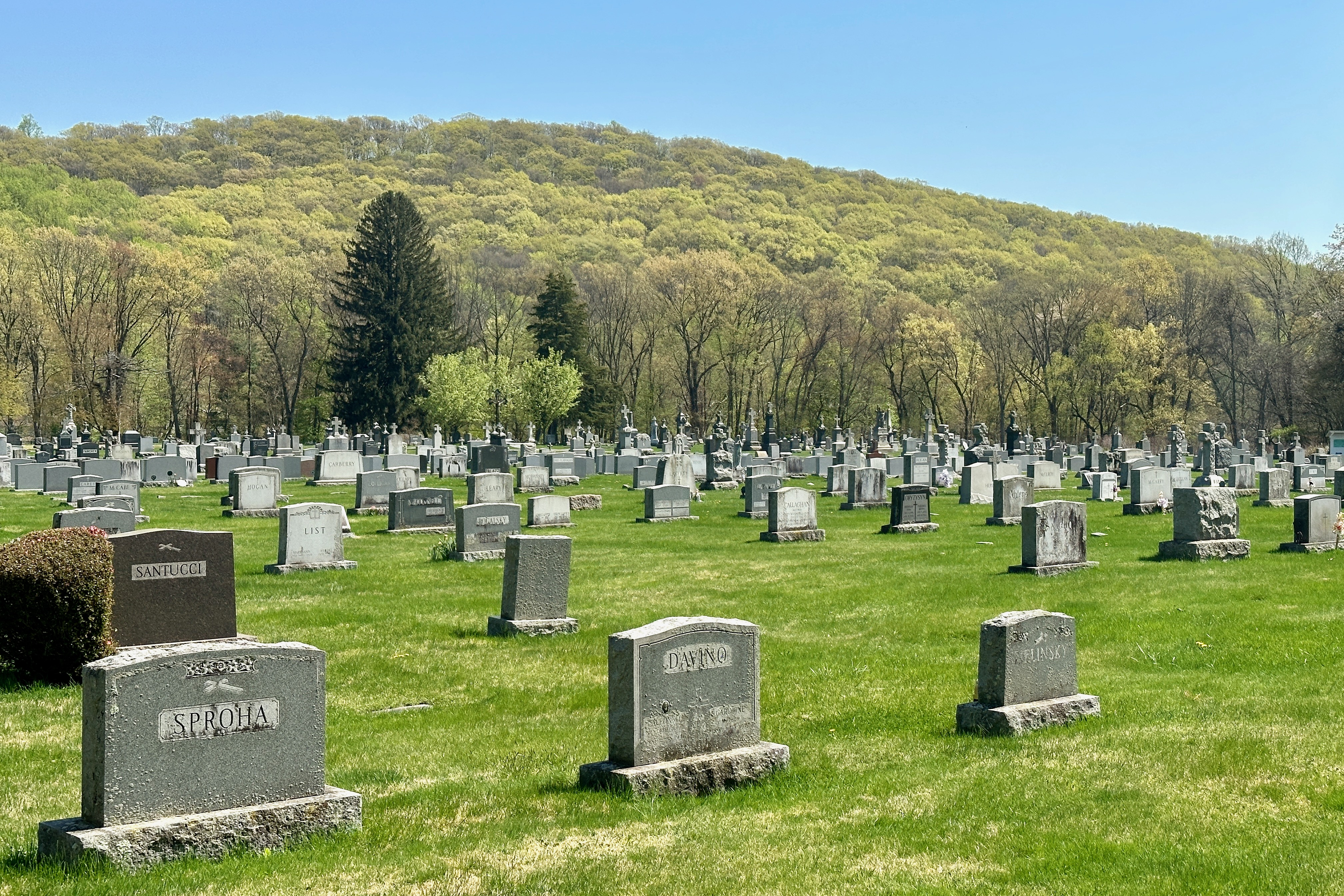
St. Mary's Cemetery

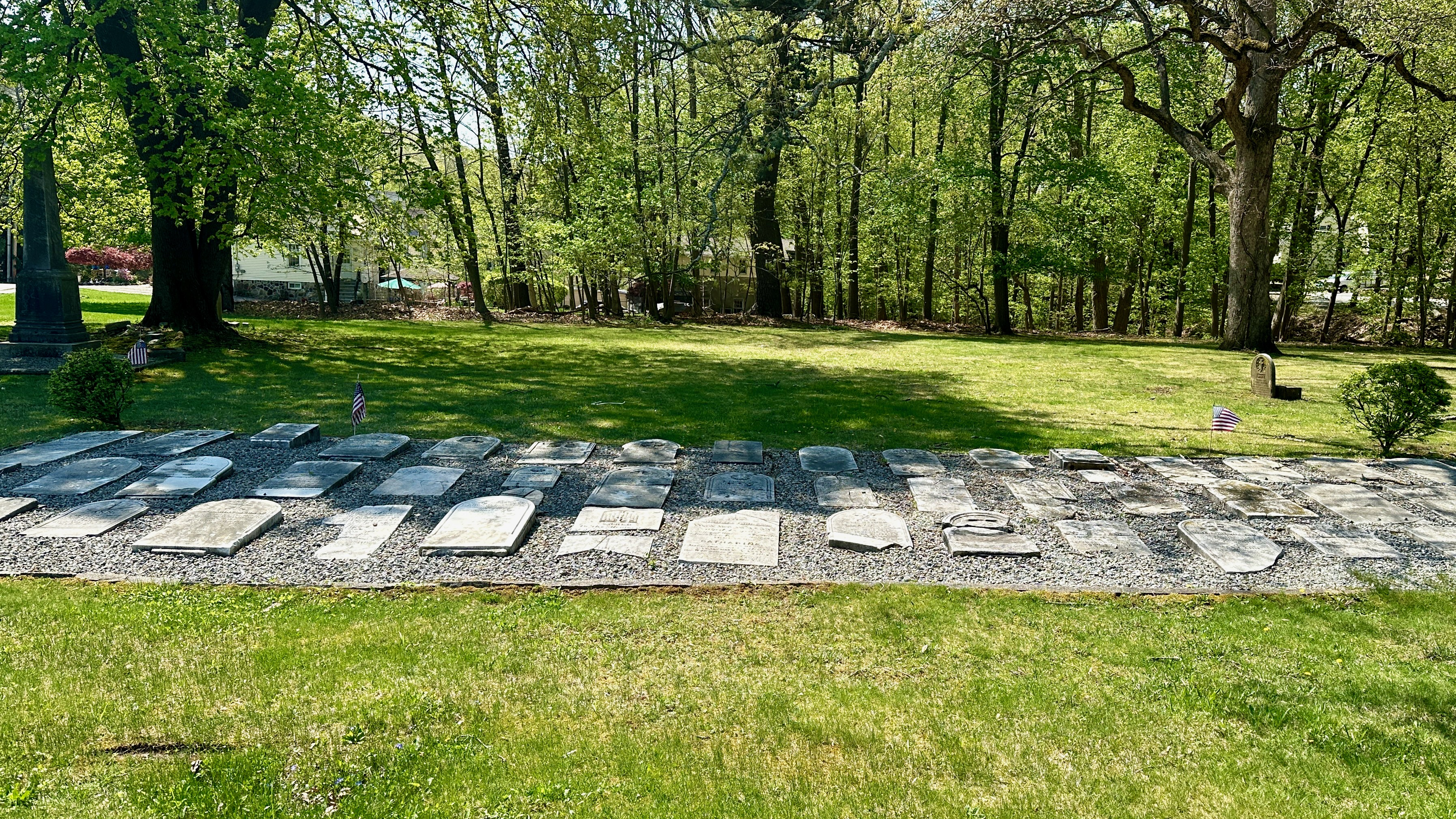
Churchyard of first St. Mary's Church

== See also ==
- List of churches in the Roman Catholic Diocese of Paterson
- National Register of Historic Places listings in Morris County, New Jersey
