= St. John's Evangelical Lutheran Church (Passaic, New Jersey) =

Historic church in New Jersey, U.S.

- U.S. National Register of Historic Places
- New Jersey Register of Historic Places
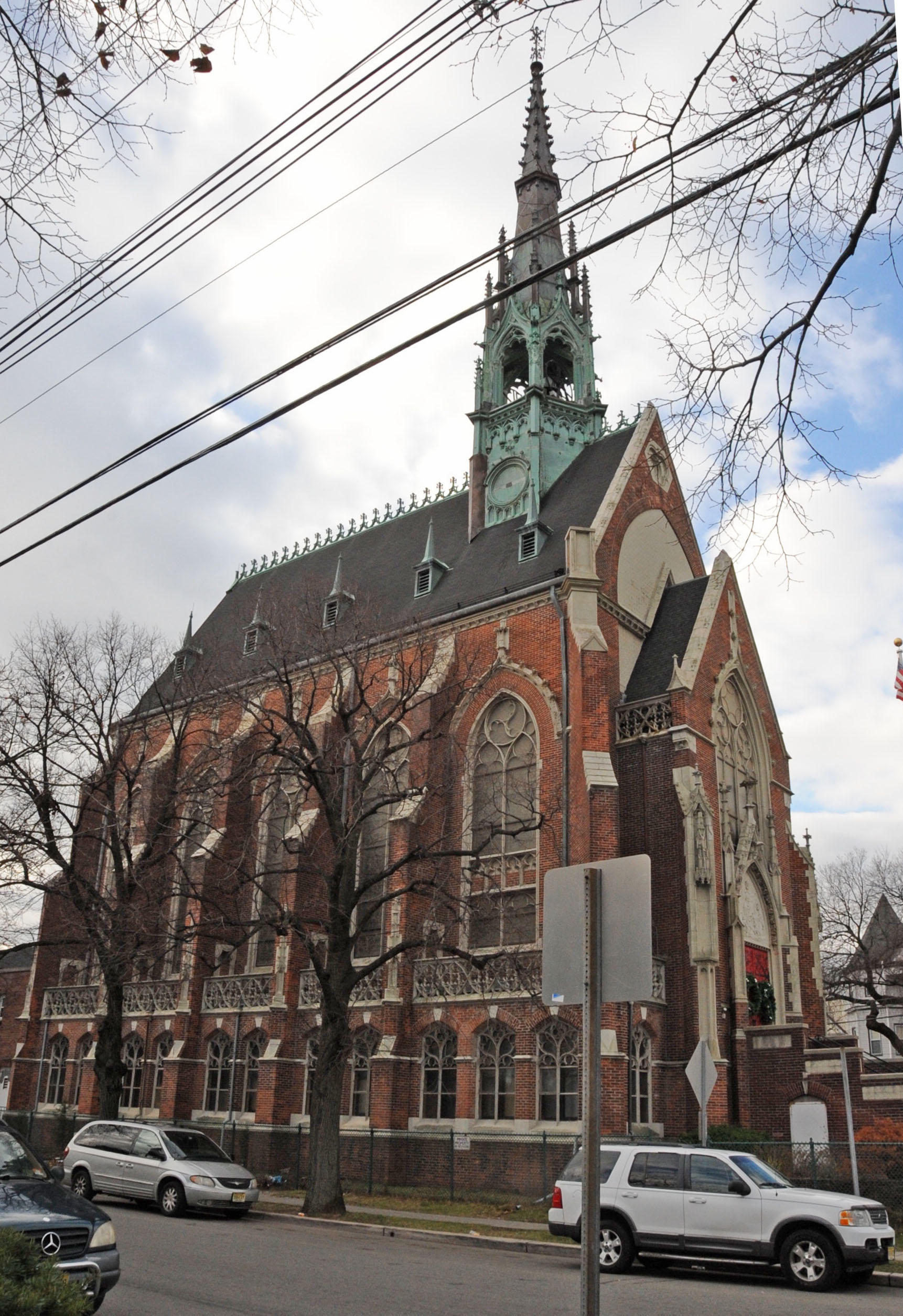

- Location within Passaic County, New Jersey Location within New Jersey Location within the United States
- Location: 140 Lexington Avenue, Passaic, New Jersey
- Coordinates: 40°52′4″N 74°7′38″W
- Built: 1896–1897
- Architect: Ludwig Becker
- Architectural style: High Victorian German
- NRHP reference No.: 82003301
- NJRHP No.: 2353

Significant dates
- Added to NRHP: May 7, 1982
- Designated NJRHP: September 3, 1981

St. John's Evangelical Lutheran Church, also known as St. John Lutheran Church, is a congregation of the Evangelical Lutheran Church in America in the city of Passaic in Passaic County, New Jersey, United States. It is noted for its historic church located at 140 Lexington Avenue, which was built from 1896 to 1897 and was added to the National Register of Historic Places on May 7, 1982, for its significance in architecture, education, and religion.

== History and description ==
St. John's was founded by German immigrants in 1891. The congregation met first at the Grand Army Hall, and later at Reisel's hall, and as membership grew rapidly, land was secured and a design developed by Ludwig Becker and executed by Ludwig Kick.

== See also ==
- National Register of Historic Places listings in Passaic County, New Jersey
