= Frederick William Cooke Residence =

- U.S. National Register of Historic Places
- New Jersey Register of Historic Places
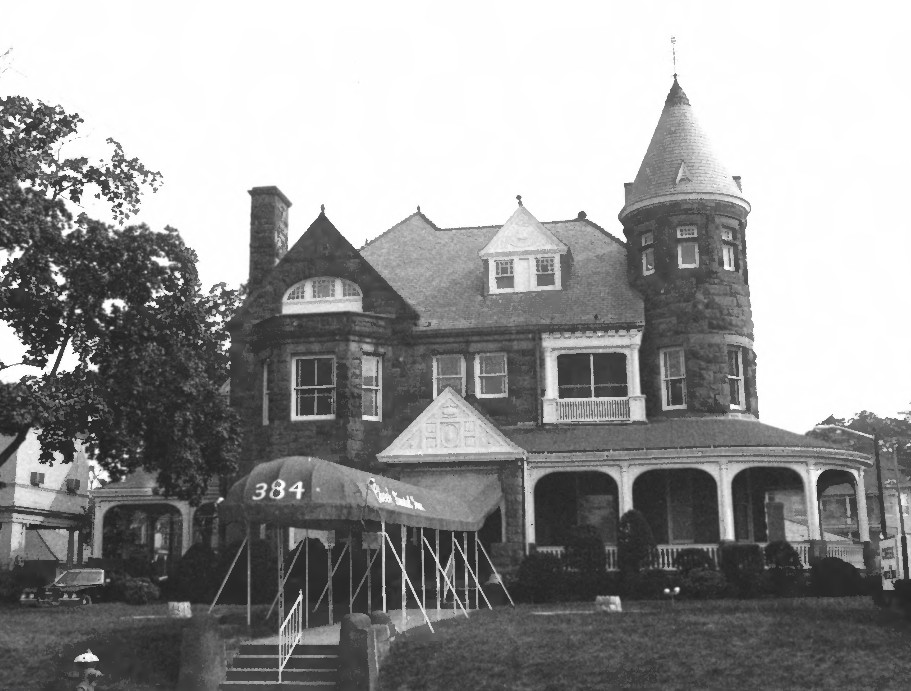

- Location within Passaic County, New Jersey Location within New Jersey Location within the United States
- Location: 384 Broadway, Paterson, New Jersey
- Coordinates: 40°55′06″N 74°09′31″W
- Built: 1883
- Architectural style: Queen Anne, Romanesque, Richardsonian Romanesque
- NRHP reference No.: 82003302
- NJRHP No.: 2370

Significant dates
- Added to NRHP: July 8, 1982
- Designated NJRHP: December 23, 1981

The Frederick William Cooke Residence was a historic building built 1883–1886 and located at 384 Broadway in the city of Paterson in Passaic County, New Jersey. Also known as the Cooke Mansion, it was added to the National Register of Historic Places on July 8, 1982, for its significance in architecture, industry, and transportation. It was destroyed by fire in 1991.

== History and description ==
Frederick William Cooke started construction of the house c. 1883, when he became an executive at Cooke Locomotive and Machine Works in Paterson. The brownstone house featured Queen Anne and Richardsonian Romanesque styles.

== See also ==
- National Register of Historic Places listings in Passaic County, New Jersey
