= John Ryle =

John Ryle may refer to:

- John Ryle (fl. 1414), Member of Parliament for Lincoln in 1414
- John Ryle (politician) (1781–1862), Member of Parliament for Macclesfield from 1832 to 1837
- J. C. Ryle (John Charles Ryle, 1816–1900), Anglican bishop of Liverpool
- John Ryle (manufacturer) (1817–1887), British and American businessman in the silk industry
- John Ryle (professor) (1889–1950), British medical professor
- John Ryle (writer) (born 1952), British author and anthropologist
