= Passaic Elks Club =

- U.S. National Register of Historic Places
- New Jersey Register of Historic Places
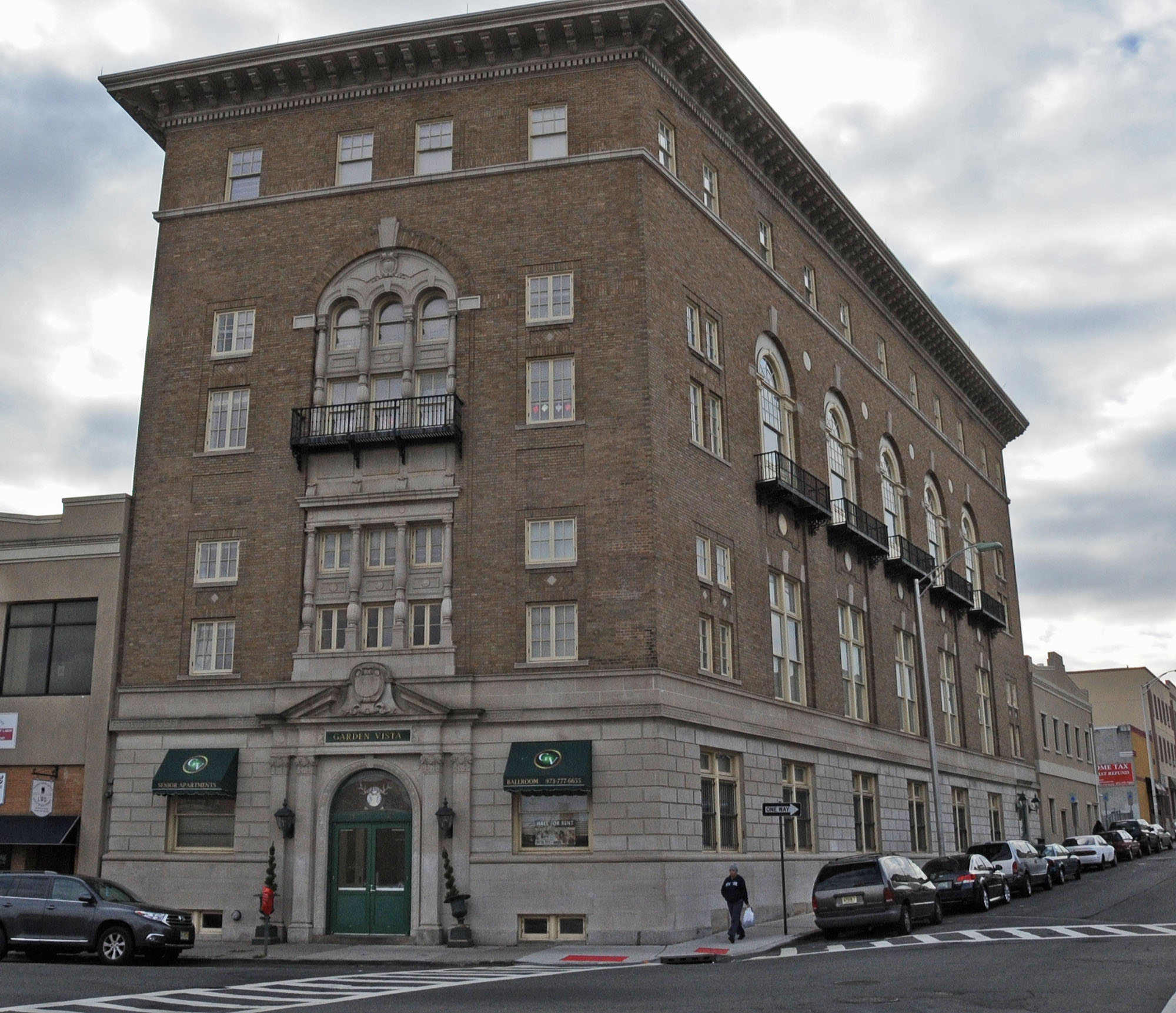

- Location within Passaic County, New Jersey Location within New Jersey Location within the United States
- Location: 29-31 Howe Avenue, Passaic, New Jersey
- Coordinates: 40°51′39″N 74°7′40″W
- Area: less than one acre
- Built: 1924
- Architect: Kelly, John F.
- Architectural style: Italian Renaissance Revival
- NRHP reference No.: 05001485
- NJRHP No.: 4564

Significant dates
- Added to NRHP: December 28, 2005
- Designated NJRHP: September 21, 2005

Passaic Elks Club is located in Passaic, Passaic County, New Jersey, United States. The building was built in the Italian Renaissance Revival style in 1924.

The Elks Club structure was added to the National Register of Historic Places on December 28, 2005.

== See also ==
- National Register of Historic Places listings in Passaic County, New Jersey
