= Public School Number Two =

- U.S. National Register of Historic Places
- New Jersey Register of Historic Places
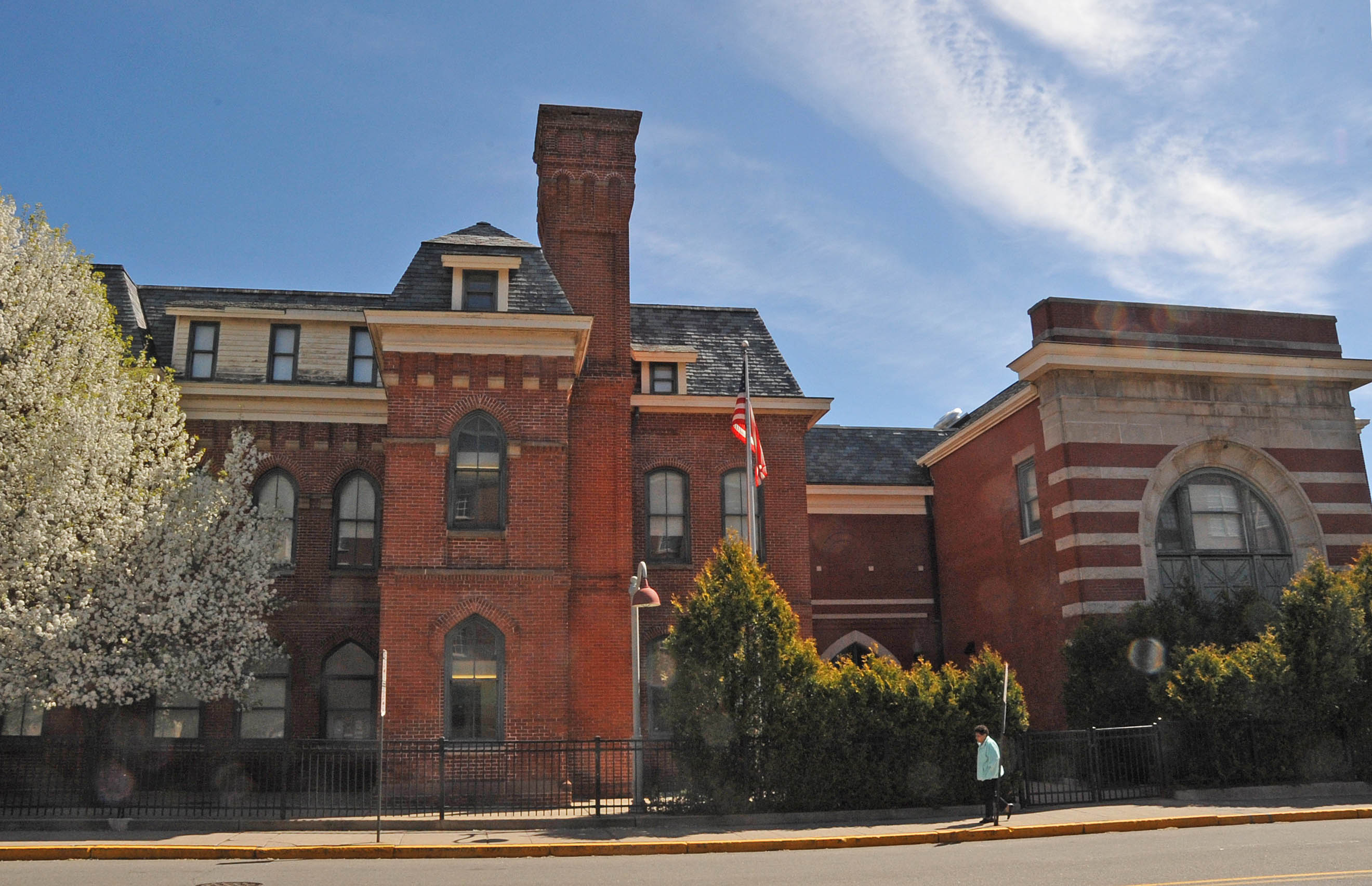

- Location within Passaic County, New Jersey Location within New Jersey Location within the United States
- Location: Mill and Passaic Streets, Paterson, New Jersey
- Coordinates: 40°54′55″N 74°10′38″W
- Area: 0.1 acres (0.040 ha)
- Built: 1871
- Architect: Derrick, E.J.M.
- Architectural style: Gothic
- NRHP reference No.: 78001790
- NJRHP No.: 2391

Significant dates
- Added to NRHP: March 8, 1978
- Designated NJRHP: October 28, 1977

Public School Number Two is located in Paterson, Passaic County, New Jersey, United States. The building was added to the National Register of Historic Places on March 8, 1978.

== See also ==
- National Register of Historic Places listings in Passaic County, New Jersey
