= Van Houten–Van Allen House =

- U.S. National Register of Historic Places
- New Jersey Register of Historic Places
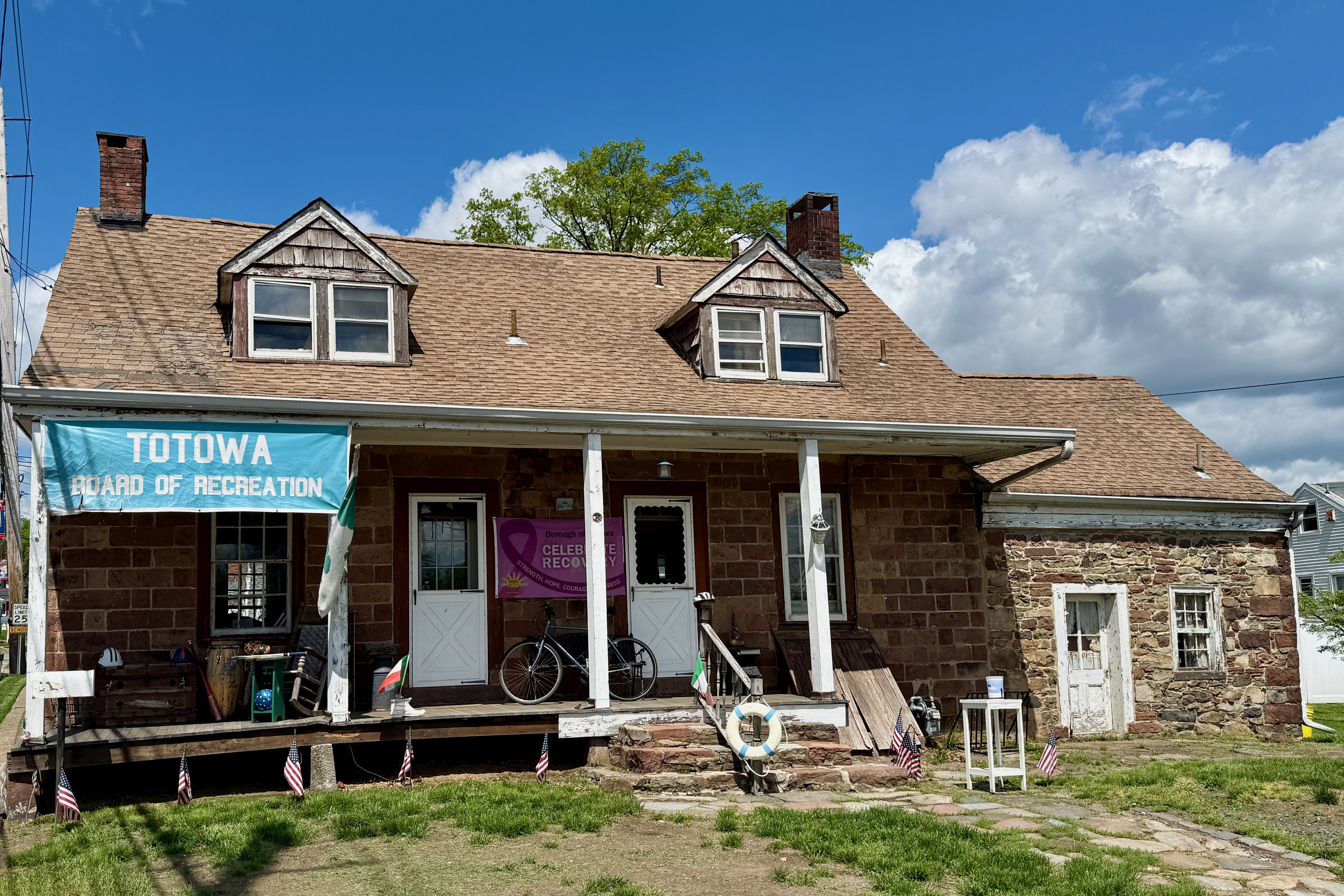
- Van Houten–Van Allen House in 2025

- Location within Passaic County, New Jersey Location within New Jersey Location within the United States
- Location: 490 Totowa Road, Totowa, New Jersey
- Coordinates: 40°54′13.3″N 74°12′58.6″W
- Built: c. 1772
- Architectural style: Dutch Colonial
- NRHP reference No.: 100011599
- NJRHP No.: 5861

Significant dates
- Added to NRHP: April 4, 2025
- Designated NJRHP: February 13, 2025

The Van Houten–Van Allen House, also known as the Van Allen–Garretson House, is a historic Dutch Colonial stone house located at 490 Totowa Road in the borough of Totowa in Passaic County, New Jersey, United States. It was built by Roelif and Antye Van Houten around 1772. The house was documented by the Historic American Buildings Survey (HABS) in 1938 and was added to the National Register of Historic Places on April 4, 2025, for its significance in architecture.

== History and description ==
The 1 1/2 story house has two sections. The oldest was built around 1772 by Roelif and Antye Van Houten using locally sourced brownstone. The smaller, kitchen section was added around 1817 by John and Agnes Van Allen, soon after they had purchased the house. The house was owned by John Garretson in 1938, when it was documented by HABS.

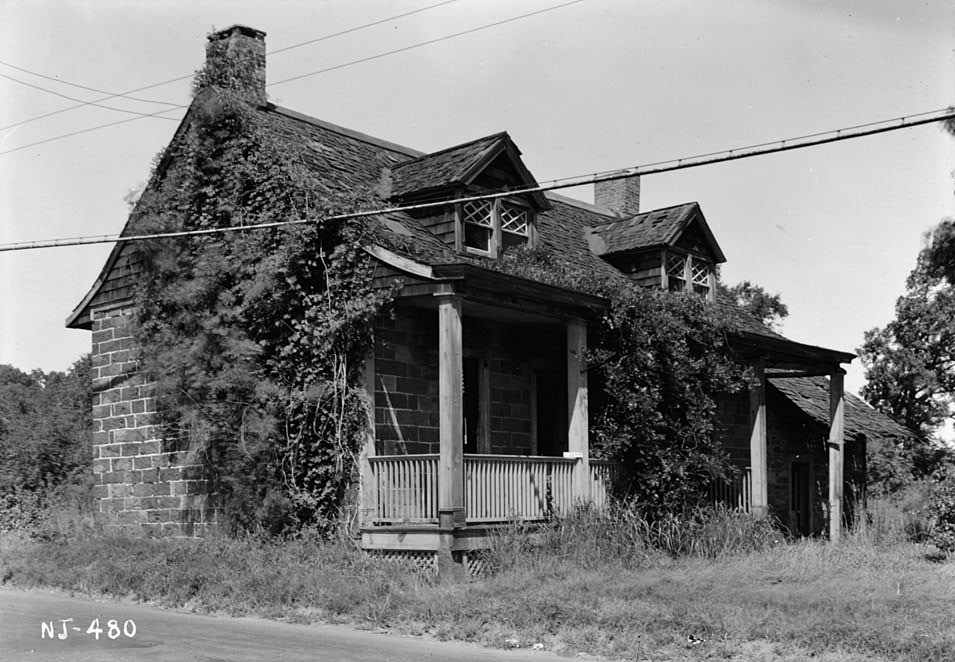
HABS photo from 1938

== See also ==
- National Register of Historic Places listings in Passaic County, New Jersey
- List of the oldest buildings in New Jersey
