= Danforth Memorial Library =

- U.S. National Register of Historic Places
- New Jersey Register of Historic Places
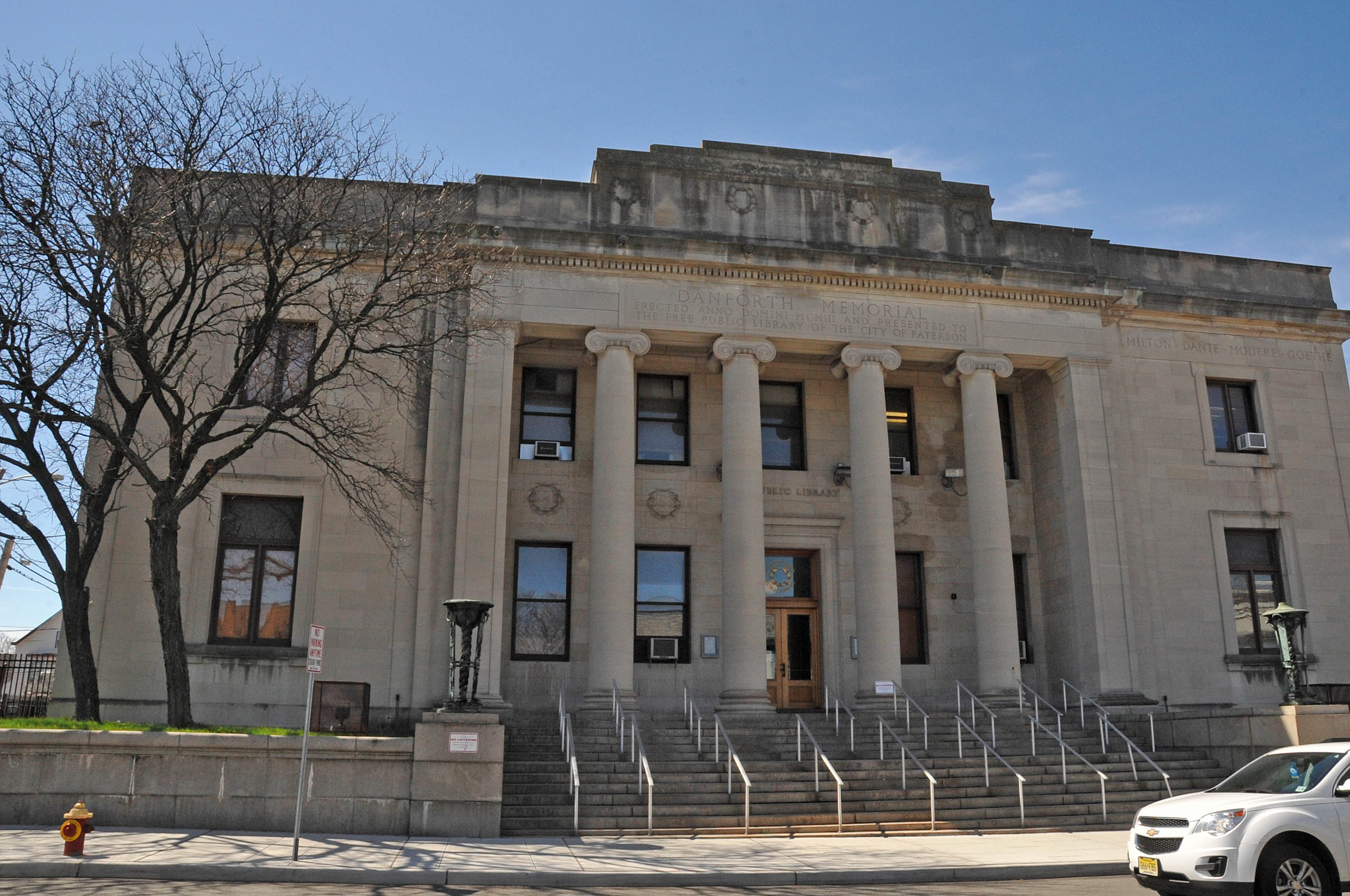

- Location within Passaic County, New Jersey Location within New Jersey Location within the United States
- Location: 250 Broadway, Paterson, New Jersey
- Coordinates: 40°55′5″N 74°9′52″W
- Area: 1.5 acres (0.61 ha)
- Built: 1905
- Architect: Henry Bacon
- Architectural style: Classical Revival
- NRHP reference No.: 84002782
- NJRHP No.: 2371

Significant dates
- Added to NRHP: March 1, 1984
- Designated NJRHP: January 4, 1983

Danforth Memorial Library, also known as the Paterson Free Public Library, is located at 250 Broadway in the city of Paterson in Passaic County, New Jersey, United States. The library was built in 1905 and was added to the National Register of Historic Places on March 1, 1984, for its significance in architecture, education, and social history.

The Library sits on a 1.5 acre property and houses the city's art collection, mostly of painting 19th century paintings donated to the city.

== History ==
The Paterson Free Public Library was established in 1885. Although Paterson had many libraries and reading rooms across the city as early as 1828, most were accessible only to those who paid subscription fees. It wasn’t until 1884, when New Jersey Assemblyman William Prall introduced the New Jersey General Library Act to the State Legislature and called for the establishment of free public libraries across the state. On April 13, 1885, residents of Paterson voted in favor of the Act.

It is the oldest public library in New Jersey, and citizens of Paterson created it. Danforth Memorial Library is the current location of the main library branch, and is located at 250 Broadway after the Great Fire of 1902 destroyed the first two libraries. Some 40,000 books in the original Danforth Library were destroyed in the fire, the only books that survived were some on loan by patrons in their homes. The devastating fire left some 500 families homeless and destroyed several city buildings including City Hall, police station, high-school, two banks, five churches, a theatre, among others. In 1888, Mary Elizabeth Danforth Ryle funded the historical building in memory of her father, Charles Danforth, a leading industrialist in Paterson and the inventor of the frame used in Cotton-spinning machinery. Mrs. Ryle gifted the funds under two conditions: that the building be used solely for the city’s Free Public Library and to bear the name “Danforth.” Mrs. Ryle died in 1904, before being able to see the library construction completed in memory of her father.

When the cornerstone of the library was laid in October of 1903, Patersonian and Vice Chancellor Eugene Stevens, of the New Jersey Chancery Court said at the ceremony, “…This building will be the home of the Free Public Library of Paterson. It will be an architectural ornament to our city. It has been skillfully designed to meet all the requirements of the most efficient modern library work.” During the laying of the cornerstone ceremony, several items were deposited in the corner stone, including; a photograph of Mrs. Mary E. Ryle, an engraved portrait of the late Charles Danforth, a scrap-book with outlines of the history of both the old and new Danforth Libraries, the Great Fire of 1902 and the Great Floods of 1902 and 1903, silver coins on 1902-1903, and others.

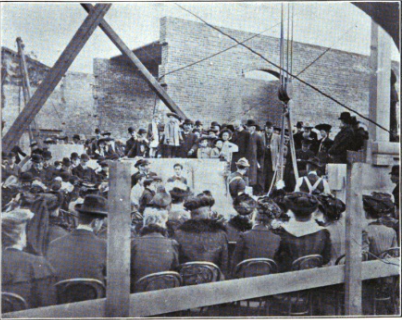
From the Laying of the Cornerstone Ceremony of the Danforth Memorial Library in Paterson, NJ (1903)

A formal dedication ceremony was held on April 29, 1905 where native-Patersonian and former Governor of New Jersey / former member of President William McKinley’s cabinet, John W. Griggs remarked, “Out of the ashes of the old has risen the new nobler structure, an ornament as well as a utility to our city, a building to rejoice over, to behold with admiration and to regard with civic pride.”

The Danforth Memorial Library officially opened to the public on May 1, 1905 to a crowd of thousands who jumped on the first opportunity to visit the building. At the time, the total cost of the building construction along with its furnishings was $220,000 (equal to about $7.7 million dollars in 2024).

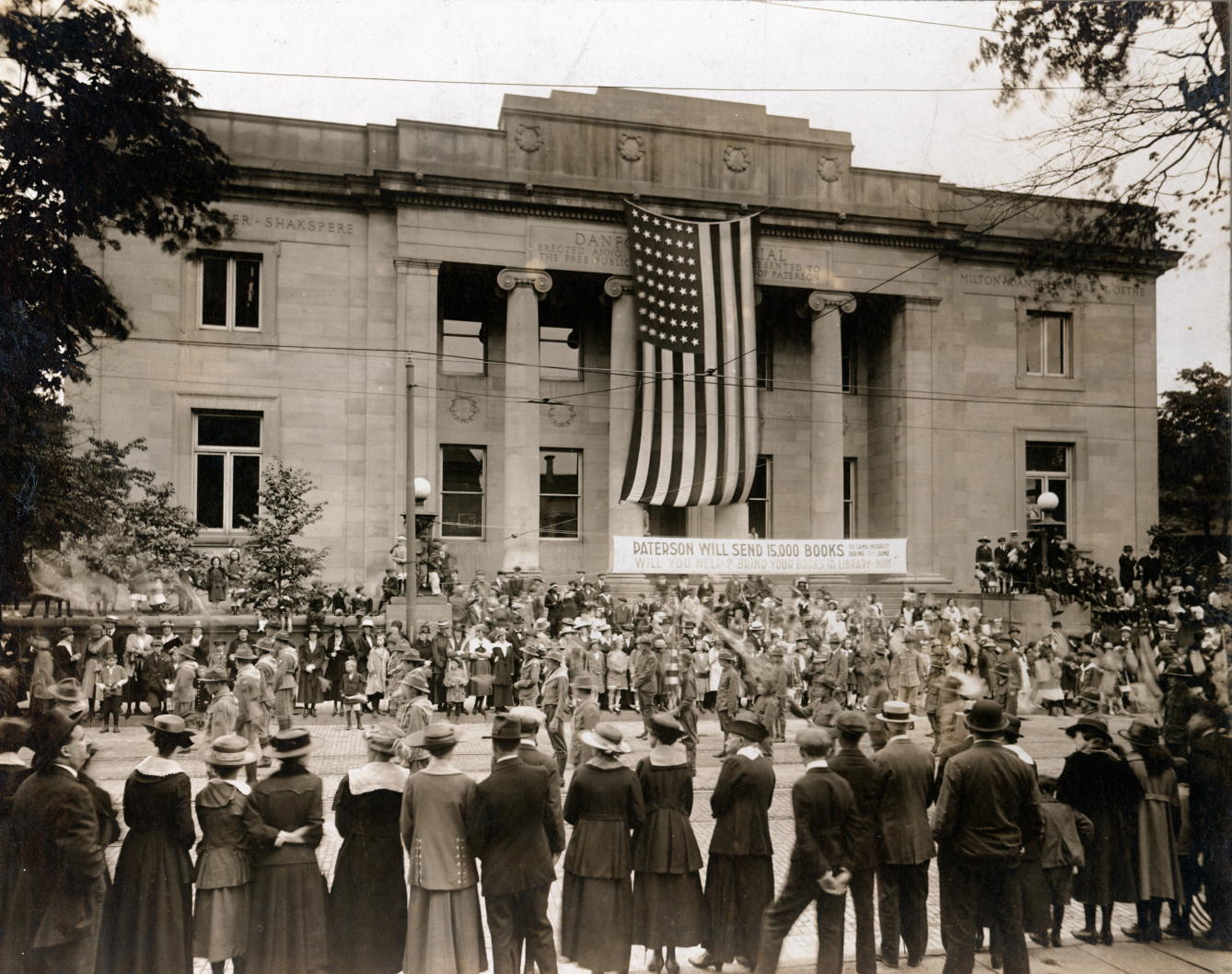
Books are collected at the Danforth Memorial Library in 1918 to be donated to soldiers training at Camp Merritt during WWI

The Library (and its branches) were closed from October 7 – 25, 1918 by order of the Board of Health because of the Spanish Flu epidemic.

In 1925, the wife of Vice-President Garrett A. Hobart, gifted a valuable collection of paintings as a memorial to her late-husband to be hung as a permanent exhibit within the library. Hobart donated 26 works of art, including the 1872 painting The Bath by American artist, and cofounder of the Metropolitan Museum of Art, Eastman Johnson.

Remodeling was done to the library in 1967, where a staircase was removed from the stack area, a small additional was made to the rear of the building, two of the three skylights were removed, and overhead lighting and air-conditioning were installed along with dropped ceilings on the two floors.

By 1995, the library system was reduced from seven locations to three, prior to this, there was a branch in each of the city’s wards. By 1995, there were three (3) additional library branches in the Paterson Public Library system. In 2011, Hurricane Irene destroyed the First Ward (also known as Northside) Branch. Since then, a branch service has been running out of the Christopher Hope Center on Temple Street in its location. In November, 2022, the city announced it was selling the North Main Street library location to a Paterson-based nonprofit group that planned to convert the building into a resource center that would provide mental health counseling, job training and reentry services.

These branches are the Totowa Branch, Southside Branch, and Northside Branch. Danforth Memorial Library opened the Community Learning Center in 1986, and it has increased its African American and Spanish language collection. In 2002, the Bill & Melinda Gates Foundation donated 35 computers. The library’s Southside location now offers an Arabic/Islamic collection thanks to a New Jersey State Library special collections grant. The Danforth Memorial Library is a member of the PALS Plus consortium.

== Architecture ==
The Danforth Memorial Library architecture is described as Classical Revival. It is a two-story building with four monumental columns made with gray limestone material on a granite foundation. It was designed by Henry Bacon, who also designed the Lincoln Memorial in Washington, D.C.

The 1956 Biographical Dictionary of American Architects featured Bacon’s architecture and said, “Among the notable examples of his work should be named the Danforth Memorial Library." In a biographical blub on Bacon, the 1978 Encyclopedia of Americana stated, “A strict adherent to the classic Greek style of architecture, Bacon designed several important buildings, among them the public library in Paterson, N.J.”

There are 33 names of famous classical works carved on the structure’s frieze that runs around the entire building. Inside, visitors will find a large bronze tablet which commemorates the building’s donor, Mrs. Mary E. Ryle (Charles Danforth’s daughter), depicting her as an angel-like figure in bas-relief completed by sculptor Evelyn Beatrice Longman (who also worked with Bacon on the sculpturing of the Lincoln Memorial). The bronze tablet was added to the library entrance in November of 1907 after a citizen movement begun pushing for a suitable memorial to be erected in Mrs. Ryle’s honor. Shortly after, Mrs. William Prall gifted a bronze medallion with the head of Rev. William Prall, D.D., who was the library’s first President and one of its founders. Today, that medallion hangs inside the Reference Department.

When the library opened in 1905, it featured four stories of steel book stacks which could shelve sixty thousand volumes, a children’s library with hundreds of books, an art library, newspaper reading room, coal cellar, assembly and exhibition room, and reference library, among others. The library also contained four stories of steel book stack shelving in an area of the library that is completely fireproof and housed more than 25,000 volumes.

The property owner is the Board of Library Trustees of the City of Paterson. In 2020, the Governor of New Jersey, Phil Murphy, granted $734,812 to rehabilitate the historic landmark; this fund came from the Library Construction Bond Act. According to the library administration, the rehabilitation project will cost $1,469,624; the current mayor, André Sayegh, and his administration need to cover the matching amount. The rehabilitation project consists of renovating the Children's Department and the Community Literacy Center, modifying the elevator to American with Disabilities standards, replacing the library's roof, and repairing the retaining wall.

== Administration ==
As of March 2024, the Paterson Free Public Library director is Corey Fleming.

=== Board of Library Trustees of the City of Paterson. ===
As of March 2024:

- Debra Bracy, Mayor’s Alternate
- Margie Di Alva-Leon
- Shanikwa Lemon, Superintendent’s Alternate
- Errol Kerr, Vice President
- Tracy Pearson
- Irene Sterling, Secretary/Treasurer
- Derya Taskin, President
- Mahbubah Uddin
- Dennis Vroegindewey

== See also ==
- Mary Danforth Ryle
- National Register of Historic Places listings in Passaic County, New Jersey
