= Ryles =

Ryles is a surname. Notable people with the surname include:

- Jason Ryles (born 1979), Australian rugby player
- John Wesley Ryles (1950–2025), American musician
- Nancy Ryles (1937–1990), American politician

== Other ==
- Ryles Jazz Club, Cambridge, Massachusetts, United States

== See also ==
- Ryle (disambiguation)
