= National Register of Historic Places listings in Passaic County, New Jersey =

Location of Passaic County in New Jersey

List of the National Register of Historic Places listings in Passaic County, New Jersey

Contents: Counties and communities in New Jersey
Atlantic – Bergen (Closter, Franklin Lakes, Ridgewood, Saddle River, Wyckoff) – Burlington – Camden – Cape May – Cumberland – Essex – Gloucester – Hudson – Hunterdon – Mercer – Middlesex – Monmouth – Morris – Ocean – Passaic – Salem – Somerset – Sussex – Union – Warren

This is intended to be a complete list of properties and districts listed on the National Register of Historic Places in Passaic County, New Jersey. Latitude and longitude coordinates of the sites listed on this page may be displayed in an online map.

This National Park Service list is complete through NPS recent listings posted October 23, 2026.

	Name on the Register	Image	Date listed	Location	City or town	Description
1	Ailsa Farms	Ailsa Farms	April 30, 1976 (#76001181)	300 Pompton Road; 40°56′37″N 74°11′50″W	Wayne	The Ailsa Farms estate is now William Paterson University. The estate's house, Haledon Hall, has been restored as Hobart Manor.
2	Arch Street Bridge over the Passaic River	Arch Street Bridge over the Passaic River	March 22, 2018 (#100002230)	Arch St. over Passaic R. 40°55′24″N 74°10′12″W	Paterson	
3	Aycrigg Mansion	Aycrigg Mansion	April 29, 1982 (#82003299)	Main Ave. and Temple Pl. 40°51′02″N 74°07′30″W	Passaic	
4	Belle Vista	Belle Vista	June 3, 1976 (#76001180)	Valley Road in Garret Mountain Reservation; 40°54′00″N 74°10′22″W	Paterson	Known as Lambert Castle
5	Botany Worsted Mills Historic District	Botany Worsted Mills Historic District	July 26, 1991 (#91000928)	80-82 and 90 Dayton Ave. and 6-32 Mattimore St. 40°52′25″N 74°07′10″W	Passaic	
6	Pietro Botto House	Pietro Botto House	July 30, 1974 (#74001188)	83 Norwood St. 40°56′05″N 74°11′19″W	Haledon	Also known as Pietro and Maria Botto House
7	Cathedral of St. John the Baptist	Cathedral of St. John the Baptist	December 16, 1977 (#77000903)	Main and Grand Sts. 40°54′46″N 74°10′21″W	Paterson	
8	Clinton Furnace	Clinton Furnace	June 18, 1976 (#76001179)	at the base of the Clinton Reservoir by the Clinton Brook; 41°04′20″N 74°27′00″W	West Milford	
9	Frederick William Cooke Residence	Frederick William Cooke Residence	July 8, 1982 (#82003302)	384 Broadway; 40°55′06″N 74°09′31″W	Paterson	Destroyed by fire in 1991.
10	Danforth Memorial Library	Danforth Memorial Library	March 1, 1984 (#84002782)	250 Broadway; 40°55′05″N 74°09′52″W	Paterson	Also known as the Paterson Free Public Library
11	Dey Mansion	Dey Mansion	December 18, 1970 (#70000392)	199 Totowa Rd. 40°54′56″N 74°14′00″W	Wayne	
12	Dundee Canal Industrial Historic District	Dundee Canal Industrial Historic District	January 21, 1999 (#98001640)	George St., N along Dundee Canal, approx. 1.2 mi. to headgates opposite E. Clifton Ave. 40°52′25″N 74°07′12″W	Passaic	
13	Eastside Park Historic District	Eastside Park Historic District	July 7, 2004 (#04000673)	Roughly bounded by 20th, Vreeland, and 11th Aves., E. 33rd St. and Mclean Bvd. 40°54′53″N 74°08′13″W	Paterson	
14	John W. Ferguson House	John W. Ferguson House	May 23, 1980 (#80002516)	421 12th Ave. 40°55′11″N 74°08′46″W	Paterson	Demolished in 1988.
15	Garritse–Doremus–Westervelt House	Garritse–Doremus–Westervelt House	March 20, 2023 (#100008730)	Park Drive, Weasel Brook Park; 40°52′16″N 74°08′48″W	Clifton	Also known as Vanderhoef–Westervelt House
16	Goffle Brook Park	Goffle Brook Park	November 1, 2002 (#02001276)	Goffle Rd., bet. Lafayette and MacFarlan Ave. 40°57′22″N 74°09′42″W	Hawthorne	
17	Great Falls of the Passaic and Society for Useful Manufactures Historic District	Great Falls of the Passaic and Society for Useful Manufactures Historic District	April 17, 1970 (#70000391)	At Passaic River; 40°55′01″N 74°10′52″W	Paterson	
18	Hinchliffe Stadium	Hinchliffe Stadium	March 22, 2004 (#04000223)	Maple and Liberty Sts., overlooking the Great Falls of the Passaic; 40°55′13″N 74°10′53″W	Paterson	Listed as "National Register of Historic Places - Local Significance." This error was never corrected.
19	Kossuth Street School	Kossuth Street School	April 10, 1980 (#80002515)	47 Kossuth St. 40°56′17″N 74°11′01″W	Haledon	
20	Little Falls Municipal Building	Little Falls Municipal Building	September 9, 2026 (#100013417)	35 Stevens Avenue; 40°52′49″N 74°13′45″W	Little Falls	Also known as Little Falls Old Town Hall
21	Long Pond Ironworks	Long Pond Ironworks	January 11, 1974 (#74001189)	NE of West Milford on NJ 511; 41°08′47″N 74°18′39″W	West Milford	
22	Morris Canal	Morris Canal	October 1, 1974 (#74002228)	Irregular line beginning at Phillipsburg and ending at Jersey City; 40°41′08″N 75°09′49″W	Not applicable	
23	Passaic County Court House and United States Custom House and Post Office Historic District	Passaic County Court House and United States Custom House and Post Office Historic District	July 21, 2015 (#15000443)	73-87, 63-65 Hamilton St. 40°54′49″N 74°10′17″W	Paterson	
24	Passaic Elks Club	Passaic Elks Club	December 28, 2005 (#05001485)	29-31 Howe Ave. 40°51′46″N 74°07′40″W	Passaic	
25	Paterson City Hall	Paterson City Hall	March 10, 1995 (#95000232)	155 Market Street; 40°55′00″N 74°10′19″W	Paterson	
26	Paterson Downtown Commercial Historic District	Paterson Downtown Commercial Historic District	February 12, 1999 (#99000192)	Roughly bounded by Patterson, Ward and Gross Sts., and Hamilton Ave. 40°55′02″N 74°10′21″W	Paterson	
27	People's Bank and Trust Company Building	People's Bank and Trust Company Building	November 19, 2018 (#100003110)	663 Main Ave. 40°51′40″N 74°07′35″W	Passaic	
28	Public School Number Two	Public School Number Two	March 8, 1978 (#78001790)	Mill and Passaic Sts. 40°54′55″N 74°10′38″W	Paterson	
29	John W. Rea House	John W. Rea House	September 17, 1999 (#99001168)	675 Goffle Rd. 40°57′26″N 74°09′43″W	Hawthorne	
30	Reinhardt Mills	Reinhardt Mills	May 9, 2003 (#03000393)	283-297 21st Ave., 122-136 20th Ave., 46-72 Gray St., 45-67 State St. 40°54′28″N 74°09′43″W	Paterson	
31	Ringwood Manor	Ringwood Manor	November 13, 1966 (#66000471)	3 mi. E of Hewitt, Ringwood Manor State Park; 41°08′40″N 74°15′10″W	Ringwood	
32	Schuyler–Colfax House	Schuyler–Colfax House	April 3, 1973 (#73001133)	2343 Paterson Hamburg Turnpike; 40°59′15″N 74°16′47″W	Wayne	
33	Skylands	Skylands	September 28, 1990 (#90001438)	Ringwood State Park; 41°07′30″N 74°14′14″W	Ringwood	
34	Reynier Speer House	Reynier Speer House	July 18, 1985 (#85001566)	612 Upper Mountain Ave. 40°51′37″N 74°12′11″W	Little Falls	
35	St. John's Evangelical Lutheran Church	St. John's Evangelical Lutheran Church	May 7, 1982 (#82003301)	140 Lexington Ave. 40°52′04″N 74°07′38″W	Passaic	
36	St. Michael's Roman Catholic Church	St. Michael's Roman Catholic Church	December 15, 1978 (#78001791)	74 Cianci St. 40°54′53″N 74°10′30″W	Paterson	
37	St. Nicholas Roman Catholic Church	St. Nicholas Roman Catholic Church	May 14, 1979 (#79001517)	Washington, State and Ann Streets; 40°51′43″N 74°07′24″W	Passaic	
38	Straight Street Bridge over the Passaic River	Straight Street Bridge over the Passaic River	March 22, 2018 (#100002231)	Straight St. over Passaic R. 40°55′35″N 74°09′58″W	Paterson	
39	Daniel Thompson and John Ryle Houses	Daniel Thompson and John Ryle Houses	July 30, 1981 (#81000398)	8 and 9 Mill St. 40°54′59″N 74°10′42″W	Paterson	
40	United States Animal Quarantine Station	United States Animal Quarantine Station	October 9, 1981 (#81000397)	Clifton Avenue; 40°52′05″N 74°09′43″W	Clifton	
41	Van Houten House	Van Houten House	March 7, 1973 (#73001132)	114 Totowa Avenue, Westside Park; 40°54′48″N 74°11′26″W	Paterson	
42	Van Houten–Van Allen House	Van Houten–Van Allen House	April 4, 2025 (#100011599)	490 Totowa Road; 40°54′13″N 74°12′59″W	Totowa	
43	Van Riper–Hopper House	Van Riper–Hopper House	August 21, 1972 (#72000806)	533 Berdan Avenue; 40°58′40″N 74°14′34″W	Wayne	
44	John and Anna Vreeland House	John and Anna Vreeland House	May 13, 1982 (#82003300)	971 Valley Road; 40°52′05″N 74°11′28″W	Clifton	Also known as the Hamilton House Museum

== Former listing ==
	Name on the Register	Image	Date listed	Date removed	Location	City or town	Description
1	Van Duyne House	Van Duyne House	August 12, 1971 (#71001051)	December 15, 1976	636 Fairfield Rd. (Original location, currently at 533 Berdan Ave.); 40°58′40″N 74°14′35″W	Wayne	Relocated in 1974 due to relocation of NJ 23, and was delisted due to relocation. Now at the Wayne Museum, known as the Mead–Van Duyne House.

== See also ==
- National Register of Historic Places listings in New Jersey
- List of National Historic Landmarks in New Jersey
