= Our Lady of Mercy Chapel =

Historic church in New Jersey, United States

- U.S. National Register of Historic Places
- New Jersey Register of Historic Places
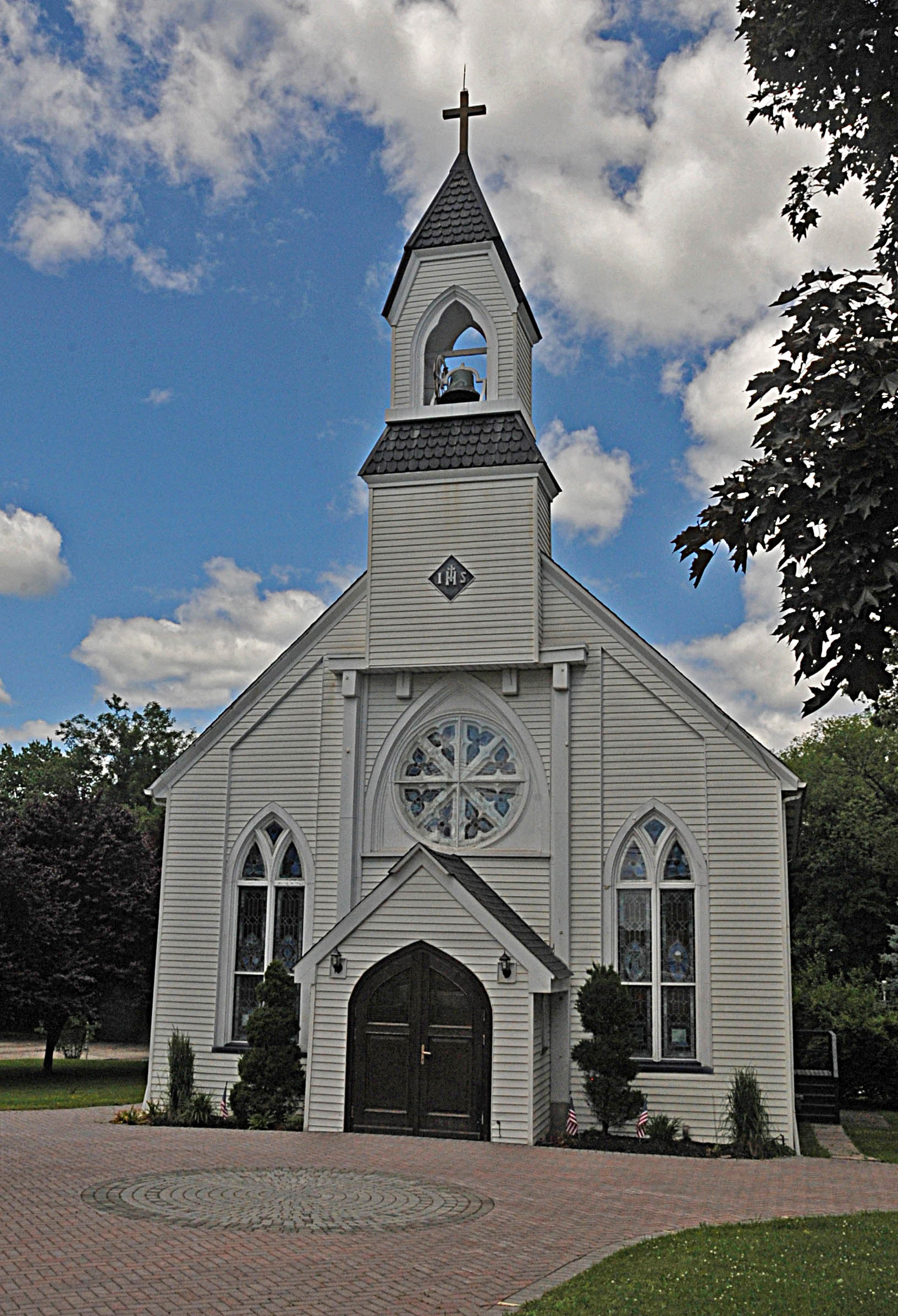

- Location within Morris County, New Jersey Location within New Jersey Location within the United States
- Location: 100 Whippany Road, Whippany, New Jersey
- Coordinates: 40°49′11″N 74°25′1″W
- Area: 3 acres (1.2 ha)
- Built: 1853
- Architectural style: Gothic Revival, Carpenter Gothic
- NRHP reference No.: 78001785
- NJRHP No.: 2122

Significant dates
- Added to NRHP: September 18, 1978
- Designated NJRHP: December 19, 1977

Our Lady of Mercy Chapel is a historic chapel at 100 Whippany Road in the Whippany section of Hanover Township in Morris County, New Jersey, United States.

It was built in 1853 and added to the National Register in 1978.
