= St. Michael's Roman Catholic Church =

Historic church in Paterson, New Jersey, United States

- U.S. National Register of Historic Places
- New Jersey Register of Historic Places
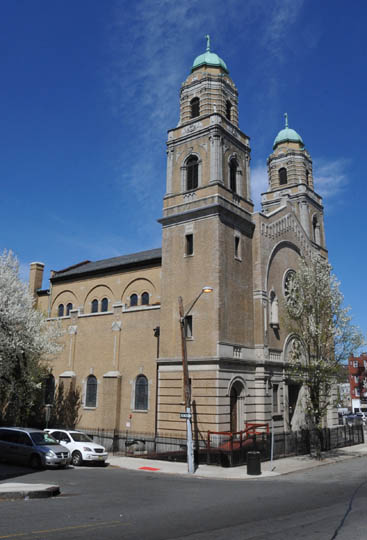

- Location within Passaic County, New Jersey Location within New Jersey Location within the United States
- Location: 74 Cianci Street, Paterson, New Jersey
- Coordinates: 40°54′53″N 74°10′30″W
- Area: 1.1 acres (0.45 ha)
- Built: 1836
- Architect: Bellomo, Joseph
- Architectural style: Renaissance, Italian Gothic
- NRHP reference No.: 78001791
- NJRHP No.: 2396

Significant dates
- Added to NRHP: December 15, 1978
- Designated NJRHP: May 13, 1978

St. Michael's Roman Catholic Church is a historic church at 74 Cianci Street in Paterson, Passaic County, New Jersey, United States.

It was built in 1836 and added to the National Register in 1978.

== See also ==
- National Register of Historic Places listings in Passaic County, New Jersey
