= Ryle, Kentucky =

Unincorporated community in Kentucky, United States

- Unincorporated community
- Location within the state of Kentucky Ryle (the United States)
- Coordinates: 38°47′43″N 84°43′0″W
- Country: United States
- State: Kentucky
- County: Gallatin
- Elevation: 614 ft (187 m)
- Time zone: UTC-6 (Central (CST))
  - Summer (DST): UTC-5 (CST)
- GNIS feature ID: 508993

Ryle is an unincorporated community located in Gallatin County, Kentucky, United States.
