= Van Riper–Hopper House =

Historic house in New Jersey, United States

- U.S. National Register of Historic Places
- New Jersey Register of Historic Places
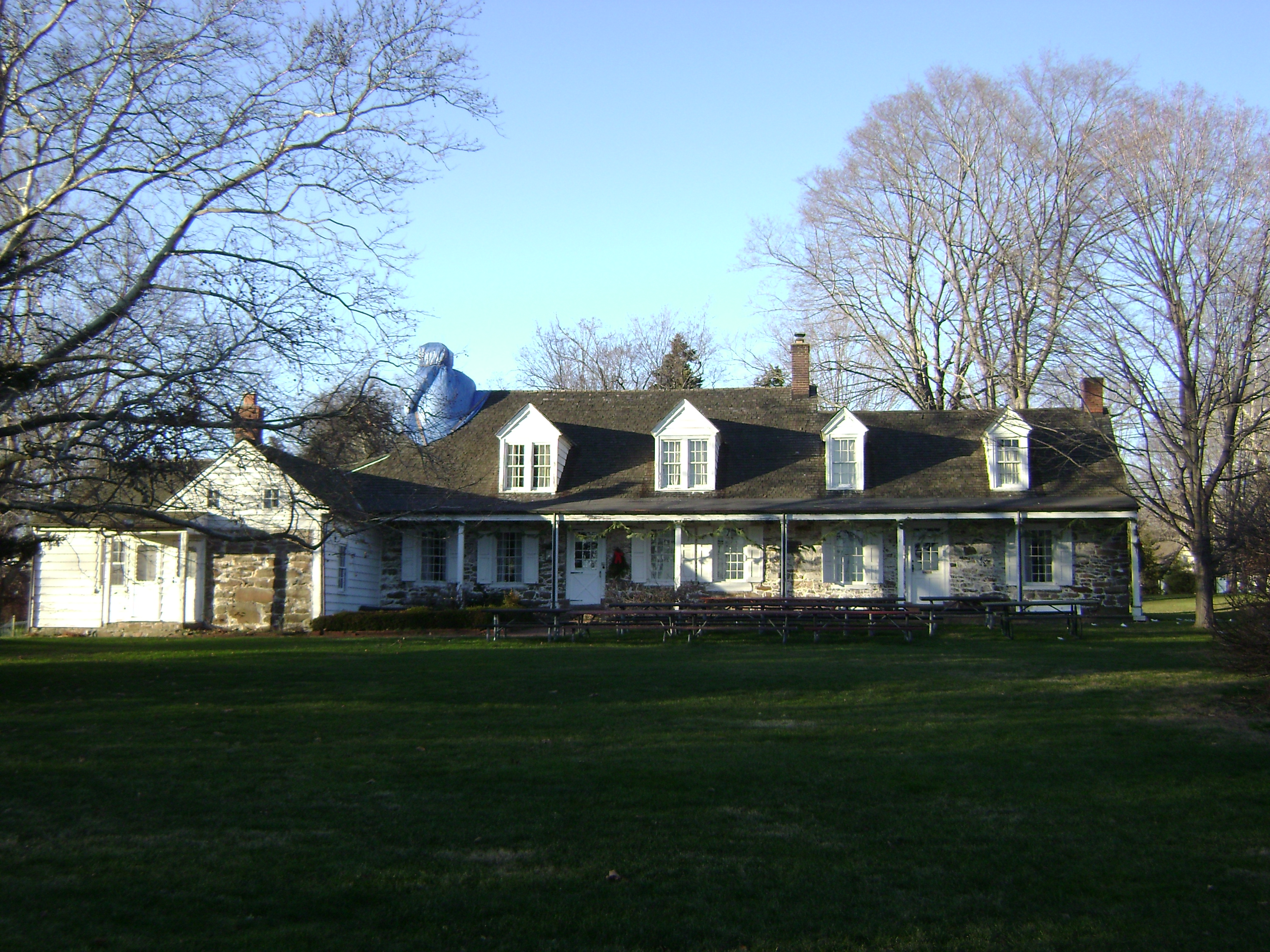
- Van Riper–Hopper House Museum, seen from the front in mid-December, 2011.

- Location within Passaic County, New Jersey Location within New Jersey Location within the United States
- Nearest city: 533 Berdan Avenue, Wayne, New Jersey
- Coordinates: 40°58′39.59″N 74°14′34.45″W
- Area: 2.7 acres (1.1 ha)
- Architect: Van Riper, Uriah R. & Berdan
- Architectural style: Dutch Colonial
- NRHP reference No.: 72000806
- NJRHP No.: 2418

Significant dates
- Added to NRHP: August 21, 1972
- Designated NJRHP: May 1, 1972

Van Riper–Hopper House is located in Wayne, Passaic County, New Jersey, United States. The house was built in 1786 and was added to the National Register of Historic Places on August 21, 1972. The house is home to the Wayne Township Museum.

== History ==
The house was built in 1786 by Uriah Van Riper. The house remained in the Van Riper family and was bequeathed to Uriah Van Riper's great-granddaughter, Mary Ann Van Riper, who married Andrew Hopper in 1872. On July 6, 1964, the house was officially dedicated as the Wayne Township Museum. Prior to Uriah's building the house, the property was purchased by Richard (Dirck) Van Riper in 1762, and consisted of 145 acres. The town of Wayne was known as Saddle River at the time, which is referenced in Richard Van Riper's will. The "barn house" in the back was removed from its original place near the Wayne Hills Mall, and transported to the property of the Van Riper House Museum.

== Geography ==
When the Van Riper–Hopper House land was first purchased, Northern New Jersey was divided into East and West Jersey. Today's Wayne Township was known as Saddle River, and belonged to Bergen County. Its location is now known as Passaic County.

== Architecture ==
The house was built in the traditional Dutch Colonial style. The second hallway of the second floor was altered by a previous owner in the 1950s. Built in closets and dressers were added, which were not typical of the Dutch Colonial style.

== See also ==
- National Register of Historic Places listings in Passaic County, New Jersey
- List of museums in New Jersey
