= William Ryle =

American businessman

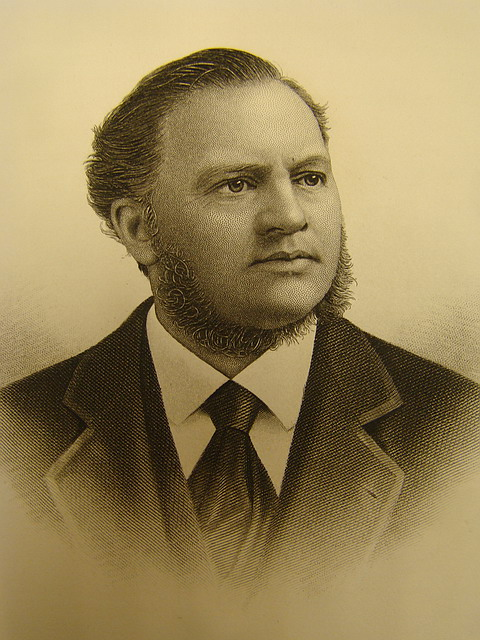

William Ryle II (1834–1881) was an English silk manufacturer who lived in the United States.

== Biography ==
He was born on March 8, 1834, in Macclesfield, England to William Ryle I, one of the most successful silk manufacturers in England. William Ryle was the nephew of John Ryle, who is widely regarded as the "Father of the U.S. Silk Industry" in Paterson, New Jersey.

Ryle later went to the United States where in Paterson, New Jersey and in New York City, he owned and operated the largest silk importing firm in the United States.

Ryle married Mary Danforth, daughter of Charles Danforth, a railroad tycoon.

He died in Paterson on November 5, 1881. At the time of his death, his fortune was estimated to be close to $25,000,000, equivalent to $815,000,000 in 2024.
