= St. Nicholas Catholic Church (Passaic, New Jersey) =

Historic church in New Jersey, United States

- St. Nicholas Roman Catholic Church
- U.S. National Register of Historic Places
- New Jersey Register of Historic Places
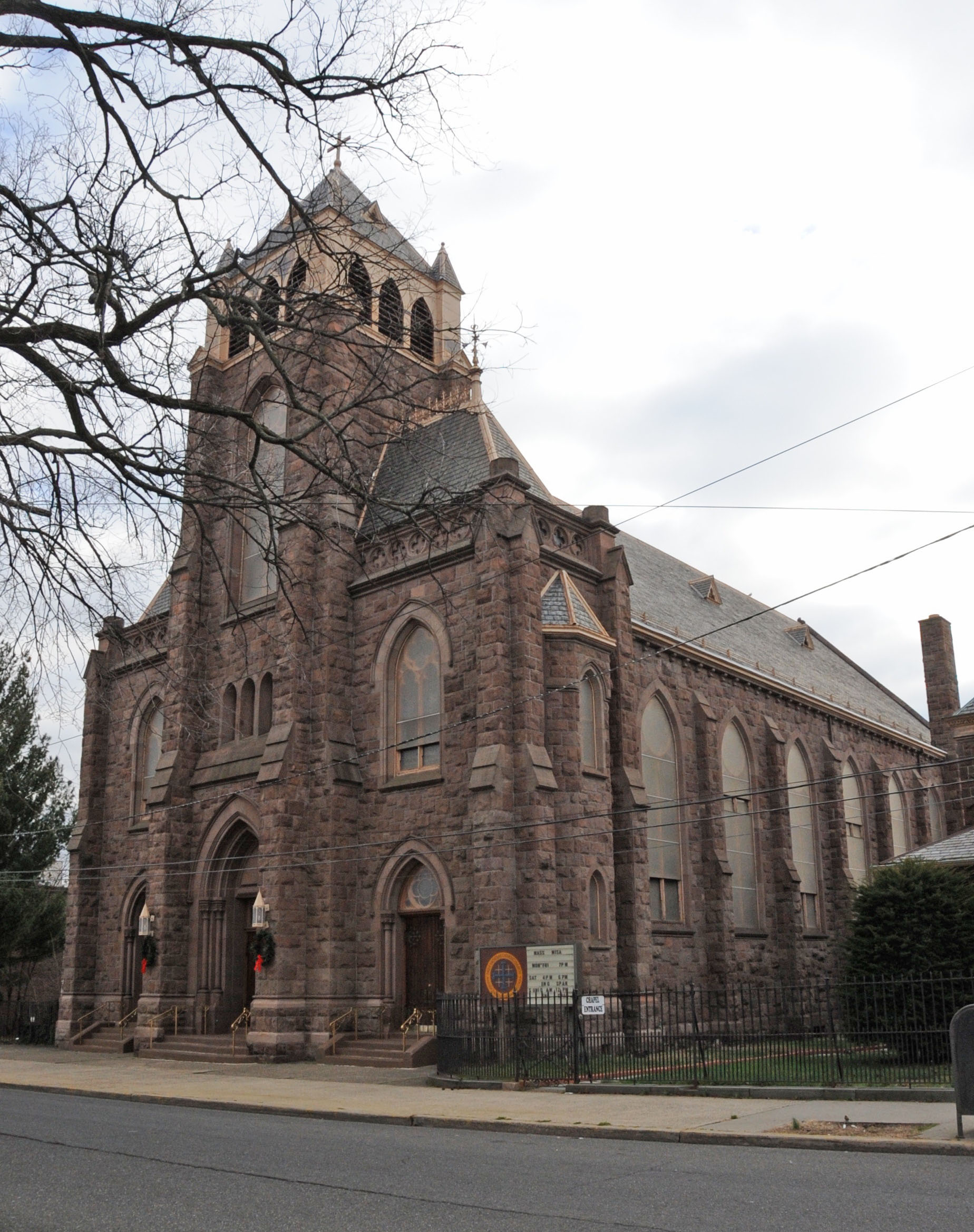
- The church in 2016

- Location within Passaic County, New Jersey Location within New Jersey Location within the United States
- Location: 153 Washington Place, Passaic, New Jersey
- Coordinates: 40°51′43″N 74°7′24″W
- Built: 1889
- Architect: William Schickel
- Architectural style: Gothic Revival
- NRHP reference No.: 79001517
- NJRHP No.: 2355

Significant dates
- Added to NRHP: May 14, 1979
- Designated NJRHP: February 16, 1979

St. Nicholas Roman Catholic Church is a Catholic parish located at 153 Washington Place in the city of Passaic in Passaic County, New Jersey, United States. The parish is in the Diocese of Paterson. It should not be confused with St. Nicholas Ukrainian Catholic Church, also located in Passaic. The church building was added to the National Register of Historic Places on May 14, 1979, for its significance in architecture and religion.

== History and description ==
The parish was founded in the 1860s by Franciscans from St. Bonaventure's in Paterson. In 1868, Bishop Bayley designated the community a parish and appointed a pastor, and a church and school were built on Prospect Street. The church was destroyed by fire in 1875 and replaced on the same site.

Construction on the current church on Washington, State and Ann Streets began in 1885 and was completed around 1889. It was designed by architect William Schickel with High Victorian Gothic style. According to the nomination form, it is "one of the finest examples of Gothic architecture" in the city.

== See also ==
- National Register of Historic Places listings in Passaic County, New Jersey
