= John Ryle (manufacturer) =

American businessman and politician

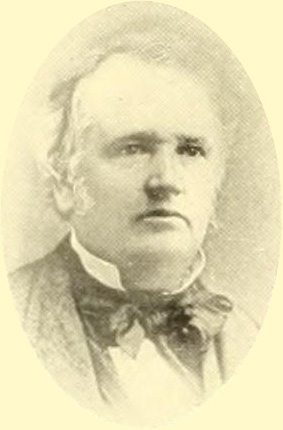
- Born: October 22, 1817; Bollington, Cheshire, England
- Died: November 6, 1887 (aged 70); Macclesfield, Cheshire, England
- Known for: Silk manufacturing

John Ryle (October 22, 1817 – November 6, 1887) was the Mayor of Paterson, New Jersey from 1869 to 1870. An English-born silk manufacturer, he was best known for being the "father of the United States silk industry".

Born in Bollington, Macclesfield, Cheshire, England, Ryle started working in the silk mills of his native town at the age of five, where he was a "bobbin boy". His family had been involved in the silk industry for generations, and his two eldest brothers, Reuben and William Ryle, were England's largest manufacturers of silk.

== Early life ==
John Ryle was one of seventeen children born to Peter and Sarah (Brunt) Ryle. Only five of the children lived to maturity: Reuben, William, Sarah, John, and Peter Jr.

John Ryle's father died in 1820, when John was three years old, and his mother's death four years later left him and his siblings orphans. Until he came of age, he worked in various silk mills in and about Macclesfield. Ryle sailed to the United States from Liverpool on 1 March 1839, with the intention of staking out business for his two brothers and seeing how the silk industry was progressing in America. He did not intend at first to remain in the country.

When Ryle arrived in 1839, silk was not manufactured to any great extent in the United States. The multicaulis fever was then at its height, and America promised to be the silk-producing country of the world. One of those most largely interested in this multicaulis speculation was Samuel Whitmarsh of Northampton, Massachusetts. This gentleman had a small silk mill, and Ryle went there and obtained employment. His work here, however, was short-lived, for in that same year the multicaulis speculation collapsed, and his employer, Mr. Whitmarsh, was ruined in the crash that followed.

John Ryle then returned to New York and for a short time imported the products of the looms of his brothers in England and carried on the business of importing and selling in a small way at the corner of Maiden Lane and William Streets.

== Silk manufacturing in Paterson ==
During his first year in the United States, Ryle met George W. Murray, who at that time wanted to work in the silk-manufacturing business.

Murray and Ryle went to Christopher Colt, in Hartford, Connecticut, who had a small plant of silk machinery and had made an unsuccessful attempt at manufacturing in what became known as the Old Gun Mill in Paterson. In 1840, Murray bought the plant and placed it in charge of John Ryle, who three years later was admitted to partnership. The business was then carried out under the name of Murray & Ryle. In 1846, Ryle, with the assistance of his two brothers who remained in Macclesfield, bought out Murray's interest and continued the business alone. The following year he bought the building in which his machinery stood and continued to increase his facilities. In 1850, having thoroughly established his business here and wanting to increase his knowledge of manufacturing methods elsewhere, he went to Europe and visited the principal manufactories of France, Italy, and Switzerland. A fair specimen of Ryle's establishment was the manufacture of a large flag that waved over the Crystal Palace during the World's Fair in New York City in 1855. About that time, he bought the romantic valley and heights surrounding the Passaic Falls and the following year expended large sums of money enhancing their already magnificent beauty. At that time Paterson had no public park, so Ryle purchased a grand park and opened it to the people of Paterson.

The city of Paterson at this time had no water service, so John Ryle, after procuring the necessary legislative authority through a charter granted to the Passaic Water Company, built the reservoir now known as the lower reservoir in the Falls Park grounds. He proceeded to lay the necessary mains through the principal streets of the city. The water for the reservoir which supplied these mains was taken from the Passaic River, behind the Old Gun Mill, and pumped to the reservoir by the means of an old plunger pump. Ryle was the founder of and first president of the Passaic Water Company.

In 1855, Ryle formed a partnership with his nephew, William Ryle of England. After about two years, his nephew withdrew, and John Ryle continued the business alone for a number of years. About 1866, the firm of John Ryle & Co., was formed - John C. Ryle, son of his brother Reuben in England, became a partner, and a large and successful business was carried on by them in the Murray Mill until 1869.

== Mayor of Paterson ==
John Ryle had by this time gained great popularity throughout the city. Though he had never before allowed himself to be put forward as a candidate for any public office, he succumbed to his friends' urgings and consented in the spring of 1869 to become a candidate for the Mayor of Paterson, New Jersey. He was elected by the largest majority that any candidate had received up to that time.

While John Ryle served as Paterson's mayor, he designed the coat of arms for the city which depicted a young man planting a mulberry bush. According to popular legend, silk worms are fond of mulberry plants, and given Ryle's association with the silk industry, the image was adopted and is still used today.

== The Murray Mill Fire ==
On 10 May 1869, the Murray Mill, together with a large and costly amount of silk and a complete plant of improved machinery, was burned up in a few hours. The property destroyed in this fire was estimated to have been worth $600,000.00, and there was not a dollar of insurance upon it.

John Ryle's capital was so much impaired by this fire that he found it impossible to resume without financial aid. His friends came to his assistance, and the Ryle Silk Company was organized and rebuilt the mill.

The new Murray Mill was completed in 1870, and Ryle theorized that a one-story mill lighted from the top would possess superior advantages in the way of light. This theory proved correct, and the Murray Mill was admitted to be the best lighted mill in Paterson, and, as the light only comes in from the north, the operatives are not inconvenienced by direct sun rays.

Supposedly, the day after the fire, as John Ryle was looking at the ruins, the late George Jackson walked up to him and said, "Well, John, you've got a hard blow. I guess you'll need some help," and putting his hand in his pocket, Jackson pulled out a huge roll of bills, thrust them in John Ryle's hand, and said, "That will help a little, and you can pay me back when you are able." When Ryle took the money to the bank, the sum was found to be $30,000.00. Later, when George Jackson got into trouble, Ryle did all he could to get him out of the difficulty.

The Ryle Silk Manufacturing Company began manufacturing operations in 1870, but in a few years, John Ryle had become by purchase the sole owner of the stock.

In 1877, he organized the Pioneer Silk Company, the stock of which represented his business and was held by himself and the members of his family. From then on the business continued under this name.

In the spring of 1885, Ryle opened negotiations with some capitalists of Allentown, Pennsylvania, who built a mill upon favorable terms. The throwing department of the Pioneer Silk Company was then relocated there. Weaving was also added to the Allentown plant.

Also, in 1885, Ryle received a medal for the silk flag he wove for the Exhibition Building in New York.

Ryle was also a pioneer in the efforts to secure protection to American industry, and his face and form were familiar in the halls of Congress well before lobbying became as entrenched as it is today.

It was claimed that while others reaped golden harvests from the field in which he labored, John Ryle paved the way for their successes, and more than any other man is entitled to the credit of having been the pioneer in the silk industry in America.

== Marriage and family ==
In 1841, Ryle married Sarah Morfitt (1825–1867), the daughter of William and Hannah Morfitt of Lancashire, England. Nine children were born to John and Sarah Ryle, namely, Reuben Ryle (1842–1916), William Ryle (1845–1906), Sarah Ryle (1847–1851), Peter Ryle (1851–1893), Annie Ryle (1853–1857), Jemima Ryle (1858–1899), John Ryle Jr. (1860–1886), Thomas M. Ryle (1863–1922), and Charles Storrs Ryle, who died in infancy in 1866.

Reuben Ryle, the eldest son, was the chief operating officer in the Ryle family silk companies. When a branch of the Pioneer Silk Company opened in Allentown, Pennsylvania, in 1886, Reuben Ryle went to that city to manage the company. He died in Allentown in 1916.

William Ryle was more interested in banking than in silk manufacturing. He was a collector of art, and financed the career of noted landscape artist Julian Rix from California. William Ryle died of Bright's Disease in 1906, shortly after retiring as President of the Silk City Bank.

Peter Ryle channeled his interests in silk manufacturing and banking also, but also went on to become a corporation attorney and set up a law practice with Eugene Stevenson in Paterson. Peter Ryle later went on to own one of Paterson's original newspapers, the Paterson Morning Call. He died of typhoid in 1893 at the age of 42.

Jemima Ryle went on to marry Augustus Roberts, a successful tobacco manufacturer. She died shortly after their marriage in 1899, aged 41.

John Ryle Jr. worked briefly with his family in the silk industry before being sent out to Allentown to assist his brother Reuben in running the family business. He died in Allentown six months after having arrived there, in 1886, aged 26, of typhoid fever.

Thomas M. Ryle, the last surviving child of John and Sarah Ryle, worked briefly in the silk industry, managed the Pioneer Silk Company, but then turned most of his attention to banking and real estate. He purchased a tract of land in present-day Woodland Park, New Jersey where he built an estate called Ryle Park. Ryle Park later became a popular recreation area around the dawn of the 20th century. He served as a Passaic County Freeholder before ill health forced him to retire at an early age. The last of the original silk family Ryles, Thomas M. Ryle died in 1922 at the age of 59.

== Later life and death ==
In 1887, John Ryle returned to Macclesfield, Cheshire, England, in the company of his only surviving daughter, Jemima. After several months of revisiting the sites he had not seen since his youth, he took ill at the hotel where he was staying. After recovering from what appeared to be a common cold, on the 6th of November, 1887, John Ryle had a stroke while dressing for Sunday church services and died in the arms of his daughter. He was 70 years old. At the request of his family, John Ryle's body was returned to his adopted home of Paterson, where he was laid to rest in Cedar Lawn Cemetery, Paterson, New Jersey, one of the most beautiful Victorian cemeteries in the United States. A massive obelisk was later erected over his grave on the hilltop and a bronze bust fitted into the monument and positioned in the direction of the city of Paterson.

John Ryle's children later took charge of his extensive real estate holdings in the city of Paterson and formed the John Ryle Real Estate Association, which acted as a holding company for the family's assets. The company was officially dissolved in the 1940s but was later reincorporated and is still owned and operated by the descendants of John Ryle.
