= John Scarpati =

American photographer (born 1960)

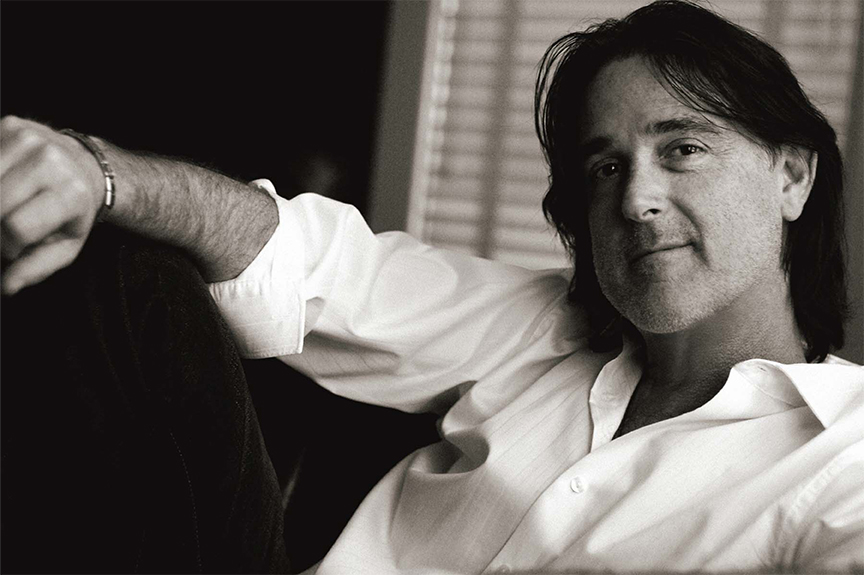
- John Scarpatji
- Born: June 29, 1960 (age 66); Great Bend, Kansas
- Known for: Photographer
- Notable work: Fishbone; Look What the Cat Dragged In; Hooked; Cherry Pie; One Day It Will Please Us to Remember Even This; Tight Rope; Folklore and Superstition
- Website: scarpati.com

John Scarpati (born June 29, 1960) is a professional photographer whose photography has appeared on hundreds of album and CD covers for bands and individual musicians. He is also the owner of Scarpati Studio, a photography studio that does photography and layouts for advertising campaigns, some of which have won national and regional awards. Scarpati has produced two books based on his photography: Cramp, Slash, & Burn: When Punk and Glam Were Twins and Eyes Wide Open. The first major solo art exhibit of Scarpat's work was in 1991 at Midem – Palais des Festivals in Cannes, France. The exhibit was a dye transfer print series. Scarpati's work has also appeared in publications such as the New York Times and Rolling Stone Magazine.

Because of his extensive photography work with so many bands in Hollywood the 1980s, as well as the production of his book Cramp, Slash, & Burn: When Punk and Glam Were Twins, Alarm Magazine has referred to Scarpati as The Anthropologist of the Sunset Strip.

== Career ==
=== Music Industry ===
The majority of Scarpati's photography work has been done in the music industry, having worked on hundreds of album covers and photo shoots across different genres. He got his break at a recording studio in Sherman Oaks, CA where he met Journey lead-singer Steve Perry who was recording his first solo album. Scarpati didn't immediately recognize Perry and recalled later that he was "... driving home (from the recording studio) and ‘When The Lights Go Down’ (Lights by Journey) comes on and I thought, ‘Holy shit, that’s Steve Perry I was just talking to.'" Perry made good on a promise to stop by Scarpati's studio the following day for what originally was intended to be a shot for the inside sleeve of his new album. Ultimately, Scarpati's work became the iconic cover shot for Perry's Street Talk album. Scarpati has since worked with many famous musical artists, such as Rush, Def Leppard, Warrant and Kenny Rogers.

He has also worked for Michael Jackson, Sherman Halsey, Delicious Vinyl, Dwight Yoakam, and Hugh Syme.

Because of his extensive work with the band Fishbone, Scarpati's photos were featured in the documentary Everyday Sunshine. In addition, one of Scarpati's photos of the band was sent to the Smithsonian's National Museum of African American History and Culture, which also has a collection of artifacts from the band.

=== Advertising ===
In his work through his company Scarpati Studio and other advertising firms, Scarpati has worked as a photographer or art director on a number of advertising campaigns for corporate clients. His artistic approach has won a number of awards, including one national ADDY award and two regional ADDY awards.

A partial list of Scarpati's Corporate clients include Bridgestone, Firestone, One Systems, Honda, AKG Microphones, Hunter Fans, Tequila Rose, Vantage Bowling, Fuzion, Paramount Studios, and English Eccentrics. In addition, his cover for the New York Dolls album One Day It Will Please Us To Remember Even This was used in an iPod Nano advertising campaign.

== Books ==
Scarpati has produced two books based on his photography work. This first, called Eyes Wide Open, is a collection of unusual and artistic images from his work. The Second is called Cramp, Slash, & Burn: When Punk and Glam Were Twins, and focuses on Scarpati's work in the Hollywood music scene in the 1980s.

=== Eyes Wide Open ===
The photography artwork in Eyes Wide Open began as an art show exhibit in alternative venues, such as clubs, bars, and hotels. While there may appear to be no obvious cohesive theme to the book, the concept is a collection of fine art prints on a wide array of Substrates. The collection contains a number of artistic examples of the photographer's work and showcases his creativity.

=== Cramp, Slash, and Burn: When Punk and Glam Were Twins ===
Cramp, Slash, & Burn: When Punk and Glam Were Twins is a collection of Scarpati’s photos from the Punk and Glam music industry in Hollywood during the 1980s. The photographs have been cleaned and digitized and the original film was wet drum scanned and digitally remastered to produce high quality images. The book is produced in a 12x12 format to mimic the size of traditional album covers. In addition, life size images of memorabilia from the period, including tick stubs, trinkets, and an authentic can of Aquanet from the time period. The text inside the book is written by band members and others who were a part of the scene at the time. The artwork from the book premiered at La Luz de Jesus Galley in Los Angeles and continues to be on display at various venues around the country.

The book won a Mohawk award and earned Scarpati the title "Anthropologist of the Sunset strip from Alarm Magazine, which said, “As a photographer, John Scarpati is well known for his work on album covers, each a dynamic and living piece of art. During the 1980s in Los Angeles, he was the music photographer, an anthropologist of the Sunset Strip, his lens documenting the fashion, sounds, and faces in the era of outrageous musical fashion." The Indie Reader, Culture Catch, and Felt and Wire also praised the accuracy of the book in documenting the era and scene.

== Album cover art ==
Chronological list of John Scarpati's album cover art.

Year	Artist	Album	Role
1984	Steve Perry	Street Talk	Photography
1985	Fishbone	Fishbone	Photography
1985	Tex & The Horseheads	Life's So Cool	Photography
1985	Various	The Enigma Variations	Photography
1985	Stryper	Soldiers Under Command	Photography
1985	Stryper	Reason for the Season	Photography
1986	T.S.O.L	Revenge	Photography
1986	Fishbone	In Your Face	Photography
1986	Poison	Look What the Cat Dragged In	Photography
1986	Eyes	Eyes	Photography
1986	The Unforgiven	The Unforgiven	Photography
1987	Bitch (band)	The Bitch is Back (album)	Photography
1987	Redd Kross	Neurotica	Photography
1987	Dramarama	Box Office Bomb	Photography
1988	L.A. Guns	L.A. Guns	Photography
1988	Kix	Blow My Fuse	Photography
1988	Social Distortion	Prison Bound	Album Design
1988	Oingo Boingo	Boingo Alive	Photography
1988	Various Artists	A Town South of Bakersfield, Vol 1	Photography
1989	Warrant	Dirty Rotten Filthy Stinking Rich	Photography
1989	Kingdom Come (German band)	In Your Face	Photography
1989	Michael Monroe	Not Fakin' It	Photography
1989	Dramarama	Stuck in Wonderamaland	Photography
1989	Rush	Presto	Photography
1989	Babylon A. D.	Babylon A. D.	Photography
1989	Bonfire (band)	Point Blank	Photography
1989	Fates Warning	Perfect Symmetry	Photography
1990	Magnum	Goodnight L.A.	Photography
1990	Rush	Chronicles	Photography
1990	Warrant	Cherry Pie	Photography
1990	Hurricane	Slave to the Thrill	Photography
1990	The Northern Pikes	Snow in June	Photography
1990	Alias	Alias	Photography
1990	Blowfly	Twisted World of Blowfly	Photography
1990	Electric Angels	Electric Angels	Photography
1990	Social Distortion	Social Distortion	Photography
1991	Rush	Roll the Bones	Photography
1991	Great White	Hooked	Photography
1991	Fates Warning	Parallels	Photography
1991	Kix	Hot Wire	Photography
1991	Bad English	Backlash	Photography
1991	The Storm	The Storm	Photography
1991	Armored Saint	Symbol of Salvation	Photography
1991	Aldo Nova	Blood on the Bricks	Photography
1991	Me Phi Me	One	Photography
1991	Dramarama	Vinyl	Photography
1991	The Scream	Let It Scream	Photography
1992	Warrant	Dog Eat Dog	Photography
1992	21 Guns	Salute	Photography
1993	Dramarama	Hi-Fi Sci-Fi	Photography
1994	Steve Perry	For the Love of Strange Medicine	Photography
1995	Bill Miller	Raven in the Snow	Photography
1995	Marshall Chapman	It's About Time	Photography
1995	Philip Claypool	A Circus Leaving Town	Photography
1996	Diamond Rio	IV	Photography
1996	Dramarama	The Best of Dramarama: 18 Big Ones	Photography
1996	Warrant	The Best of Warrant	Photography
1996	Al Anderson	Pay Before You Pump	Photography
1996	Jason and the Scorchers	Clear Impetuous Morning	Photography
1997	Eddie Rabbitt	Beatin’ the Odds	Photography
1997	Scorpions	Deadly Sting: The Mercury Years	Photography
1997	Rick Altizer	Blue Plate Special	Photography
1998	Steve Perry	Greatest Hits + Five Unreleased	Photography
1998	The Thompson Brothers Band	Blame It on the Dog	Photography
1998	Pam Tillis	Every Time	Photography
1998	Eddie Rabbitt	Songs from Rabbittland	Photography
1998	The Insyderz	Fight of My Life	Photography
1999	Brooks & Dunn	Tight Rope	Photography
1999	Jetboy	Lost and Found	Photography
2000	The Kentucky Headhunters	Songs from the Grass String Ranch	Photography
2000	Ray Price	Prisoner of Love	Photography
2000	The Sky Kings	From Out of the Blue	Photography
2001	Rush	Chronicles/ Moving Pictures	Photography
2001	Danni Leigh	Divide and Conquer	Photography
2002	Oingo Boingo	20th Century Masters – The Millennium Collection	Photography
2003	Social Distortion	Greatest Hits	Photography
2003	Buddy Jewell	Buddy Jewell	Photography
2003	Jamie Lee Thurston	I Just Wanna Do My Thing	Photography
2003	Janis Ian	Working Without a Net	Photography
2004	Brad Cotter	Patient Man	Photography
2004	Restless Heart	Still Restless	Photography
2004	Lane Turner	Wanting More	Photography
2005	Jo Dee Messina	Delicious Surprise	Photography
2005	Hank Williams, Jr.	That's How They Do It in Dixie	Photography
2006	New York Dolls	One Day It Will Please Us to Remember Even This	Photography
2006	Mechanical Birds	The Possibility of Flight	Photography
2007	Social Distortion	Greatest Hits	Photography
2007	Hydrogyn	Deadly Passions	Photography
2007	Randy Kohrs	Old Photograph	Photography
2007	Clay Walker	Fall	Photography
2008	De Novo Dahl	Move Every Muscle, Make Every Sound	Photography
2008	Black Stone Cherry	Folklore and Superstition	Photography
2009	Steadlür	Steadlür	Photography
2009	Doyle and Debbie	Performing all their top hits to the very best of their ability	Photography
2009	Korby Lenker	Lovers and Fools	Photography
2010	Randy Kohrs	Quicksand	Photography
2012	Craig Morrison	Craig Morrison	Photography
2012	Deborah Allen	Hear Me Now	Photography
2012	Fishbone	Every Day Sunshine	Photography
2012	Redd Kross	Researching The Blues	Photo editing
2012	Korby Lenker	Korby Lenker	Photography
2014	Lee Ann Womack	The Way I’m Livin’	Photography

== Awards and notable achievements ==
=== Gold and Platinum records ===
- Steve Perry – Street Talk
- Poison – Look What the Cat Dragged In
- L.A. Guns – L.A. Guns
- Great White – Hooked
- Warrant – Dirty Rotten Filthy Stinking Rich
- Warrant – Cherry Pie
- Rush – Roll The Bones
- Kix – Blow My Fuse
- Rush – Presto
- Brooks & Dunn – Tight Rope
- Buddy Jewell – Buddy Jewell

=== Achievements and recognition ===
- 1984 – Scarpati's 1st album cover to go Platinum – Steve Perry / Street Talk: Columbia
- 1989 – Shot 1st music video – Tone Lōc / Wild Thing for Delicious Vinyl /camera operator DP
- 1990 – Juno Award – Best album cover – Rush / Presto – Atlantic
- 1991 – Worst album cover – Rolling Stone Magazine – Warrant Cherry Pie – Columbia
- 1992 – Juno Award – Best album cover – Rush / Roll the Bones – Atlantic
- 2005 – Honda Ad Campaign featured in Luerzer's Archive
- 2006 – iTunes podcast – interview with Scarpati by light source
- 2007 – Silver Addy "national" Design CD/DVD packaging – Mechanical Birds
- 2008 – Silver Addy – photography print Campaign "local" – De Novo Dahl – CD packaging
- 2008 – Apple iPod Nano "TV & Print" New York Dolls cover featured in advertising campaign
- 2009 – Shutterbug Magazine – feature article (March) Pro's Choice
- 2010 – Featured article PDN magazine – Scarpati Rocks the House – Legends of Photography Issue<
- 2011 – 2 full page spread – Sports Illustrated swimsuit edition – Bridgestone Tires Campaign
