= Chris Carter (American musician) =

American disc jockey (born 1959)

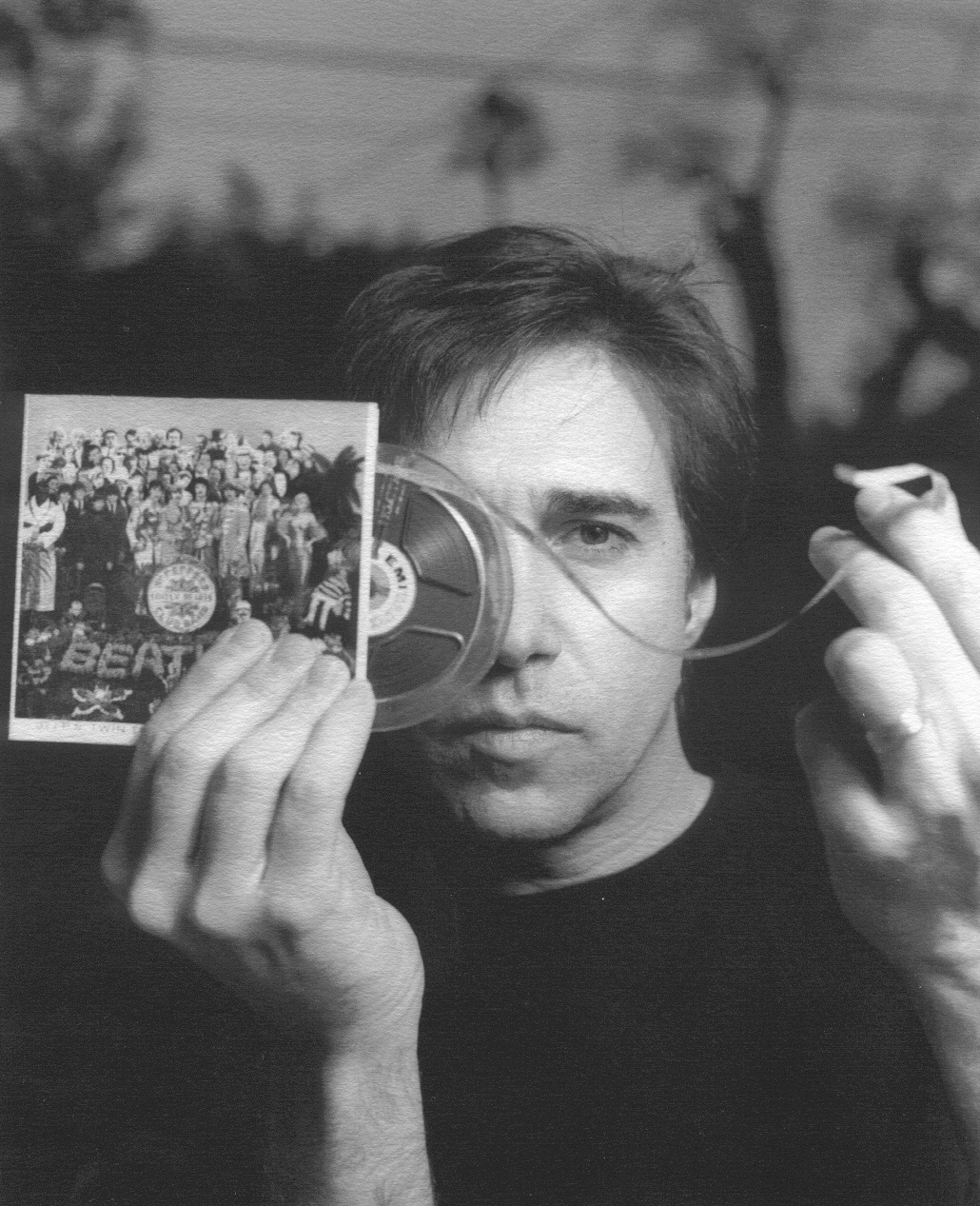
- Carter, 2003

Background information
- Born: Chris Paul Carter; September 2, 1959 (age 66); Los Angeles, California, U.S.
- Origin: Los Angeles
- Occupations: Music producer, disc jockey
- Instrument: Bass
- Years active: 1982–present

Chris Paul Carter (born September 2, 1959) is an American disc jockey and music/film producer based in Los Angeles.

Carter started his music career as a founding member and bass player with alternative rock/power pop band Dramarama. After Dramarama originally split in 1994, Carter formed QM Management to manage the pop group Wondermints.

Until September 2006, KLSX aired Carter's Breakfast with the Beatles, America's longest-running Beatles-based radio show, on which he played almost nothing but Beatles material and commented upon the history of the group for as long as four hours every week. In November 2006, the show moved to its new Los Angeles home, KLOS-FM, which bills itself as "L.A.'s Only Classic Rock Station Since 1969," and can be heard every Sunday from 9 am to 12 noon PT.

In September 2008, Carter started a new version of Breakfast with the Beatles for Sirius XM Satellite Radio, which was broadcast (9 AM-noon ET repeating again at midnight ET) on the Underground Garage channel, both Sirius 21 and XM 21. In December 2008, Breakfast with the Beatles debuted its new website.

In April 2013, Carter began a new show on Sirius/XM, "Chris Carter's British Invasion". Breakfast with the Beatles, with Chris Carter, now takes place one Sunday every month at the Kobe Steak House in Seal Beach, California.

As a producer, Carter supervised and produced the music for the film Mayor of the Sunset Strip, a rock documentary about influential Los Angeles disc jockey Rodney Bingenheimer of KROQ-FM. In 2003, the film won "Best Documentary" in the Santa Barbara Film Festival, and was nominated for Best Documentary by the Independent Spirit Awards.

== Career ==
=== Musician: Dramarama 1982–1994 ===
What is now Dramarama dates back to a group that first coalesced at Wayne Hills High School in Wayne, New Jersey. After graduating in 1977, Chris bought a record store called Looney Tunez Records in Wayne, where he and several friends practiced playing live music in the basement after hours. In 1982, Chris and childhood friend John Easdale formally formed a power pop band called Dramarama, featuring Mark Englert and Peter Wood on guitar and Jesse Farbman on drums. After relocating to Los Angeles, Dramarama had an enduring career through the 1980s and early 1990s, recording nine albums. Their 1985 debut, Cinéma Vérité, yielded the hit single "Anything, Anything (I'll Give You)," which became Dramarama's most recognizable song and for years was a staple of alternative radio airplay. The song was a number-one hit on KROQ, and today is cited as one of the most requested songs in the station's history.

Chris's contributions to the band included playing bass guitar, producing, songwriting, arranging and personally designing all album artwork/promo materials. Dramarama's many television appearances included Late Night with David Letterman, The Dennis Miller Show, MTV's Alternative Nation, 120 Minutes (as guest hosts), two live performances on The Joe Franklin Show, and their first-ever public performance on New Jersey's local Public-access television cable TV variety program The Uncle Floyd Show in 1982. In 1992, Dramarama received a Los Angeles Music Award for "Best Modern Rock Band" and then-current album Vinyl was voted "Album of The Year." However, both music business challenges and widespread interest in Seattle's emerging yet enormously popular grunge sound made things difficult for the group, which disbanded in 1994. They reunited again—without Carter—in 2004 and still perform nationally.

Between the years 1987 and 1999, Chris recorded for and/or with members of the Rolling Stones, New York Dolls, The Replacements, Tom Petty & The Heartbreakers, Blondie, Love, and The Pixies, both with and without Dramarama. In June 1997, he played bass guitar for Mike Myers (as Austin Powers) on the MTV Movie Awards, which aired in more than 10 countries around the world. Chris also briefly rejoined Dramarama for VH1's Bands Reunited reality show in February 2004. Singer/songwriter Easdale has since re-formed Dramarama with Englert and Wood, and the band continues recording and touring today.

=== Artist management: 1985–present ===
Chris established QM Management in early 1995. The company has represented two Los Angeles based acts in the past, the Wondermints, and The Negro Problem (as well as singer Stew's solo projects) in the past. Both groups have been critically acclaimed in the pages of the Los Angeles Times, Musician, Q, SPIN, and MOJO. Rolling Stone chose the Wondermints as one of its "10 Groups to Watch Out For in 1999,” and actor/producer Mike Myers hand-selected the Wondermints to write the title track for his 1997 film Austin Powers: International Man of Mystery. The Wondermints are currently Beach Boy Brian Wilson's backing band.

=== On the Air: 1989–present ===
Carter has been an on-air radio personality since the late 1980s, when he first appeared on KROQ filling in for Rodney Bingenheimer and co-hosting KROQ artist specials with him. From 1996 to 1997, he hosted "Sony's Siren Spotlight" interview show, broadcast worldwide and featuring in depth interviews with hundreds of Sony artists, ranging from Ozzy Osbourne to Pearl Jam. From August 1997 through December 1999, he hosted his original show "The Chris Carter Mess,” a four-hour specialty show on Los Angeles radio station Modern Rock Y107. "The Mess" also aired in the midwest on WOXY-FM. After a Y107 format change in January 1999, "The Chris Carter Mess" moved to LA's Channel 103.1, where it aired weekly through February 2001. Meanwhile, in 1999, Carter was honored by (now-defunct) BAM Magazine as one of the BAM 100, which recognized "The 100 Most Influential Californians in the Music Industry."

Until September 2006, Carter hosted “Breakfast with the Beatles” on 97.1 Free FM (formerly KLSX-FM) in Los Angeles, where it was heard every Sunday morning from 10 a.m. until noon. Billed as the longest-running Beatles show in America (premiering in 1976), "Breakfast with the Beatles" was also the highest-rated weekend music show in Los Angeles. As host, Carter interviewed ex-Beatles Paul McCartney, George Harrison (recorded for a Capitol Records promo CD, this turned out to be his last interview before his death in 2001), Ringo Starr and Pete Best. The McCartney interview can be seen in Paul's “Back in the US” film and DVD.

In September 2006, the show was placed on hiatus by KLSX (which has an all-talk format). This marked the (temporary, as it turned out) end of a 23-year run in Los Angeles, as the show was founded by Deirdre O'Donoghue and hosted by her until her death in 2001. The last KLSX show aired September 3, 2006—the day after Chris Carter's 47th birthday. After that, fans of the show could hear it commercial-free on "Free 2 HD," KLSX's HD2 channel. (Information on how to buy a radio for this and other secondary radio stations can be found here.)

In November 2006, KLOS picked up the show, and expanded it to 3 hours (8 AM to 11 AM). It is now heard from 9 AM to 12 PM. The show has since retained its high ratings, usually ranking No. 1 in its timeslot.

On September 14, 2008, Chris joined forces with "Little Steven" Van Zandt and Sirius XM Satellite Radio and is now heard on the Underground Garage channel (Sirius 21 and XM 21). The show airs Sundays 9AM to Noon (ET) and rebroadcasts Sunday at midnight (ET)

In 2008 Carter became the voice of two of Air New Zealand's in flight radio show's – ZROC and Arena Rock stations.

In November 2008, “Breakfast with the Beatles” was recognized by the City of Los Angeles for 25 years of broadcasting.

In December 2008, “Breakfast with the Beatles” debuted its new web site.

In April 2013, Carter started hosting a new show on Sirius/XM Ch. 21, "Chris Carter's British Invasion," which airs on Sundays, 9 AM ET with repeat broadcasts at 12 MID ET.

Breakfast with the Beatles, with Chris Carter, now takes place one Sunday every month at the Kobe Steak House in Seal Beach, California.

On May 18, 2017, Sirius XM Satellite Radio premiered The Beatles Channel on Ch. 18, and “Breakfast with the Beatles” was moved to this station, where it became a daily show, airing from 8 AM to 11 AM ET.

=== Music writer: 1989–present ===
In addition to serving as associate editor for Music Confidential from 1992 to 1994, Chris has written freelance features and reviews for the following publications:

- Creem
- BAM Magazine
- Exposure
- LA Reader
- Los Angeles Times
- Yeah Yeah Yeah

== Discography (as performer and producer) ==
- Comedy (1984, EP, Questionmark)
- Cinéma Vérité (1985, Fr. New Rose Records)
- Box Office Bomb (1987, Questionmark/Chameleon)
- Stuck in Wonderamaland (1989, Chameleon)
- Looking Through... (1990, Bent Backed Tulips, Fr. New Rose Records)
- Live in Wonderamaland (1990, promo-only EP, Chameleon)
- Live at the China Club (1990, EP, Chameleon)
- Vinyl (1991, Chameleon/Elektra)
- Vinyl (1992, EP, Chameleon/Elektra)
- The Days of Wayne and Roses (1992, fan club release, 1000 copies)
- The Mess (1992, The Mess-Carter/Mullaney side project, Fr. New Rose Records)
- 10 from 5 (1993, Chameleon)
- Hi-Fi Sci-Fi (1993, Chameleon/Elektra)
- Hi-Fi Sci-Fi/10 From 5 (1993, 2-CD set, Chameleon/Elektra)
- Cinéma Vérité...Plus (1995, Rhino)
- Box Office Bomb...Plus (1995, Rhino)
- Looking Through... (1988, Bent Backed Tulips, eggBERT)
- 18 Big Ones (1996, Elektra/Rhino)

== Discography (as producer) ==
- Atomic Boy - "Love and Revolution" (1991, Hipnotic)
- Traci Lords – "Love Never Dies" – Pet Sematary Two Soundtrack (1992, Radioactive)
- The Fizzy Bangers – Look Ma No Talent (1995, Macola)
- Blockbuster: A Glitter Glam Experience (2000, compilation, Conspiracy)
- All Things Must Pass: A Conversation with George Harrison (2001, Capitol)
- Stew – The Naked Dutch Painter...and Other Songs (2001, SMilE). Note: named Entertainment Weekly's 2002 Album of the Year.
- Mayor of the Sunset Strip Soundtrack (2004, SHOUT!FACTORY/Sony)
- "This Is Rodney Bingenheimer" – Mayor of the Sunset Strip Soundtrack (2004, SHOUT!FACTORY/Sony)
