= Ampage (band) =

American hard rock band

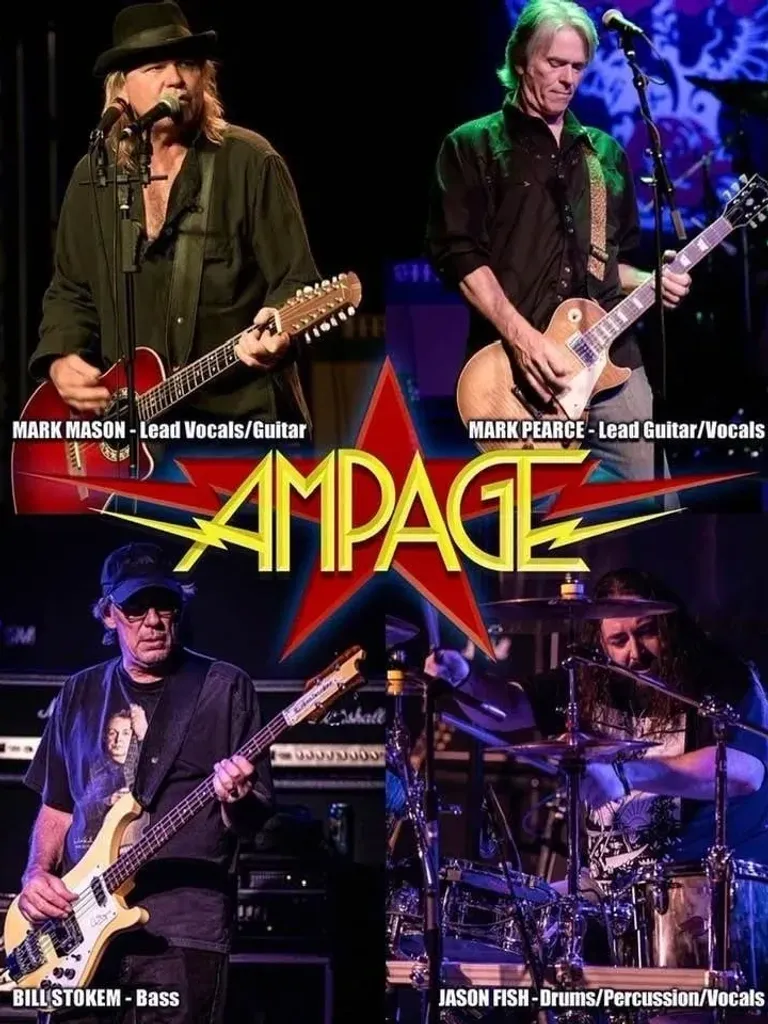
- Ampage live 2016–2023

Background information
- Origin: Los Angeles
- Genres: Glam metal; hard rock
- Years active: 1978–present
- Label: Iron Works, Higher Source
- Members: Mark Mason; Bill Stokem; Mark Pearce; Jason Fish
- Past members: Brian Burwell; Craig Beck; Billy Vaughn; Earl Slick; Michael Kroeger; Loren Molinare; Chris Campbell; Mark Englert; Jason Carroll; Ladden Pierce; Henry Stone; Punky Peru; Peter Allen; Mark Englert
- Website: ampage.com

Ampage is an American hard rock band from Los Angeles formed in 1978. Over the years, its members included musicians such as Earl Slick, who also worked as a lead guitarist for David Bowie, and Mark Englert of Dramarama. The band played in Sunset Strip clubs such as Whisky in the 1980s glam metal scene. The band's lead singer Mason formed Rockers against Pay-to-Play (RAPP) in 1989 to protest some Los Angeles clubs' pay-to-play practices.

As of 2018, the band had released seven albums and nine movie soundtracks. In 2023, a documentary called Falling Higher: The Story of Ampage was released to tell the story of the history of the band. Alongside the documentary, a soundtrack album featuring twenty-five Ampage songs was also released early in 2023.

== History ==
Ampage was founded in 1978 by Mark Mason and Michael Kroeger. Ampage became part of the 1980s glam metal scene in Los Angeles. The band played at Sunset Strip clubs such as Whisky and Troubadour.

In 1981 the band included Mason, Henry Stone, Punky Peru and Peter Allen. In 1982, Stone and Peru left to form the band Peru Crue, which morphed into Damien when former Ozzy Osbourne bassist Don Costa joined. In 1983, after briefly playing in the very first lineup of Leatherwolf, Peru would reunite with Allen in the metal band Witch.

The band released a self-titled album Ampage on cassette tape in 1988, which included tracks such as a song about nuclear war "D-Day" and a song about life in American schools at the time called "School of Hard Knox". Also in 1988, they released an album titled Champagne and Caviar, which was produced by Ironworks Records. The lineup was then Mason (vocals), Ladden Pierce (bass), Craig Beck (guitar) and Mark London (drums).

In 1989, Ampage's lead singer Mark Mason founded the organization Rockers Against Pay to Play (RAPP), a coalition of bands based in Los Angeles who protested against the "pay-to-play" practices of Sunset Strip clubs who charged bands fees in order to be able to perform at those venues.

In February 1997, the band put out an album titled Iron Horse, which was distributed by Navarre. The album combines rock and blues styles. Mason took over bass and acoustic guitar duties in addition to lead vocals, drums were handled by a returning Mike Kroeger and guitar by Jason Carroll. Tom Mullaney of Dramarama played keyboards on the album. Guitarist Earl Slick played on a song that was a cover of John Lennon's "Gimme Some Truth", which was included as a bonus track on the album's final release and CD. Little Caesar members Loren Molinare (guitar) and Ron Young (vocals) also contributed to the album. Jeff Klaven of Krokus produced the album together with Duane Baron.

For their 2001 album "Falling Higher", Peru and Allen rejoined to contribute on one song each and so did onetime Salty Dog vocalist Jimmi Bleecher.

In 2013, Mark Pearce joined the band on lead guitar and vocals, and Bill Stokem joined on bass. Drummer Kroeger died on January 31, 2016, and was first replaced by drummer Chris Campbell and soon after by Jason Fish on drums. The band toured the United States following the release of their 8th album in 2014.

As of 2018, Ampage had released seven albums, nine movie soundtracks, and had toured internationally and across the United States. The band had performed with Eric Clapton, Def Leppard, Michael Monarch of Steppenwolf, Tommy Shaw of Styx, John Easdale of Dramarama, and John Taylor of Duran Duran.

In 2021 the band released their album Season in Hell. The latest release features their drummer since 2016, Jason G. Fish.

Early in 2023, a documentary about Ampage was released, titled Falling Higher: The Story of Ampage. The film, distributed by Freestyle Digital Media, documents the band's career starting from 1978. Alongside the documentary, an album of the same name featuring twenty-five Ampage songs was also released early in 2023.

== Reception ==
In 1988, The Signal described Ampage's self-titled debut album as "loud" and said that "most of their words deal with sex, fast women and fast cars". In February 1997, Adrian Well of The Music Paper wrote that Ampage's album Iron Horse was an "interesting, solid outing" for the band. At the time of a May 1997 tour stop by the band in Nebraska, Ampage's live performances were described by journalist L. Kent Wolgamott of the Lincoln Journal Star as an attempt to "merge the long-haired '80s rock audience with the short-haired '90s variety." In 2021, Ken Morton of the music magazine Highwire Daze described the album Season in Hell as Ampage's "finest effort to date." In 2023, Chris O'Connor of Fireworks Rock & Metal wrote in his review of the album Falling Higher: The Story of Ampage that the twenty-five Ampage songs included in that album provided "plenty of styles and feels to enjoy".

== Discography ==
=== Selected albums ===
Year	Title	Label
1988	Champagne and Caviar	Ironworks
1997	Iron Horse	Higher Source Records
2001	Falling Higher	(No label)
2007	Future Days Gone By	Mason Music
2016	Bridge of Souls	Mason Music
2021	Season In Hell	Mason Music
