= Live at the China Club =

Live album by Dramarama
- Released: 1990
- Recorded: The China Club
- Genre: Rock
- Length: 22:54
- Language: English
- Label: Chameleon
- Producer: Val Garay

Professional ratings
Review scores
Source	Rating
AllMusic	4/5 stars

Live at the China Club is a live album by the alternative rock group Dramarama, released in 1990.

== Track listing ==
1. "Anything, Anything (I'll Give You)"
2. "Last Cigarette"
3. "Some Crazy Dame"
4. "Spare Change"
5. "Private World"
6. "Would You Like"

== Personnel ==
- Mr E. Boy - Electric Lead Guitar, Feedback
- Pete Wood - Electric Rhythm Guitar
- Jesse - Drum Kit
- Chris Carter - Bass
- John Easdale - Voice, Acoustic Guitar

With:

- Tom Mullaney - Keyboard, Bar Stool
