= Anything, Anything (I'll Give You) =

- 1990 US retail cassette single; the US CD release was promo-only

Single by Dramarama

from the album Cinéma Vérité
- B-side: "I Wish I Was Your Mother"
- Released: 1985
- Recorded: 1985
- Genre: Alternative rock
- Length: 3:25
- Label: Chameleon Records
- Songwriter: John Easdale
- Producer: Dramarama

Dramarama singles chronology
"You Drive Me" (1983)	"Anything, Anything (I'll Give You)" (1985)	"It's Still Warm" (1985)

"Anything, Anything (I'll Give You)" is a 1985 song by the alternative rock band Dramarama released as the first single from their debut album Cinéma Vérité. Written by John Easdale in the mid-1980s, "Anything, Anything" features a steady beat and lyrics about the breakdown of his marriage.

Although initially unsuccessful, the song saw commercial success after being played on KROQ and featuring on the A Nightmare on Elm Street 4: The Dream Master soundtrack. "Anything, Anything" remains one of the band's most famous songs and is a live favorite.

== Background ==
"Anything, Anything (I'll Give You)" was written by Dramarama singer John Easdale in the period from 1984 to 1985, a time he recalled as "definitely not a high point in [his] life." The song was written as a reflection on Easdale's deteriorating marriage.

It was written about my ex-wife and I. We lived in a one-room apartment downstairs from where the rest of the band lived in a two-bedroom apartment in Lodi, New Jersey. Couples often tell me it's "their" song, and I'm flattered that they feel the emotion and passion of it, but I am always a bit reluctant to mention that it is essentially an ode to a bitter break-up.

— John Easdale

Lyrically, the song mentions drinking and pills to reference partying, with the latter being used to rhyme with "hundred dollar bills." The song features the same beat throughout, a feature Easdale explains was meant as "a way to keep the anguish constant."

== Release ==
Dramarama were largely unknown until Los Angeles DJ Rodney Bingenheimer began regularly playing "Anything, Anything" on KROQ. The song garnered phone requests and was added to the station's rotation shortly thereafter. The success prompted Dramarama to move to Los Angeles; the track remains one of the most requested songs in the history of Los Angeles radio station KROQ. Easdale later described the song's success as a "miracle."

=== Music video ===
Two versions of the "Anything, Anything" music video were ultimately released. The first version, featuring clips of Edie Sedgwick from the underground 1972 film Ciao! Manhattan interspersed with the clips of the band, was initially rejected by MTV due to the use of the word "pills" (which the band later rerecorded as "chills"). A second video was filmed in 1990 to accompany a re-released single by Chameleon Records.

== Track listing ==
1989 single
No.	Title	Length
1.	"Anything, Anything"	3:44
2.	"I Wish I Was Your Mother"	3:58

1990 single
No.	Title	Length
1.	"Anything, Anything (I'll Give You)" (Sonic Love Mix)	3:13
2.	"Anything, Anything (I'll Give You)" (Live version from the China Club EP)	3:47
3.	"Anything, Anything (I'll Give You)" (LP Version)	3:21

== Reception and legacy ==
"Anything, Anything" remains one of the band's most popular songs. Easdale reflected on this, "I love that people I have never met know the song. I love hearing strangers perform cover versions. I love that it is still getting played on the radio, on the internet and elsewhere. I love that I still get to sing it and that people still come to hear us play it in concert. I love that 30 plus years later, outlets like NOISEY are asking me questions about it. I have written many, many songs, but it is the only one that has really had a life of its own."

The song remains a live favorite for the band; according to Easdale, "It's a fun song to play, the crowd more often than not sings along, the best is when the audience is singing louder than me. 'Anything, Anything' is the only song that has consistently been performed at nearly all Dramarama live shows since 1985."

The single was featured on the A Nightmare on Elm Street 4: The Dream Master soundtrack. It was played during a party scene on an episode during the first season of Felicity and a short clip of it was also featured in an episode of Entourage. Since 2009 the song has been the name and title of Rich Russo's free form radio show Anything Anything with Rich Russo where the song opens the show each week. The song also features in the 2014 film Two Night Stand, as well as the 2003 film 11:14.

American talk show host Ellen DeGeneres has said it is her favorite song. For DeGeneres' 50th birthday, Ellen DeGeneres Show DJ Stryker surprised her by bringing Dramarama to the show to perform the song live.

== Charts ==
Chart (1991)	Peak position
Australia (ARIA Charts)	85

== Cover versions ==
- In 1992, punk band Y-Fronts from Hannover, Germany covered the song on their EP Y-Fronts (Nasty Vinyl)
- In 1994, punk band Big Boy Tomato covered the song on their EP Hormones and Hangovers
- In 1994, rock band The Kaper covered the song on their album From Now On...
- In 1997, grunge band Grey Daze covered the song on their album ...No Sun Today.
- In 2000, rock band Buckcherry covered the song for the Road Trip movie soundtrack.
- In 2005, punk band Heads Held High covered the song on their EP Building Up To The Breakdown
- In 2006, punk band Lucky Boys Confusion covered the song for the EP How to Get Out Alive.
- In 2016, alt rock band Beach Slang covered the song for the EP Here I Made This For You: Vol 1.
- In 2018, psychobilly band The Thirsty Crows covered the song for the album Hangman's Noose.
