= Vinyl (Dramarama album) =

Studio album by Dramarama
- Released: October 15, 1991
- Recorded: 1990
- Genre: Alternative
- Length: 50:44
- Label: Elektra
- Producers: Dramarama, Don Smith

Dramarama chronology
Stuck in Wonderamaland (1989)	Vinyl (1991)	Hi-Fi Sci-Fi (1993)

Singles from Vinyl
- 1. "Haven't Got a Clue" Released: 1991; 2. "What Are We Gonna Do?" Released: 1991

Vinyl is the fourth album by alternative rock group Dramarama, released in 1991. It is a celebration of classic rock, with Mick Taylor, formerly of the Rolling Stones, playing guitar on all tracks.

== Critical reception ==
Professional ratings
Review scores
Source	Rating
AllMusic	4.5/5 stars
Robert Christgau	B+

Alternative Rock wrote that the sound of the album was "steeped in the Southern rock tradition of R&B riffery, bluesy guitar leads, and a whiff of C&W."

== Track listing ==
All songs written by John Easdale, except for where noted.

1. "Until the Next Time" – 3:29
2. "Haven't Got a Clue" – 4:08
3. "What Are We Gonna Do?" – 3:59
4. "Classic Rot" – 4:25
5. "Memo from Turner" (Mick Jagger, Keith Richards) – 3:46
6. "Train Going Backwards" – 6:17
7. "I've Got Spies" – 4:34
8. "In Quiet Rooms" – 2:40
9. "Ain't It the Truth" – 3:50
10. "Tiny Candles" – 6:32
11. "(I'd Like to) Volunteer, Please" – 5:51
12. "Steve Is Here" - 1:08 [hidden track indexed as tracks 12-99]

== Personnel ==
- John Easdale – lead vocals, backing vocals, tambourine
- Mr. E – lead guitar, rhythm guitar
- Pete Wood – rhythm guitar
- Chris Carter – bass
- Brian Macleod – drums, percussion
- Mick Taylor – lead & slide guitar (tracks 4, 11)
- Benmont Tench – piano & organ (tracks 3, 5, 10)
- Jim Keltner – drums (track 11)
- Lisa Haley – fiddle (track 4)
- Tommy T – acoustic guitar, keyboard, backing vocals
