= Cinéma Vérité (album) =

Studio album by Dramarama
- Released: November 1, 1985
- Recorded: 1982–1985
- Genre: Alternative rock, power pop
- Length: 38:04
- Label: Chameleon
- Producer: John Easdale/Chris Carter

Dramarama chronology
Cinéma Vérité (1985)	Box Office Bomb (1987)

Cinéma Vérité is the first album by the alternative rock group Dramarama, released in 1985. Although Dramarama was an American group, from New Jersey, the album was originally released by New Rose Records of France, and in America on Question Mark Records. It was later picked up for release by Chameleon Records, a small independent record label based in California.

Edie Sedgwick appears on the album cover.

== Critical reception ==
Professional ratings
Review scores
Source	Rating
AllMusic	4.5/5 stars
Robert Christgau	A−
The Encyclopedia of Popular Music	4/5 stars
Sounds	4.5/5 stars

Robert Christgau wrote that the album demonstrates "a band that rocks without hyphens--in other words, plenty."

== Track listing ==
All songs written by John Easdale, except where noted.

Side one

1. "Visiting the Zoo" - 4:03
2. "Questions?" - 3:16
3. "Scenario" - 4:18
4. "Anything, Anything (I'll Give You)" - 3:25
5. "Femme Fatale" (Lou Reed) - 3:17

Side two

1. "Candidate" (David Bowie) - 3:19
2. "Some Crazy Dame" - 3:48
3. "Etc." - 3:53
4. "Transformation" - 3:26
5. "All I Want" - 2:26
6. "Emerald City" - 3:01

1995 CD reissue bonus tracks

12. "Punishment (Demo)" - 5:50
13. "Some Crazy Dame (Demo Version)" - 3:44
14. "Etc. (Demo Version)" - 3:38
15. "Want Her to Stay (Demo)" - 4:00
16. "Pretend (Demo)" (Easdale, Tony Arata) - 2:07
17. "You Drive Me" (Chris Carter) - 2:51
18. "A Fine Example" - 2:10
19. "If Looks Could Kill (Demo)" - 2:58

== Personnel ==
- John Easdale – vocals
- Mr. E Boy – guitar
- Peter Wood – guitar
- Chris Carter – bass guitar
- Theo Ellenis – keyboards
- Jesse Farbman – drums
- Muddy Shoes – piano (track 5)
- Ken Moutenot – drums (tracks 9,10)
- Ron Machuga – drums (track 5)

== Cover versions/soundtracks ==
The song "Anything, Anything (I'll Give You)" was covered by the Linkin Park frontman Chester Bennington's former band Grey Daze on their album ...no sun today. The California rockers Something Corporate have performed it live, although they have never released it on a studio recording. Recently, this song was sung by Storm Large, a contestant on the reality show Rock Star: Supernova. The band Lucky Boys Confusion recorded a cover version of the same song on their EP How to Get Out Alive. A cover version of the song performed by Buckcherry is used in the credits for the film Road Trip.

Dramarama's original version of "Anything, Anything (I'll Give You)" was also used in the 1988 New Line Cinema film A Nightmare on Elm Street 4: The Dream Master, although it is not available on the soundtrack, but was issued as a 7-inch single promoting its appearance in the film.
