= Wayne Hills High School =

High school in Passaic County, New Jersey, US

Location
- 272 Berdan Avenue; Wayne, Passaic County, New Jersey 07470; United States
- 40.969097°N 74.241027°W

Information
- Type: Public high school
- Motto: Rock Solid Tradition
- Established: 1966
- School district: Wayne Public Schools
- NCES School ID: 341728004966
- Principal: Michael Rewick
- Faculty: 119.3 FTEs
- Grades: 9 -12
- Enrollment: 1,181 (as of 2023–24)
- Student to teacher ratio: 9.9:1
- Colors: Maroon, White
- Athletics conference: Big North Conference (general); North Jersey Super Football Conference (football)
- Team name: Patriots
- Rival: Wayne Valley High School
- Publication: The Patriot Press
- Website: www.wayneschools.com/o/whhs

Wayne Hills High School is a four-year comprehensive community public high school, in Wayne, in Passaic County, in the U.S. state of New Jersey, in the New York metropolitan area. The school serves students in ninth through twelfth grades as one of the two secondary schools that are part of the Wayne Public Schools, the other being Wayne Valley High School.

As of the 2023–24 school year, the school had an enrollment of 1,181 students and 119.3 classroom teachers (on an FTE basis), for a student–teacher ratio of 9.9:1. There were 64 students (5.4% of enrollment) eligible for free lunch and 24 (2.0% of students) eligible for reduced-cost lunch.

== History ==
The school opened in September 1966 as the district's second high school. With the opening of the new facility, the district's original secondary school was renamed Wayne Valley High School.

== Awards, recognition and rankings ==
In its listing of "America's Best High Schools 2016", the school was ranked 222nd out of 500 best high schools in the country; it was ranked 35th among all high schools in New Jersey and 18th among the state's non-magnet schools.

In the 2011 "Ranking America's High Schools" issue by The Washington Post, the school was ranked 64th in New Jersey and 1,902nd nationwide. In Newsweek's May 22, 2007 issue, ranking the country's top high schools, Wayne Hills High School was listed in 1102nd place, the 34th-highest ranked school in New Jersey.

The school was the 65th-ranked public high school in New Jersey out of 339 schools statewide in New Jersey Monthly magazine's September 2014 cover story on the state's "Top Public High Schools", using a new ranking methodology. The school had been ranked 35th in the state of 328 schools in 2012, after being ranked 51st in 2010 out of 322 schools listed. The magazine ranked the school 60th in 2008 out of 316 schools. The school was ranked 70th in the magazine's September 2006 issue, which included 316 schools across the state.

Schooldigger.com ranked the school tied for 61st out of 381 public high schools statewide in its 2011 rankings (an increase of 18 positions from the 2010 ranking) which were based on the combined percentage of students classified as proficient or above proficient on the mathematics (91.4%) and language arts literacy (96.4%) components of the High School Proficiency Assessment (HSPA).

In September 2025, senior Santiago Gonzalez became the first student from Wayne Hills to be elected to the National Executive Council of the FBLA.

== Sports ==
The Wayne Hills High School Patriots compete in the Big North Conference, which is comprised of public and private high schools in Bergen and Passaic counties, and was created following a reorganization of sports leagues in Northern New Jersey by the New Jersey State Interscholastic Athletic Association. In the 2009-10 school year, the school competed in the North Jersey Tri-County Conference, which was established on an interim basis to facilitate the realignment. Before the realignment, Wayne Hills had competed in the North Bergen Interscholastic Athletic League (NBIAL) as the only team outside Bergen County participating in the league. With 953 students in grades 10-12, the school was classified by the NJSIAA for the 2019–20 school year as Group III for most athletic competition purposes, which included schools with an enrollment of 761 to 1,058 students in that grade range. The football team competes in the Freedom Red division of the North Jersey Super Football Conference, which includes 112 schools competing in 20 divisions, making it the nation's biggest football-only high school sports league. The school was classified by the NJSIAA as Group III North for football for 2024–2026, which included schools with 700 to 884 students.

Wayne Hills interscholastic sports teams include: volleyball, soccer, tennis, football, marching band, field hockey, basketball, cheerleading, bowling, wrestling, skiing, fencing, ice hockey, track and field, swimming, cross country running, lacrosse, gymnastics, baseball, softball and golf.

The school participates as the host school / lead agency in a joint ice hockey team with Wayne Valley High School. The co-op program operates under agreements scheduled to expire at the end of the 2023–24 school year.

The gymnastics team won the overall state championship in 1981.

The varsity baseball team won the Passaic County Tournament championships in both 2000 and 2009. The team won the 2009 tournament with an 11-0 win in the championship game vs. Pompton Lakes High School.

The boys' track team were 2003 county, league and state champions.

In 2007, Wayne Hills was county champions in boys and girls tennis. In 2012, the boys tennis team won the Passaic County Tournament for the eighth consecutive year.

The 2008 boys' volleyball team was undefeated and went on to winning the Passaic County championship.

The boys' golf team won the county tournament in 2008, 2013 and 2015.

The girls' fencing team won the Passaic County championships in 2009.

In 2009, the boys' swim team won the Passaic County championship, the second tournament ever held. In 2010, the girls and boys won the Passaic County championship. In the same season, both teams won their division of the Tri-County league. The boys finished with an undefeated regular season. Both teams competed in and lost in the first round of the state tournament.

In 2010, the boys lacrosse team won the inaugural Passaic County Tournament. They would go on to win again in 2017, 2018 and 2019, becoming the only team to win back-to-back championships and then three-peat. They have won more county lacrosse championships than any other team in Passaic County.

The girls' ski team won back-to-back state championships in 2011 and 2012.

=== Ice hockey ===
In the 2017-18 season, Wayne Hills and Wayne Valley joined to create an all-Wayne co-operative ice hockey team. The team made it to the semifinals of the 2018 NJSIAA New Jersey Boys Ice Hockey Public A tournament, where they lost 3-2 to Hunterdon Central Regional High School.

=== Field hockey ===
The field hockey team won the North I Group IV state sectional title in 1978, 1980, 1982, 1983, 2008 and 2009. The team won the Group IV state championship in 1982, defeating Shawnee High School in the tournament final by a score of 2-0.

=== Football ===
The Wayne Hills football team won the North I Group III state sectional championship in 2002, 2004-2008, 2010 and 2011, and won the North I Group IV title in 2016 and 2018. Led by Coach Chris Olsen, the team won eight state sectional championships in the ten years through 2011, reigning as the two-time defending champs of North I Group III. The team accumulated a 65-6 record during the seven seasons through 2008.

Wayne Hills and Wayne Valley have participated in an annual rivalry since 2009, which Wayne Hills leads 11-2 through the 2017 season. NJ.com listed the rivalry in the 24th spot on their 2017 list "Ranking the 31 fiercest rivalries in N.J. HS football".

In 2002, the varsity team won their first North Jersey I Group III title in the school's history by defeating Ramapo High School 19-0. This was also the first undefeated football season. Additionally, several members of this senior class became professional athletes. Tight end Greg Olsen went on to play college and professional football.

From 2004 to 2009, the team won 55 consecutive games. During the winning streak, the team won five state sectional championships, including four perfect 12-0 seasons. The Wayne Hills 55-game win streak came to an end with a 17-15 loss to Saint Joseph Regional High School in October 2009. The streak is the second-longest in New Jersey high school football history, behind only to Paulsboro High School's 63-game win streak.

The 2004 team finished the season with a 10-2 record after winning the North I Group III state sectional title, defeating Ramapo High School by a score of 38-28 in the semis and then topping Northern Valley Regional High School at Demarest in the tournament final by a score of 17-16.

The team was in the 2005 playoffs as the top seed in the North I, Group III bracket, and won the first two rounds, beating #8-seed Teaneck High School 40-6 and number-four Ramapo High School 41-13, and then crushing third-seeded Parsippany Hills High School by a score of 46-0 in the sectional finals.

In 2006, the Patriots came in seeded second in the North I, Group III bracket, and won the first two rounds, beating 7th-seed Northern Valley Regional High School at Old Tappan 37-7 and 6th-seed Passaic Valley Regional High School 33-0. In the state finals, played at Rutgers University on December 2, 2006, Wayne Hills defeated fourth-seeded Parsippany Hills High School 23-12, the second consecutive year the two faced each other in the finals. The football team was ranked 3rd behind #1 Don Bosco Prep and #2 St. Peter's Prep in New Jersey. The team was ranked 7th in the East region by USA Today in their final 2006 Super 25 prep football regional rankings.

Wayne Hill's football team finished 12-0 in the 2007 season, defeating Wayne Valley High School in the North I Group III state sectional championship game played at Giants Stadium by a final score of 27-7. The win was the team's 40th consecutive win, and its fourth consecutive sectional title.

In 2008, Wayne Hills played Lakeland Regional High School at Giants Stadium and won the North I Group III sectional title with a final score of 35-6, making them 52-0 in the previous four seasons, and giving them their fifth consecutive sectional title. As of December 9, 2008, Wayne Hills was ranked 81st on the Rivals.com list of the top 100 high school football teams in the nation. The only other New Jersey teams then on the list were Shawnee High School (88th) and Don Bosco Prep (17th).

In 2009, Wayne Hills lost to their longtime rival, Ramapo High School, in the North I, Group III state sectional championship at Giants Stadium in East Rutherford. The loss to Ramapo ended a streak of 17 consecutive playoff victories extending from the first round of the 2004 playoffs through the 2009 semifinal game and a string of 62 consecutive wins in football games played against public schools statewide dating back to 2003.

In 2010, Wayne Hills won the North I Group III state championship against Northern Valley at Old Tappan in what has been called the "Miracle in the Meadowlands", taking a lateral pass on a kickoff with seconds left on the clock to win the state title by a score of 24-21. The team ended this year ranked 3rd in the top 25 best high school teams in North Jersey by The Record and its national ranking according to Max Preps was 289.

In December 2011, the New Jersey Commissioner of Education upheld the suspension of nine Wayne Hills football players who been alleged to have been involved in an October fight outside of a house party in which two students from Wayne Valley High School had been assaulted, including one who was beaten and left unconscious in a street. Though the students had been allowed to play in the first two rounds of the football playoffs, they were ruled ineligible to participate in that year's final against Old Tappan. Despite the absence of the nine from the championship game, Wayne Hills defeated Old Tappan for the second consecutive year, by a score of 15-12, the team's second consecutive North I, Group III title and its eighth title in ten years.

The Wayne Hills football program was featured in the documentary series titled Traditions, which airs on SNY. The production team followed the team around for the first week of October and attended practices and conducted interviews to showcase what the program, at its core, is about.

In Spring 2012, head coach Chris Olsen announced that he would step down as the athletic director for the 2012-13 school year and serve as head coach for the last year. The team finished with a 6-5 record and did not make an appearance in the finals, losing to Pascack Valley High School in the semi-finals by a score of 20-11, marking the first year in nine years that the Wayne Hills Patriots did not make it to the state finals.

The team won the 2016 North I, Group IV state sectional championship with a 31-24 overtime win in the tournament final against Wayne Valley High School, under head coach Wayne Demikoff.

In 2018, the team won the North I Group IV title with a 20-13 win against Northern Valley at Old Tappan and then went on to win the Group IV North Bowl by a score of 35-21 against Phillipsburg High School.

== Administration ==
The school's principal is Michael Rewick. His core administration team includes five assistant principals.

== Notable alumni ==
- Marina Alex (born 1990), professional golfer
- Chris Carter (born 1959), Sirius/XM disc jockey and producer who was one of the founding members of Dramarama
- Alex Chilowicz (born 1987), professional soccer referee who has worked in Major League Soccer and the English Football League
- Barbara Dare (born 1963), pornographic movie actress
- Nickolette Driesse (born 1994), soccer midfielder who plays for Orlando Pride of National Women's Soccer League
- John Easdale (born 1961), lead singer of Dramarama
- Mark Englert, guitarist for Dramarama
- Nicholas Kaloukian (born 2003), professional football player who plays as a forward for Armenian Premier League club Urartu
- Ryan Neill (born 1982), former NFL defensive end and long snapper
- Greg Olsen (born 1985), sportscaster and former NFL tight end
- Jessielyn Palumbo (born 1992, class of 2010), Miss New Jersey USA 2016 and beauty photographer
- Lieutenant General Guy C. Swan III (born 1954), retired United States Army officer, whose final assignment was Commanding General United States Army North (USARNORTH), at Fort Sam Houston, Texas
- Holly Taylor (born 1997), actress and dancer who performed in the Broadway production of Billy Elliot the Musical and in the FX television series The Americans
- Vikki Ziegler (born c. 1972, class of 1990), lawyer and author who was the focus of the reality television show Untying the Knot
