= Box Office Bomb (album) =

Studio album by Dramarama
- Released: 1987
- Recorded: May 18–28, 1987
- Genre: Hard rock, glam rock
- Length: 44:49
- Label: Questionmark
- Producer: Chris Carter, John Easdale, Mark Ettel

Dramarama chronology
Cinéma Vérité (1985)	Box Office Bomb (1987)	Stuck in Wonderamaland (1989)

Singles from Box Office Bomb
- 1. "It's Still Warm / Private World" Released: 1987

Box Office Bomb is the second album by the alternative rock band Dramarama.

== Critical reception ==
Professional ratings
Review scores
Source	Rating
AllMusic	4/5 stars
Robert Christgau	A−
Los Angeles Times	2.5/4 stars

Trouser Press wrote that "while Box Office Bomb suffers slightly from pressed-for-time-and-money production, 'Modesty Personified' still has plenty of Blondiesque bite, and the sextet invigorates Easdale’s vengeful frustration in 'Whenever I’m With Her' ('Sorry I bit her…') with hothouse guitar drama."

== Track listing ==
All songs written by John Easdale, except where noted.

1. "Steve & Edie" - 5:05
2. "New Dream" - 3:30
3. "Whenever I'm with Her" - 3:09
4. "Spare Change" - 3:15
5. "400 Blows" - 3:52
6. "Pumping (My Heart)" (Patti Smith, Ivan Kral, Jay Dee Daugherty) - 3:16
7. "It's Still Warm" - 3:54
8. "Out in the Rain" (Easdale, Julie Miller) - 4:13
9. "Baby Rhino's Eye" - 5:01
10. "Worse Than Being by Myself" - 5:27
11. "Modesty Personified" - 4:07

1988 CD bonus tracks (The Best of Cinema Verite)

12. "Anything, Anything (I'll Give You)" - 3:44
13. "Scenario" - 4:14
14. "Questions?" - 3:12
15. "Visiting the Zoo" - 3:55
16. "Candidate" - 3:18
17. "Some Crazy Dame" - 3:48
18. "Emerald City" - 3:00

1995 CD reissue bonus tracks

12. "Hitchhiking" - 3:10
13. "Private World (David Johansen, Arthur Kane) - 3:37
14. "Last Cigarette (Demo Version)" - 4:22
15. "Would You Like (Demo)" - 4:36
16. "Worse Than Being by Myself (Demo Version)" - 5:13
17. "It's Still Warm (Original Version)" - 6:22
