= Scarpati =

Scarpati is an Italian surname. Notable people with the surname include:

- Giulio Scarpati (born 1956), Italian actor
- Joe Scarpati (born 1943), American football player
- John Scarpati (born 1960), American professional photographer
