= Hi-Fi Sci-Fi =

Studio album by Dramarama
- Released: January 1993
- Recorded: November 21 to December 21, 1992
- Genre: Alternative
- Length: 58:57
- Label: Chameleon/Elektra
- Producer: Dramarama

Dramarama chronology
Vinyl (1991)	Hi-Fi Sci-Fi (1993)	Everybody Dies (2005)

Singles from Hi-Fi Sci-Fi
- 1. "Work for Food" Released: 1993

Hi-Fi Sci-Fi is the fifth studio album by alternative rock group Dramarama. Released in 1993, it was also their last studio album until Everybody Dies was released in 2005.

== Critical reception ==
Professional ratings
Review scores
Source	Rating
AllMusic	4/5 stars
Robert Christgau	A−
Los Angeles Times	3.5/4 stars

Robert Christgau wrote that "what's confusing, and a stroke, is that with Clem Burke pounding the skins and the band mixing and matching, it rocks louder, harder, and faster than anything they've done since going pro—or ever."

== Track listing ==
All songs written by John Easdale, except for where noted.

1. "Introduction/Hey Betty" – 4:28
2. "Work for Food" – 4:10
3. "Shadowless Heart" – 5:13
4. "Swallowed Your Cure" (Chris Carter, Tommy Mullaney) – 2:54
5. "Where's the Manual?" – 5:23
6. "Senseless Fun" – 4:39
7. "Bad Seed" – 4:02
8. "Incredible" (Carter, Easdale) – 4:18
9. "Prayer" – 4:37
10. "Don't Feel Like Doing Drugs" – 3:43
11. "Right On Baby, Baby" – 4:23
12. "Late Night Phone Call" – 5:32
13. "28 Double Secret Bonus Tracks" – 5:35

== Personnel ==
- John Easdale – Vocals, guitar, bass
- Mark Englert – Lead, rhythm and acoustic guitars
- Chris Carter – Bass
- Pete Wood – Rhythm and lead guitars
- Nicky Hopkins – Piano/organ
- Benmont Tench – Piano/Keyboards
- Clem Burke – Drums
- Astrid Young – Backing vocals
- Dwight Twilley – Backing vocals
- Sylvain Sylvain – Backing vocals
- Tommy Mullaney – Keyboard, toy piano, acoustic guitar, backing vocals
- Butch Young – Backing vocals
- Martin Tillman – Cello
- Chris Fuhrman – Guitar
