= Everybody Dies =

Everybody Dies may refer to:

== Music ==
- Everybody Dies (album), a 2005 album by Dramarama
- "Everybody Dies" (song), a 2016 song by J. Cole
- "Everybody Dies", a song by Ayreon from the album The Source (2017)
- "Everybody Dies", a song by Logic from the album YSIV (2018)
- "Everybody Dies", a song by Kim Petras from the album Turn Off the Light (2019)
- "Everybody Dies", a song by Billie Eilish from the album Happier Than Ever (2021)
- "Everybody Dies!", a song from the musical The Toxic Avenger (2008)

== Other media ==
- Everybody Dies (2000), an alternative name for the film The Unscarred
- DEFCON: Everybody Dies (2007), a video game
- "Everybody Dies" (House) (2012), an episode of the television series House
