= Ampage =

Ampage may refer to:

- Ampage (unit), a unit used to measure electric current
- Ampage (band), an American rock band
