= Michael Turco =

American magician

- Born: Michael Turco
- Occupation: Magician
- Years active: 2007 – Present
- Website: www.turcomagic.com

Michael Turco is an American magician, known for Coming Home Red Carpet Events (supporting soldiers returning home from war). He received national exposure by appearing on the sixth season of America's Got Talent on NBC in the summer of 2011.

== Early life ==
Turco was born in Wayne, New Jersey, United States. Turco attended George Washington Middle School and Wayne Valley High School before attending William Paterson University. As a child, Turco spent summers in South Jersey attending every show in Atlantic City watching magicians perform. He started with card tricks, and began performing stage shows in middle school.

== Career ==
Turco performs Magic shows throughout USA including Bally's Atlantic City.

Michael Turco starred in "Magic and Mayhem" on the Las Vegas Strip from February 15, 2012 through mid-October 2012 at the Saxe Theatre in Planet Hollywood. He also performed "Magic and Mayhem" at Six Flags: Magic Mountain from Memorial Day, 2014 through August 17, 2014.

== Awards ==
- Joseph Gabriel Performance Award 1997
- Maltese Awards at William Paterson University 2002
- Society of American Magicians Member
- International Brotherhood of Magicians Member
