= Vinyl (EP) =

EP by Dramarama
- Released: 1992
- Genre: Alternative pop, alternative rock, indie rock, rock and roll
- Length: 17:24
- Language: English
- Label: Chameleon

Vinyl is an EP by alternative rock group Dramarama. It was released in 1992.

== Track listing ==
1. "I've Got Spies" — 4:20
2. "On the Streets" — 3:06
3. "Come (To Meet Me)" — 4:12
4. "Tie Me Down Easdale" — 3:17
5. "Convenience Store" — 2:29
