= Dramarama =

American alternative rock/power pop band

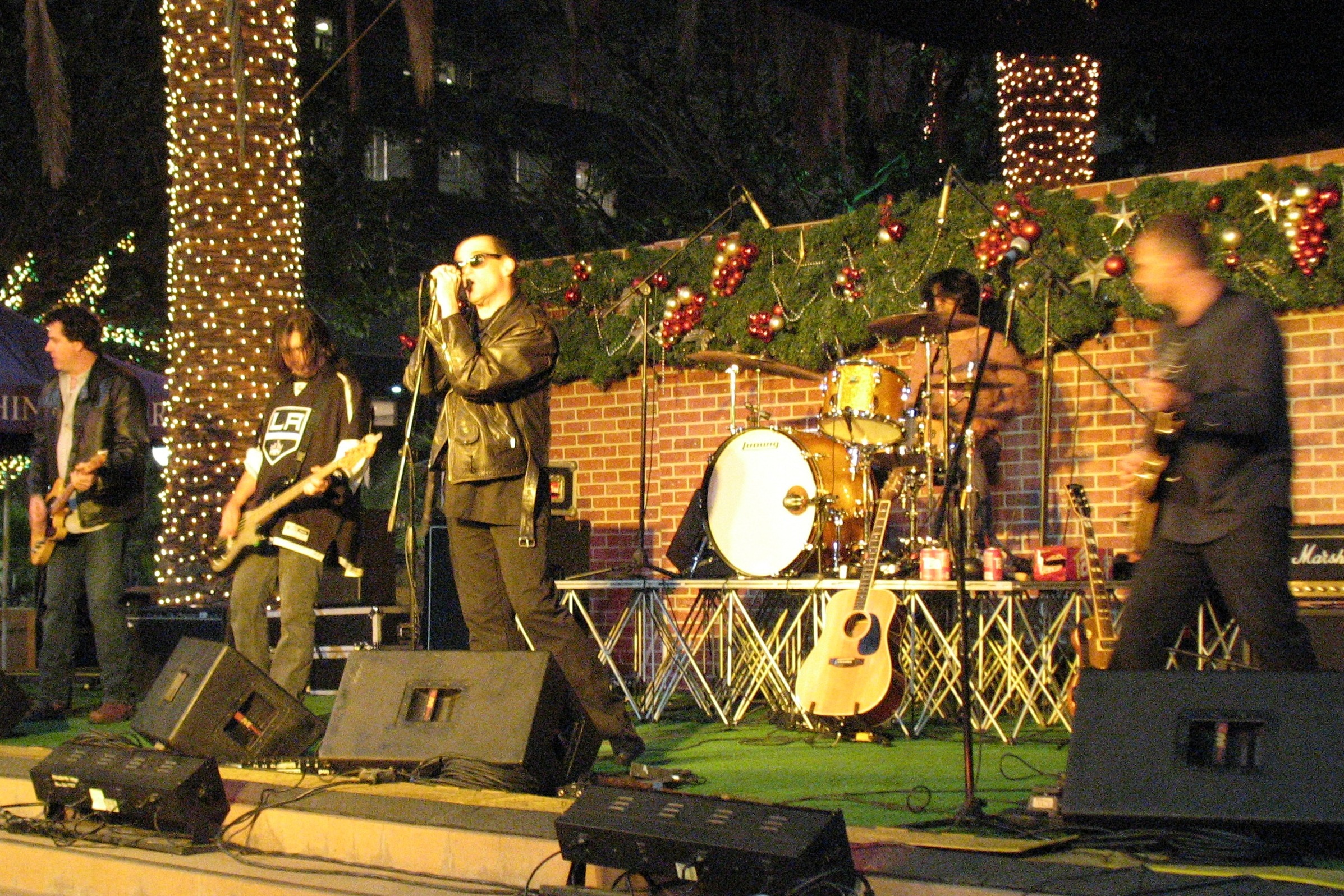

Background information
- Origin: Wayne, New Jersey, U.S.
- Genres: Alternative rock, power pop, indie rock, new wave, post-punk
- Years active: 1982–1994, 2003–present
- Labels: Binky 101, Questionmark, New Rose, Chameleon, Eggbert, Harvey Star, 33rd Street
- Members: John Easdale; Peter Wood; Mark Englert; Mike Davis; Tony Snow
- Past members: Chris Carter; Jesse Farbman; Clem Burke; Ted Ellenis; Tom Mullaney; Ronny Machuga; Ken Moutenout; Craig Ballam; Morley Bartnoff; Ray Barwick
- Website: Official website

Dramarama is an American, New Jersey–based alternative rock/power pop band, who later moved to Los Angeles. The band was formed in New Jersey in 1982 and disbanded in 1994. The band formally reunited in 2003 following an appearance on VH1's Bands Reunited.

Since 1996, an evolving lineup of the band, always fronted by singer/songwriter John Easdale, has been performing in one incarnation or another (initially billed as Easdale solo but usually joined by former Dramarama bandmates), and from then until 2003 played occasional shows in Los Angeles as well as in New Jersey. However, amid renewed interest since the episode on Bands Reunited in January 2004 and a large-scale appearance at KROQ-FM's annual Inland Invasion festival concert (attended by more than 78,000 fans) in September 2003, Dramarama then toured nationally and released a full-length CD titled Everybody Dies on October 25, 2005. Fifteen years later, they released the album Color TV.

== History ==
=== 1981–1994 ===
In 1982, Dramarama formed in the basement of Looney Tunez Records (previously known as Dirt Cheap Records) in Wayne, New Jersey, owned and operated by founding member Chris Carter. Initially the line-up consisted of singer/songwriter John Easdale, "Mr. E Boy" (Mark Englert) and Carter, later joined by Peter Wood on guitar and Ron Machuga on drums.

The band’s early lineup evolved through several short-lived projects, beginning with the high school punk group The Fucks, followed by a later incarnation called DPW (a local parody name referencing their hometown Department of Public Works), before eventually developing into Dramarama. The band emerged in North New Jersey, where at that time there was a scene with radio station WHTG 106.3 and venues such as The Stone Pony, Green Parrot and Fast Lane featuring other local bands such as Red House, Smithereens, Whirling Dervishes and The Blases. In 1982, the band released its first single, "You Drive Me", attracting some national attention.

In 1984, keyboard player Ted Ellenis and drummer Ken Moutenot (replacing Machuga) joined the band and Dramarama released their first EP Comedy, a self-funded, five-track debut that garnered both critical and unexpected cult praise in France. Moutenot was replaced by Jesse Farbman, who left the group after the band's third album to pursue mind/body purity and to obtain "philosophical and spiritual awareness". Dramarama issued its first full-length release, 1985's Cinéma Vérité on France's New Rose Records. It was re-released in the U.S. after receiving airplay on KROQ-FM radio from influential Los Angeles disc jockey Rodney Bingenheimer (who at first thought the band was French). Bingenheimer alerted Posh Boy Records at New Rose, which approved Robbie Fields' contacting the band directly in New Jersey.

One of the early radio stations to play the song "Anything, Anything (I'll Give You)" was KROQ. It was one of the station's more requested songs in 1986 and 1987, and it became one of the more requested songs in the station's history. Following the local L.A. success of "Anything, Anything", the band obtained a larger advance from Chameleon and permanently moved from New Jersey to Los Angeles. The song was featured in A Nightmare on Elm Street 4: The Dream Master and was covered for the East Timor Benefit Album.

As an expression of gratitude to both Bingenheimer and Fields, the band gave Fields their recording of the New York Dolls' song "Private World" for inclusion on the CD The Best of Rodney on The Roq, released in 1987 and re-released in 1992 through Rhino Records.

The recording sessions for Stuck in Wonderamaland produced enough material for three albums. Easdale and Carter decided to again try a foreign release. Thus, Looking Through..., a 14-song album, was released in Europe by The Bent Backed Tulips, both pseudonym and album title in reference to lyrics from the Beatles' "Glass Onion". Looking Through... was re-released in the U.S. through eggBERT Records with extra tracks, increasing the number of songs to 20.

The band then signed with Chameleon distributor Elektra and released 1991's Vinyl. Backed by a major label for the first time, Dramarama received nationwide airplay with the singles "Haven't Got a Clue" (which also was on a CD included with the Sega CD video game system in the United States) and "What Are We Gonna Do?". The album's production with Don Smith added to the success of the LP. Vinyl included contributions from Mick Taylor, Jim Keltner, Benmont Tench, and Brian Macleod of Wire Train.

After Vinyl, a limited-edition, 17-song CD titled The Days of Wayne and Roses (The Trash Tapes) was made available to members of the Dramarama fan club. It included the band's early recordings together as well as songs that were dropped from their early albums, a couple of live performances, and one song exclusive (at the time) to the disc.

The band's final release on Elektra, 1993's Hi-Fi Sci-Fi, was well received among both critics and fans. Clem Burke, who had joined the band for the Vinyl tour, appears on this album, and backing vocal contributions include Dwight Twilley and Sylvain Sylvain. After the tours, the group split.

=== 1995–2005 ===
Following two relatively quiet years after the 1994 breakup, John Easdale began performing live music again in 1996, doing shows in both New Jersey and the L.A. area. He assembled a band that he occasionally has named The John Easdale Group and has casually named it The Newcomers, featuring Dramarama's Mark Englert, as well as Peter Wood for East Coast appearances. Other Newcomers have included fellow eggBERT alum Nick Celeste (of former Bongo Richard Barone's band and once the frontman for In Color), Aimee Mann, Jules Shear, Muddy Shews, Danny Roselle, and Chris O'Hara. Easdale found steady players in Mike Davis, Tony Snow and Craig Ballam, who connected with Easdale circa 1996.

In 1998, Easdale released a solo album on the eggBERT label titled Bright Side, on which many of the tracks featured musicians with ties to both Dramarama and the Newcomers, including Mark Englert and Clem Burke, as well as Mike Davis, Tony Snow and Craig Ballam, who also contributed production and engineering skills. Before Bright Side, Easdale issued a fan-only, no-label version of the Bright Side in 1996 that contained versions of songs that made the final cut as well as some that did not. Easdale refers to it as his "blueprint" for the final collection, and fans call it the "pre-release" of Bright Side.

Following the publicity from the VH1 series Bands Reunited, their subsequent performance at KROQ's Inland Invasion, and an article in Rolling Stone that lauded their retooling of the Dead Kennedys' politically charged "California über alles" in response to Arnold Schwarzenegger's 2003 run for governor of California, Easdale decided in late 2003 the band name Dramarama should continue. The next CD (an EP) would be billed to Dramarama, titled Absolutely, 100% Made in N.J., which was recorded on a whim while Easdale and the band were on a brief tour of New Jersey in 2003. The EP's liner notes indicated that most of the seven tracks were "from the forthcoming Dramarama album Everybody Dies."

The album was released on October 25, 2005, by California-based label 33rd Street Records.

They appeared on The Ellen DeGeneres Show as Ellen DeGeneres' 50th birthday present from her DJ Ted Stryker.

=== 2006–present ===
The current lineup consists of original founding members Easdale, lead and rhythm guitar player Peter Wood (the only band member who moved back to New Jersey and still maintains a residence there), and lead guitarist Mark Englert (Mr. "E" Boy). Rounding out the band are Los Angeles–based musicians Tony Snow (of No Sugar and Shiteland Ponies) on drums, and (former Lizzy Borden member) Mike Davis on bass. In addition, Snow leads Tonio & The Change, and Davis is the bass player for both Judas Priest frontman Rob Halford's eponymous solo band Halford and metal "supergroup" Death Dealer.

The Dramarama song "Anything Anything" served as the title and theme song of New York City radio station WRXP-FM's free-form program "Anything Anything with Rich Russo". The version from Live at the China Club began each show. After the switch of format to all news on WRXP-FM, Russo's radio show was picked up on WXPK-FM and WDHA-FM, where "Anything Anything" still served as the name and the China Club version opened each show.

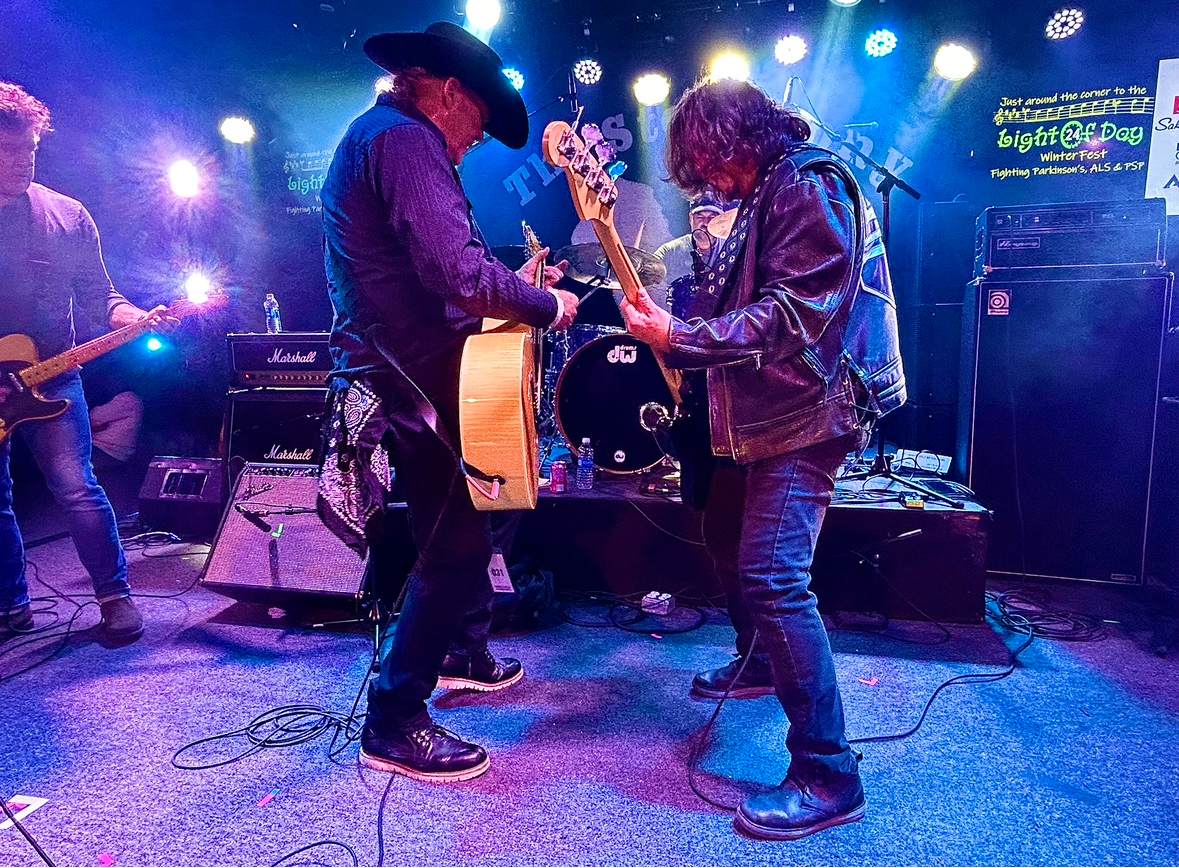
John Easdale (left) and Mike Davis perform with Dramarama at The Stone Pony on January 19, 2024 as past of the Light of Day music festival.

The band has been very active since 2005. In 2009, they played for the Troy High School Battle of the Bands. This event took place on February 3, 2009 at Plummer Auditorium, located in Fullerton, California. Also in 2009 were several shows at House of Blues venues in Texas and Southern California as well as Six Flags Magic Mountain. Dramarama returned to New Jersey for two shows in November 2009 and performed in Downtown Los Angeles and San Juan Capistrano's The Coach House in December 2009. They returned to Troy High School's Battle of the Bands in 2010 and 2011.

A special live version of "Last Cigarette" was recorded for the limited-edition, 500-pressing vinyl album Anything Anything with Rich Russo on 101.9 RXP Presents Exclusive Live Performances. In this version, the band replaces the lyric "Johnny Carson" with "Rich Russo" as an homage to the free-form DJ. The album was released April 2010.

As of 2018, Dramarama continued to perform frequently as headliners and at various festivals.

After a 15-year hiatus the band released Color TV on May 1, 2020.

=== Post-Dramarama careers ===
Original bass player/producer and Dramarama co-founder Chris Carter is currently a disc jockey in Los Angeles, where he hosts America's longest-running Beatles show, Breakfast with the Beatles, and the weekly four-hour eclectic program on the satellite radio station SiriusXM "Chris Carter's British Invasion." Carter also produced and wrote the film Mayor of the Sunset Strip, which in 2003 was nominated for Best Documentary Feature at the 19th Independent Spirit Awards and which featured members of Dramarama. After Dramarama split in 1994, Carter formed QM Management, for which he manages the pop group The Wondermints, who previously toured as Beach Boy Brian Wilson's backing band.

Drummer Jesse Farbman, a.k.a. Anant Jesse, lived in Montreal, where he taught spiritual therapeutics and maintained a private practice; he died in 2014. Former keyboard player Theodore Ellenis serves as the senior finance executive for a prominent New York City area firm focused on government arbitrage. Tom Mullaney, former keyboardist, acoustic guitar player, and backing vocalist for Dramarama from 1987 to 1994 and childhood friend of Chris Carter, died in June 2025.

== Band members ==
=== Current members ===
- John Easdale – lead vocals, guitars, cowbell
- Peter Wood – guitars
- Mark Englert – guitars
- Mike Davis – bass guitar
- Tony Snow – drums, percussion

=== Former members ===
- Chris Carter – bass guitar
- Jesse Farbman – drums, percussion (died 2014)
- Clem Burke – drums, percussion (died 2025)
- Ted Ellenis – keyboards
- Ken Moutenot – drums, percussion
- Tom Mullaney – keyboards, guitars, backing vocals (died 2025)
- Ronny Machuga – drums, percussion
- Craig Ballam – guitars, production, engineering
- Morley Bartnoff – keyboards
- Ray Barwick – harmonica

== Discography ==
=== Studio albums ===
Name	Chart	Released
Cinéma Vérité	—	November 1, 1985
Box Office Bomb	—	January 1, 1987
Stuck in Wonderamaland	—	April 1, 1989
Looking Through... (as The Bent Back Tulips)	—	January 1, 1990
Vinyl	—	October 15, 1991
Hi-Fi Sci-Fi	10 (Heatseekers Albums)	January 1, 1993
Everybody Dies	—	October 25, 2005
Color TV	—	May 1, 2020

=== Live / compilation albums ===
Name	Type	Released	Label
Play New Rose for Me	Compilation	1986	New Rose
Best of Rodney on the Roq	Compilation	1989	New Rose
Days of Wayne & Roses	Compilation	1992	New Rose
Rock'n'Rose	Compilation	1990	New Rose
Live at the China Club	Live	1990	Chameleon
Days of Wayne & Roses	Compilation	1992	Self-released
Days of Wayne & Roses	Compilation	1992	Self-released
KBCO Studio C Vol. 2	Compilation	1992	KBCO
Welcome to Our Nightmare: A Tribute to Alice Cooper	Compilation	1993	Triple X
Amongst Friends - Original Motion Picture Soundtrack	Compilation	1993	Atlantic
10 from 5	Compilation	1993	Rhino
Melody Fair	Compilation	1994	EGGBERT
Sing Hollies in Reverse	Compilation	1995	EGGBERT
The Best of Dramarama: 18 Big Ones	Compilation	October 29, 1996	Rhino
Blockbuster: A 70's Glitter Glam Rock Experience	Compilation	2000	Robison
One Step Beyond: The Best of New Wave	Compilation	2002	Rhino
Mayor of the Sunset Strip	Compilation	2003	Shout! Factory
Anything Anything with Rich Russo Exclusive Live Performances	Compilation	2010	

=== Extended plays ===
Name	Released	Record label
Comedy	May 19, 1984	Question Mark Records
Vinyl	1992	Chameleon

=== Singles ===
Year	Title	Chart position		Album
Year	Title	US Alternative Songs	AUS	Album
1983	"You Drive Me" b/w "A Fine Example", "Femme Fatale"	N/A	—	Non-album single
1985	"Anything, Anything (I'll Give You)"	N/A	—	Cinéma Vérité
1987	"It's Still Warm" b/w "Private World"	N/A	—	Box Office Bomb
1989	"Last Cigarette"	13	—	Stuck in Wonderamaland
1989	"Wonderamaland" b/w "70's TV"	—		Stuck in Wonderamaland
1989	"Anything, Anything (I'll Give You)" b/w "I Wish I Was Your Mother"	—	85	A Nightmare on Elm Street 4: The Dream Master
1991	"Haven't Got a Clue"	6	—	Vinyl
1991	"What Are We Gonna Do?"	10	60	Vinyl
1993	"Work for Food"	10	—	Hi-Fi Sci-Fi
1998	"Tie Me Down" b/w "Last of the Famous International Playboys"	—	—	Looking Through...
2003	"California über alles"	—	—	Non-album single
2005	"Physical Poetry (A-B-C-D-1-2-3)"	—	—	Everybody Dies

- "N/A" = not applicable as the US Alternative Songs chart was not introduced until 1988
- "—" = song did not chart

== Videography ==
- 70's TV (on the compilation Slipping Through the Cracks - An Uprising of Young Pacifics)
- Anything, Anything (I'll Give You) — 1987
- Last Cigarette — 1989
- Wonderamaland — 1989
- Anything, Anything (I'll Give You) — 1990
- Haven't Got a Clue — 1991
- What Are We Gonna Do? — 1992
- Work 4 Food — 1993
