= Wayne Public Schools =

School district in Passaic County, New Jersey, US

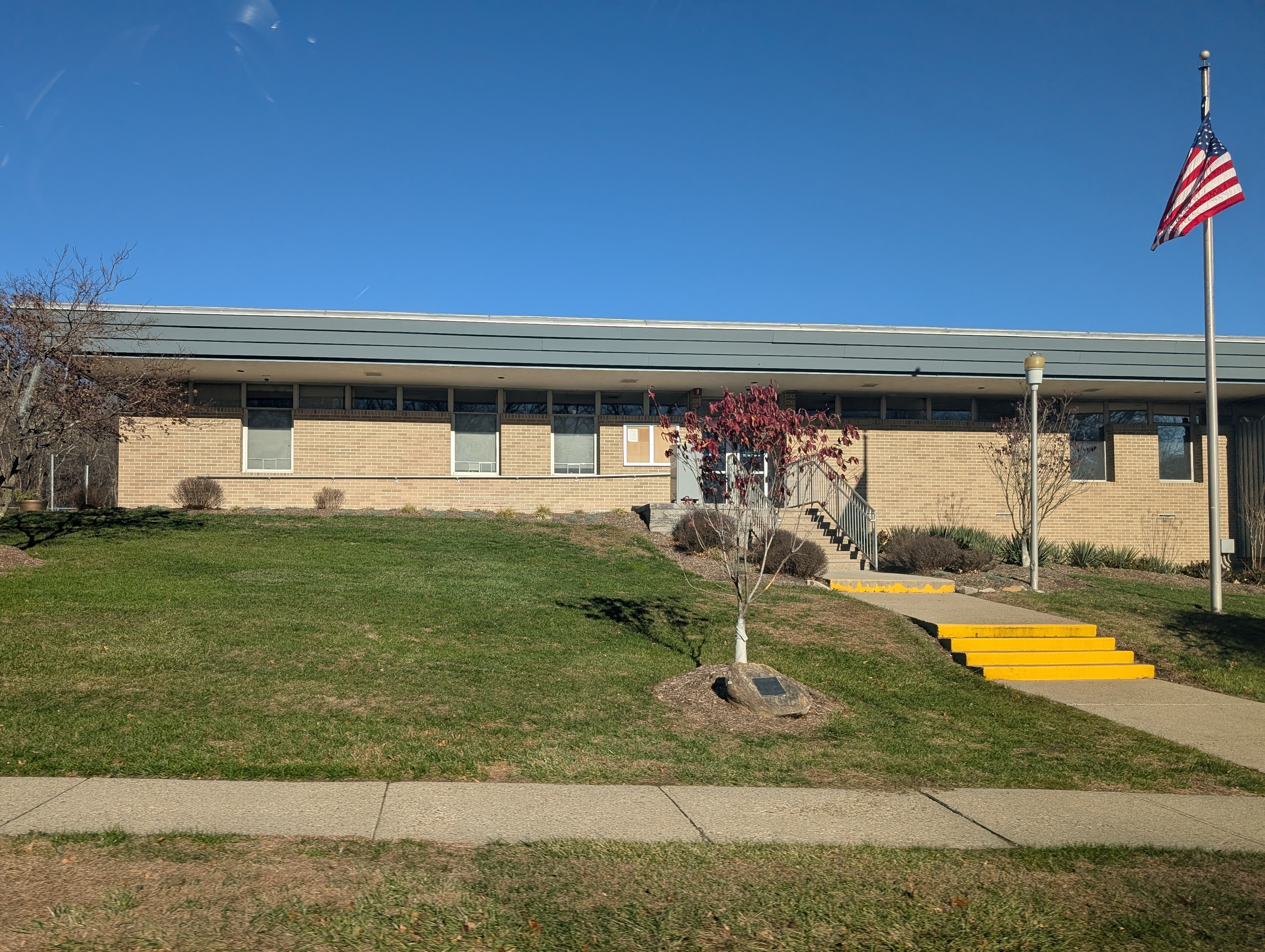
- Main administration building

Address
- 50 Nellis Drive Wayne, Passaic County, New Jersey, 07470; United States
- Coordinates: 40.927419°N 74.243897°W

District information
- Grades: PreK-12
- Superintendent: David Cittadino
- Business administrator: Daisy Ayala
- Schools: 15

Students and staff
- Enrollment: 7,746 (as of 2022–23)
- Faculty: 677.0 FTEs
- Student–teacher ratio: 11.4:1

Other information
- District Factor Group: GH
- Website: www.wayneschools.com
| Ind. | Per pupil | District spending | Rank (*) | K-12 average | %± vs. average |
|---|---|---|---|---|---|
| 1A | Total Spending | $18,615 | 54 | $18,891 | −1.5% |
| 1 | Budgetary Cost | 15,370 | 67 | 14,783 | 4.0% |
| 2 | Classroom Instruction | 8,798 | 55 | 8,763 | 0.4% |
| 6 | Support Services | 2,669 | 78 | 2,392 | 11.6% |
| 8 | Administrative Cost | 1,424 | 48 | 1,485 | −4.1% |
| 10 | Operations & Maintenance | 1,891 | 74 | 1,783 | 6.1% |
| 13 | Extracurricular Activities | 410 | 99 | 268 | 53.0% |
| 16 | Median Teacher Salary | 66,180 | 59 | 64,043 |
Data from NJDoE 2014 Taxpayers' Guide to Education Spending. *Of K-12 districts with more than 3,500 students. Lowest spending=1; Highest=103

The Wayne Public Schools are a comprehensive community public school district that serves students in pre-kindergarten through twelfth grade from Wayne, in Passaic County, in the U.S. state of New Jersey, in the New York City metropolitan area.

As of the 2022–23 school year, the district, comprised of 15 schools, had an enrollment of 7,746 students and 677.0 classroom teachers (on an FTE basis), for a student–teacher ratio of 11.4:1.

The district is classified by the New Jersey Department of Education as being in District Factor Group "GH", the third-highest of eight groupings. District Factor Groups organize districts statewide to allow comparison by common socioeconomic characteristics of the local districts. From lowest socioeconomic status to highest, the categories are A, B, CD, DE, FG, GH, I and J.

== History ==
Before the district opened its own secondary school in 1952, students from Wayne had attended Pompton Lakes High School. The school was called "Wayne High School" until Wayne Hills High School opened in September 1966, at which time the word "Valley" was added to the original school's name in order to differentiate between the two.

== Awards and recognition ==
John F. Kennedy School was recognized by Governor Jim McGreevey in 2003 as one of 25 schools selected statewide for the First Annual Governor's School of Excellence award.

== Schools ==
Schools in the district (with 2022–23 enrollment data from the National Center for Education Statistics) are:

Preschools

- Preakness Early Childhood Center (198 students; in PreK)
  - Patricia Monaco, principal

Elementary schools

- Randall Carter Elementary School (309; K–5)
  - Kimberly Thompson, principal
- Theunis Dey Elementary School (435; K–5)
  - Jacob Cavins, interim principal
- James Fallon Elementary School (373; K–5)
  - Ethan Maayan, principal
- John F. Kennedy Elementary School (377; K–5)
  - Kolleen Myers, principal
- Lafayette Elementary School (311; K–5)
  - Melissa Avgerinos, principal
- Packanack Elementary School (406; K–5)
  - Kenneth Doolittle, principal
- Pines Lake Elementary School (387; K–5)
  - Lydia Cooper, principal
- Ryerson Elementary School (237; K–5)
  - Debbie Foti, principal
- Albert P. Terhune Elementary School (373; K–5)
  - Melissa Coleman, principal

Middle schools

- Schuyler-Colfax Middle School (621; 6–8)
  - Heather Weinstein, principal
- George Washington Middle School (508; 6–8)
  - Jack E. Leonard, principal
- Anthony Wayne Middle School (665; 6–8)
  - Courtney Duin-Savastano, principal

High schools (grades 9–12)

- Wayne Hills High School (1,182; 9-12 - serving students living on and north of Ratzer Road)
  - Michael Rewick, principal
- Wayne Valley High School (1,241; 9–12 - serving students living south of Ratzer Road)
  - Kenneth J. Palczewski, principal

== Administration ==
Core members of the district's administration are:

- Mark Toback, superintendent
- William Moffitt, business administrator and board secretary

== Board of education ==
The district's board of education, comprised of nine members, sets policy and oversees the fiscal and educational operation of the district through its administration. As a Type II school district, the board's trustees are elected directly by voters to serve three-year terms of office on a staggered basis, with three seats up for election each year held (since 2012) as part of the November general election. The board appoints a superintendent to oversee the district's day-to-day operations and a business administrator to supervise the business functions of the district.
