= Jay Della Valle =

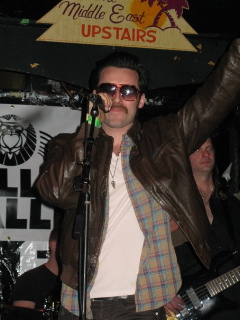
- Jay Della Valle playing at The Middle East (Cambridge, MA) in 2009

Background information
- Also known as: Jay Della Valle
- Born: Jason Christopher Della Valle; August 19, 1979 (age 46); Hackensack, New Jersey, United States
- Genres: Alternative rock, pop rock, blues, indie folk, folk rock
- Occupations: Filmmaker, singer-songwriter, musician, Actor, Event Host/MC, DJ
- Instruments: Vocals, Guitar, Harmonica
- Years active: 2003–present
- Label: Rock-A-Stache Records
- Website: www.dellavallemusic.com

Jay Della Valle (born August 19, 1979) best known for his documentary The Glorious Mustache Challenge, and for his role as Sue in the Independent Feature Film, "Mount Joy"- is an American filmmaker, recording artist, singer and songwriter.

== Early life and Current ==
Della Valle was born in Hackensack, New Jersey. He is of Italian, Irish, and Czech ancestry. He grew up in Wayne, New Jersey and attended Wayne Valley High School.

== Musical career ==
While attending New York University, Della Valle played with various bands including The Offbeats. After graduating from NYU in 2001 with a degree from the Gallatin School of Individualized Study, Della Valle recorded an independent EP called Best Years with bandmate Jon Crane and producer Chris "Gibby" Gibson (Quicksand, Rival Schools). He followed this with 2 other independent EPs before starting to record his first full-length debut album, Pink Elephants, in 2005 with producer Jon Berman (Ours, The Dandy Warhols, Avril Lavigne, Duncan Sheik). He then returned to Chris Gibson in 2008 to record Stay Gold with his band. In 2009, Della Valle toured the east coast with Stache Bash, Della Valle's own invention: a "mustache party rock n'roll tour" he cultivated from his films burgeoning following. A video for his single, Legs So Long It's Crazy, was made in early 2009. Della Valle's 2nd full-length album, The Terminology of the Situation Is.... was released in May 2011. In 2012, Jay joined up with former Della Valle keyboardist/violinist & singer Nicole DeLoi to form the Indie Folk Duo "Owls & Lions" who got their start performing at weddings. Jay's song "Head Above Water" can be heard in the 2014 Lionsgate film "My Man Is A Loser" starring John Stamos & Michael Rapaport. Jay was recently cast in the Independent Feature Film, Mount Joy- about a punk rock band from Pennsylvania his character fronts called Living Daylights. Jay Della Valle wrote all the songs for the band Living Daylights.

== Film career ==
Della Valle started acting in 1995 while still in high school. After graduating high school in 1997, he attended New York University to further pursue theatre and film opportunities. He worked on a number of independent films and theatre productions while still in college. After graduating NYU in 2001, Della Valle enrolled in the Maggie Flanigan Studio to study the Meisner technique of acting under the mentorship of Maggie Flanigan.

In 2006, Della Valle started to film his acclaimed documentary, The Glorious Mustache Challenge, which received press and attention from The Today Show, Good Morning America, Geraldo at Large, CNN, and The New York Times. "The Glorious Mustache" started when he dared a handful of friends to grow a mustache and not shave for one month. This experiment led him to have the idea to chronicle the experiences of men under 30 in their conquest to revive the "ill-fated" mustache trend. The making of the film quickly gained traction and press- garnering featured articles in Time Out New York and on the front page of The New York Times. and AM New York Upon its completion, film screenings took the form of "mustache parties" where the film would play, costumes and mustaches would be required, and inevitably, a mustache contest would be judged by Della Valle. Press from The New York Times caught the eye of Dr. Aaron Perlut and Dr. Dan Callahan, the leaders of the American Mustache Institute, who would later indoctrinate Della Valle as "Chairman Emeritus".

In 2007, Della Valle appeared on the reality show Miami Ink. While getting tattooed by tattoo artist Chris Garver, he discusses plans for his band's album in progress.

== Discography ==
Year	Title
2003	Best Years
2004	Della Valle
2005	Pink Elephants
2007	Stay Gold
2009	Legs So Long It's Crazy (Single)
2011	The Terminology of the Situation Is…
2013	Living Daylights- Roll with the Punches EP (Songs From Mount Joy)
2019	Owls & Lions- There’s a Light EP
