= Wayne Valley High School =

High school in Passaic County, New Jersey, US

Location
- 551 Valley Road; Wayne, Passaic County, New Jersey 07470; United States; 40.9308°N 74.2307°W

Information
- Type: Public high school
- Motto: "The Tribe with 'Pride'"
- Established: 1952; 74 years ago
- School district: Wayne Public Schools
- NCES School ID: 341728004964
- Principal: Jennifer Grimbilas
- Faculty: 122.5 FTEs
- Grades: 9-12
- Enrollment: 1,201 (as of 2024–25)
- Student to teacher ratio: 9.8:1
- Colors: Blue and white
- Athletics conference: Big North Conference (general); North Jersey Super Football Conference (football)
- Team name: Indians
- Rival: Wayne Hills High School
- Publication: Smoke Signals
- Website: www.wayneschools.com/o/wvhs

Wayne Valley High School is a comprehensive four-year public high school, in Wayne, in Passaic County, in the U.S. state of New Jersey. The school serves students in ninth through twelfth grades as one of the two secondary schools of the Wayne Public Schools, the other being Wayne Hills High School. The school is also accredited by the New Jersey Department of Education and has been accredited by the Middle States Association of Colleges and Schools Commission on Elementary and Secondary Schools since 1954. Wayne Valley's school colors are blue and white.

As of the 2024–25 school year, the school had an enrollment of 1,201 students and 122.5 classroom teachers (on an FTE basis), for a student–teacher ratio of 9.8:1. There were 106 students (8.8% of enrollment) eligible for free lunch and 33 (2.7% of students) eligible for reduced-cost lunch.

== History ==
Before the school opened in 1952, students from Wayne had attended Pompton Lakes High School.

The school was called "Wayne High School" until Wayne Hills High School opened in September 1966, at which time the word "Valley" was added to the original school's name in order to differentiate between the two.

== Awards, recognition and rankings ==
In its listing of "America's Best High Schools 2016", the school was ranked 417th out of 500 best high schools in the country; it was ranked 45th among all high schools in New Jersey and 28th among the state's non-magnet schools.

The school was the 91st-ranked public high school in New Jersey out of 339 schools statewide in New Jersey Monthly magazine's September 2014 cover story on the state's "Top Public High Schools", using a new ranking methodology. The school had been ranked 64th in the state of 328 schools in 2012, after being ranked 63rd in 2010 out of 322 schools listed. The magazine ranked the school 46th in 2008 out of 316 schools. Schooldigger.com ranked the school tied for 122nd out of 381 public high schools statewide in its 2011 rankings (a decrease of 16 positions from the 2010 ranking) which were based on the combined percentage of students classified as proficient or above proficient on the mathematics (85.9%) and language arts literacy (94.6%) components of the High School Proficiency Assessment (HSPA).

== Sports ==
The Wayne Valley High School Indians compete in the Big North Conference, which is comprised of public and private high schools in Bergen and Passaic counties, which was created following a reorganization of sports leagues in Northern New Jersey by the New Jersey State Interscholastic Athletic Association. In the 2009-10 school year, the school competed in the North Jersey Tri-County Conference, which was established on an interim basis to facilitate the realignment. Prior to the realignment, the school had participated in the Northern Hills Conference's Skyline Division. With 994 students in grades 10-12, the school was classified by the NJSIAA for the 2019–20 school year as Group III for most athletic competition purposes, which included schools with an enrollment of 761 to 1,058 students in that grade range. The football team competes in the Freedom Red division of the North Jersey Super Football Conference, which includes 112 schools competing in 20 divisions, making it the nation's biggest football-only high school sports league. The school was classified by the NJSIAA as Group IV North for football for 2024–2026, which included schools with 893 to 1,315 students.

The school participates in a joint ice hockey team with Wayne Hills High School as the host school / lead agency. The co-op program operates under agreements scheduled to expire at the end of the 2023–24 school year.

The football team was awarded the sectional championship by the New Jersey State Interscholastic Athletic Association in 1967, 1968 and 1970. Since the playoff system was introduced in 1974, the team has won the NJSIAA North I Group III state sectional championships in 1984, 1988, 1989 and 1991, and won the North II Group IV title in 2019. The 1984 team won the North I Group III title against Northern Highlands Regional High School by a score of 28-6 in the championship game to finish the season 11-0. The 1988 team finished the season with 10-0-1 record after winning the North I Group III title with a 49-10 win against Ramapo High School. The 1989 team won the North I Group III title by defeating Pascack Valley High School with a 19-14 win in the tournament final. The 1991 team finished the season with a 11-0 record after defeating Wayne Valley by a score of 7-0 in front of a crowd of 10,000 to win the North I Group III state sectional championship. The program won its fifth playoff championship in 2019 with a 21-17 win in the North II Group IV title game against Northern Valley Regional High School at Old Tappan. Wayne Hills and Wayne Valley have participated in an annual rivalry since 2009, which Wayne Hills leads 11-2 through the 2017 season. NJ.com listed the rivalry in the 24th spot on their 2017 list "Ranking the 31 fiercest rivalries in N.J. HS football".

The field hockey team won the North I Group IV state sectional championship in 1975 and 1979.

The varsity baseball team won the Passaic County Tournament championships in 1981, 1986, 1988, 2010, 2015 and 2019 A single in the bottom of the seventh of the 2016 PCT championship game gave the team the title with a 4-3 win against Pompton Lakes High School. The team won the PCT title in 2019, defeating Passaic Valley Regional High School by a 2-1 score in the finals.

The 2008 boys' basketball team, seeded 10th in the tournament, won the North I Group III state championship over top seed West Milford High School by a score of 48-45 in a game played at John F. Kennedy High School in Paterson, New Jersey. This was the team's first sectional title in just over a decade.

The Wayne Valley boys' track team went undefeated in the 2011 season, winning the county relays, conference and county meets. The girls' team went undefeated in the dual meet season, losing the conference meet to West Orange High School which came down to the last event, and won its fifth county title in a row.

The girls' fencing team was the sabre team champion in 2012.

The boys' wrestling team won the North I Group III state sectional title in 2014, 2024 and 2025 and the North I Group IV title in 2019.

In 2023, 2024, and 2025, the Wayne Valley High School marching band won the Group A title at the New Jersey Marching Band Directors' Association State Championships held at The College of New Jersey, with respective scores of 82.6, 87.5, and 89.35.

== Incidents ==
On June 13, 2007, authorities found two bundles of what looked like half-sticks of dynamite in two lockers at Wayne Valley. All of the students were evacuated, and the Passaic County Sheriff's Department bomb squad extracted the devices. The devices were then detonated at the Paterson firing range. It is unknown whether the devices were intended to do harm or be used as part of a prank. On June 27, 2007, five members of the class that just graduated from the school were arrested for their roles in the incident.

== Administration ==
The school's principal is Jennifer Grimbilas. Her core administration team includes four assistant principals.

Grimbilas was named principal of the high school in September 2025, becoming the first woman to hold the position. Grimbilas has spent her entire career within the Wayne school district and had previously served in a variety of leadership roles before being selected as principal.

== Notable alumni ==
- Jay Della Valle (born 1979), filmmaker, singer and songwriter
- Lisa Edelstein (born 1966, class of 1984), actress who starred as Dr. Lisa Cuddy, on the Fox drama series House and the Bravo drama series Girlfriends' Guide to Divorce
- Jazmine Fenlator-Victorian (born 1985, class of 2003), Olympian who competed for Team USA in the bobsled during the 2014 Winter Games
- John A. Ferraro (1946-2010), actor, academic, stage director and television director
- Alice Gainer (born 1982, class of 2000), journalist.
- Paulie Harraka (born 1989), stock car racing driver and entrepreneur
- Jack A. James Jr. (born 1968, class of 1987), United States Army major general
- Gene Mayer (born 1956, class of 1973), former professional tennis player who won 14 singles titles during his career and went unbeaten in his two years on the tennis team at Wayne Valley
- Pete Muller, hedge fund manager and quantitative trader who founded PDT Partners in 1993 as part of Morgan Stanley's trading division
- Chris Pantale (born 1990, class of 2008), tight end with the New York Jets
- Ed Rothstein (born 1963), politician and former United States Army colonel who has served as the secretary of the Maryland Department of Veterans and Military Families
- Francesca Russo (born 1995), fencer who represented Team USA at the 2020 Tokyo Summer Olympics, competing as part of the Women's Sabre team
- Justin Shackil (born 1987, class of 2005), sportscaster for the New York Yankees
- Art Thoms (born 1947, class of 1965), former NFL defensive tackle
- Michael Turco (born 1982, class of 2000), magician
- Ryan Van Demark (born 1998, class of 2016), American football offensive tackle for the Buffalo Bills
- Zach Sang (born 1993, class of 2012), American radio personality, podcaster, and media producer, best known for his work as the host of The Zach Sang Show
