= Everybody Dies (album) =

Studio album by Dramarama
- Released: October 25, 2005
- Studio: Village Recorders / Network
- Genre: Alternative
- Length: 42:34
- Label: 33rd Street
- Producer: John Easdale

Dramarama chronology
Hi-Fi Sci-Fi (1993)	Everybody Dies (2005)	Color TV (2020)

Everybody Dies is the sixth official studio album by Dramarama. It was released on October 25, 2005 (see 2005 in music). It also marks their first album of new material in 12 years since Hi-Fi Sci-Fi. The group was disbanded during that time.

== Critical reception ==
Professional ratings
Review scores
Source	Rating
AllMusic	4/5 stars
Robert Christgau	(2-star Honorable Mention)

Seattle Weekly wrote: "Dramarama speak punky mainstream rock as a language rather than deferring to it as a rule book; Easdale sings the over-40 blues without succumbing to coulda-been bitterness."

== Track listing ==
All songs written by John Easdale, except for where noted.

1. "The Bottle and the Bell" – 2:58
2. "Everybody Dies" – 3:12
3. "Good Night, America" – 3:43
4. "When Did You Leave Heaven?" (Walter Bullock & Richard A. Whiting) – 1:23
5. "Physical Poetry (A-B-C-D-1-2-3)" – 3:20
6. "I Will Try" – 0:55
7. "Try 5 Times" – 2:12
8. "Dropping the Curtains" – 5:03
9. "The Company" (John Easdale/Mark Englert) – 2:49
10. "Gotta Get Up" – 4:26
11. "King for a Day" – 3:26
