= LA Invasion =

Rock festival in California

KROQ LA Invasion
- Genre: Rock music
- Dates: Mid-August or mid-September
- Location: Southern California
- Years active: 2001 - 2007
- Founders: KROQ
- Website: kroq.com

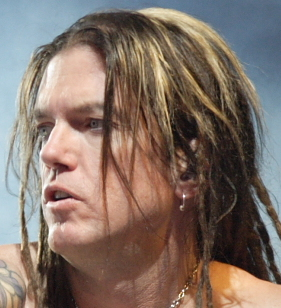
Artist Dizzy Reed during the LA Invasion

KROQ LA Invasion was an annual autumn rock festival organized by KROQ radio.

It began under the name "KROQ Inland Invasion" with a retro theme focus and was held at the Hyundai Pavilion in Devore, California, from 2001 to 2006. In 2007, it was renamed "KROQ LA Invasion" and moved to the Home Depot Center in Carson, California. The last festival was in 2007.

== Line-ups ==
Bands listed in reverse order of night's performance.

Date	Line-up
August 25, 2001	Main Stage: The Offspring, Mike D. & Mix Master Mike, Incubus, Social Distortion, Pennywise, Weezer, Long Beach Dub Allstars. Side Stage 1: Puddle of Mudd, Cold, Adema, Drowning Pool (cancelled), Scapegoat Wax. Side Stage 2: Bombay Black, Shoppy, Funktion.
September 14, 2002	Main Stage: Sex Pistols, The Offspring, Social Distortion, Bad Religion, blink-182, Pennywise, Buzzcocks, New Found Glory, X, The Damned, Unwritten Law Side Stage: The Vandals, Charged GBH, Circle Jerks, T.S.O.L., The Adolescents, The Distillers
September 20, 2003	Main Stage: The Cure, Duran Duran, Hot Hot Heat, Echo & the Bunnymen, Violent Femmes, The Psychedelic Furs, Interpol, Marc Almond (of Soft Cell), Fountains of Wayne, Bow Wow Wow, Dashboard Confessional, General Public. Side Stage: Berlin, Kings of Leon, Dramarama, Jet.
September 18, 2004	Main Stage: Morrissey (cancelled, but did make-up show on Halloween), Siouxsie, Billy Idol, Franz Ferdinand, Devo, Tears for Fears, The Killers, Ian Brown of The Stone Roses, X, Muse. Side Stage: A Flock of Seagulls, Death Cab for Cutie, Missing Persons, The Walkmen.
September 17, 2005	Main Stage: Cake, Oasis, Weezer, Beck, 311, Madness, Jet, Garbage, Live, Arcade Fire, The Bravery, DJ Am & Travis Barker. Side Stage: Bloc Party, Fishbone, Kasabian.
September 23, 2006	Main Stage: Guns N' Roses, Alice in Chains, Muse, Avenged Sevenfold, Papa Roach, Thirty Seconds to Mars, Rise Against, Buckcherry, Atreyu, Poets & Pornstars.
September 15, 2007	Main Stage: The Smashing Pumpkins, Foo Fighters, Velvet Revolver, Kid Rock, Chris Cornell, Cypress Hill, Satellite Party, Hot Hot Heat, Against Me!, Paramore. KROQ Locals Only Side Stage: Onesidezero, New Years Day, Orange, The Pricks.
