= Anything Anything with Rich Russo =

US radio program

- Genre: Music show
- Running time: 2 hours per episode, weekly
- Country of origin: United States
- Home station: 107.1 The Peak
- Created by: Rich Russo
- Original release: November 9, 2008; 18 years ago

Anything Anything with Rich Russo is a weekly two-hour freeform radio program that airs on Sunday nights at 9 pm in the New York City market. The program's weekly playlists range from deep tracks of known artists, punk, non-album b-sides, bubblegum pop, TV themes, jazz, blues, country, novelty and unsigned local artists. Dramarama's "Anything, Anything (I'll Give You)" is the theme song and the Live at the China Club version begins 99% of the shows (occasionally an acoustic or piano version is played). The show has world premiered tracks by Bruce Springsteen, Green Day, and Tegan and Sara. fun.'s "We Are Young" had its first airing in October 2011 on Anything Anything with Rich Russo. The show has also had numerous guests including Andrew WK, Joan Jett, Mike Ness, Brandon Flowers, Jim James of My Morning Jacket, The Buried Life, Darryl "DMC" McDaniels, Girl in a Coma, Little Steven Van Zandt, Alejandro Escovedo, Steel Train, The Bangles, Urge Overkill, The Smithereens, Jesse Malin, Paul Collins, Garland Jeffreys, Lucero and Prima Donna.

== Broadcast history ==
The show began on November 9, 2008, on WRXP. Upon their sale and format switch in July 2011, the show moved to WXPK-FM on September 25, 2011.

Russo also hosts and curates The Jersey Guy Does Jersey on Sirius/XM's Little Steven's Underground Garage and also the Midnight Malfeasance on the same channel.

== Influences ==
Host Rich Russo cites as his influences the following radio personalities and shows:

- Rodney Bingenheimer (Rodney on the ROQ)
- Dr. Demento (The Dr. Demento Show), who has appeared on the show 4 times as Super Bowl counterprogramming
- John Peel (Peel Sessions)
- Vin Scelsa (Idiot's Delight)
- Nic Harcourt
- Little Steven Van Zandt (Little Steven's Underground Garage)
- WFMU

== Notable on-air events ==
August 30, 2009 Brandon Flowers of The Killers calls in and gives the show an exclusive live version of "A Dustland Fairytale" to play on the air.

February 28, 2010 Andrew WK was a guest in studio for the first ever extended broadcast of the show.

May 15, 2011, Darryl DMC McDaniels was a guest on the show. Rich read Sara Quin's entire letter about Tyler the Creator and there was spirited dialogue that followed.

October 9, 2011, As a tribute to the passing of Steve Jobs, Rich played only songs that began with the word "I"

October 21, 2012, For John Wesley Harding's birthday Rich played an hour of his music

July 28, 2013, As a tribute to Hoboken Music Venue Maxwell's closing, Rich only played songs that were recorded live at the club on his WDHA show

Every Super Bowl Sunday since 2011, Dr. Demento serves as the co-host for a special all novelty edition show.

== Notable off-air events ==
As an extension of the radio show, Russo began doing events with local unsigned bands on Staten Island, which then led to events in Brooklyn and New Jersey and then New York City.

An Anything Anything show at Santos Party House drew over 700 people for a group of unsigned bands and featured a guest appearance by Andrew WK for the encore.

Russo also hosted a series of residency shows with Jesse Malin at Bowery Electric. Every show in the concert series sold out and featured guests including Billie Joe Armstrong from Green Day, Moby, and Eugene Hutz from Gogol Bordello

Anything Anything was given the exclusive on both Foxboro Hot Tubs (Green Day) shows to announce, promote and give away tickets.

A special secret show was held to celebrate Alejandro Escovedo's appearance on Letterman; it sold out immediately and was featured in a write up in Rolling Stone by David Fricke.

November 2010, the Anything Anything 2nd Anniversary Show was featured in the gossip pages of the Daily News (due to Lady Gaga, Madonna and Joan Jett being in attendance).

For Record store day 2010, a special limited edition of 500 copies of live performances from the Anything Anything radio show featuring all unsigned local acts, sold 468 copies in one day and was the 68th best selling album of the week in the NY Market. There was an Anything Anything bus tour visiting local record stores that day and received local TV coverage. 100% of the profits of the record went directly to the record stores.

Russo serves as emcee with Vincent Pastore of the annual Light of Day concerts in Asbury Park, NJ where he has brought Bruce Springsteen on stage on two different occasions.

Russo also served as emcee with Vincent Pastore and Maureen Van Zandt at Little Kids Rock Benefit at Hammerstein Ballroom on October 20, 2014, performers included Joan Jett, Alice Cooper, Cheap Trick, Billie Joe Armstrong, Mike Ness, Darlene Love, Jake Clemons, Tommy James and Brody Dalle,

The Anything Anything 4th Anniversary Party with Social Distortion at Starland Ballroom was cancelled due to Hurricane Sandy.

The Anything Anything 5th Anniversary Party with Tegan and Sara, Willie Nile and Plastiq Passion was on September 27, 2013, at Starland Ballroom.

The Anything Anything 6th Anniversary Party Part 1 with Social Distortion, The Whigs and Jonny Two Bags was September 4, 2014, at Starland Ballroom.

The Anything Anything 6th Anniversary Party Part 2 With Joan Jett and the Blackhearts and Jesse Malin was October 11, 2014, at the Count Basie Theatre.

The Anything Anything 8th Anniversary Party Part 1 with Lucero, Cory Branan and was October 21, 2016, at the House of Independents, Asbury Park

The Anything Anything 8th Anniversary Party Part 2 with David Cassidy, The Battery Electric and Hell Yeah Babies was October 27, 2016, at the Count Basie Theatre

== Reception and reviews ==
Rich was voted the best DJ in the October 19–25, 2011 Village Voice Best of NYC Issue

"Anything Anything has the kind of creative freedom that is unrivaled on mainstream radio -- no mandated playlist, ever. Rich has complete control over the music he plays and the result is a free form show that recalls radio's glory days of the 70's - raw, gutsy, opinionated, fun. Anything, Anything was also a huge ratings success in an era when terrestrial radio seems to be on its last legs. When the show started three years ago, Russo was a completely unknown underdog, up against established shows on huge radio stations in the biggest radio market in the world -- New York City. Through guerrilla marketing he built the brand into a roaring success, becoming a Sunday night ratings juggernaut by the time the station folded." – Holly Cara Price, The Huffington Post

"The third floor of Russo's home is the scientist's lab, the place where he transfers songs from vinyl to CD, then to iPod, and ultimately, onto the set list for his shows. He makes lists, listens to them as he travels around, adding and deleting to best manage the mood. Among the white boxes of tunes, the built-in shelves that contain more music, Russo sits at a simple office chair, swiveling to propel him into the area where he knows particular songs can be found. Resting in a cradle is one of Springsteen's guitars, with the inscription, "To Rich, Thanks," and the Boss's signature. In the corner by the turntables, a cutout of Elvis — Costello, this time — watches eagerly with a "put me in, coach" look — as Russo builds his set." – David Chmiel, The Cranford Patch

"Tegan and Sara headlined a bill that accurately reflected Russo's eclectic tastes: a pinch of imaginative homegrown talent, a solid block of meat-and-potatoes, Springsteen-style guitar rock, and pure new-wave ear candy." - Tris McCall, The Star Ledger
