= Breakfast with the Beatles =

- Country of origin: United States
- Language: English
- Created by: Helen Leicht
- Original release: 1976
- Website: breakfastwiththebeatles.com

Breakfast with the Beatles is a popular programming segment format on FM radio in cities in the United States. The segment format typically features one or more hours of programing consisting exclusively of music by or related to the Beatles. Several nationally syndicated variations exist as well as many locally produced versions. Once a month, a live version of the Los Angeles broadcast with Chris Carter, though still recorded for radio, is hosted during an actual brunch at the Kobe Steakhouse & Lounge in Seal Beach, California. It is also being broadcast live the last Sunday of the each month, from Morongo Casino, Resort & Spa in Cabazon, California.

Program contents include Beatles recordings; solo recordings by former members of the Beatles; cover versions of songs written or performed by the Beatles or the former members thereof; music by close associates of the Beatles, such as Yoko Ono, and the children of members of the band; music by artists that influenced the Beatles; music by musicians who personally knew or played with members of the group; news, features, and interviews related to the Beatles, former members and associates; family members; and interviews with experts on Beatle history and trivia.

== History ==
Disc Jockey Helen Leicht created, hosted and produced an early version of Breakfast with the Beatles on WIOQ in Philadelphia beginning in 1976 and running through 1989; when WIOQ changed formats, Leicht moved the program to station WMGK. Disc jockeys and program directors at other stations picked up the idea and variations on a Beatles-themed programming block appeared throughout the US. The concept proved a good fit for morning programming (particularly on weekends) and so the Breakfast name, or a variant, was often used. The all-Beatles format was further popularized by such nationally syndicated programs as Ticket to Ride, hosted by Scott Muni in the 1980s.

== Local productions ==
Radio stations which feature, or have featured a Breakfast with the Beatles program include: WXRT in Chicago, WECK in Buffalo, New York, WMGK in Philadelphia, WGRF in Buffalo, WMXJ in Miami/Ft. Lauderdale, KMET in Los Angeles, KLSX in Los Angeles, KCBS-FM in Los Angeles, KLOS in Los Angeles, KSLX-FM in Phoenix, Arizona, WZLX in Boston, WAXQ Q104.3 in New York, WGRX (now known as WZBA) in Baltimore, WQXA in Harrisburg/York Pennsylvania, WYUU and also WMTX in the Tampa Bay Area, WBIK in Cambridge, Ohio, WTUE in Dayton, Ohio, KQMT in Denver, KZOK in Seattle, WTIX in New Orleans, The Walrus FM in Baja California, Mexico (serving San Diego, California), WZOM FM in Defiance, Ohio, hosted by Bob (Krouse) James and WEXT in Albany, NY. The longest-running version of the show is on WICB in Ithaca, which has been airing weekly since 1980.

Paul McCartney, Ringo Starr, Pete Best, Olivia Harrison and Yoko Ono have all been guests on the version of the show in Los Angeles, which was dropped in 2006 by KLSX-FM, but picked up by 95.5 KLOS in November 2006. Ringo Starr, Pete Best and Spencer Davis along with Beach Boys Brian Wilson and Mike Love also frequently called into the Tampa Bay's WYUU U92 92.5 fm 1988 to 1999 show with Dr. Chuck Stevens as the host. Dr. Chuck Stevens was also awarded a RIAA Gold and Platinum album awards from Capitol Records for "The Beatles Anthology" also credited as the first American radio personality to debut the Capitol Records Single "Free As A Bird" (Documented)

The Los Angeles show is currently hosted by longtime Beatles expert Chris Carter, who replaced the late Deirdre O'Donoghue in 2001.

Radio Hall of Fame winner, 50 year veteran Disc Jockey, and Beatles expert Terri Hemmert has been hosting Breakfast with the Beatles on WXRT, Chicago since 2002. The weekly show features original releases, alternate takes, rare recordings, and cover versions of Beatles music, as well as authoritative guest commentaries and interviews. This dedicated segment keeps the music memories alive while introducing the Beatles to new listener generations.

Longtime Boston-area radio personality Cha-Chi Loprete has hosted a local Breakfast with the Beatles since 2005 that is currently heard on WUMB, Maine's 104.3 The Goat, other local stations and online.

== National productions ==
In 2008, Chris Carter took Breakfast with the Beatles to the Underground Garage channel on SiriusXM satellite radio. Carter's Sirius XM version of Breakfast with the Beatles was the only officially EMI/Apple-sanctioned Beatles show on the air. With the launch of The Beatles Channel in 2017, Carter's program moved to that station. However, he still hosts the Los Angeles local version of the show on KLOS, which is not the same version as the one on Sirius XM, on Sunday mornings.

A syndicated version of the program format, Dennis Mitchell's Breakfast with the Beatles, is carried on radio stations throughout North America, Europe, Australia, and New Zealand. Mitchell, a member of the Nevada Broadcasters Hall of Fame, had hosted a local version of the program at KKLZ in Las Vegas for 11 years prior to moving to syndication in early 2002. Mitchell's guests have included Yoko Ono, Ringo Starr, Olivia Harrison, Brian Wilson, Geoff Emerick, Pete Best, George Martin, Freda Kelly, and many others. As of 2013, the show's ad sales were being handled by United Stations Radio Networks. It is distributed by DOR Productions, Inc. of Las Vegas. The show's flagship station is KTYD in Santa Barbara, California.

There are also four other all-Beatles radio formats that air on a commercial basis nationally, although with slightly modified names: The Brunch with Joe Johnson (known as Beatle Brunch for much of its history) is distributed by Westwood One and Radio Express. A different Beatle Brunch is heard Sunday mornings at 10:00am EDT on https://www.xersradio.com. Bob Malik's The Beatle Years is carried by Compass Media Networks. Pat Matthews hosts Beatles-a-Rama, which also operates as a 24/7 Internet stream with full staffing (the 24/7 Beatles-a-Rama channel also carries Mitchell's Breakfast with the Beatles). For public, community and internet radio stations, Ken Michaels hosts Every Little Thing.

The longest-running Beatles themed radio program outside of the United States is BeatlesandBeyond presented by Pete Dicks of England. BeatlesandBeyond airs in the United Kingdom, United States, England, Spain, and the United Arab Emirates. It is not only recognized by Apple Corps., but is the only radio show recommended by Liverpool's award winning Beatles Story Exhibition. The worldwide audience of BeatlesandBeyond is estimated to be in excess of 200,000 weekly from over 50 countries. In Liverpool, where the Beatles were formed, Ian Kennedy hosts The Late Late Beatles Show on BBC Radio Merseyside.
