= 10 from 5 =

Compilation album by Dramarama
- Released: 1993
- Genre: Rock
- Language: English
- Label: Chameleon

Professional ratings
Review scores
Source	Rating
Allmusic	4/5 stars

10 from 5 is a compilation album by alternative rock group Dramarama, released in 1993.

== Track listing ==
1. "Work for Food"
2. "What Are We Gonna Do?"
3. "Last Cigarette"
4. "Haven't Got a Clue"
5. "Shadowless Heart"
6. "Some Crazy Dame"
7. "Would You Like"
8. "Memo from Turner"
9. "It's Still Warm"
10. "Work for Food" [Acoustic Version]
