= Stuck in Wonderamaland =

Studio album by Dramarama
- Released: 1989
- Recorded: 1988
- Genre: Rock
- Length: 38:15
- Label: Chameleon
- Producer: Dramarama, Val Garay

Dramarama chronology
Box Office Bomb (1987)	Stuck in Wonderamaland (1989)	Vinyl (1991)

Singles from Stuck in Wonderamaland
- 1. "Last Cigarette" Released: 1989; 2. "Wonderamaland b/w 70's TV" Released: 1989

Stuck in Wonderamaland is the third album by the American band Dramarama, released in 1989. "I Wish I Was Your Mother" is a cover of the Mott the Hoople song. The band supported the album with a North American tour. "Last Cigarette" was a minor rock radio hit.

== Critical reception ==
Professional ratings
Review scores
Source	Rating
AllMusic	4/5 stars
Robert Christgau	B+
Los Angeles Daily News	4/4 stars

The Globe and Mail called the album "guitar-driven rock (featuring a tastefully balanced acoustic/electric blend) that owes no small debt to the early work of Tom Petty and the Heartbreakers." The Chicago Tribune deemed it "one of the most intense, moving rock albums of the last year," writing that "the twin guitars of Mr. E Boy and Peter Wood and the rhythm section of Chris Carter (bass) and Jesse (drums) play with fire, turning [John] Easdale's existential lyrics into music that is both dreamlike and passionate."

== Track listing ==
All songs written by John Easdale, except where noted.

1. "Wonderamaland" - 4:08
2. "No Regrets" - 3:53
3. "Fireplace, Pool, & Air Conditioning" - 4:20
4. "Lullabye" - 3:18
5. "It's Hardly Enough" - 2:33
6. "Last Cigarette" - 4:55
7. "70's TV" - 3:27
8. "Try" - 3:22
9. "Would You Like" - 3:01
10. "I Wish I Was Your Mother" (Ian Hunter) - 3:32
11. "Pumps on a Hill" - 0:50
12. "Stuck in Wonderamaland" - 1:03
