= Deirdre O'Donoghue =

American disc jockey

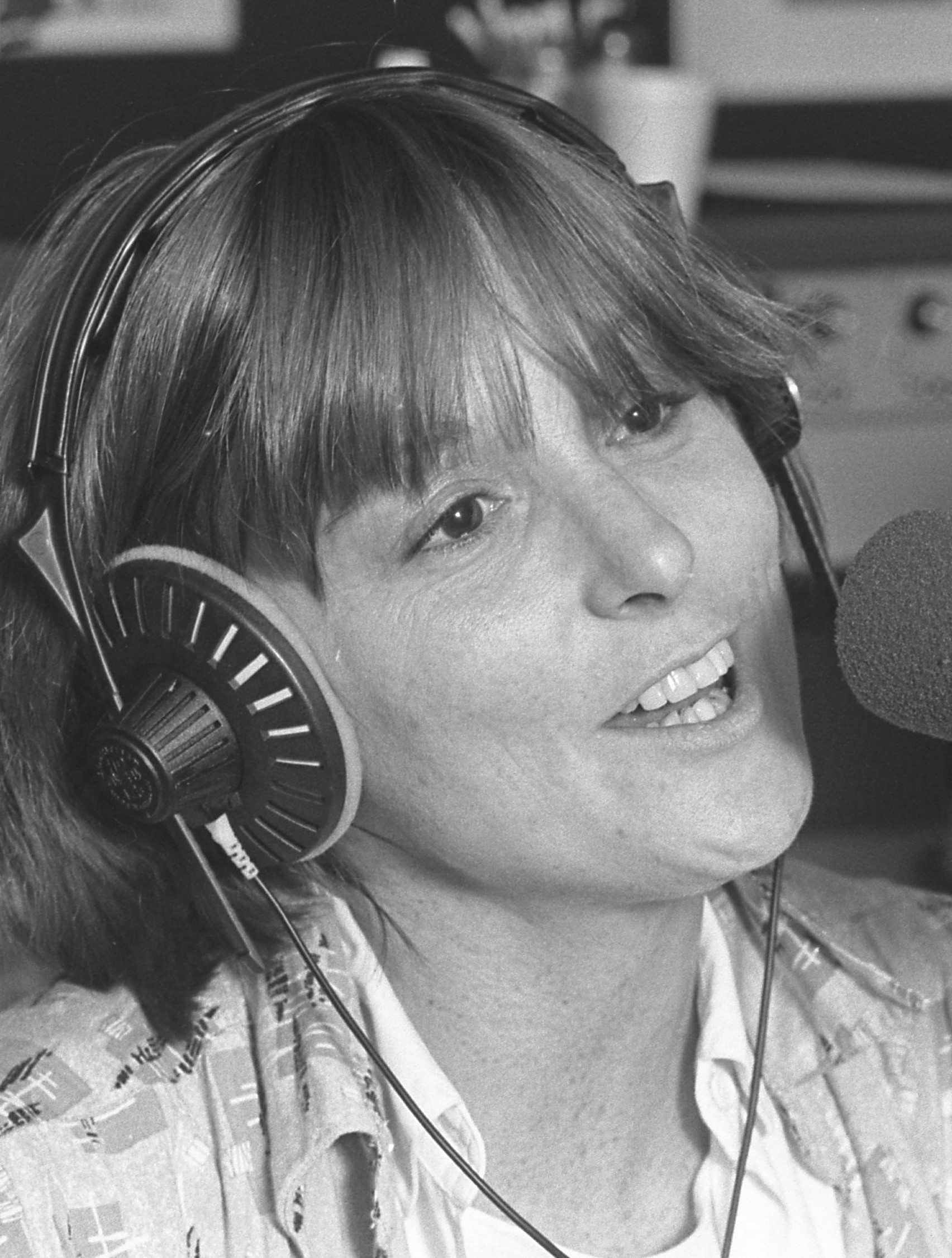
- O'Donoghue in 1985
- Born: July 16, 1948; New York City, New York, U.S.
- Died: January 21, 2001 (aged 52); Santa Monica, California
- Education: Clark University
- Years active: 1973–2001

Deirdre O'Donoghue (July 16, 1948 – January 21, 2001) was a disc jockey known for her shows SNAP! on KCRW-FM and Breakfast with the Beatles on KMET-FM and later KLSX-FM. She has been called the "most influential American DJ you’ve never heard of" due to her show having many underground guests such as The Dream Syndicate and Concrete Blonde, while also welcoming established artists as well.

== Biography ==
O'Donoghue was born in New York City in 1948, the oldest of eight children. She attended a Catholic school, before studying at Clark University in Worcester, Massachusetts, graduating in 1968 with a degree in microbiology.

She started her radio career in 1973, working at WBCN and WNTN in Boston, then moving to WABX in Detroit in 1975 then going to KMGC in Dallas. In 1979, after a brief stay in Pasadena, she moved to Los Angeles, starting at KKGO-FM and meeting Harry Shearer before joining KCRW-FM in 1980, having been hired by Tom Schnabel. There, she started the program SNAP! (an acronym for Saturday Night's A Party, which O'Donoghue gave an alternative name of Saturday Night Avant Pop), and later started the program Breakfast with the Beatles in 1976 at KMET-FM, simultaneously working at both stations to do both shows. SNAP! ran from 1982 to 1991, alongside Breakfast with the Beatles. KCRW aired three nights a week with things that were considered the "cutting edge of contemporary pop music." When KMET changed formats in 1987, O’Donoghue took Breakfast with the Beatles to KNX-FM.

O'Donoghue later worked at 91X in San Diego, continuing Breakfast with the Beatles and a derivative of SNAP!, titled SNAP Judgements on weekends.

Looking to escape the Los Angeles scene, O'Donoghue lived for a while with historian Julian Cope in Yatesbury, England.

=== Firings ===
In 1986, she was briefly fired by the bosses at KCRW due in part to her refusal to share her playlists with the music department. On November 2, 1986, KCRW's Ruth Seymour fired O'Donoghue for not sticking to the music and talking about other things such as the Nicaraguan Revolution, which led to O'Donoghue's friend and colleague DJ Brent Wilcox resigning on air in protest. She returned on March 2, 1987, and remained with KCRW until 1991, when she left for health reasons. She claimed something in the station's under-construction basement studios was making her sick. She asked to work from home while the work continued; after being denied, she quit.

=== Death and legacy ===
Having returned to her Santa Monica apartment after living in England, O'Donoghue's health continued to worsen. She died on January 21, 2001, at her home, leaving behind an archive of KCRW interviews and performances from the 1980s on her show. Foul play was not suspected by the coroner's office. Many people expressed sadness because of her death, including musicians Henry Rollins and Michael Stipe, as well as people like Tom Schnabel.

In 2021, Tricia Halloran and Bob Carlson, both of whom were friends of O'Donoghue, announced a 10-part podcast series called Bent By Nature that used her unheard tapes, recorded by O'Donoghue herself.
