= The Whirling Dervishes (band) =

American alternative rock band

Whirling Dervishes
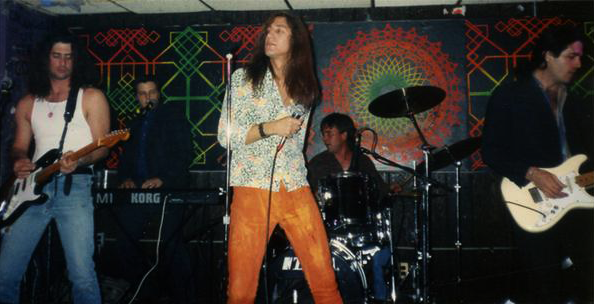
- Whirling Dervishes, New Brunswick, NJ, 1994 — with Dan Paola, Billy Siegel, Don Dazzo, John Bryan, Bob Ardrey and Jerry Heer

Background information
- Origin: Westfield, New Jersey, U.S.
- Genre: Alternative rock
- Years active: 1981–present
- Labels: WM Recordings; Foundation Records; Continuum Records; Rondor Music
- Members: Bob Ardrey (guitar, vocals); Don Dazzo (lead vocals); Dan Paola (guitar, vocals); Billy Siegel (keyboards, vocals); Jerry Heer (bass); John Bryan (drums, percussion)

The Whirling Dervishes are an American alternative rock band from Westfield, New Jersey. Formed in 1981 as Johnny Bravo and his Whirling Dervishes, the band shortened its name in 1983 to Whirling Dervishes. Their sound has been described as a combination of Roxy Music, The Stooges, Nine Inch Nails and The Wonderstuff.

== Career ==
Dazzo, Ardrey, Paola and Siegel met while attending Westfield High School while Heer and Bryan studied at neighboring Union Catholic High School. All performed in various bands during those formative years, except for Dazzo who served as roadie for Ardrey's group, the Shattered Five.

The band is known for its dark pop songs and benefitted greatly from airplay on WHTG-FM in Eatontown, New Jersey, which helped popularize the group at the Jersey Shore and beyond. The band toured the East Coast during the mid-1980s through the early 1990s, but performed most frequently at rock clubs in the New York and New Jersey area such as Stone Pony, Brighton Bar, The Limelight, Danceteria, CBGB, China Club, Kat Club, Fastlane, Court Tavern, the Melody, the Roxy, and the Green Parrot.

The original line-up, Bob Ardrey (guitar, vocals), Don Dazzo (lead vocals), Dan Paola (guitar, vocals), Billy Siegel (keyboards, vocals, producer), Jerry Heer (bass) and John Bryan (drums, percussion), remained together until Ardrey's death in 2024. They have also worked with engineer Alan Douches, known for his engineering and mastering skills with Aerosmith, Steve Taylor and George Benson.

=== Record releases ===
Best known for their perennial Christmas classic cover of "You're A Mean One, Mr. Grinch," the band released two vinyl EPs, History Kicks You (1983) and Affordable World (1985); one CD EP, Wish it Would Snow (1992), independently, re-released in 1994 on Ignition with bonus tracks and again in 1995 as Grinch on Continuum/Universal; and one full-length CD album, Strange and Wonderful (1992).

=== Television and film ===
Signed in 1991 to Herb Alpert's publishing arm of A&M records Rondor Music, the band wrote and recorded the theme song to NBC's television series The Adventures of Mark and Brian.

In 1990, the band released the film Thin Mints, written and directed by Dazzo, starring Ardrey and Fred Harlow, with a score by Siegel and Ardrey, and with Whirling Dervishes' songs prominently featured.

=== Everlounge ===
In 1994, Dazzo and Siegel formed the group Everlounge, later joined by Ardrey, inspired by the New York- and Los Angeles-based lounge music scene. Occasionally, Whirling Dervishes still play local shows in the New Jersey area.
