= The Best of Dramarama: 18 Big Ones =

Compilation album by Dramarama
- Released: 1996
- Recorded: 1984–1993
- Genre: Rock
- Length: 78:24
- Language: English
- Label: Rhino

Professional ratings
Review scores
Source	Rating
AllMusic	4.5/5 stars
Robert Christgau	A−

The Best of Dramarama: 18 Big Ones is a compilation album by alternative rock group Dramarama, released in 1996.

== Track listing ==
1. "Anything, Anything (I'll Give You)" – 3:24
2. "Scenario" – 4:16
3. "Emerald City" – 3:03
4. "Steve & Edie" – 5:05
5. "It's Still Warm" – 3:54
6. "Wonderamaland" – 4:08
7. "No Regrets" – 3:53
8. "Last Cigarette" – 4:56
9. "Haven't Got a Clue" – 4:02
10. "What Are We Gonna Do?" – 3:59
11. "Train Going Backwards" – 6:17
12. "Classic Rot" – 4:26
13. "Work for Food" – 4:09
14. "Incredible" – 4:17
15. "Senseless Fun" – 4:35
16. "7 Minutes (More or Less)" – 4:10
17. "Sincerely" – 2:51
18. "Goin' Blind" – 6:59

"Goin' Blind" is a cover of the Kiss song from Hotter Than Hell.

The extra track after "Goin' Blind" is an acoustic version of "Work for Food."
