= Mayor of the Sunset Strip =

- Directed by: George Hickenlooper
- Written by: George Hickenlooper
- Produced by: Greg Little
- Starring: Rodney Bingenheimer
- Edited by: Julie Janata
- Music by: Anthony Marinelli
- Production company: Lakeshore Entertainment
- Distributed by: First Look Studios
- Release dates: June 17, 2003 (Los Angeles Film Festival); March 26, 2004 (United States)
- Running time: 94 minutes
- Country: United States
- Language: English

Mayor of the Sunset Strip is a 2003 documentary film on the life of Rodney Bingenheimer directed by George Hickenlooper, and produced by Chris Carter.

== Background ==
In 2011, Craig Hlavaty of the Houston Press named Mayor of the Sunset Strip at number eight on the paper's list of "The 31 Best Music Documentaries of All Time". The film won the Best Documentary Feature at the 2004 Santa Barbara International Film Festival.
