= Steadlür =

Studio album by Steadlür
- Released: May 19, 2009
- Genre: Hard rock
- Label: Roadrunner

Professional ratings
Review scores
Source	Rating
Metal.de	7/10
Metal Hammer Germany	Mixed
Metalitalia.com	6.5/10
Rock Hard	7/10

Steadlür is the first and only studio album by the band of the same name.

== Track listing ==
1. "Poison"
2. "Bumpin'"
3. "My Mom Hates Me"
4. "Turn It Up"
5. "It's Too Late"
6. "Whisky And Women"
7. "Angel (On the Wrong Side of Town)"
8. "Time"
9. "Suffocate"
10. "Barely Breathing"
11. "Livin' a Lie"
12. "Change"
13. "Run, Run, Run" (Japanese Bonus Track)

== Personnel ==
- Philip Steadlür - lead vocals, guitar
- Tommy Steadlür - lead guitar
- Daniel Steadlür - bass guitar, vocals
- Dallas Steadlür - drums, backing vocals

== Chart performance ==
Chart (2009)	Peak position
JPN Japanese Albums Chart	146
