= The Thompson Brothers Band =

- Origin: Norwell, Massachusetts, United States
- Genres: Country
- Years active: 1996–2000
- Labels: RCA Nashville
- Past members: Andy Thompson; Matt Thompson; Mike Whitty

The Thompson Brothers Band was an American country music group formed in 1996. The band consisted of brothers Andy Thompson (lead vocals) and Matt Thompson (drums) along with Mike Whitty (bass guitar). They recorded for RCA Nashville in the 1990s, releasing one album, an extended play, and three singles.

== History ==
The Thompson Brothers were raised in Norwell, Massachusetts. Andy Thompson told Country Standard Time that he gained an interest in country music after moving to an area of Massachusetts that had a country station. He, along with his brother Matt and bassist Mike Whitty, then formed a band which played at venues throughout New England. Many of the venues that they played had also hosted Jo Dee Messina. After moving to Nashville, Tennessee, the band attended Belmont University. They attended a listening party held by RCA Nashville for Jon Randall, where a friend put a demo tape of theirs in to test a public address system. After an RCA representative heard the tape, he helped them sign with the label. RCA released a six-song extended play titled Cows on Mainstreet in 1996. The album featured four studio tracks and two live recordings.

Blame It on the Dog, the band's first full album, followed in 1998. RCA promoted the album to radio stations by shipping out a "cool disc" containing four songs from it. Blame It on the Dog produced the singles "Drive Me Crazy" and "Back on the Farm". The band produced the album with Bill Lloyd of Foster & Lloyd. It received a mostly-positive review from Billboard, which praised the "bright, crisp production" and vocal harmonies.

== Discography ==
=== Albums ===
Title	Album details
Cows on Mainstreet	Release date: March 12, 1996; Label: RCA Nashville
Blame It on the Dog	Release date: January 27, 1998; Label: RCA Records
The Late Late Late Show	Release date: June 27, 2000; Label: self-released

=== Singles ===
Year	Single	Peak chart positions		Album
Year	Single	US Country	CAN Country	Album
1997	"Drive Me Crazy"	56	—	Blame It on the Dog
1998	"Back on the Farm"	58	39	Blame It on the Dog
1999	"Hit Me Hard"	—	—	The Late Late Late Show
"—" denotes releases that did not chart

=== Music videos ===
Year	Video	Director
1998	"Back on the Farm"	David Hogan
