= The Beatles Channel =

Sirius XM satellite radio channel

- Broadcast area: United States, Canada

Programming
- Format: The Beatles music

Ownership
- Owner: Sirius XM Radio

Technical information
- Class: Satellite Radio Station

Links
- Website: SiriusXM: The Beatles Channel

The Beatles Channel is a Sirius XM Radio channel focusing on the music of the Beatles. The channel debuted on May 18, 2017, and broadcasts on Sirius XM Radio channel 18.

The channel is described as follows:

The Beatles were the big bang of pop - they created the musical world we live in today. Now for the first time, the most popular band in history presents their own channel. All things Beatles, 24/8. All of their hits, album tracks, rarities & solo songs, along with the records that influenced them and music inspired by them. Plus, hear specials, interviews and exclusive hosted shows. It's the soundtrack of our world made by John, Paul, George and Ringo. (Note: Styling the channel as "24/8" is a wordplay reference to the Beatles song "Eight Days a Week".)

Among various other programs hosted by Beatles fans and experts, the channel has since 2024 aired We Want to Tell You, co-hosted by Aiden Levy and Elizabeth Bonker, both nonspeakers using text-to-speech technology to discuss the Beatles.

== See also ==
- List of Sirius XM Radio channels
