= Mark Englert =

American musician

Mark Englert is an American musician known as a guitarist for Dramarama since 1982. He has appeared with Dramarama on Late Night with David Letterman and The Tonight Show. He has worked with a number of established musicians including Benmont Tench from Tom Petty and The Heartbreakers, and Clem Burke of Blondie. Mark a.k.a. "Mr. E. Boy", was a founding member of Hatful of Rain, a defunct band established in Portland, Oregon during the mid-1990s, which featured singer/songwriter John Lowery and at one time included Courtney Taylor-Taylor of The Dandy Warhols on drums. The band went on to receive stellar reviews from critics around the globe, but failed commercially due to their short term run of just a few months prior to their break-up. Mark has been known to play guitar for many underground artists and has recently put out a few of his own solo records on his own label Phat Boris Records.

Englert grew up in Wayne, New Jersey and met his Dramarama bandmates at Wayne Hills High School.
