= Chameleon (label) =

American independent record label

Chameleon was a record label formed by producer, music entrepreneur and former Capitol Records A&R executive Stephen Powers, in association with Bob Marin, Managing Director of alternative rock importer Sounds Good, and Richard Foos, co-founder of Rhino Records.

== Formation ==
An experienced indie label chief who previously founded Mountain Railroad Records and later Drive Entertainment, Powers quickly signed a distribution agreement with Capitol/EMI, bought out Marin and Foos, and brought in Hyatt Hotel heir, Daniel Pritzker, as a financial partner.

Pritzker was also a musician and songwriter, whose band Sonia Dada, later scored a #1 pop hit in Australia titled "You Don't Treat Me No Good," on the Chameleon label through Festival Records. Powers staffed Chameleon Music Group with industry veterans like Andy Frances, Bill Meehan, and the company grew quickly with 2-tiered, major-label distribution for its flagship Chameleon label and independent distribution for its many alternative imprints.

In 1991, Chameleon was named Independent Label of the Year by National Association of Independent Distributors (NAIRD), and Powers was named Independent Music Executive of the Year.

Bad Religion guitarist Brett Gurewitz was an employee, and Chameleon distributed his early Epitaph releases, such as L7's self-titled debut and T.S.O.L. Chameleon also distributed Minneapolis-based Twin/Tone Records and released the first albums by The Replacements, Soul Asylum and Hüsker Dü; punk label Posh Boy Records (Black Flag, Agent Orange, Redd Kross, Rodney on the ROQ) and had a subsidiary of their own called Dali Records. Chameleon also acquired and relaunched the legendary Chicago Blues Soul label, Vee-Jay Records.

The label won a Grammy award for Best Contemporary Blues Recording for "I'm In The Mood," a duet by John Lee Hooker and Bonnie Raitt from its 1990 release of Hooker's best-selling album, The Healer, also featuring Carlos Santana, Robert Cray, Canned Heat, Los Lobos, Charlie Musslewhite, and others.

In the first years of the label's existence, Chameleon was distributed by Capitol/EMI in the USA, A&M Records of Canada, Festival Records in Australia, BMG in Europe, and various independent distributors. In the last years of the label's existence, Chameleon was distributed worldwide by Elektra Records.

Overall artists included the following: John Lee Hooker, Kyuss, Dramarama, Lowen & Navarro, New Marines, Mary's Danish, Way Moves, Spooner (w/ Butch Vig, Duke Erikson), Sigmund Snopek III, Ecotour, Lucinda Williams, Ferron, Ethyl Meatplow, Bel Canto, and Black Cat Bone.

== See also ==
- List of record labels
