= John Easdale =

American musician

John Easdale (born September 20, 1961 in Wayne, New Jersey) is the lead singer and songwriter for the American band Dramarama.

Easdale grew up in Wayne, New Jersey, and graduated from Wayne Hills High School.
