= Turco (surname) =

Origin
- Origin: Medieval Latin, from Greek.
- Meaning: related to Turks, Turkey.
- Region of origin: Italy, Neo-Latin Languages

Other names
- Variant forms: Turci, Turchi, Del Turco, Lo Turco

Turco is an Italian surname. Notable people with the surname include:

- Bruno Turco (born 1991), Brazilian defensive midfielder
- Carla Turco, Argentine-born television personality, designer, and community advocate
- Cesare Turco (c.1510 – c.1560), Italian Renaissance painter
- Enzo Turco (1902–1983), Italian film actor
- Giuliomaria Turco (born 1982), Venetian independentist, politician and pharmacist
- Giulia Turco (1848–1912), Baroness from Trento, Italy
- Jean Turco (born 1917), French politician
- Lewis Turco (born 1934), American writer
- Livia Turco (born 1955), Italian politician
- Marco Turco (born 1960), Italian director and screenwriter
- Mario Turco (born 1956), former Australian rules footballer
- Marty Turco (born 1975), Canadian hockey player
- Michael Turco, American magician
- Paige Turco (born 1965), American actress
- Peppino Turco (1846–1907), Italian journalist and songwriter
- Richard P. Turco (born 1943), American atmospheric scientist
- Rosselli del Turco, family from Florence, Italy
- Salvatore Turco, American biochemist
- Tommaso Turco (died 1649), the Master of the Order of Preachers from 1644 to 1649

== See also ==
- Del Turco (surname)
- Turco (disambiguation)
