= Del Turco =

Del Turco (or del Turco) may refer to:

- Del Turco (surname), a list of people with the Italian surname
- Del Turco, one of two families which formed the Rosselli del Turco noble family of Florence, Italy, in 1727

== See also ==
- Palazzo Rosselli del Turco (Sassatelli branch), a historical palace located in Florence, Italy
- Palazzo Borgherini-Rosselli del Turco, a Renaissance-style palace located in central Florence, Italy
