= Turco =

Turco may refer to:

- Turco (surname), an Italian surname
- Turco (family), a medieval noble family from Asti and Verona, Italy
- Turco Municipality, Oruro, Bolivia
- Turcos, a nickname for Algerian tirailleurs
- Turcos, a generic nickname for Arab immigrants in Honduras

== See also ==
- Del Turco (surname)
