= Brunoro II Zampeschi =

Italian condottiero

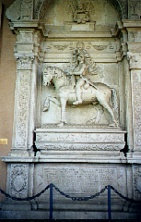
Tomb of Brunoro II Zampeschi

Brunoro II Zampeschi (July 1540 - May 1578) was as an Italian condottiero and lord of Forlimpopoli.

He was born at Forlì, the son of Antonello Zampeschi and Lucrezia Conti. At a young age he married Battistina Savelli, a member of a baronial family of Rome. In 1552, after a series of adventures, he was arrested, and freed only when his mother surrendered the castle of Forlimpopoli to the Papal States. Later Pope Julius III reintegrated him in his possessions.

In 1556 he began his soldier career, fighting for the Pope against the Bagno family and the Spaniards. In 1562 as a cavalry captain for the Republic of Venice. In 1564 he returned to his native Romagna, but four years later Zampeschi moved to the Duchy of Savoy, hired by Duke Emmanuel Philibert I of Savoy, to fight against the Huguenots. Later he fought for Venice against the Ottoman Empire in Croatia, Friuli, Veneto and Dalmatia, and was eventually named general governor of Friuli. After a period under Guidobaldo II della Rovere, Duke of Urbino, he was again hired by Venice, as governor of Candia.

He has published L'innamorato.

In 1557 he returned to Romagna, and died at Forlimpopoli in 1578.
