= Karl Stengel =

Hungarian painter (1925–2017)

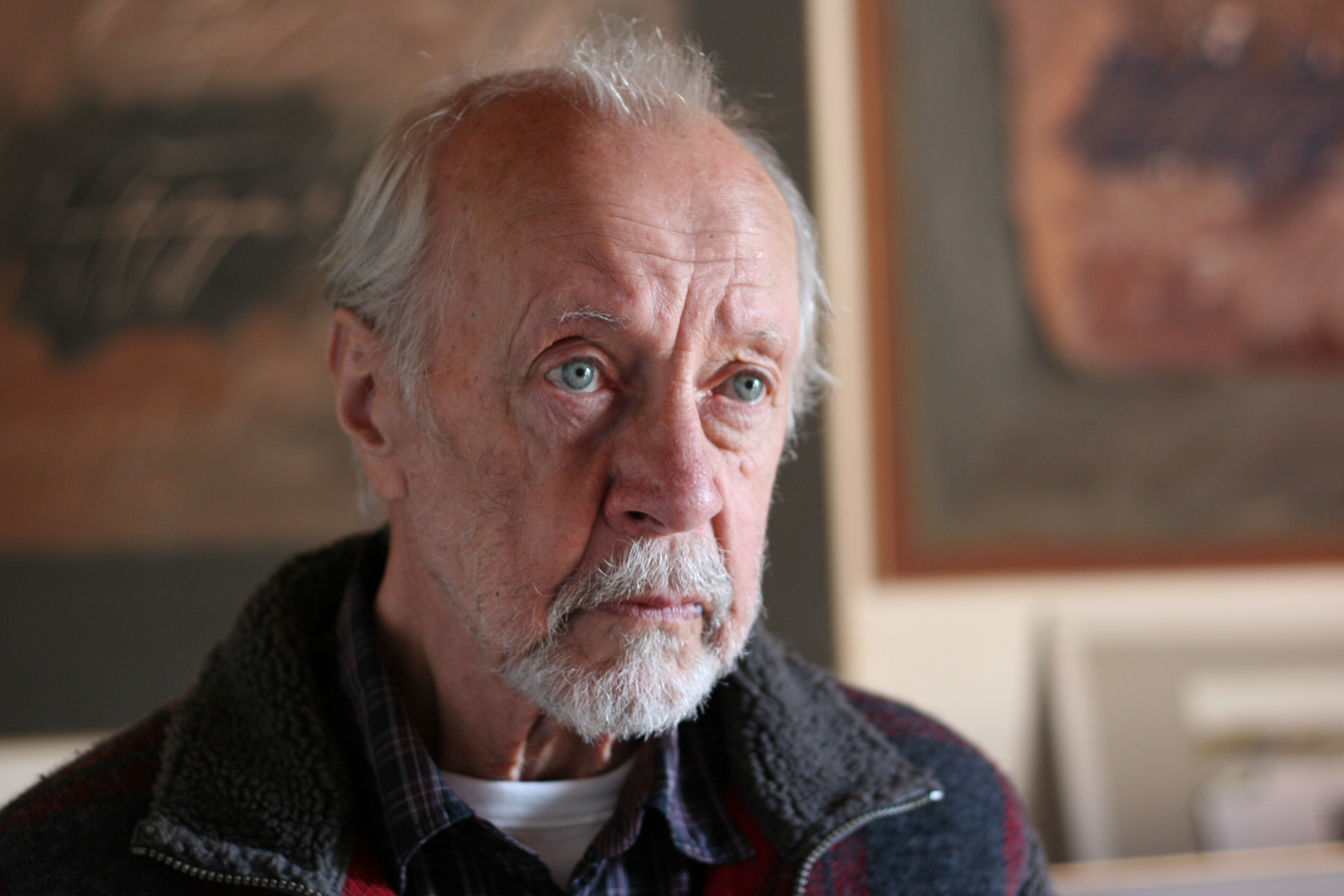
- Karl Stengel photo
- Born: 18 September 1925; Neusatz
- Died: 25 June 2017 (aged 91); Loro Ciuffenna, Italy
- Known for: Painting, drawing

Karl Stengel (Neusatz 1925 – Loro Ciuffenna 2017) was a Hungarian painter who spent most of his adult life in Germany.

== Biography ==
Karl Stengel was born in 1925 in Neusatz, when the Austro-Hungarian Empire was crumbling. He was already passionate about drawing in his childhood and was also very gifted at sports. Stengel was a Russian prisoner of war during the Second World War and after this, he was unable to pursue his love of sport. However, his passion for drawing does accompany him in the Soviet lager and when an officer sees him drawing with a piece of coal on a sack of cement, he is asked to do his portrait and to paint other officers too. This is his "first exhibition". Back in Hungary it is difficult for the son of a bourgeois family to enter the art academy and it is difficult to express one's creativity and individuality when socialist realism imposes itself in every form of expression. In 1956, when Soviet tanks arrived, he fled to Munich, Germany, where he remained for most of his life. It is here in Munich where he attends the Academy of Art and later becomes an art teacher. He dedicated his whole life to painting and drawing and also spent time in Tuscany, where he died on 25 June 2017.

== Style and technique ==
Stengel’s ‘German’ formation and his solid figurative preparation comes to the forefront in his works on paper. While in his larger canvases, generally acrylics on canvas, his art focuses on basic emotions: brightly coloured rectangles that appear to stand out against the canvas hovering above the surface, shimmering and wide-ranging blocks of colour. A principle of figuration emerges and then develops with the typical Stengelian figure, a human silhouette that stands out on an imaginary theatrical backdrop. A man without meaning in front of the world stage. The same silhouette also appears in many oil pastels on paper. The works in the music series are influenced by composers or musicians that Stengel listened to in his studio while he painted. Here the works are clearly abstract, yet one can sometimes still see suggestions of musical scores.

== Exhibitions ==
Solo exhibition at the Civic Museum of Saint Augustine in Genoa, September-November 2018 "Existence is resistance". The Museo Bolivariano de Arte Contemporáneo in Santa Marta, Quinta de San Pedro Alejandrino, Colombia has dedicated a personal exhibition to Karl Stengel – From drawing to metaphor - from November 2018 to February 2019.

== Stengel Collection ==
Palazzo Rosselli del Turco in Florence, Italy, hosts a permanent exhibition of paintings and drawings by Karl Stengel.
