= Andrea Dovizioso =

Italian motorcycle racer (born 1986)

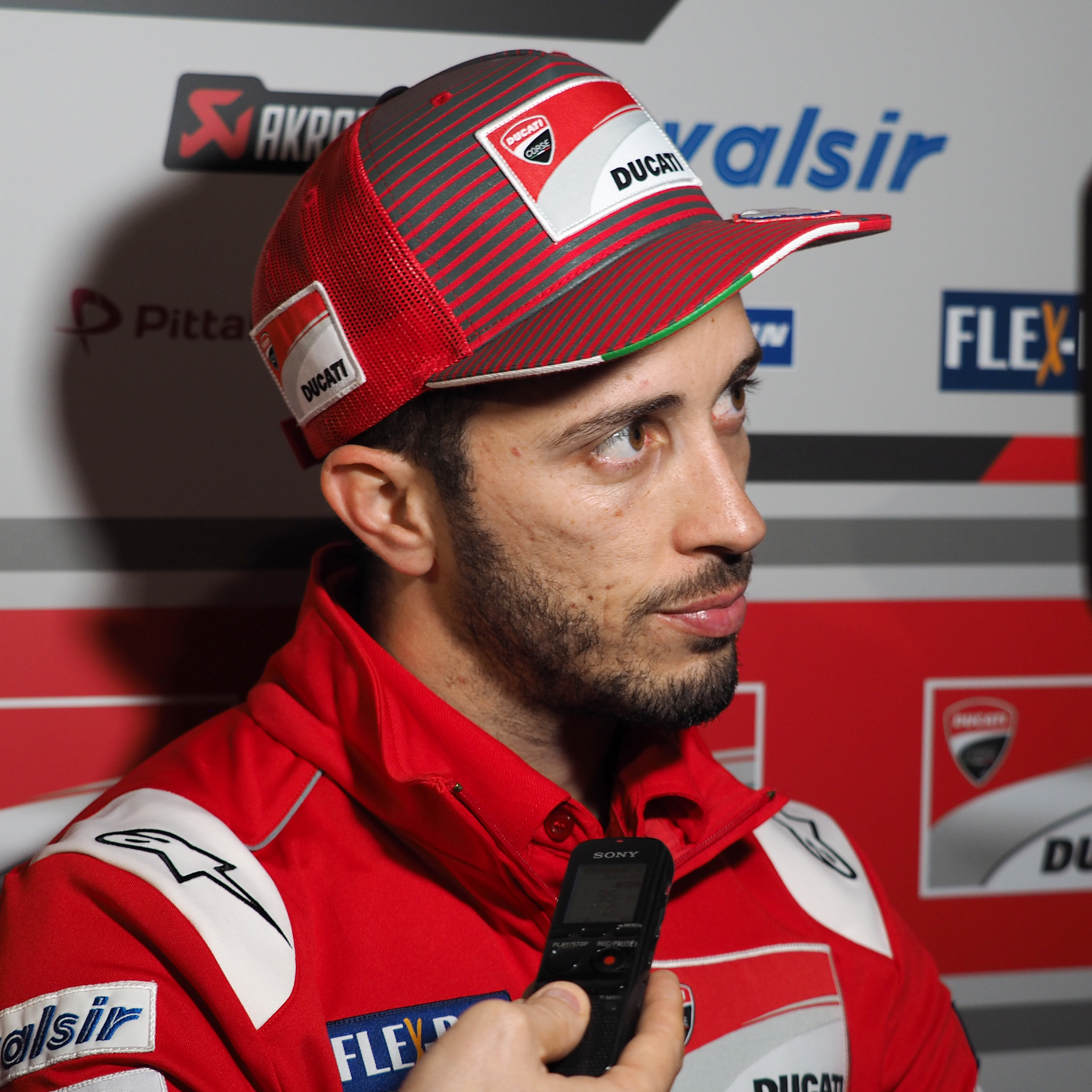
- Dovizioso in 2018
- Nationality: Italian
- Born: 23 March 1986 (age 40); Forlimpopoli, Italy
- Current team: Monster Energy Yamaha (test rider)
- Bike number: 04
- Website: andreadovizioso.com
Motorcycle racing career statistics
MotoGP World Championship
Active years	2008–2022
Manufacturers	Honda (2008–2011); Yamaha (2012, 2021–2022); Ducati (2013–2020)
Championships	0
2022 championship position	21st (15 pts)
Starts / Wins / Podiums / Poles / F. laps / Points; 248 / 15 / 62 / 7 / 11 / 2583
250cc World Championship
Active years	2005–2007
Manufacturers	Honda
Championships	0
2007 championship position	2nd (260 pts)
Starts / Wins / Podiums / Poles / F. laps / Points; 49 / 4 / 26 / 4 / 8 / 721
125cc World Championship
Active years	2001–2004
Manufacturers	Honda, Aprilia
Championships	1 (2004)
2004 championship position	1st (293 pts)
Starts / Wins / Podiums / Poles / F. laps / Points; 49 / 5 / 15 / 9 / 3 / 492

Andrea Dovizioso (born 23 March 1986) is an Italian former professional motorcycle racer. He raced with WithU Yamaha RNF MotoGP Team for the 2022 season but announced his intended-retirement after the Misano round in September. Dovizioso was the 2004 125cc World Champion, but is best known for his time with the Ducati Team in the MotoGP class, finishing championship runner-up to Marc Márquez for three consecutive seasons in 2017, 2018 and 2019.

Dovizioso is one of the most successful modern MotoGP riders with 15 victories and 62 podiums. Dovizioso first came to prominence by winning the 125 cc World Championship in 2004. He then finished third in the 250 cc World Championship in 2005 and was twice a runner-up to Jorge Lorenzo in 2006 and 2007. He made his debut in MotoGP in 2008 and immediately finished fifth in the standings as the top satellite rider earning a move to the Factory Honda team in 2009. In his three seasons with Repsol Honda, he scored 15 podiums, including a maiden MotoGP win at Donington Park, and had a highest championship position of third in 2011. He moved to Monster Yamaha Tech 3 in 2012 and finished in fourth position getting six podiums which earned him a move to Factory Ducati team in 2013. In 2016, Dovizioso recorded his first win in seven years in Malaysia. In 2017, he found the extra pace needed to challenge for the title with six wins throughout the season, but Marc Marquez, who also had six wins, clinched the title in the final round in Valencia. The subsequent 2018 and 2019 seasons proved less successful, even though he won six combined races and finished runner-up yet again to Marquez. Dovizioso left Ducati after the 2020 season due to a breakdown in relations with the team.

Dovizioso finished within the top-five in ten of his first 13 MotoGP seasons and is considered one of the best MotoGP riders to not win the MotoGP World Championship. He is the only rider in history to win a MotoGP race in three different decades – 2000s, 2010s and 2020s. He is nicknamed 'the Professor' due to his calculated riding approach.

== Career ==
=== Early career ===
Born in Forlimpopoli, son of Antonio Dovizioso, a Sicilian motorcycle racer, Dovizioso won the 125cc Italian Aprilia Challenge in 2000. In 2001, Dovizioso won the 125cc European Championship and also competed in his first World Championship race at Mugello, in which he retired. During that year, he worked with Guido Mancini, a former rider and mechanic who, in the past, had worked with Valentino Rossi and Loris Capirossi. A documentary film about Mancini's career, released in 2016 by director Jeffrey Zani, tells the story of that racing season.

=== 125cc World Championship ===
In 2002, Dovizioso competed in the 125cc World Championship with Team Scot Honda, finishing 16th in the final standings. His best results were two ninth places in Le Mans and Donington. He continued with the team in 2003, finishing fifth in the final standings and achieving four podium finishes. The 2004 season saw him pick up five victories and six other podium finishes on his way to winning the championship with 293 points.

=== 250cc World Championship ===
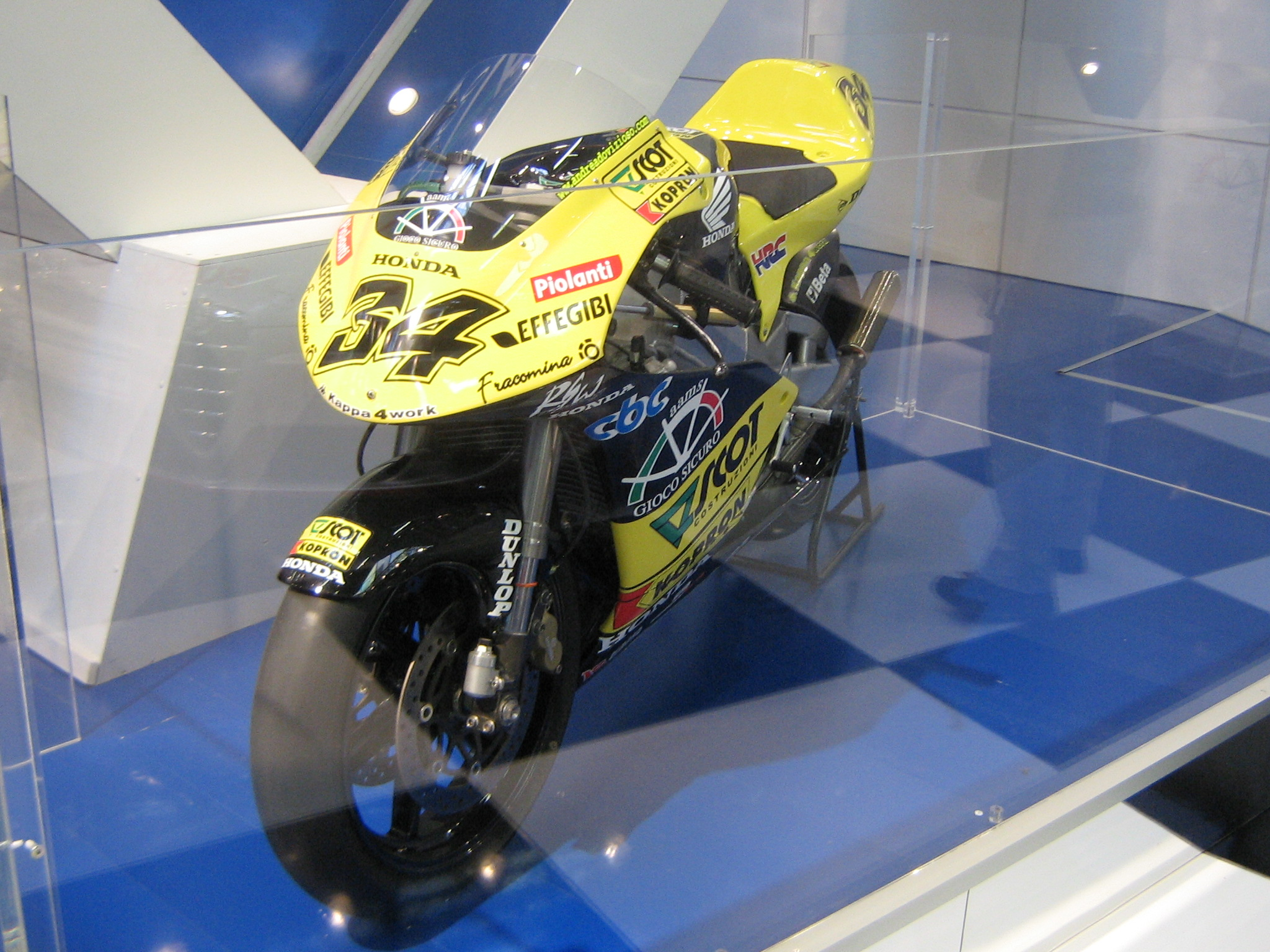
Honda NSR250 used by Dovizioso in the 250cc World Championship

In 2005, Dovizioso moved to the 250cc class, continuing with Team Scot Honda. The season included five podium finishes and third place in the overall standings. He also won the Rookie of the Year award. In 2006, he remained with the team, who were now renamed as Humangest Racing. He won two races in Barcelona and Estoril and finished on the podium 11 times. He fought for the championship until the final race of the season, but had to settle for second place behind Jorge Lorenzo. The 2007 season saw him win two races in Istanbul and Donington and challenge once again for the championship, but he finished in second place once again.

=== MotoGP World Championship ===
==== Scot Racing Team (2008) ====
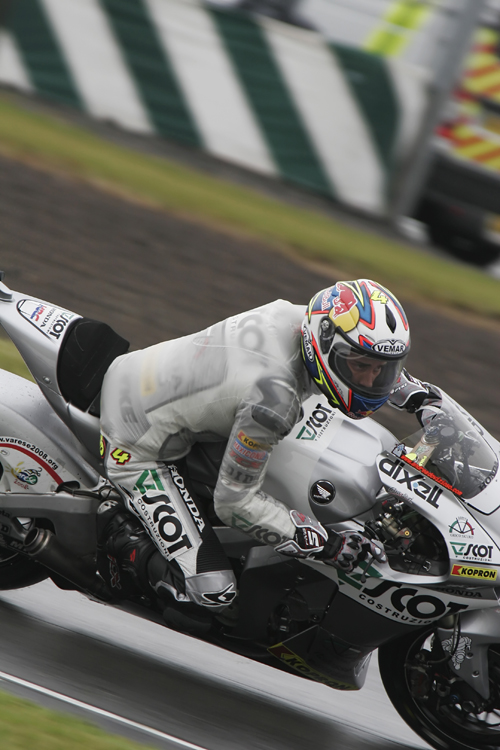
Dovizioso at the 2008 British Grand Prix

On 15 September 2007, Dovizioso announced that he would be making the move up to the MotoGP class with his existing team in 2008. On his premier class debut, Dovizioso achieved a highly credible fourth place, at the season opener in Qatar, passing Valentino Rossi on the final lap. Throughout the season, he was one of the most consistent Honda riders, placing fourth and fifth several times, and achieving a third place podium finish at the Malaysian MotoGP at Sepang. Dovizioso finished fifth in the final standings.

==== Repsol Honda Team (2009–2011) ====
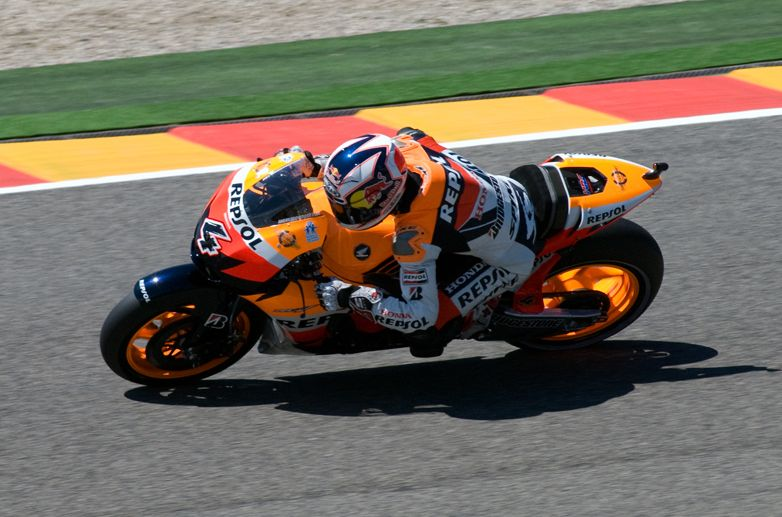
Dovizioso at the 2009 Italian Grand Prix

For the 2009 season, Dovizioso became an official Repsol Honda rider replacing Nicky Hayden and partnering Spain's Dani Pedrosa. In July 2009, Dovizioso won his first race in MotoGP at the British Grand Prix in wet conditions at Donington Park. Despite otherwise consistent points finishes, Dovizioso ended up with fewer points than in his début season in the class, finishing sixth in the final standings.

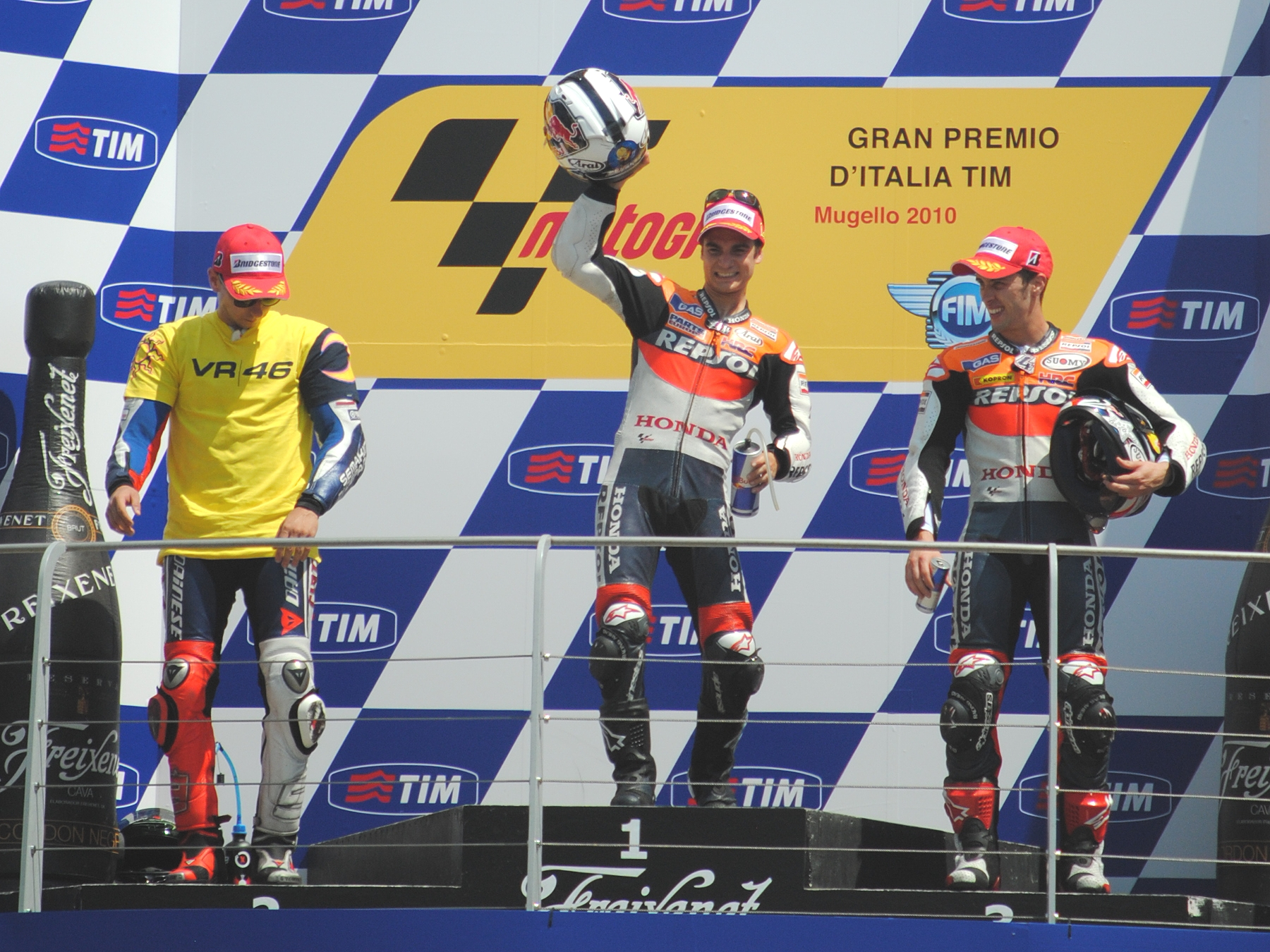
The podium after the 2010 Italian Grand Prix; Dovizioso (right) finished third, behind Jorge Lorenzo (left), and race-winner Dani Pedrosa (centre).

Dovizioso had a strong start to his second season with the Repsol Honda team, picking up a podium in the season-opening race in Qatar. Three more podiums followed early in the year before his results tailed off mid-season. Despite this, Dovizioso consistently collected points finishes and claimed his first pole position in MotoGP at the Japanese Grand Prix at Twin Ring Motegi. He went on to finish second in the race after challenging for the race win, equalling his result from the British Grand Prix. Dovizioso again finished second in the following race in Malaysia. Dovizioso retired in Australia, and concluded the season with third in Portugal and fifth in Valencia to finish fifth in the final championship standings.

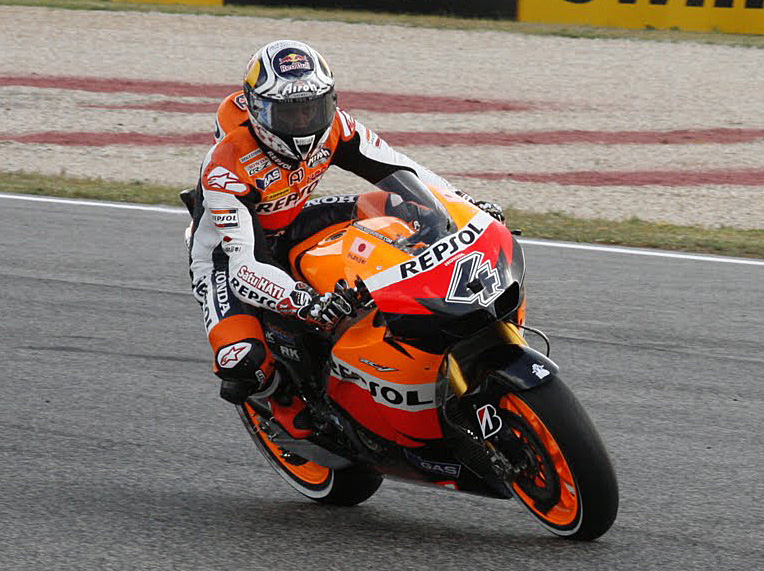
Dovizioso at the 2011 Portuguese Grand Prix

Dovizioso remained with Repsol Honda for a third consecutive season in 2011, riding in a three-bike team alongside Casey Stoner and Dani Pedrosa. Dovizioso started the season well, with a fourth place in Qatar after a race-long battle with Marco Simoncelli. At Jerez, Dovizioso experienced severe tyre wear and had to make a tyre change on his way to 12th place in the damp conditions. He took fourth place in Portugal, with a late-race pass on Valentino Rossi, before Le Mans saw Dovizioso's best performance of the season to that point. Having circulated in sixth for a portion of the race, he was helped by the collision between Pedrosa and Simoncelli, which saw Pedrosa crash out and Simoncelli given a ride-through penalty. He then passed Jorge Lorenzo and Rossi en route to a second-place finish. Fourth place followed in Catalunya, before another second place in Great Britain, having started fifth and led the first few laps before being overtaken by teammate Stoner. Dovizioso extended his podium run to four races after third in the Netherlands and second at his home race at Mugello.

Dovizioso finished second for the fourth time in 2011, in the Czech Republic; holding off pressure from Simoncelli. Two fifth places followed, before Dovizioso's only retirement of the season in Aragon, after crashing out. Dovizioso finished fifth in Japan, despite a ride-through penalty for jumping the start. Dovizioso finished third in Australia and Valencia, while the Malaysian race was cancelled after the death of Simoncelli in the first attempt to run the race.

Dovizioso ended the season third behind Jorge Lorenzo and Casey Stoner, but decided to move to the Tech3 Yamaha team for the 2012 season, alongside Cal Crutchlow on a one-year deal. He moved to the team after rejecting the offer of a satellite Honda bike, after Repsol Honda reverted to two bikes – for Stoner and Pedrosa – for the 2012 season.

==== Monster Yamaha Tech3 (2012) ====
Dovizioso achieved top-five placings in each of his first three starts for Tech3, with fifth places in Qatar and at Jerez, as well as a fourth place at the Portuguese Grand Prix. A seventh place followed at Le Mans, before his first podium of the season – a third place – at the Catalan Grand Prix. After missing out on points at the British Grand Prix due to a crash, Dovizioso finished third or fourth in each of the next six races – with four podiums – to maintain fourth place in the championship ahead of teammate Crutchlow.

Dovizioso won the Supermoto-Race on SIC Supermoto Day together with Mauno Hermunen, a race in honour of the memory of his compatriot Marco Simoncelli, who died in a race crash in 2011.

==== Ducati Team (2013–2020) ====
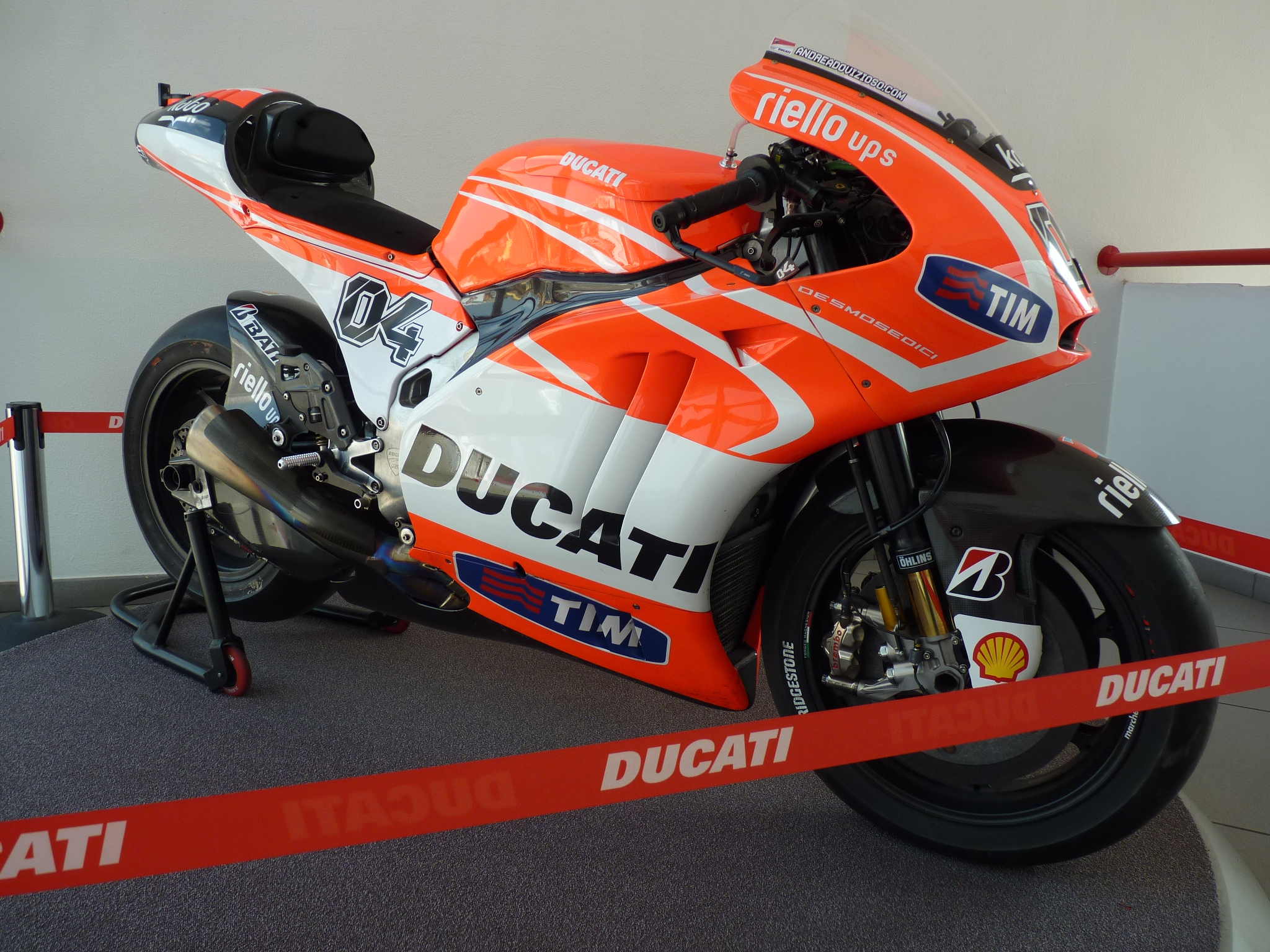
Ducati Desmosedici used by Dovizioso in the 2013 season

Following Valentino Rossi's move back to the factory Yamaha team, Dovizioso was signed by Ducati to replace Rossi in their factory team. Dovizioso had a difficult season on an under-performing Ducati Desmosedici, with a best place of fourth in wet conditions at the French Grand Prix. He ended the season eighth, behind Stefan Bradl and just ahead of teammate Nicky Hayden.

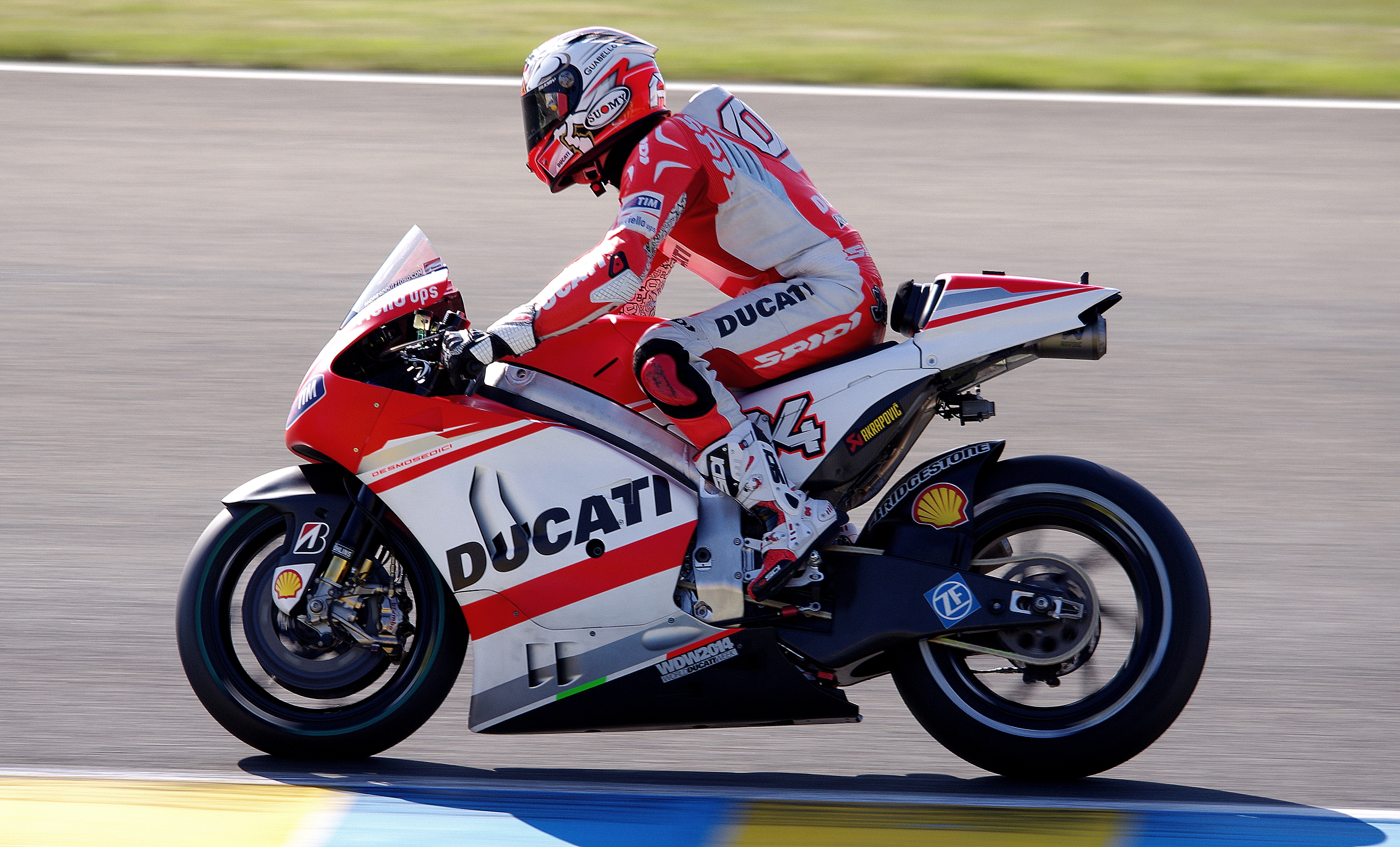
Dovizioso at the 2014 French Grand Prix

Dovizioso was joined at Ducati by his former Tech3 teammate Cal Crutchlow, reuniting the riders that raced with Tech3 in 2012. The season started in a positive way for Dovizioso, as he obtained three top-five results in the first four races, including a third place in the Grand Prix of the Americas in Texas and claimed his first pole position with Ducati in Japan, his first pole position since 2010. He ended the season fifth in the riders' championship.

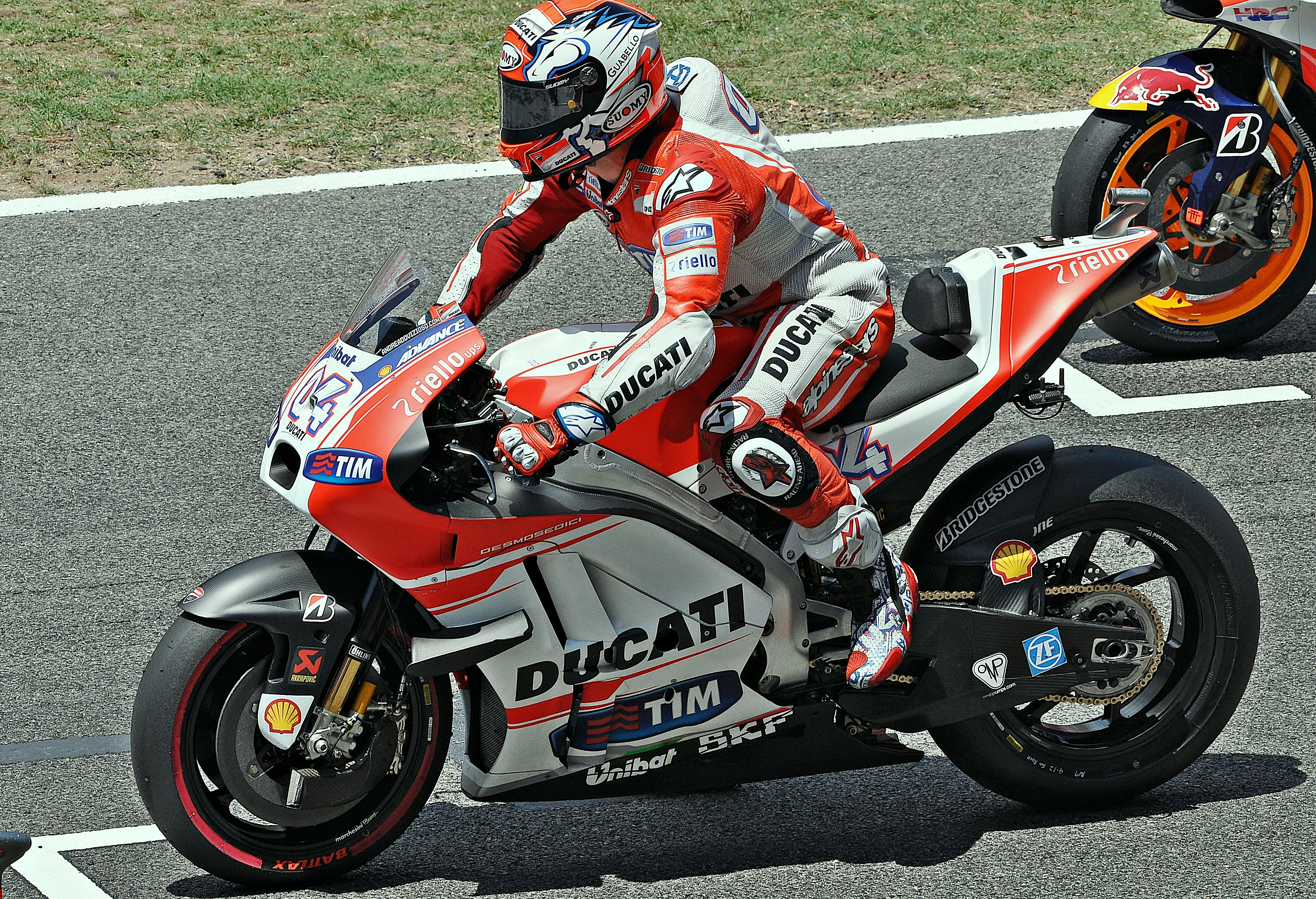
Dovizioso at the 2015 Catalan Grand Prix.

Dovizioso remained at Ducati for a third successive season, where he was joined by fellow Italian rider, Andrea Iannone, who moved from Pramac Racing. He took the first pole position of the season in Qatar, out-qualifying the rest of the field by 0.2 seconds. In the race, he started well and battled with the factory Yamahas of Valentino Rossi and Jorge Lorenzo. He finished in second place behind Rossi, taking his first podium since the Dutch TT in June 2014. Teammate Iannone finished just behind in third place, giving the factory team their first double podium finish since the 2010 Aragon Grand Prix. In the following two races, he finished in second position. However, Dovizioso's form took a huge dip as he struggled with mechanical and crashes. Having scored four podiums from the first five races, he only added one more to his total for the rest of the season. He finished seventh in the championship.

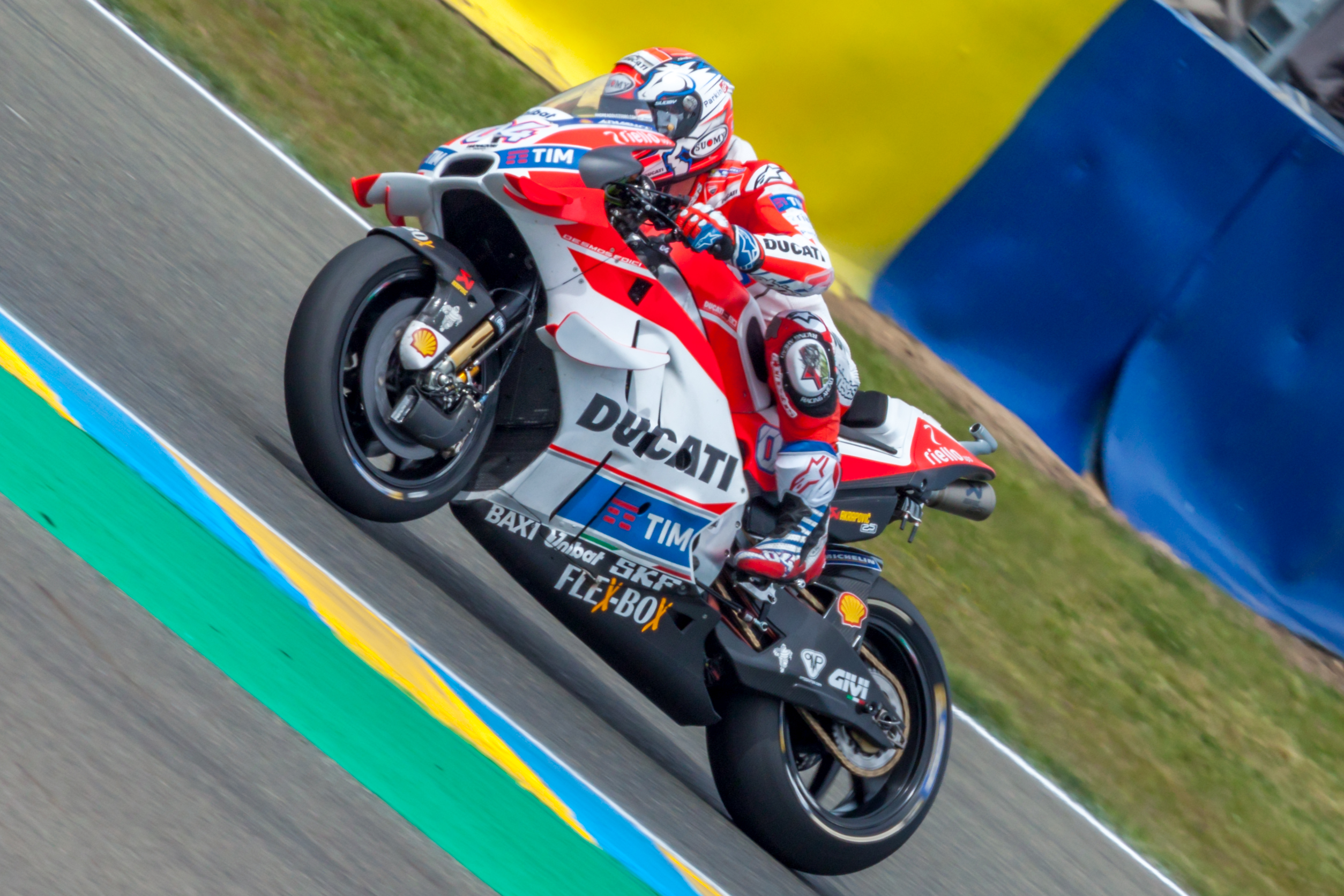
Dovizioso in 2016

Dovizioso started the season strongly in Qatar again, finishing second, but was taken out by his teammate in the Argentine Grand Prix when he was second, he ultimately limped over to finish 13th. He was taken out by Pedrosa in Austin while 3rd and had a water pump failure in Jerez to leave him well down the standings. Around this time it was announced that Jorge Lorenzo would be joining Ducati for 2017. A few weeks later, Ducati announced that Dovizioso was to stay at Ducati to partner Lorenzo, while Iannone signed a contract with the Suzuki team. In the inaugural Austrian Grand Prix, where Ducati were favourites to win, he finished second to his teammate Iannone, which left disappointed. However, he finished the season strongly and took only his second MotoGP win in the Malaysian Grand Prix ahead of Valentino Rossi and Jorge Lorenzo, his first win in seven years. He finished the season fifth in the championship.

Once again, Dovizioso started the season by finishing second in Qatar, this time to new factory Yamaha rider, Maverick Vinales. He was taken out again in Argentina, this time by Aleix Espargaro, before finishing sixth, fifth, and fourth in Austin, Jerez and Le Mans, however Ducati was pretty far behind the winner in those races. At the Italian Grand Prix, Dovizioso looked strong throughout practice and qualified third behind Vinales and Rossi. He controlled the pace in the race, didn't let Vinales get away and ultimately passed him and opened up a gap to win the race, becoming the first Italian rider to win the Italian Grand Prix on a Ducati motorcycle. It was also his first dry MotoGP victory. Seven days later in Catalunya, he astonishingly won the race again, having started seventh, ahead of Marquez, Pedrosa and his teammate. Back to back wins for Dovizioso put him only seven points behind Vinales at the top of the standings, though he had talked down the possibility of a title fight. With Vinales crashing in Assen, he took the lead of the championship. However, a series of mediocre results in Assen, Sachsenring and Brno put him down to third in the standings. He again took back-to-back wins in Austria and Great Britain, retaking the lead as Marquez retired due to blown engine. At the San Marino grand prix, he finished third and a seventh position at Aragon saw him lose the title lead to Marc Marquez once again. At the Japanese GP however, he took his fifth win of the season after passing Marquez on the final lap, reducing the deficit to 11 points. In the final round in Valencia, Dovizioso struggled, qualifying only 9th. Despite getting a tow from teammate Jorge Lorenzo, he ultimately crashed out of the race from fourth place with five laps remaining. He finished the season second, losing the world championship battle to Marc Marquez, with total of 6 wins.

Dovizioso took victory in the season opener in Qatar, beating Marc Márquez to the line. In total, he won four races in the 2018 MotoGP season (Qatar, Czech Republic, San Marino, and Valencia) with a total of nine podium finishes, ultimately finishing the championship as runner-up to Márquez for the second season in a row, with 245 points.

Dovizioso won at Qatar for the second year in a row and in Austria with a final corner overtake on Marc Márquez. He suffered a large accident at the British Grand Prix, where he was unable to avoid the low-siding Fabio Quartararo in front of him, running over the French rider's bike, sending Dovizioso airborne and falling head-first to the ground heavily. The accident caused him to have memory loss temporarily, which he would fully recover from. He scored nine podium finishes in the season, equalling his tally from the previous season. With 269 points – his highest career tally to date – Dovizioso finished second to Márquez for the third consecutive season.

In 2020, Dovizioso remained with Ducati. He achieved a third place podium finish at the season opener in Spain. Citing the deterioration of the working relationship between himself and Ducati – particularly team principal Gigi Dall'Igna – and Ducati's lack of commitment to a new contract, Dovizioso made a surprise announcement ahead of qualifying at the Austrian Grand Prix that he would leave Ducati at the end of the season. He went on to win the race the following day, in what would turn out to be his 14th and final victory with the Italian manufacturer. He finished the season in fourth place overall with 135 points, as the top Ducati rider for the fifth consecutive season.

==== Sabbatical ====
By the end of 2020, with no other immediate prospects, Dovizioso elected to take a sabbatical year in 2021 with his sights set on returning to racing for 2022. In early 2021, he was announced as a test rider for Aprilia Racing Team Gresini, with hopes of a potential race seat with the manufacturer for the following season, and he completed a number of test days.

Ultimately, the 2022 seat went to Spanish rider Maverick Viñales, who started with Aprilia early in September 2021, closing the door for Dovizioso with the Noale manufacturer.

==== Return with Petronas Yamaha SRT (2021) ====
Dovizioso was reported to have joined Petronas Yamaha by the British GP weekend, after Maverick Viñales left the Factory Yamaha Team and went to Aprilia Racing Team Gresini for the rest of 2021. That was later confirmed in the week leading up to the San Marino Grand Prix. Dovizioso will join Valentino Rossi for the rest of 2021, replacing Franco Morbidelli who moves up to the Factory team.

==== WithU Yamaha RNF MotoGP Team (2022) ====
Dovisioso returned to the rebranded WithU Yamaha RNF MotoGP satellite team, partnering with Darryn Binder. He was replaced by Cal Crutchlow after retiring from MotoGP at the end of the San Marino Grand Prix.

==== Yamaha Motor Racing test (2024–) ====
Dovizioso again tried out a MotoGP motorbike in a private test at the Misano Circuit on 20–21 August 2024. He was officially appointed by Yamaha as a substitute test rider, replacing Cal Crutchlow who was absent due to injury.

In 2025, Dovizioso was called as a test racer by Yamaha to add to their racers on the track in Sepang test. Dovizioso's reappearance at Yamaha comes after he spent time testing their YZR-M1 in the second half of last season, replacing the injured Cal Crutchlow.

On 19 June 2025, Dovizioso signed a new contract with Yamaha as a test rider until 2027. Not only that, he also took on a new role as Rider Performance Advisor, a strategic position to analyze the performance of Yamaha's main riders and convey it to team engineers. Previously, Dovizioso had taken part in Yamaha's V4 engine project and had tested the new prototype in a private test at the Catalunya Circuit some time ago.

=== Auto racing career ===
Dovizioso made his debut in auto racing when he participated in 2016 Lamborghini Super Trofeo at Circuit Ricardo Tormo round, driving a Lamborghini Huracán. He finished fourth in the first race in the Pro-Am class and won the second race.

It was announced in May 2019 that Dovizioso would take part in the Misano round of the 2019 DTM championship, driving an Audi RS5 Turbo DTM for W Racing Team (WRT). He raced as a substitute driver for Pietro Fittipaldi, who was briefly loaned to Team Rosberg from WRT as Jamie Green was absent due to appendicitis recovery. He qualified 15th for the first race and finished 12th, and started from 14th to finish 15th in the second race.

=== Motocross accident ===
In April 2024, Dovizioso suffered a motocross accident on his private circuit in Arezzo Province. He reportedly suffered a head injury in a motocross accident and was immediately flown to Careggi Hospital in Florence. Dovizioso suffered a head injury in the incident but it was not life-threatening. He regained consciousness and the results of the CT scan at the hospital were 'negative'. However, he was diagnosed with a broken right collarbone and further broken bones.

== Career statistics ==
=== CIV 125cc Championship ===
==== Races by year ====
(key) (Races in bold indicate pole position; races in italics indicate fastest lap)

Year	Bike	1	2	3	4	5	Pos	Pts
2001	Aprilia	MIS1; 2	MON; 2	VAL; Ret	MIS2; Ret	MIS3; 6	4th	50

=== Grand Prix motorcycle racing ===
==== By season ====
Season	Class	Motorcycle	Team	Race	Win	Podium	Pole	FLap	Pts	Plcd	WCh
2001	125cc	Aprilia RS125R	RCGM Rubicone Corse	1	0	0	0	0	0	NC	–
2002	125cc	Honda RS125R	Scot Racing Team	16	0	0	0	0	42	16th	–
2003	125cc	Honda RS125R	Team Scot	16	0	4	1	0	157	5th	–
2004	125cc	Honda RS125R	Kopron Team Scot	16	5	11	8	3	293	**1st**	1
2005	250cc	Honda RS250RW	Team Scot	16	0	5	0	1	189	**3rd**	–
2006	250cc	Honda RS250RW	Humangest Racing Team	16	2	11	2	4	272	**2nd**	–
2007	250cc	Honda RS250RW	Kopron Team Scot	17	2	10	2	3	260	**2nd**	–
2008	MotoGP	Honda RC212V	JiR Team Scot MotoGP	18	0	1	0	0	174	5th	–
2009	MotoGP	Honda RC212V	Repsol Honda Team	17	1	1	0	0	160	6th	–
2010	MotoGP	Honda RC212V	Repsol Honda Team	18	0	7	1	1	206	5th	–
2011	MotoGP	Honda RC212V	Repsol Honda Team	17	0	7	0	1	228	**3rd**	–
2012	MotoGP	Yamaha YZR-M1	Monster Yamaha Tech 3	18	0	6	0	0	218	4th	–
2013	MotoGP	Ducati Desmosedici GP13	Ducati Team	18	0	0	0	0	140	8th	–
2014	MotoGP	Ducati Desmosedici GP14	Ducati Team	18	0	2	1	0	187	5th	–
2015	MotoGP	Ducati Desmosedici GP15	Ducati Team	18	0	5	1	0	162	7th	–
2016	MotoGP	Ducati Desmosedici GP16	Ducati Team	18	1	5	2	1	171	5th	–
2017	MotoGP	Ducati Desmosedici GP17	Ducati Team	18	6	8	0	2	261	**2nd**	–
2018	MotoGP	Ducati Desmosedici GP18	Ducati Team	18	4	9	2	5	245	**2nd**	–
2019	MotoGP	Ducati Desmosedici GP19	Ducati Team	19	2	9	0	1	269	**2nd**	–
2020	MotoGP	Ducati Desmosedici GP20	Ducati Team	14	1	2	0	0	135	4th	–
2021	MotoGP	Yamaha YZR-M1	Petronas Yamaha SRT	5	0	0	0	0	12	24th	–
2022	MotoGP	Yamaha YZR-M1	WithU Yamaha RNF MotoGP Team	14	0	0	0	0	15	21st	–
Total				**346**	**24**	**103**	**20**	**22**	**3796**		**1**

==== By class ====
Class	Seasons	1st GP	1st Pod	1st Win	Race	Win	Podiums	Pole	FLap	Pts	WChmp
125cc	2001–2004	2001 Italy	2003 South Africa	2004 South Africa	49	5	15	9	3	492	1
250cc	2005–2007	2005 Spain	2005 Portugal	2006 Catalunya	49	4	26	4	8	721	0
MotoGP	2008–2022	2008 Qatar	2008 Malaysia	2009 Great Britain	248	15	62	7	11	2583	0
Total	2001–2022				**346**	**24**	**103**	**20**	**22**	**3796**	**1**

==== Races by year ====
(key) (Races in bold indicate pole position, races in italics indicate fastest lap)

Year	Class	Bike	1	2	3	4	5	6	7	8	9	10	11	12	13	14	15	16	17	18	19	20	Pos	Pts
2001	125cc	Aprilia	JPN	RSA	SPA	FRA	ITA; Ret	CAT	NED	GBR	GER	CZE	POR	VAL	PAC	AUS	MAL	RIO					NC	0
2002	125cc	Honda	JPN; Ret	RSA; 10	SPA; Ret	FRA; 9	ITA; 12	CAT; Ret	NED; 11	GBR; 9	GER; 13	CZE; 21	POR; Ret	RIO; 13	PAC; Ret	MAL; 15	AUS; 10	VAL; 17					16th	42
2003	125cc	Honda	JPN; 5	RSA; 2	SPA; 9	**FRA**; 3	ITA; 4	CAT; Ret	NED; 10	GBR; 2	GER; 7	CZE; 6	POR; 8	RIO; 6	PAC; 3	MAL; 13	AUS; Ret	VAL; 8					5th	157
2004	125cc	Honda	**RSA**; 1	SPA; 4	**FRA**; 1	ITA; 4	CAT; 2	NED; 4	RIO; 3	**GER**; 4	**GBR**; 1	CZE; 2	**POR**; Ret	**JPN**; 1	QAT; 2	**MAL**; 2	AUS; 1	**VAL**; 2					**1st**	**293**
2005	250cc	Honda	SPA; 4	POR; 2	CHN; 2	FRA; 3	ITA; 8	CAT; 3	NED; 7	GBR; 7	GER; 4	CZE; 6	JPN; 6	MAL; Ret	QAT; 3	AUS; 5	TUR; 5	VAL; 9					**3rd**	**189**
2006	250cc	Honda	SPA; 3	QAT; 2	TUR; 3	CHN; 2	**FRA**; 2	ITA; 3	**CAT**; 1	NED; 3	GBR; 6	GER; 4	CZE; 2	MAL; 2	AUS; 4	JPN; 4	POR; 1	VAL; 7					**2nd**	**272**
2007	250cc	Honda	QAT; 5	SPA; 3	**TUR**; 1	CHN; 3	FRA; 2	ITA; 4	CAT; 3	GBR; 1	NED; 4	GER; 5	CZE; 2	RSM; Ret	**POR**; 2	JPN; 2	AUS; 3	MAL; 11	VAL; 4				**2nd**	**260**
2008	MotoGP	Honda	QAT; 4	SPA; 8	POR; Ret	CHN; 11	FRA; 6	ITA; 8	CAT; 4	GBR; 5	NED; 5	GER; 5	USA; 4	CZE; 9	RSM; 8	INP; 5	JPN; 9	AUS; 7	MAL; 3	VAL; 4			5th	174
2009	MotoGP	Honda	QAT; 5	JPN; 5	SPA; 8	FRA; 4	ITA; 4	CAT; 4	NED; Ret	USA; Ret	GER; Ret	GBR; 1	CZE; 4	INP; 4	RSM; 4	POR; 7	AUS; 6	MAL; Ret	VAL; 8				6th	160
2010	MotoGP	Honda	QAT; 3	SPA; 6	FRA; 3	ITA; 3	GBR; 2	NED; 5	CAT; 14	GER; 5	USA; 4	CZE; Ret	INP; 5	RSM; 4	ARA; Ret	**JPN**; 2	MAL; 2	AUS; Ret	POR; 3	VAL; 5			5th	206
2011	MotoGP	Honda	QAT; 4	SPA; 12	POR; 4	FRA; 2	CAT; 4	GBR; 2	NED; 3	ITA; 2	GER; 4	USA; 5	CZE; 2	INP; 5	RSM; 5	ARA; Ret	JPN; 5	AUS; 3	MAL; C	VAL; 3			**3rd**	**228**
2012	MotoGP	Yamaha	QAT; 5	SPA; 5	POR; 4	FRA; 7	CAT; 3	GBR; 19	NED; 3	GER; 3	ITA; 3	USA; 4	INP; 3	CZE; 4	RSM; 4	ARA; 3	JPN; 4	MAL; 13	AUS; 4	VAL; 6			4th	218
2013	MotoGP	Ducati	QAT; 7	AME; 7	SPA; 8	FRA; 4	ITA; 5	CAT; 7	NED; 10	GER; 7	USA; 9	INP; 10	CZE; 7	GBR; Ret	RSM; 8	ARA; 8	MAL; 8	AUS; 9	JPN; 10	VAL; 9			8th	140
2014	MotoGP	Ducati	QAT; 5	AME; 3	ARG; 9	SPA; 5	FRA; 8	ITA; 6	CAT; 8	NED; 2	GER; 8	INP; 7	CZE; 6	GBR; 5	RSM; 4	ARA; Ret	**JPN**; 5	AUS; 4	MAL; 8	VAL; 4			5th	187
2015	MotoGP	Ducati	**QAT**; 2	AME; 2	ARG; 2	SPA; 9	FRA; 3	ITA; Ret	CAT; Ret	NED; 12	GER; Ret	INP; 9	CZE; 6	GBR; 3	RSM; 8	ARA; 5	JPN; 5	AUS; 13	MAL; Ret	VAL; 7			7th	162
2016	MotoGP	Ducati	QAT; 2	ARG; 13	AME; Ret	SPA; Ret	FRA; Ret	ITA; 5	CAT; 7	**NED**; Ret	GER; 3	AUT; 2	CZE; Ret	GBR; 6	RSM; 6	ARA; 11	JPN; 2	AUS; 4	**MAL**; 1	VAL; 7			5th	171
2017	MotoGP	Ducati	QAT; 2	ARG; Ret	AME; 6	SPA; 5	FRA; 4	ITA; 1	CAT; 1	NED; 5	GER; 8	CZE; 6	AUT; 1	GBR; 1	RSM; 3	ARA; 7	JPN; 1	AUS; 13	MAL; 1	VAL; Ret			2nd	261
2018	MotoGP	Ducati	QAT; 1	ARG; 6	AME; 5	SPA; Ret	FRA; Ret	ITA; 2	CAT; Ret	NED; 4	GER; 7	**CZE**; 1	AUT; 3	GBR; C	RSM; 1	ARA; 2	THA; 2	**JPN**; 18	AUS; 3	MAL; 6	VAL; 1		2nd	245
2019	MotoGP	Ducati	QAT; 1	ARG; 3	AME; 4	SPA; 4	FRA; 2	ITA; 3	CAT; Ret	NED; 4	GER; 5	CZE; 2	AUT; 1	GBR; Ret	RSM; 6	ARA; 2	THA; 4	JPN; 3	AUS; 7	MAL; 3	VAL; 4		2nd	269
2020	MotoGP	Ducati	SPA; 3	ANC; 6	CZE; 11	AUT; 1	STY; 5	RSM; 7	EMI; 8	CAT; Ret	FRA; 4	ARA; 7	TER; 13	EUR; 8	VAL; 8	POR; 6							4th	135
2021	MotoGP	Yamaha	QAT	DOH	POR	SPA	FRA	ITA	CAT	GER	NED	STY	AUT	GBR	ARA	RSM; 21	AME; 13	EMI; 13	ALR; 14	VAL; 12			24th	12
2022	MotoGP	Yamaha	QAT; 14	INA; Ret	ARG; 20	AME; 15	POR; 11	SPA; 17	FRA; 16	ITA; 20	CAT; Ret	GER; 14	NED; 16	GBR; 16	AUT; 15	RSM; 12	ARA	JPN	THA	AUS	MAL	VAL	21st	15

=== Complete Lamborghini Super Trofeo Europe results ===
Year	Team	Car	Class	1	2	3	4	5	6	7	8	9	10	11	12	Pos.	Pts.	Class Pos.	Pts.
2022	(Italy) Lamborghini Squadra Corse	Huracán LP620-2 Super Trofeo	**Pro-Am**	MON1	MON2	SIL1	SIL2	PAU1	PAU2	SPA1	SPA2	NUR1	NUR2	VAL1; 4	VAL2; 1	**NA**	**NA**	**NA**	**NA**

=== Complete Deutsche Tourenwagen Masters results ===
(key) (Races in bold indicate pole position) (Races in italics indicate fastest lap)

Year	Team	Car	1	2	3	4	5	6	7	8	9	10	11	12	13	14	15	16	17	18	Pos	Pts
2019	Audi Sport Team WRT	Audi RS5 Turbo DTM	HOC1	HOC2	ZOL1	ZOL2	MIS1; 12	MIS2; 15	NOR1	NOR2	ASS1	ASS2	BRH1	BRH2	LAU1	LAU2	NÜR1	NÜR2	HOC1	HOC2	19th	0
