= Forum Popilii =

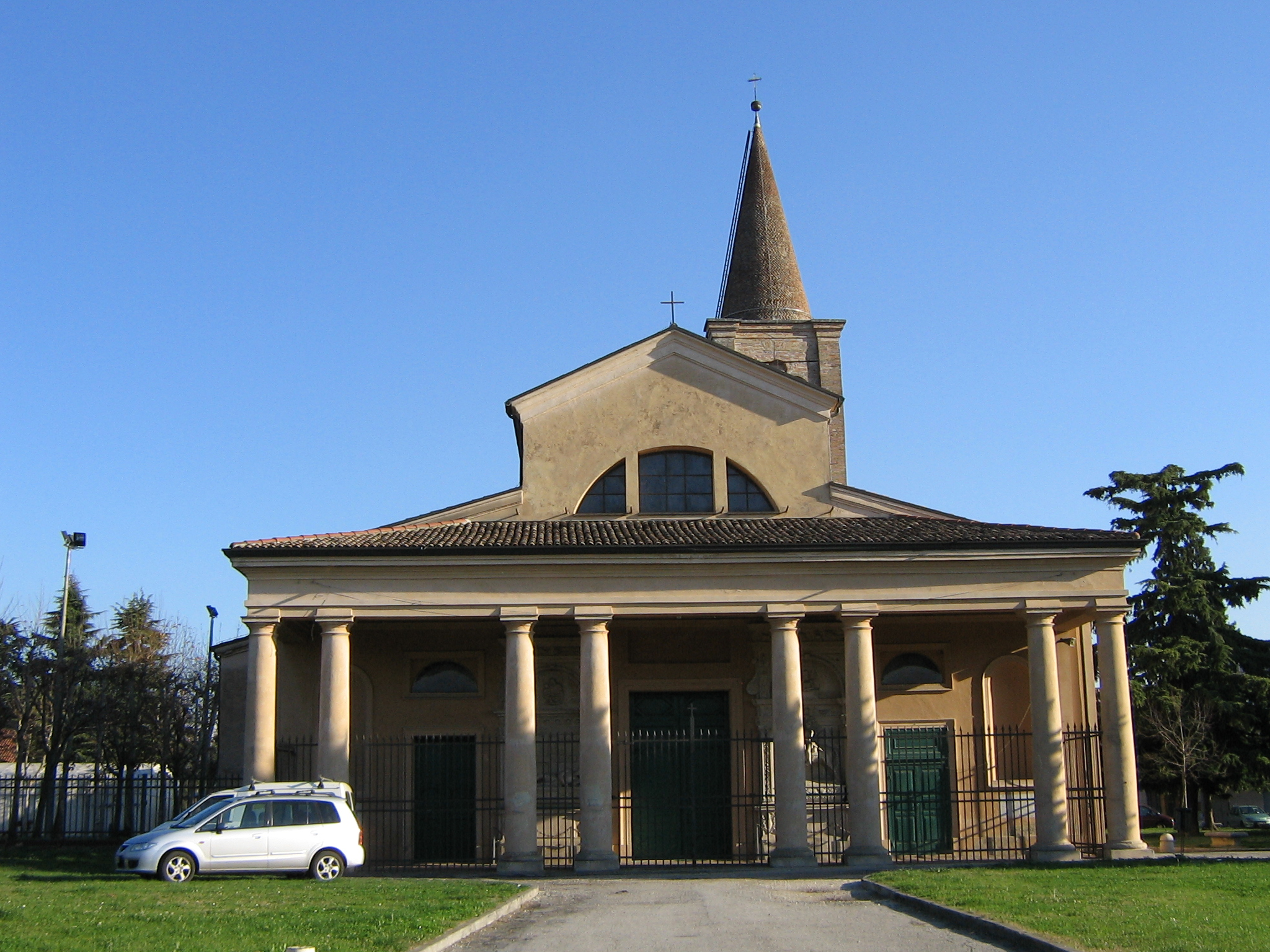
Basilica of San Rufillo in the titular see

Forum Popilii (Italian: Forlimpopoli) is a Catholic titular see. The current Titular Bishop of Forum Popilii is Robert Joseph Fisher.

== History ==
Forum Popilii, today Forlimpopoli, near Forlì in Italy, was founded in 173 BC by the Consul M. Popilius Laenas. The first bishop is supposed to have been St. Rufillus, appointed by Pope Sylvester, and he is supposed to have transformed a temple of Isis into a church. At all events Rufillus is the patron of the city, and the church in which his body is preserved is said to have been an ancient temple of Hercules.

In 500 Asellus, Bishop of Forlimpopoli, was present at the Roman synod that passed on the election of Pope Simmaeus, and in 649 Bishop Stephen attended the Roman council concerning the Monothelites. This city had much to suffer from the Lombards, and in 665 or 670, while the people were assembled in the cathedral for the ceremonies of Holy Saturday, it was suddenly attacked by King Grimoald, who pillaged it and butchered numbers of the people and clergy.

By the donation of Pepin, Forlimpopoli with the other cities of the exarchate and the Pentapolis was made a part of the patrimony of St. Peter. In 1073 during the episcopate of Pietro, Peter Damian went to Forlimpopoli to reform ecclesiastical disciplines, and on this occasion is thought to have delivered a sermon on Rufillus, which Vecchiazzani, an historian of this city, claims to have discovered at Rimini in the Library of St. Jerome. But this is very doubtful.

Among the successive bishops, Ubertello (1214) and Taddeo (1285) were noted for their beneficence and their efforts for the preservation of peace. During the 14th century, Romagna was at the mercy of petty tyrants and Forlimpopoli was ruled by the Ordelaffi of Forlì. Pope Innocent VI first tried censures as a means of enforcing his commands as sovereign, and sent Cardinal Albornoz to Forlimpopoli (1355). Francesco II Ordelaffi, however, when the cardinal had left, burned the statue of the pope in the public square, and was guilty of great cruelty towards the clergy.

In 1360, Albornoz took the city by force, obliged the inhabitants to abandon it, and razed it to the ground. The episcopal see was then transferred to Bertinoro, and the bishop, Roberto dei Resinelli, an Augustinian, took with him the relics of Rufillus. Forlimpopoli was gradually rebuilt, and Pope Leo XII restored La Polla to the rank of a city. The bishop, however, remained at Bertinoro.

== Sources ==
- Catholic Encyclopedia article, Diocese of Bertinoro
- Catholic Hierarchy page
