= Forlimpopoli =

- Comune
- Comune di Forlimpopoli
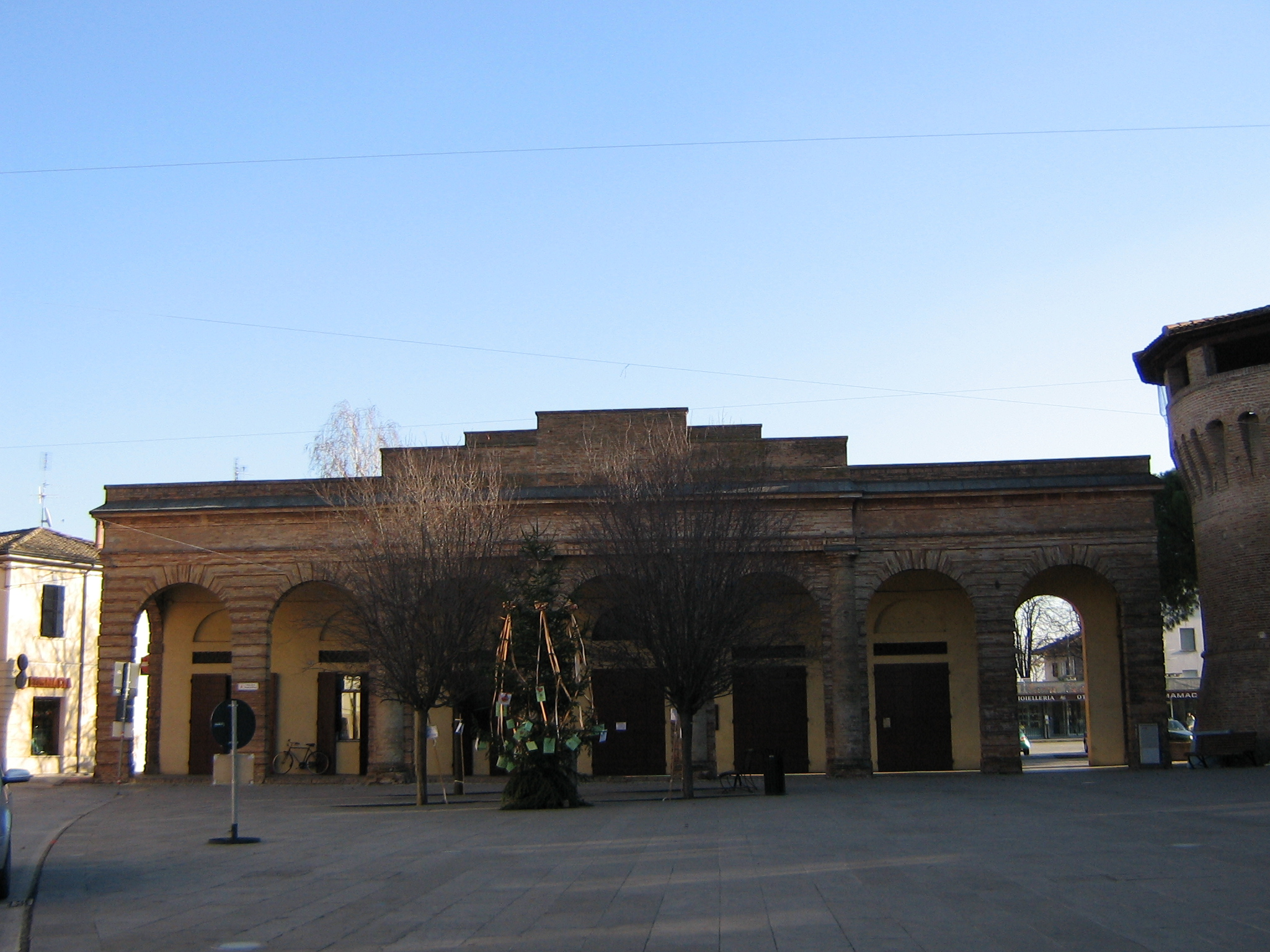
- Gate in Forlimpopoli

- Coat of arms

- Location within Italy Location within Emilia-Romagna
- Coordinates: 44°11′N 12°08′E
- Country: Italy
- Region: Emilia-Romagna
- Province: Forlì-Cesena (FC)
- Frazioni: San Leonardo in Schiova, San Pietro ai Prati, Sant'Andrea in Rossano, Selbagnone

Government
  - Mayor: Mauro Grandini

Area
  - Total: 24 km^{2} (9.3 sq mi)
- Elevation: 33 m (108 ft)

Population (31 March 2012)
  - Total: 13,184
  - Density: 550/km^{2} (1,400/sq mi)
- Demonym: Forlimpopolesi
- Time zone: UTC+1 (CET)
  - Summer (DST): UTC+2 (CEST)
- Postal code: 47034
- Dialing code: 0543
- Patron saint: St. Rufillus
- Saint day: May 16
- Website: Official website

Forlimpopoli (Italian pronunciation: [forlimˈpɔːpoli]; Romagnol: Frampùl) is a town and comune in the province of Forlì-Cesena, north-eastern Italy. It is located on the Via Emilia between Cesena and Forlì.

== History ==
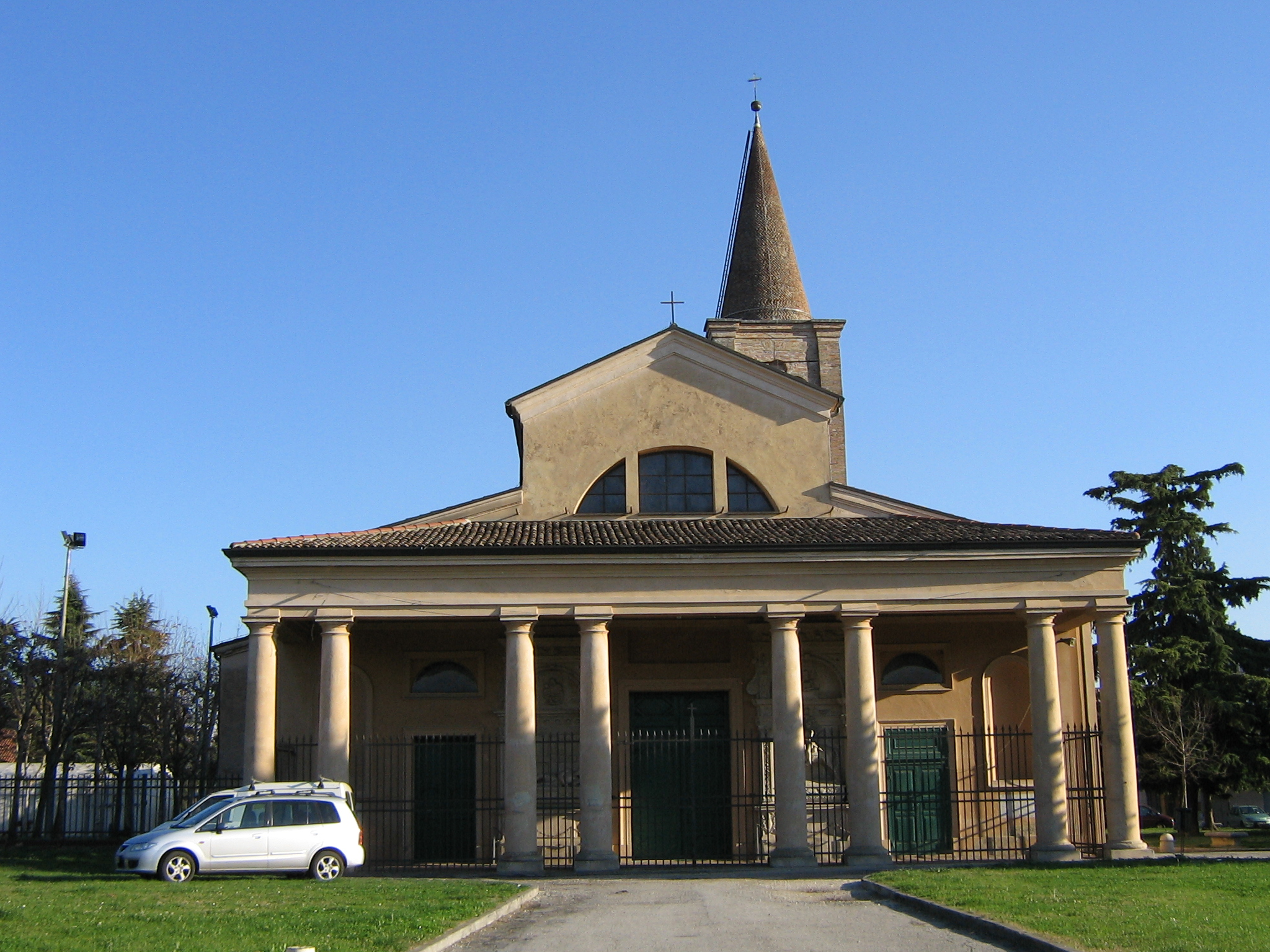
Basilica of San Rufillo

The name of Forlimpopoli derives from the Roman Forum Popilii, most likely connected to the consul Publius Popillius Laenas, who founded it in 132 BC. The area has been inhabited since Palaeolithic times, as proved by recent archaeological discoveries. Later it was settled by the Umbri and the Gauls from the Pianura Padana. In the 1st century BC Forum Popili become a municipium, and flourished due to its location near the important port of Classis (for which it provided amphorae for wine transport), as well as its own agricultural production.

It started to decay in the 3rd century AD, and, as in the High Middle Ages the area became marshy, its agricultural output fell drastically. In this period it was part of the Byzantine Exarchate of Ravenna and had its first Catholic bishop in the 5th century; over his sepulchre, outside the town, a Benedictine monastery was founded. In the 7th century Forlimpopoli was ravaged by the Lombard king Grimoald; in the following century it fell under Papal rule. Later the city started to grow again with the foundation of another burgh, the Civitas Nova, and with the communal autonomy.

In the 13th century it became a fief of the Ordelaffi family from Forlì. Their expansion was momentarily halted by the Papal reconquest by Cardinal Gil de Albornoz who, in 1361, ordered the destruction of Forlimpopoli due to its loyalty to the Ordelaffi. A chronicle from ten years later states that the town no longer existed, the bishopric having been moved to Bertinoro, and the cathedral having been replaced by a fortress, the current Rocca. A few years later Sinibaldo Ordelaffi, now in peaceful terms with the Popes, had the town rebuilt with the construction of a line of walls. In the 15th and 16th centuries it was a possession of several families, including the Riario and Cesare Borgia. In 1535 it was returned to the Papal States, who assigned it in turn as a fief to the Zampeschi family, followed by the Savelli and the Cardinal Capponi. Direct Papal authority was restored after the Napoleonic Wars.

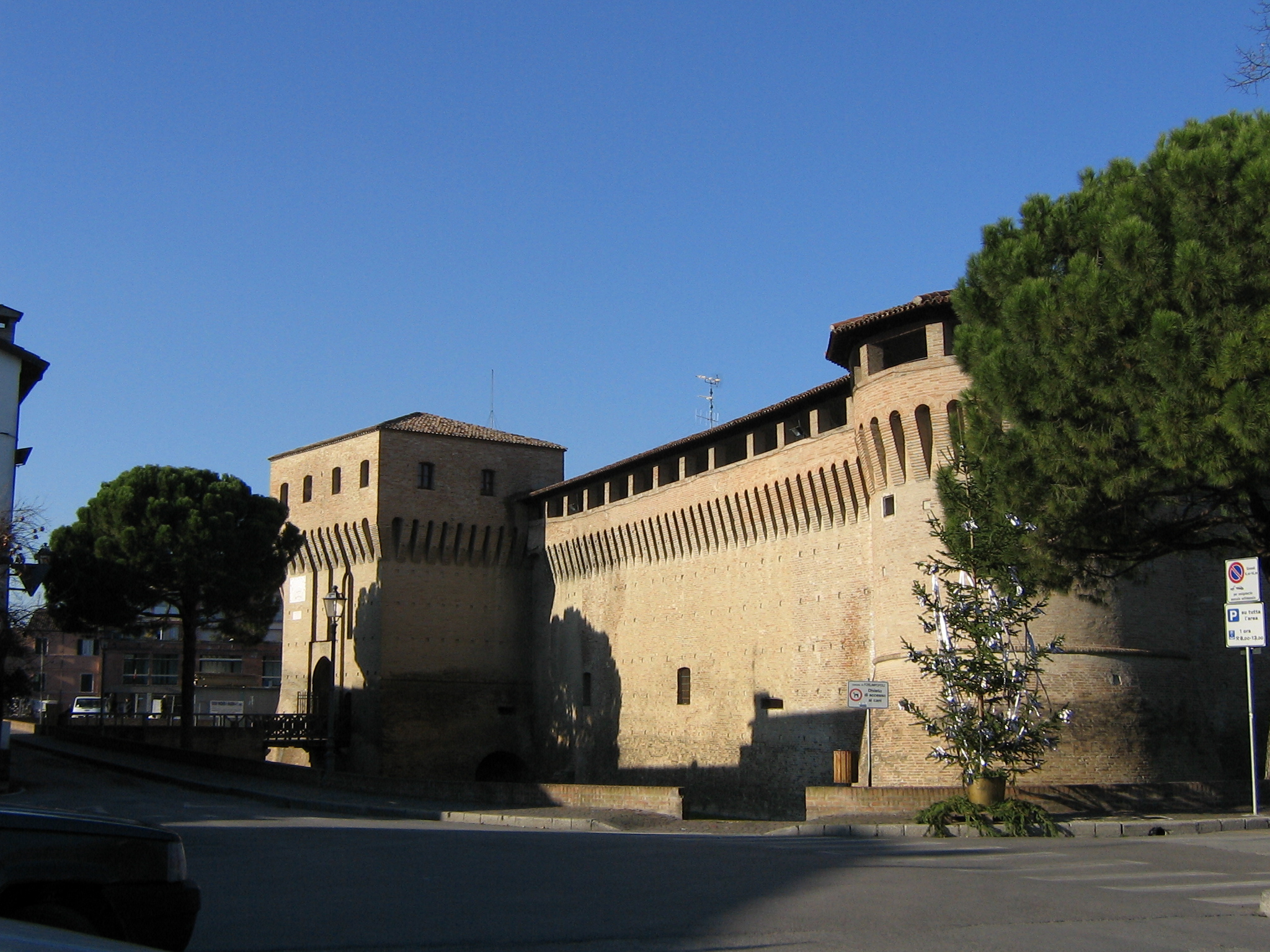
Castle of Forlimpopoli

== Main sights ==
An imposing and very well-preserved castle from the 16th century lies in the centre of the town. It houses the local government, the archeological museum, a theatre and the music school.

Outside the town is the Sanctuary of Santa Maria delle Grazie di Fornò, one of the most notable circular plan churches in Italy (late 15th century). It features two works by Agostino di Duccio. The basilica of San Rufillo was originally built in the 6th century but it is now a more recent reconstruction; it is home to two canvases by Luca Longhi and Francesco Menzocchi, and the tomb of Brunoro II Zampeschi, lord of Forlimpopoli.

The church of the Servi (mid-15th century) has a painting by Marco Palmezzano.

== Culture ==
The "Scuola di Musica Popolare di Forlimpopoli" was founded by the commune of Forlimpopoli and is now carried by an association of teachers and students. The main focus of teaching is the traditional folk music of the region. The music school has a supra-regional importance. In cooperation with the academy Fürsteneck Castle in Germany and the Eric Sahlström Institutet in Sweden it developed the "European Nyckelharpa Training".

== Twinned cities ==
- Villeneuve-Loubet, France
- Traun, Austria

== Notable people ==
- Andrea Dovizioso, Italian MotoGP rider
- Pellegrino Artusi, author of one of the earliest cookery book
- Marco Uccellini, Baroque violinist and composer
- Vincenzo Balzani, chemist
- Daniel Hackett, American-Italian basketball player who currently plays for Brose Bamberg
- Eleazaro Rossi, stand-up comedian

== See also ==
- Forum Popilii – the bishopric, now a titular see
