= Pellegrino Artusi =

Italian businessman and writer (1820–1911)

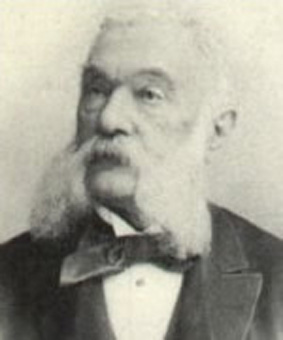
- Artusi in 1891
- Born: Pellegrino Marcello Artusi; 4 August 1820; Forlimpopoli, Grand Duchy of Tuscany
- Died: 30 March 1911 (aged 90); Florence, Kingdom of Italy
- Occupations: Businessman and cookbook author

Pellegrino Artusi (Italian: [pelleˈɡriːno arˈtuːzi]; Forlimpopoli, near Forlì, August 4, 1820 – Florence, March 30, 1911) was an Italian businessman and writer, best known as the author of the 1891 cookbook La scienza in cucina e l'arte di mangiar bene (Science in the Kitchen and the Art of Eating Well).

== Biography ==
The son of the wealthy merchant Agostino (nicknamed Buratèl, or "little eel") and Teresa Giunchi, Pellegrino Marcello Artusi came from a large family: he had 12 siblings. He was named Pellegrino in honor of Saint Pellegrino Latiosi of Forlì. Like many wealthy children, he attended a seminary school in the nearby town of Bertinoro.

Between the years 1835 and 1850, Artusi spent a great deal of time in student circles in Bologna (in one of his works he claims to have been enrolled at the University). In the bar Tre Re he met the patriot Felice Orsini, from Meldola another town near Forlì.

When he returned to his hometown, he took over his father's business, making quite a bit of money, but the lives of the Artusi family were permanently disrupted by the arrival in Forlimpopoli on January 25, 1851, of the outlaw Stefano Pelloni, nicknamed il Passatore, "the Ferryman". He took all of the upper-class families hostage, one by one, and held them captive in the city theater, including Pellegrino Artusi's family. After stealing as much as possible, the bandits raped several women, one of whom was Gertrude, Artusi's sister, who went crazy from the shock and had to be put in an asylum in Pesaro.

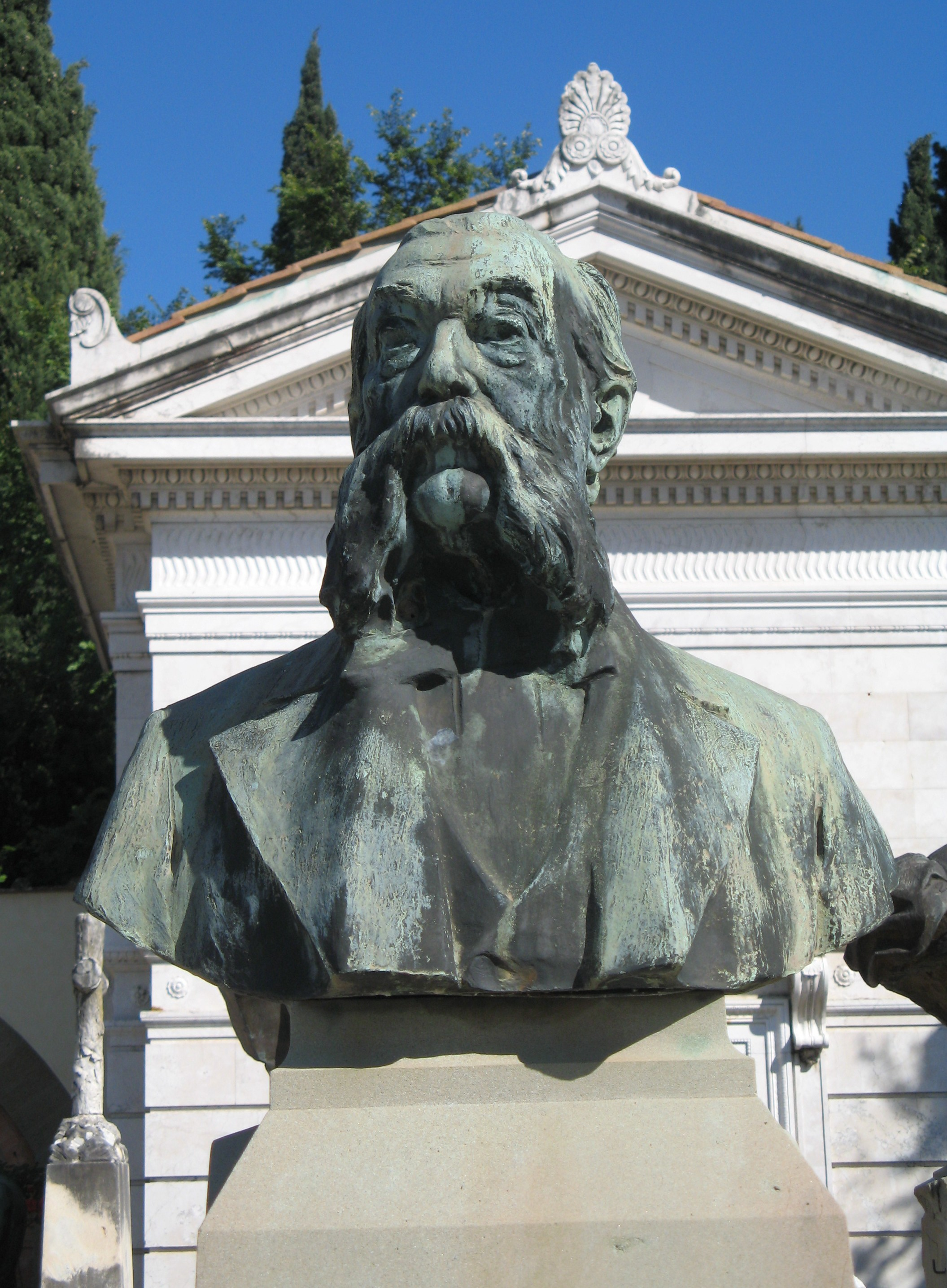
Bust of Pellegrino Artusi by sculptor Italo Vagnetti at the Porte Sante cemetery in Florence

The following year, the family moved to Florence. Here, Pellegrino began working in finances, and he also dedicated his time to two of his favorite hobbies: literature and the art of cooking. His sisters got married and his parents died and so he was able to live off his inheritance thanks to the land the family had in Romagna (in Borgo Pieve Sestina di Cesena and Sant'Andrea di Forlimpopoli). He bought a house in D'Azeglio Square in Florence, where he quietly lived out his life until 1911, when he died at age 90. Single, he lived with just a butler from his hometown and a Tuscan cook. He was buried in the Porte Sante cemetery, part of the basilica of San Miniato al Monte.

His most famous work is La scienza in cucina e l'arte di mangiar bene (Science in the Kitchen and the Art of Eating Well). The title is clearly of a positivist bent; Artusi worshipped progress and the scientific method, which he used in his book. He was also an admirer of the physiologist Paolo Mantegazza. His book, in fact, can be considered a "scientifically tested" manual: every recipe was the result of trials and experiments.

Writing only two decades after the unification of Italy (Risorgimento), Artusi was the first to include recipes from all the different regions of Italy in a single cookbook. He is often credited with establishing a truly national Italian cuisine for the first time, and even the French cook Auguste Escoffier took inspiration from him.

=== The case of minestrone and cholera ===
Of particular interest is the story told by Artusi himself regarding a bad experience which occurred during the summer in Livorno in 1855, when Artusi came in contact with cholera, the infectious disease that in that era took many lives in Italy.

Once in Livorno, Artusi went to a restaurant to have dinner. After eating minestrone, he decided to rent a room in the building belonging to a man called Domenici. As Artusi would later recount, he spent the whole night suffering from horrible stomach pains, which he blamed on the minestrone he had eaten. The next day, returning to Florence, he got the news that Livorno had been hit by cholera and that Domenici had been a victim. It was only then that he realized what had happened: it had not been the minestrone that made him ill, but the early symptoms of the disease. The event inspired Artusi to write an excellent recipe for minestrone.

== Works ==
There are three works by Artusi: two non-fiction books and a cooking manual. The non-fiction works, a biography of Ugo Foscolo and a critique of Giuseppe Giusti, went largely unnoticed and quickly went out of print.

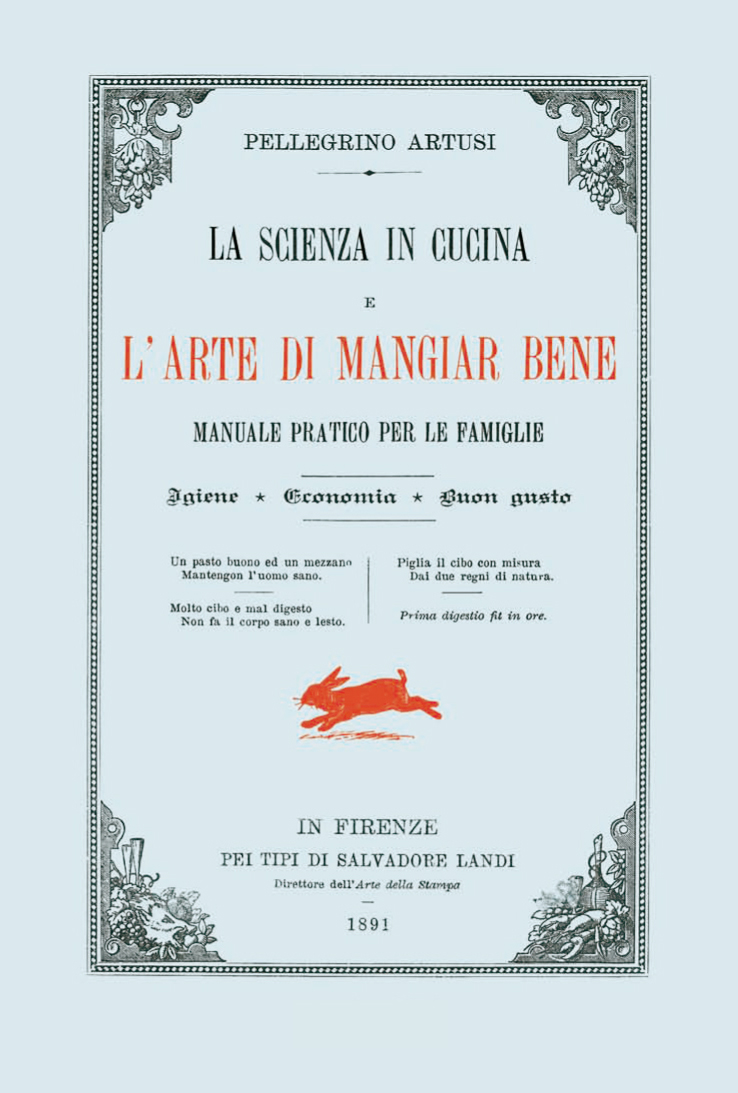
Cover of the first edition (1891)

His manual, however, entitled La scienza in cucina e l'arte di mangiar bene (Science in the Kitchen and the Art of Eating Well), published in Florence in 1891, was much more successful. He could not find a publisher so he used his own money to self-publish, selling a thousand copies of the first edition in four years. Soon, however, the cookbook became popular, and before Artusi died, more than 200,000 copies had been sold. Regarded as the bible of Italian cookbooks, it is filled with amusing anecdotes as well as 790 recipes. The book is a perennial best seller in Italy, and has been translated into Spanish, French, Dutch, German, English and, most recently, Portuguese and Polish.

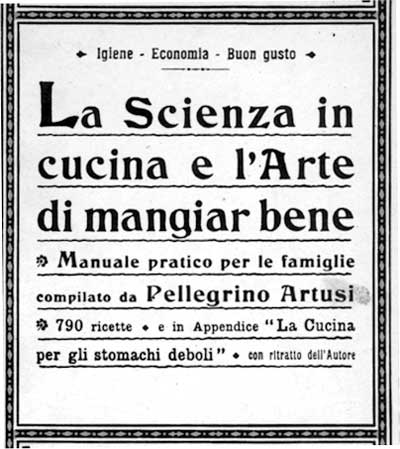
Cover from a 1910 edition of La scienza in cucina e l'arte di mangiar bene (Science in the Kitchen and the Art of Eating Well)

In 1904, Artusi published a practical manual for the kitchen, with over 3,000 recipes and 150 tables, simply entitled Ecco il tuo libro di cucina (Here is Your Cookbook) with the anonymous participation and influence of the baroness Giulia Turco.

== Dedications ==
=== Festa artusiana – Artusi Festival ===
Since 1997, the municipality of Forlimpopoli, Artusi's hometown, has celebrated Artusi with the "Festa Artusiana", an event completely dedicated to food in all of its forms: gastronomy, culture, and entertainment. Each year during this festival the "Pellegrino Artusi Prize" is awarded to the person who gives the 'most original contribution to the relationship between man and food', and the "Marietta Prize", named after Pellegrino Artusi's collaborator, is given to a housewife or househusband 'who are—in the spirit of Pellegrino and Marietta—able homemakers'.

Also in Forlimpopoli, Casa Artusi is described as "a living museum of Italian cookery that was created to honor Artusi, one of its most famous citizens".

== Editions ==
- La Scienza in Cucina E L'arte Di Mangiar Bene, Grandi Tascabili Economici 1975. ISBN 88-7983-555-6.
- La Scienza in Cucina E L'arte Di Mangiar Bene. Torino: Einaudi, 2001. ISBN 8806158856.
- Science in the Kitchen and the Art of Eating Well, University of Toronto Press 2003. ISBN 0-8020-8657-8.
- Exciting Food for Southern Types. London: Penguin, 2011. ISBN 9780241951101. Excerpts.
