= Eugenio Prati =

Italian painter (1842–1907)

Eugenio Prati (27 January 1842 - 8 March 1907) was a painter, active in the Trentino, Austria-Hungary, painting genre subjects.

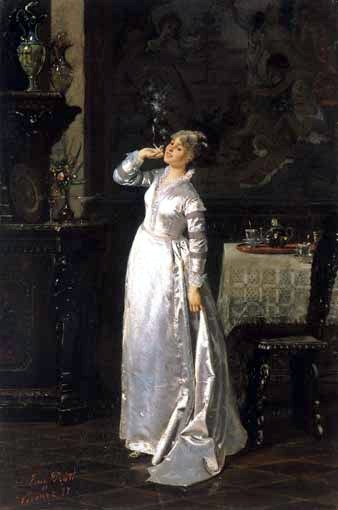
Portrait of Baronessa Giulia Turco Turcato Lazzari (1877)

== Biography ==
Prati was born in Caldonazzo in the Trentino, Austrian Empire. He trained at the Academy of Fine Arts of Venice, and then continued studying in Florence under the patronage of a local baron of Trentino. In 1879, he returned to Trentino, and settled in the Valsugana. He painted mainly rural genre themes, although also some sacred and historic subjects, and costume genre paintings.

He exhibited Ancora un momento and Ritorno da Massaua at the 1887 Esposizione Nazionale di Venezia, and the painting Primi fioriin 1892 in Venice, which he sent to exhibitions over the next 5 years in Genoa, Chicago, Berlin, and St. Petersburg. He painted Portrait of Maria Sardagna Thun and a Veduta di Passo Buole.

Other works include Abile, Si espetta lo sposo, Time is Money, Nozze in Val di Tesino, and Uomo che piange e preso.
