= Salvatore Turco =

American biochemist, academic, and author

Salvatore J. Turco is an American molecular and cellular biochemist, currently the Antonio S. Turco Endowed Professor at University of Kentucky. Turco is also a published author.

== Education ==
Turco received a Bachelor of Science from Indiana University of Pennsylvania and a Ph.D. from the University of Pittsburgh.
