= Del Turco (surname) =

Del Turco is an Italian surname. Notable people with the surname include:

- Flaminio del Turco (died 1634), Italian architect and sculptor
- Ottaviano Del Turco (born 1944), Italian politician
- Riccardo Del Turco (born 1939), Italian singer
- Marquis Stefano Rosselli del Turco (1877–1947), Italian chess player, writer and publisher

== See also ==
- Turco (surname)
- Del Turco (disambiguation)
