= Rosselli del Turco =

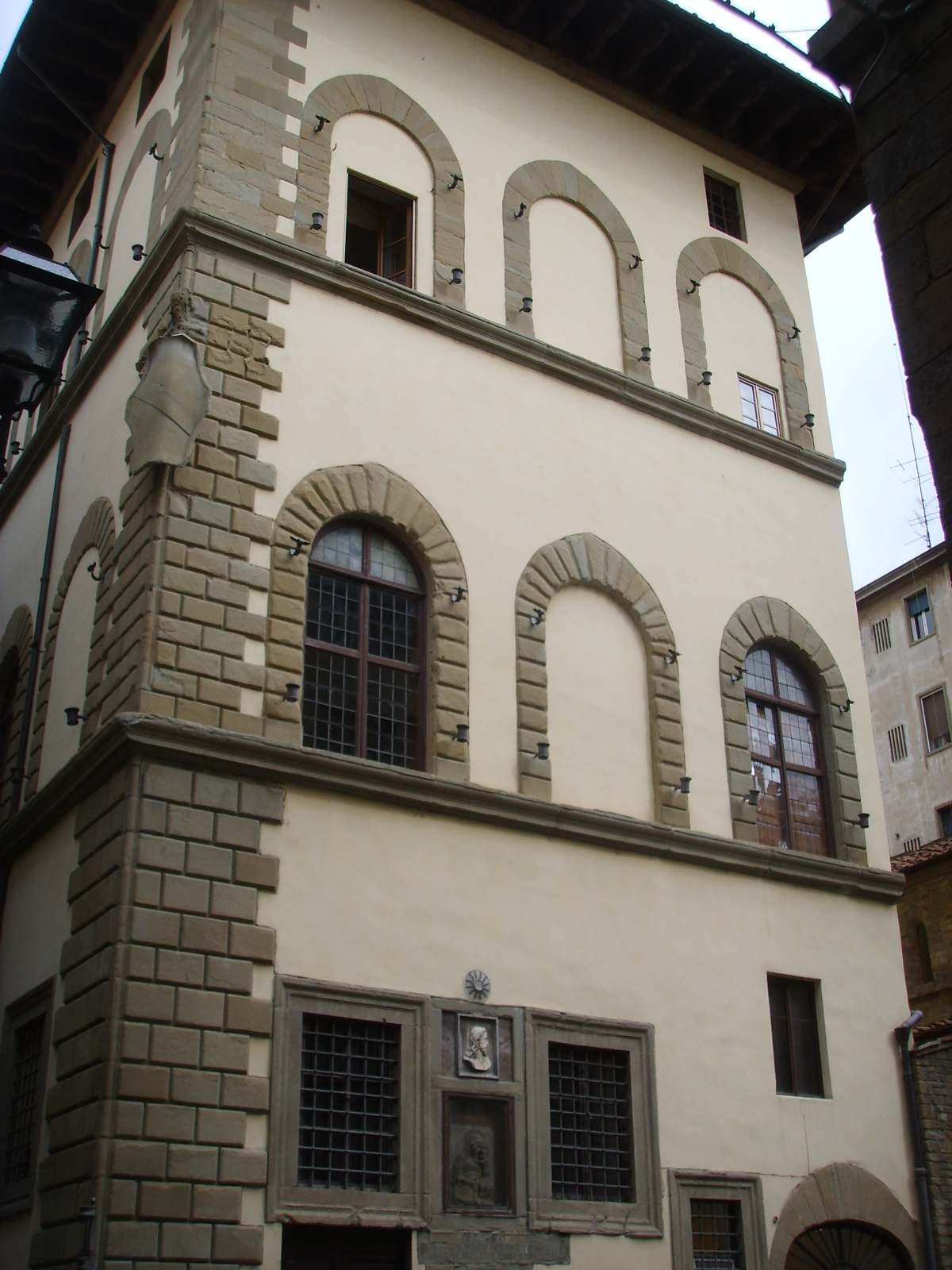
Palazzo Rosselli del Turco, by the architect Baccio d'Agnolo, in Borgo Santi Apostoli, Florence

The Rosselli Del Turco are an historic noble family from Florence, Italy. Their origins date to the union of the Rosselli family and the Del Turco family in 1727.

== History ==
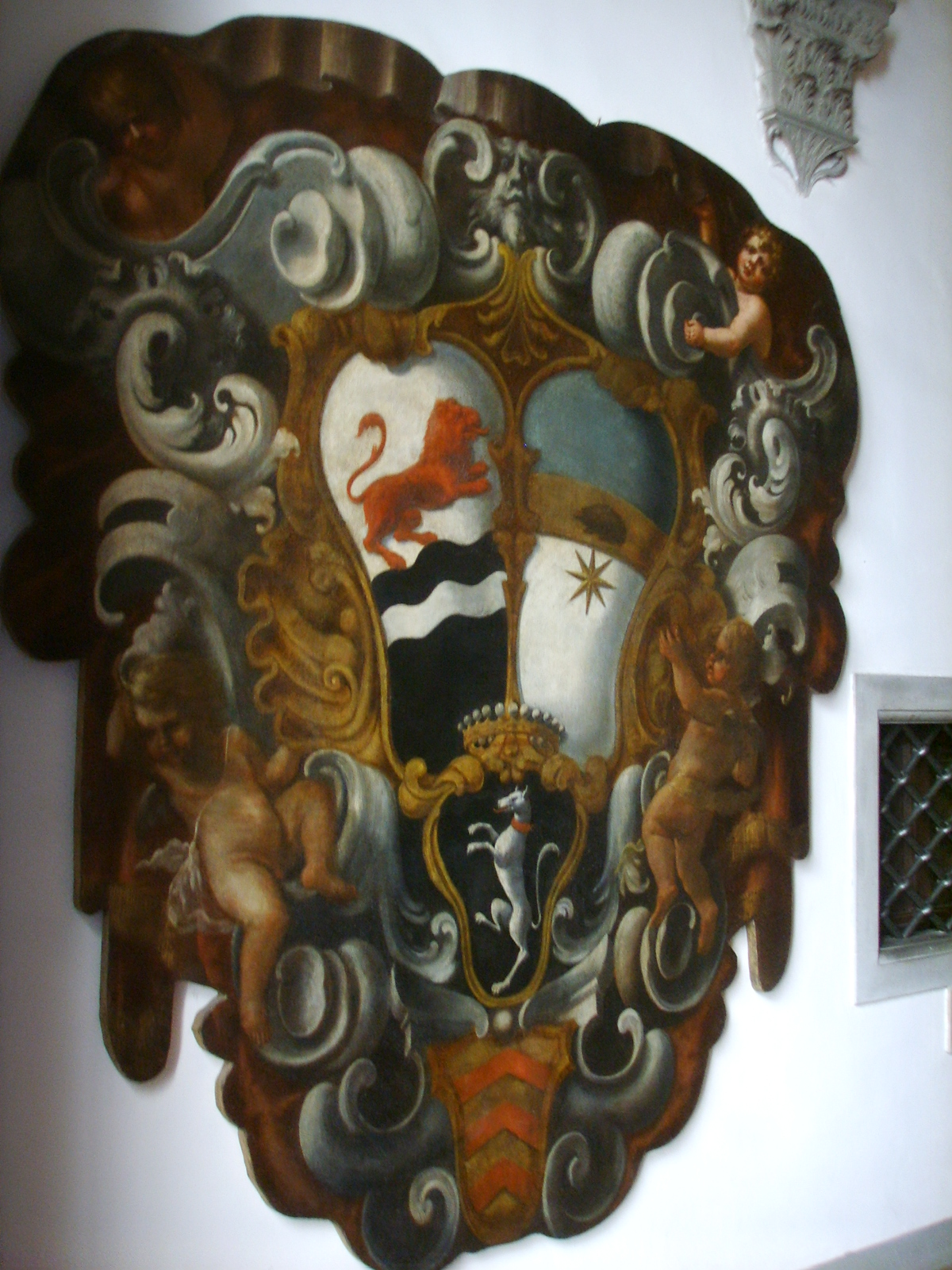
The combined family crest: Del Turco (prancing lion)

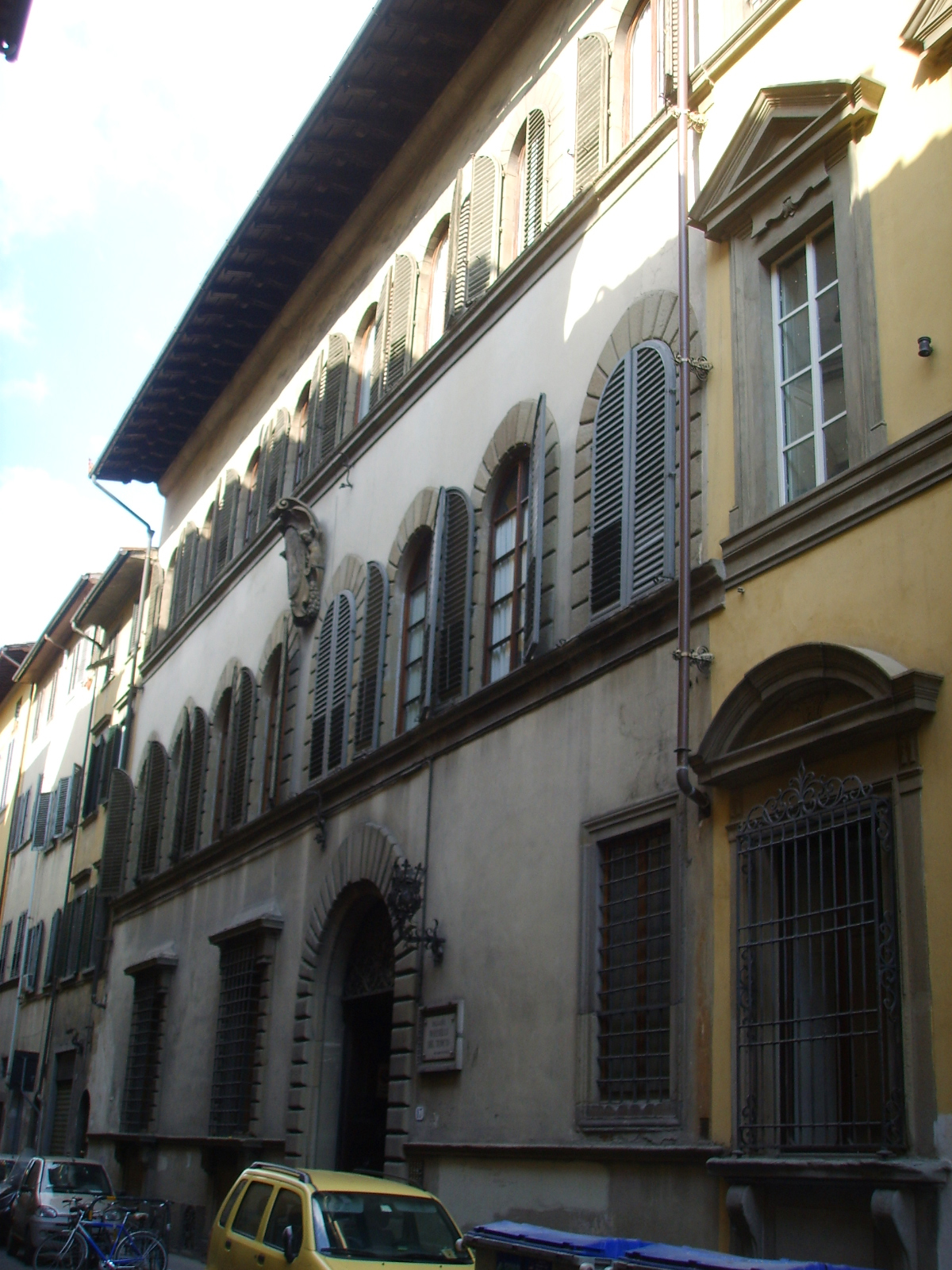
The palazzo on Via Serragli

The Rosselli family included some prominent painters starting in the 15th century. The best known was, perhaps, Cosimo Rosselli. Stefano Rosselli was an author of the Seicento when he wrote comedies and architectural documents such as the Sepultuario, dedicated to the Churches of Florence.

When Pellegrina di Stefano Rosselli became the last hereditary member, through her marriage to Chiarissimo Del Turco, she took the name of Rosselli del Turco uniting the two families since 1727. Since then, the family gained notable wealth and acquired significant properties such as Palazzo Borgherini in Borgo Santi Apostoli. Another family residence, the (Palazzo Rosselli del Turco) is located in Via dei Serragli, Florence.

In the 19th century the title of Marquis was conferred by Pope Leo XIII. The patron saint of the family is St. Aloysius Gonzaga.

The renowned 20th-century chess master, Stefano Rosselli del Turco, was a member of the family. The family continues to own holdings in the Mugello region and elsewhere.

== Family crest ==
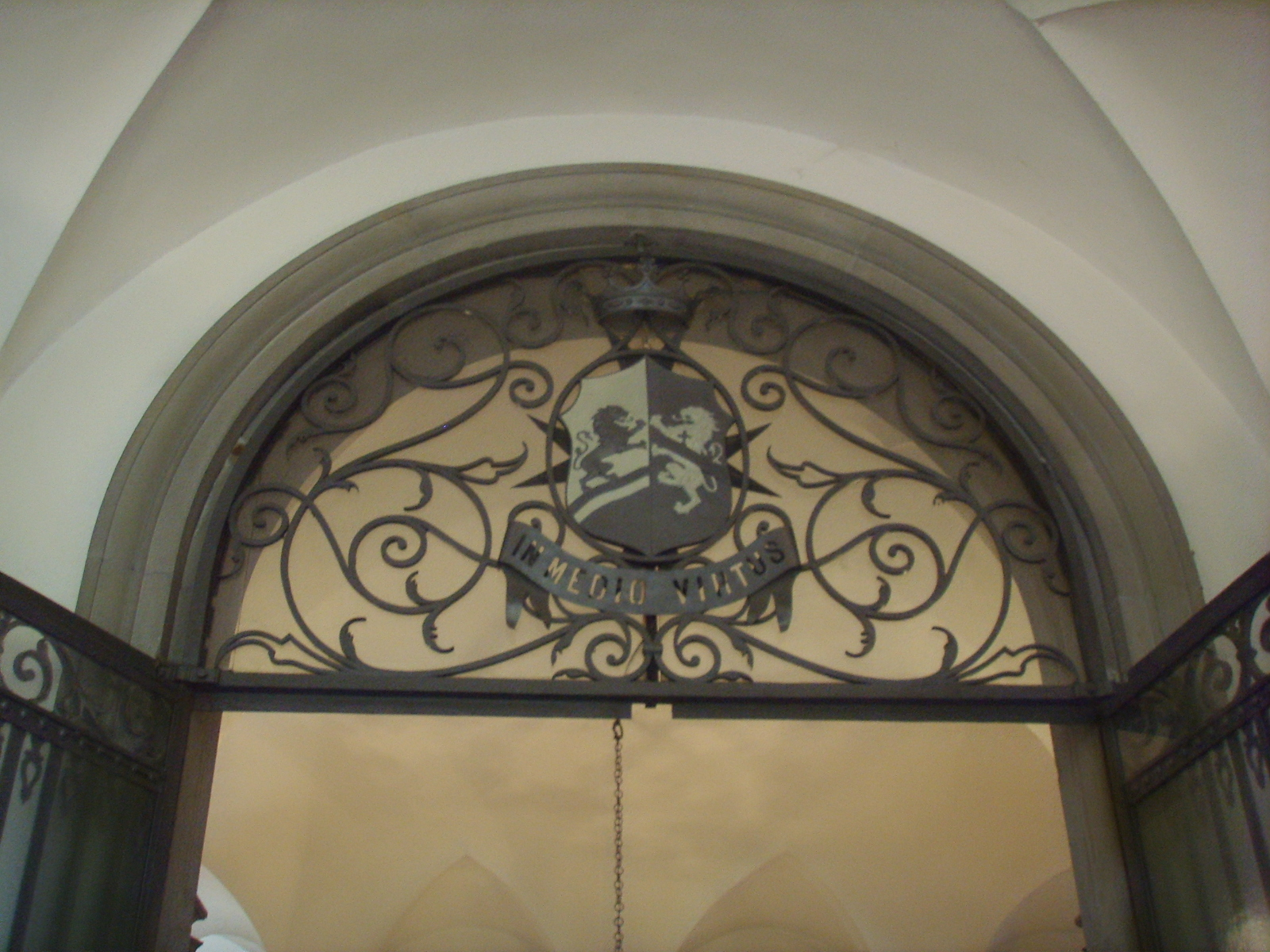
The crest with the two lions of the Rosselli del Turco, with the family motto in medio virtus, Palazzo Borgherini-Rosselli del Turco
