= Giulia Turco =

Giulia Turco, or Giulia Turco Lazzari (Italian pronunciation: [ˈdʒuːlja ˈturko]; 1848–1912), was a baroness best known as a naturalist and writer in her native Trento, Italy. She was married to the bolognese musician Raffaello Lazzari.

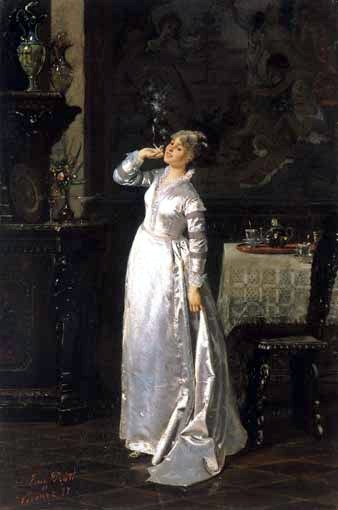
Portrait of Baronessa Giulia Turco Turcato Lazzari (1877)

In the 1850s she wrote for the magazine Rivista delle signorine, where she published a series of articles and short stories under the pseudonym "Jacopo Turco". Here she began a series of works which can be classified as lifestyle guides for young women and expounded the virtues of travel, charity, floral design, natural medicines and cooking.

Her cultural interests later brought her to support artists and musicians in both her native Trento and Venice, where she also had a home. Among these were the painter Eugenio Prati, a long-time friend, and for whom Turco's diary provides great insight. Another was the naturalist artist Bartolomeo Bezzi, whose "attachment to his native land is a constant aspect of his life and during his stays in Trentino he was a frequent visitor to the cultural circle of Baroness Giulia Turco Lazzari, in such company as Eugenio Prati, Luigi Nono, Angelo dall'Oca Bianca and many other artists, critics, writers and musicians".

By the end of the 19th century, her main focus was on gastronomy and she created a large recipe file and catalogue maintained between 1899 and 1901 with Pellegrino Artusi. In 1904 Artusi published a practical manual for the kitchen, with over 3,000 recipes and 150 tables, simply entitled Ecco il tuo libro di cucina (Here is your kitchen book). Turco's participation was anonymous and was only later revealed.
