= Palazzo Rosselli del Turco =

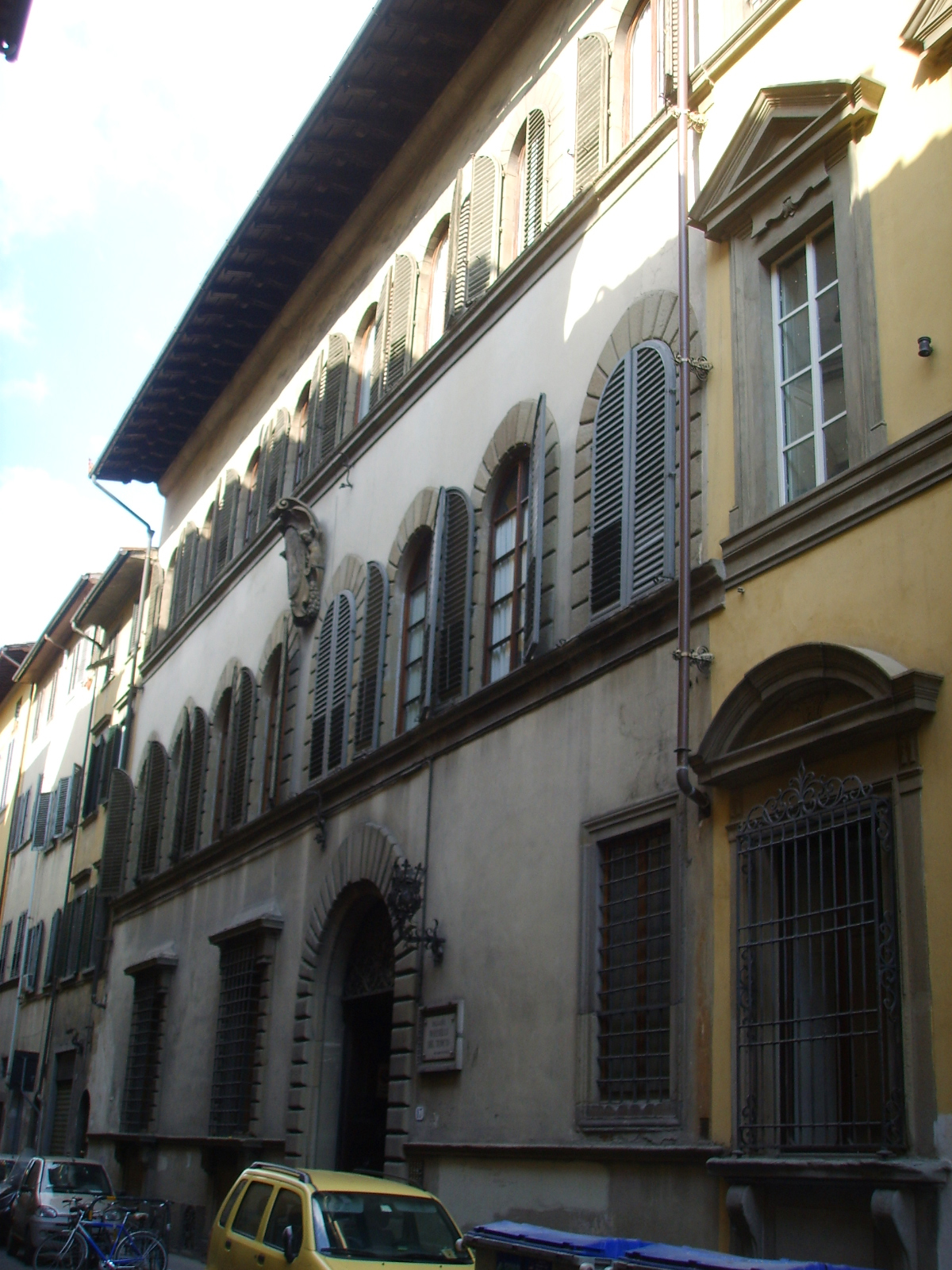
- Interactive map of the Palazzo Rosselli del Turco area

General information
- Location: via dei Serragli 17, Florence, Italy
- Coordinates: 43°46′04.78″N 11°14′46.35″E

Palazzo Rosselli Del Turco (Sassatelli branch) is located in via dei Serragli 17 in Florence, Italy.

== History and description ==
Designed in the typical florentine sober baroque style, an intonaco layer of plaster characterizes the building's facade. This layer brings out the elements made from pietra serena: the two rows of framed arched windows on the first and second floor, the marcapiano frame details, the rectangular windows on the ground floor, and the portal. https://www.informaticisenzafrontiere.org/ In the center of the building sits the noble coat of arms; however, it's not from the family line of Rosselli del Turco. The building was acquired in 1851 by Knight Luca Rosselli Del Turco (1826–1882) through marriage to Countess Vittoria Sassatelli di Imola, who was the last descendant of the principal branch of this historic house. Their descendants were then called "Rosselli del Turco Sassatelli." The Palazzo remained in their possession until 1922.

In the courtyard of the building, there's a well, a fountain, and some sculptural fragments. In one of the corridors leading to underground levels, there are 19th Century frescoes created in the medieval style.

From the second half of the 19th century to today, various artists held studios or exhibition spaces in the Palazzo. The painters William Page, Walter Gould, and Karl Stengel; and the sculptors Alexander Galt, Henry Kirke Brown, and Thomas Ridgeway Gould.

During the years that Florence was the capital of Italy (1865-1871), the US embassy resided in Palazzo Rosselli del Turco in Via de' Serragli. The Americans chose to use Palazzo Rosselli del Turco specifically because of this existing connection between this property and various North American intellectuals and artists.

== Other images ==
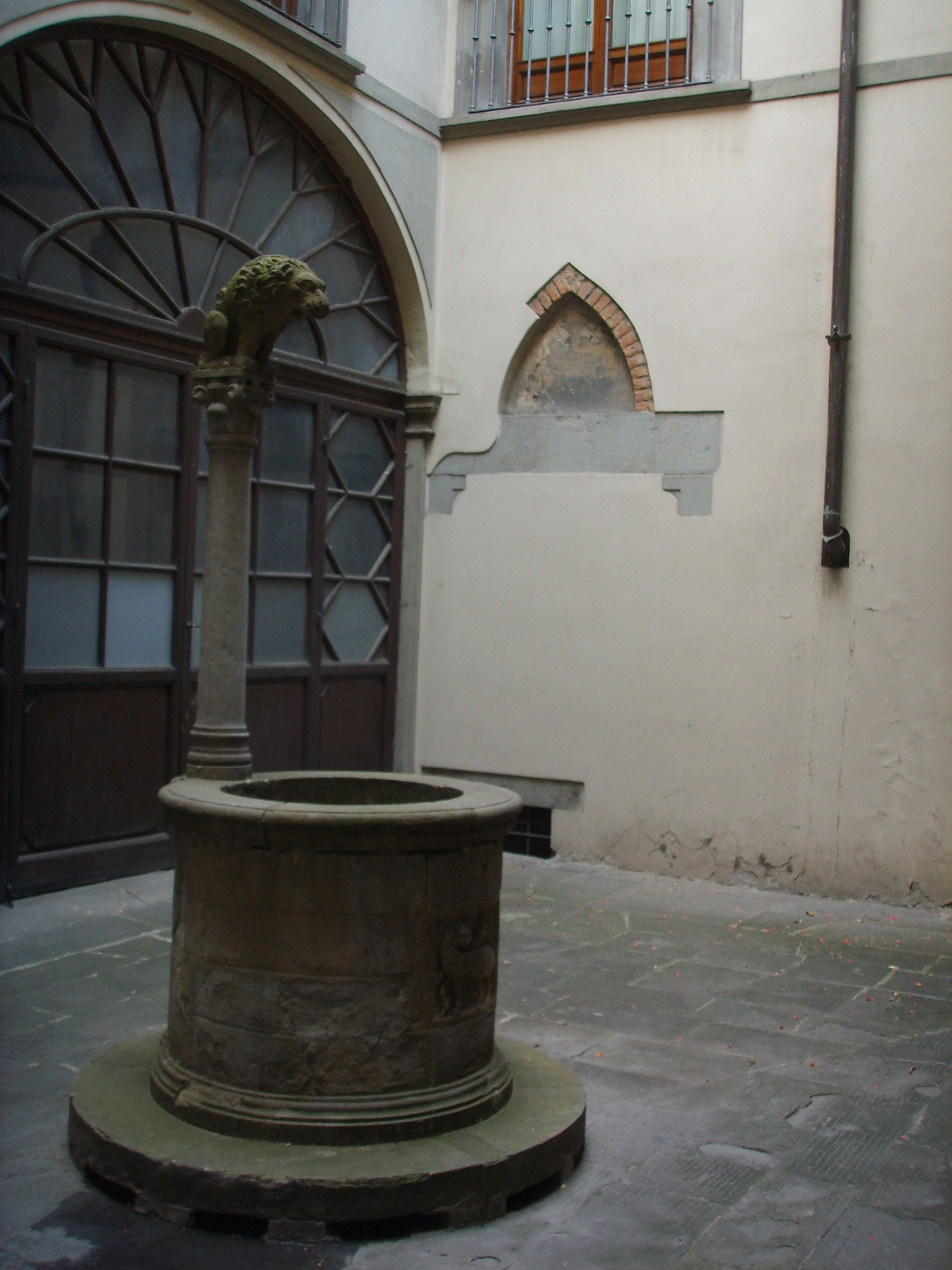
the courtyard, the well

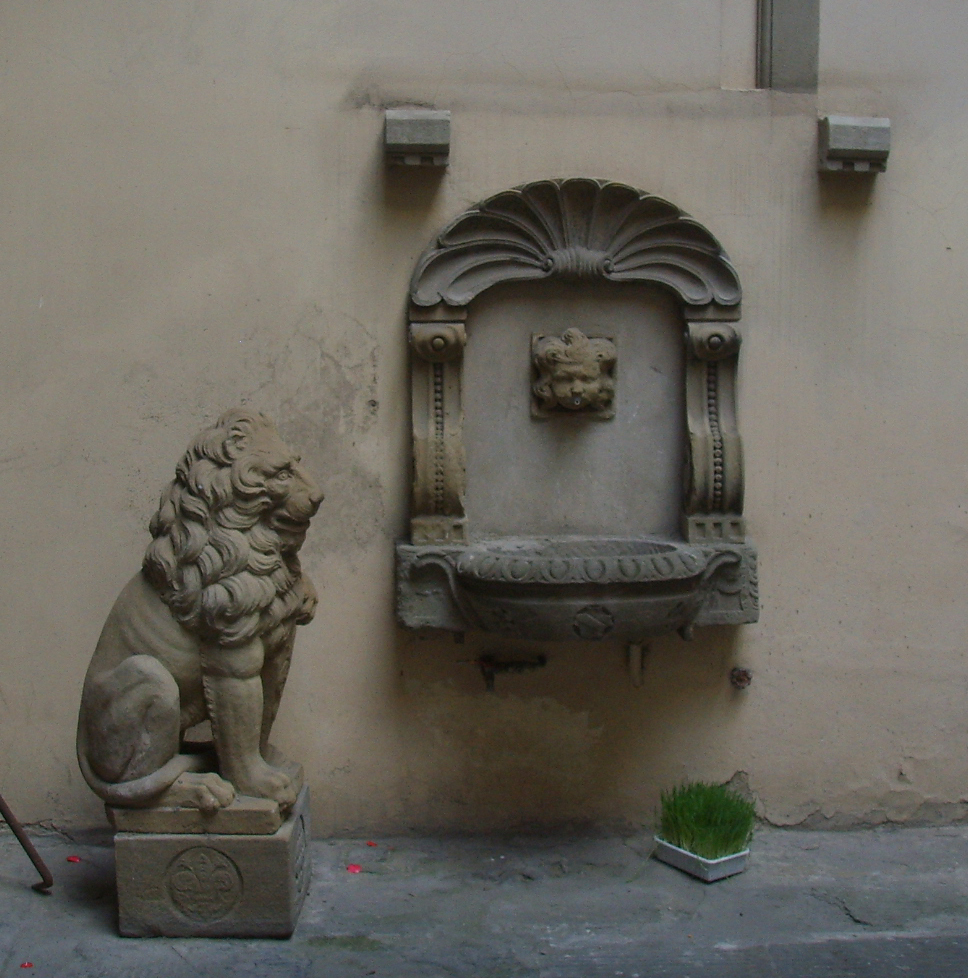
the courtyard, the fountain and the Marzocco

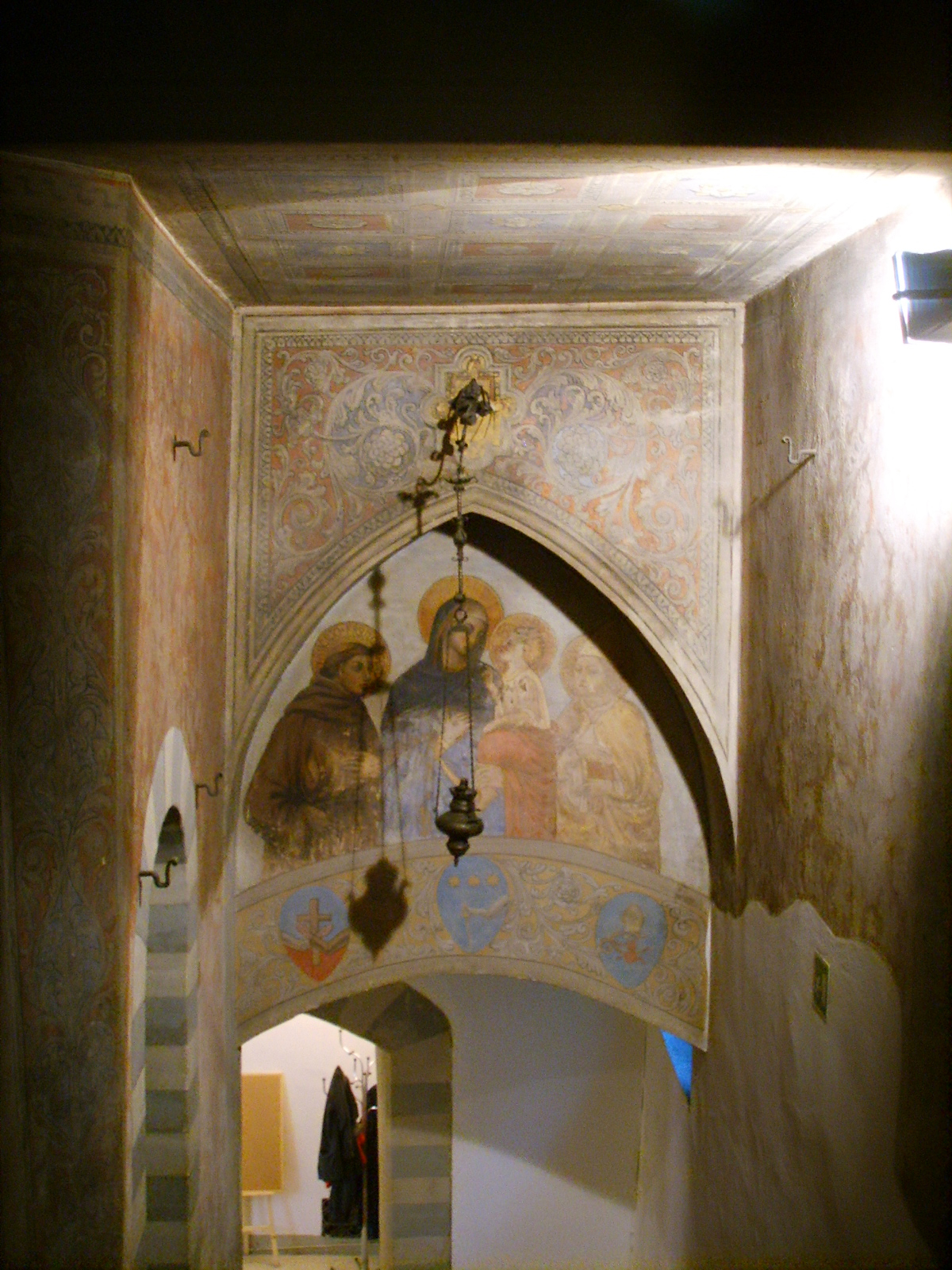
the frescoed corridor
