= Walter Gould =

American painter

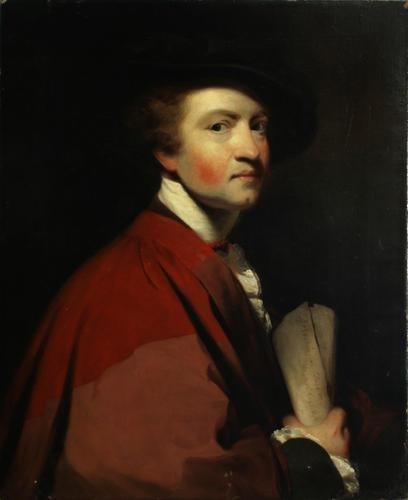
Self-portrait, in imitation of Joshua Reynolds (1849).

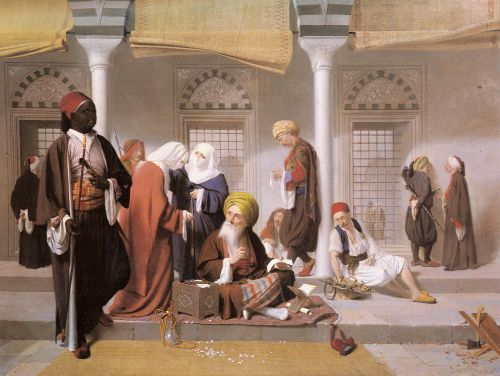
The Public Scribe.

Walter Gould (1829 in Philadelphia – 1893 in Florence) was an American painter; known for his Orientalist scenes. He also painted landscapes, portraits and still-lifes.

== Early life and education ==
At an early age, he began studying with the panorama painter, John Rowson Smith and the portrait painter, Thomas Sully. At the age of fourteen, he exhibited his first portrait and, the following year, exhibited with the Pennsylvania Academy of Fine Arts. He later worked in Virginia as well, although most of those works were lost during the American Civil War.

== Career ==
In 1849, he went to Europe and, after a brief stay in Paris, moved to Italy and settled in Florence. There, he met and befriended the sculptor, Hiram Powers and appears to have become a sort of uncle to his numerous children. In 1850, Powers entrusted him with the task of salvaging a statue of his that had been lost in a shipwreck: a task in which Gould was successful.

In 1851, Powers encouraged him to travel to Turkey for a possible portrait commission and provided him with the means. The commission involved Lajos Kossuth, who had fled there as a refugee and was living in Kütahya. With a letter of introduction provided by the British Ambassador, Sir Stratford Canning, he was able to meet Kossuth and paint his portrait. Judging from his letters to Powers, they also became close friends. While there, he visited Istanbul and created some of the Orientalist works for which he is best remembered, as well as portraits, including one of the Grand Vizier, Mustafa Reşid Pasha.

A brief visit to America was disappointing in terms of sales, and he returned to Florence. He would continue to paint some Orientalist genre scenes, in addition to many portraits; holding a major exhibit in 1866 at the National Academy of Design which was not, however, well-received by the critics. In his later years, a visit from his old friend, Moncure Conway, found him with dimming eyesight from painting too many portrait miniatures, and fond of talking about the past.

== Death and legacy ==
He died of paralysis, while recovering from a stroke. A year after his death, his relatives made a gift of some of his works to the Historical Society of Pennsylvania, but the great majority are in private collections. In many cases, their present locations are unknown.

== Sources ==
- Biographical notes @ Schwarz Gallery
- Biographical notes and commentary @ Sotheby's
- Biography in American Orientalists by Gerald M. Ackerman @ Google Books
