= Inco =

Canadian mining company (1902–2007)

- Traded as: NYSE: N TSX: N
- Founded: 29 March 1902 (New Jersey); 25 July 1916 (Canada)
- Defunct: 4 January 2007
- Fate: Acquired by Vale S.A.
- Successor: Vale Canada
- Headquarters: Toronto, Ontario

Inco Limited was an American-Canadian mining company that existed from 1902 to 2007. The company was founded as a New Jersey corporation in 1902 as the International Nickel Company by Robert Means Thompson and J. P. Morgan. In 1916, the company created a Canadian subsidiary, the International Nickel Company of Canada Limited, which in 1928 took over the American parent. In April 1976, International Nickel changed its name to Inco Limited.

Inco was one of Canada's largest corporations and one of the world's largest nickel producers. In late 2006 the company was acquired by Vale of Brazil, and in 2007 became Vale Canada.

== History ==
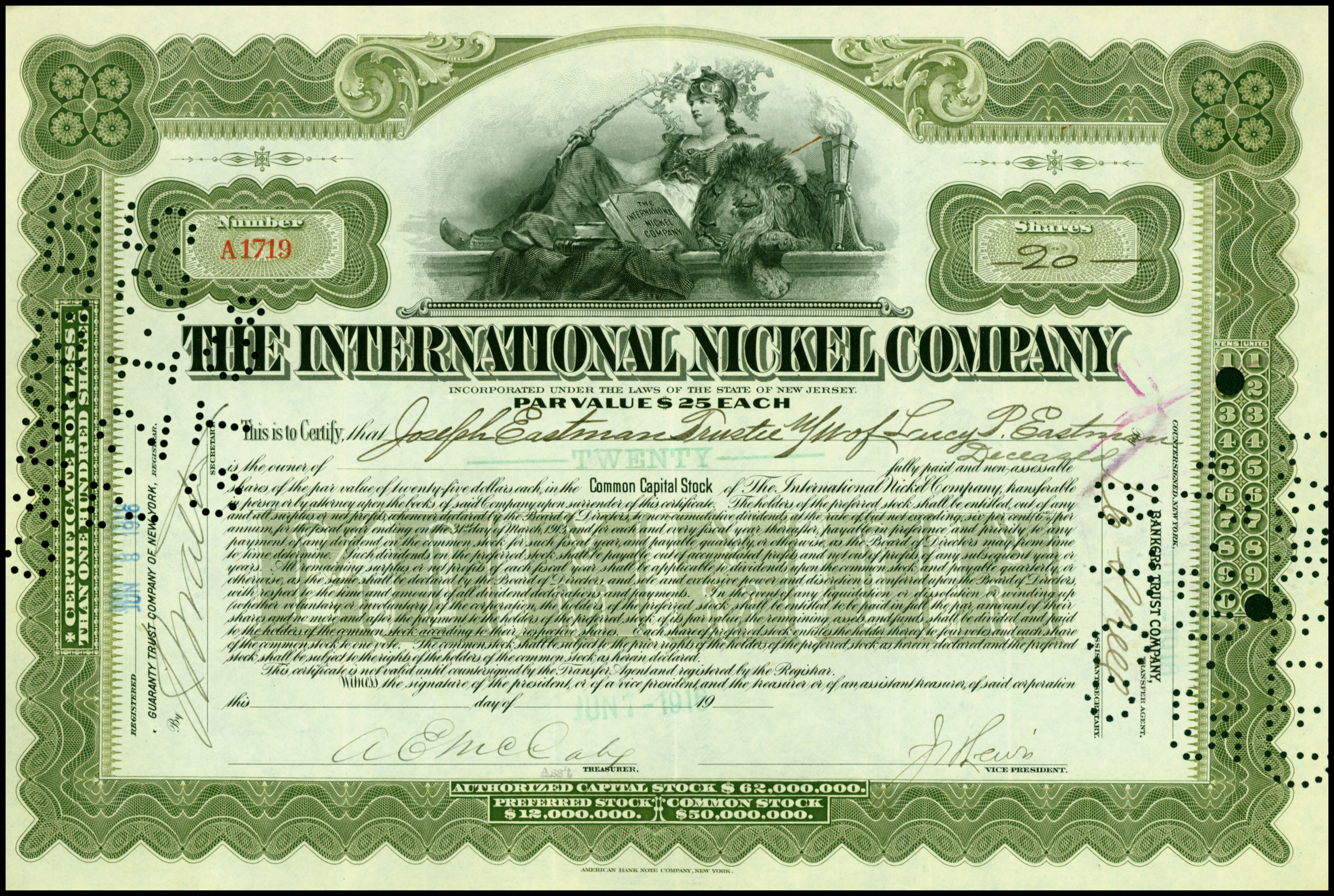
Share of the International Nickel Company, issued 7 June 1916

=== Founding of Inco ===
The company was founded following the discovery by blacksmith Tom Flanagan in Copper Cliff, Ontario of chalcopyrite deposits, while the Canadian Pacific Railway was being built in 1883; the township of Sudbury soon followed in 1884 when JL Morris, provincial land surveyor, laid it out. Initially, ore was shipped for smelting to a plant in Constable Hook, New Jersey, owned by the Orford Copper Company. Processing revealed in 1884 that the ore was also rich in nickel and exploration tests revealed an enormous potential. In 1893 Robert M. Thompson patented the Orford "Tops and Bottoms" process; this was the first commercially viable method of separating (Fe,Ni)_{9}S_{8} Pentlandite-borne Nickel from the CuFeS_{2} Chalcopyrite-borne Copper.

The Spanish-American War focused the eyes of the world on nickel steel, because in the Battle of Manila Bay and the Battle of Santiago de Cuba, the American losses were negligible while the Spanish losses were catastrophic. This was the result of the nickel steel used by the Americans to clad their hulls. The Spanish Navy had ignored to their peril the 1889 paper by James Riley, "Alloys of Nickel and Steel", and the market for nickel was made. The next year saw the introduction by Bethlehem Steel of a virtually indestructible nickel steel automobile axle.

Nickel mining started in Sudbury, Ontario in 1902, and that year, the International Nickel Company, Ltd. was created by Thompson and John Pierpont Morgan in New York, NY as a joint venture between Canadian Copper Company, Orford Copper Company, and American Nickel Works, with a capitalization of $28 million. In 1905, Monel alloy was discovered by Robert Crooks Stanley (1876-1951) and named for Inco President Ambrose Monell. Meanwhile, the development of austenitic stainless steel was launched by a pair of Krupp engineers known today as AISI Type 304 or simply 18/8, which indicates a nickel content of 8%. This novelty would assure the 20th-century success of the firm.

In 1916, the International Nickel Company of Canada, Ltd. was incorporated in Copper Cliff in Sudbury; this entity was a subsidiary of New York-based Inco. The company built a new refinery in Port Colborne in 1918 and during the following year, the company first began using the trade name Inco.

During the 1919 Ontario general election, The Toronto World pursued a simmering scandal from 1916 concerning Inco and alleged provincial support of wartime shipments of the metal to Germany via the cargo submarine Deutschland.

On 31 October 1928 the Canadian body corporate and its American parent switched roles and the Canadian became the parent. On 1 January 1929 the corporation acquired the British-owned Mond Nickel Company in exchange for treasury shares, to solve the Frood Mine problem. By 1931, Stanley had progressed to President of the firm. Between 1935 and 1939, sales exceeded 200 million pounds annually, which was more than 80% of world consumption. A significant proportion of these sales found their way to the United States, with other notable markets including the Soviet Union, Great Britain, Japan, and Germany. Approximately 9 percent of company's total sales from 1934 to 1939 were to Nazi Germany, mainly to meet the growing demand of the country's armaments industry.

=== Head office to Toronto ===
When Robert Crooks Stanley became president of INCO in 1922, priority was given to high quality research. A head office for the Canadian operations of Inco was soon established in Toronto. In 1922 Stanley closed the Bayonne NJ refinery in favour of the new electrolytic one in Port Colborne, Ontario, while at Alfred Mond's nickel carbonyl refinery in Acton, London Inco was able to produce platinum. As early as 1930, Canadian Industries Limited (CIL) had a sulfuric acid plant located in Copper Cliff; its product, which came in synergy with the smelter there, was used in CIL's Nobel, Ontario gunpowder factory.

Stanley's excellent contribution to Inco was his devotion to alloy research, which contributed to the expansion of the market for the base metals it produced. In his first Annual Report in 1922 after becoming President, Stanley informed the shareowners of the new Development and Research Department. At the same time, management told the directors that "we had no market developed [for Monel] which would justify a mill, but we assured them that with a mill we could build a market which would earn the preferred dividend." The directors thereupon invested three quarters of all the liquid resources of the company into the Huntington WV plant to satisfy a market which management had just said did not exist. The Monel alloy family grew into more than a dozen members, and Duranickel, Permanickel, Ni-span-C, Inconel X and Nimonic were all discovered under his watch, most at his Huntington Works baby.

JL Agnew originated the Geology Department of the firm, as a result of his investigations into the Frood Mine problem, which precipitated the 1929 merger with the Mond Company. This department was instrumental in the Manitoba discovery 25 years after his death.

On 1 April 1929 the Ontario Refining Company (ORC) was formed in a joint venture between the American Metal Company, the Consolidated Mining and Smelting Company, Inco and Ventures Limited (which was the parent of Falconbridge Limited). The first and third named companies had each a 42% share. By June 1935 the ORC, which worked at the electrolysis of copper, was a wholly owned subsidiary of Inco. The Inco Triangle, a monthly newsletter for the company, had its first issue of eight pages in September 1936.

During World War II, Inco's Frood Mine produced 40% of the nickel used in artillery by the Allies. From 1939 to 1945, Inco delivered to the Allies 1.5 billion pounds of nickel. During the war it almost doubled its yearly output of ore. After the war, demand for nickel remained high because of the Korean War and the Cold War of the 1950s.

Because of the Mond merger, Inco had ownership of nickel properties in Petsamo Province, Finland (now known as Pechengsky District) and had invested a fair sum in them. These properties were conquered by the Soviet Union after the Continuation War of 1941-44. As a result, reparations needed to be negotiated between Inco and the Soviet Union, through the Canadian government after 1944. The parties settled for $20 million, which was paid with difficulty.

Also because of the Mond merger Inco was the owner of the Nimonic technology that allowed gas turbines and jet propulsion engines to function. This research was performed during 1940 at the request of the Air Ministry of the British government for materials that would withstand the elevated temperatures seen in these applications.

Also during World War 2 was developed ductile iron, by Keith Millis, Albert Gagnebin and Norman Boden Pilling. The scientists were curious to replace chromium as an alloy agent in abrasion-resistant cast iron and they stumbled upon the amazing ductile property of magnesium-treated iron, which transforms carbon flakes into spheroids and thus ductilizes the whole.

In 1948 Sproule and Harcourt patented (U.S. patent 2,419,973 and U.S. patent 2,425,760) a new development of the Orford process, in which careful cooling of the matte enabled the precipitation of a small amount of nickel-copper alloy which contains platinum group metals besides. This is crushed, finely ground and treated by flotation and magnetic separation to part the constituents. This work was the culmination of experiments begun in Copper Cliff by Roy Gordon in March 1938 and was one of the reasons why his career ascent was so meteoric.

In its heyday during the 1950s, Inco produced 85% of the world's nickel supply. In 1956, geologists discovered the Thompson, Manitoba ore body and named it for Inco Chairman John Fairfield Thompson. The first Canadian-born President of Inco, who held the office between 1960 and 1966, was named James Roycroft Gordon.

The year 1969 saw a bloody four-month long strike at Inco's Sudbury operations, and the firm's share price was cut in half.

In 1972, it was decided by Chairman L. Edward Grubb, ostensibly to pacify the labour unions, to move the head office from New York to Toronto where it resided in the Toronto Dominion Centre. Also in 1972 the Inco Superstack was built in Sudbury; at the time senior technical staff like Paul Queneau thought this would solve the SO2 acid rain pollution problem. And in 1972, the Sorowako project in Indonesia was begun together with involvement from six Japanese firms who together held a 40% share in the project.

In July 1974, Chairman L. Edward Grubb decided to diversify Inco's holdings and make the first ever hostile takeover bid for Philadelphia-based Electric Storage Battery Company (ESB), aided by Morgan Stanley. United Aircraft Corporation entered as white knight and served to increase Grubb's bid to a 110 percent premium above the pretakeover price. The merger was characterized as a "major blunder" and by December 1981 Inco was looking to exit the battery business. In February 1983 Inco sold most of its holdings in Exide and exited the battery business. ESB manufactured amongst other products the Ray-O-Vac battery.

The 1975 Inco annual report had a picture of a supersonic Concorde jet which used nickel and titanium alloy blades forged by Daniel Doncaster and Sons, a 1975 acquisition of Inco (Alloy Products) division. A picture of Prince Charles talking with a Doncaster operator of electronic blade inspection equipment lies alongside it. In 1976, the company's name was officially changed to Inco Limited.

Inco also built and operated a facility that included a research center overlooking Blue Lake in New York's Sterling Forest area. That site was sold in the 1980s.

=== Downturn ===
During the first half of the 1980s Inco bled a lot of red ink, "which caused the elimination during the five years from 1980 of more than 12,000 jobs worldwide, or 35 percent of its work force, including more than 6,000 jobs in Canada." It then produced one-third of the world's nickel. Charles F. Baird was the chairman and CEO. The downturn caused a new business model to emerge from the periodic contract negotiations between Ontario division management and the United Steelworkers of Canada: the "nickel bonus" was negotiated in return for surrendering annual wage increases. As a union-friendly publication writes: "Under its terms, when nickel prices are high, miners share in the increased profits. During down years in the notoriously cyclical minerals market, no bonuses are earned."

By 1985 Inco (Alloy Products) division included: Doncasters Blaenavon Ltd Special Alloy Products Division, Doncasters Monk Bridge Ltd, Doncasters Sheffield Ltd, Doncasters Moorside Ltd, Beaufort Engineering Ltd, Whittingham and Porter Ltd, I.A.P.L. Technology Centre and Inco Selective Surfaces Ltd.

The SO2 abatement project (SOAP) instigated a $600 million clean-sheet recomposition of the smelter plant that allowed INCO to capture 90% of their emissions, and commercialize sulfuric acid.

In the 1993 cyclical downturn in the mining industry, INCO's Sudbury management decided that instead of culling office employees with a pink slip, the workforce including a large number of women would be offered a job in production as a miner. Until this time the mines were a wholly male dominated workplace. The first crop of transitioned miners numbered 16 of 86 offers, and included five women.

In late 1994, Diamond Field Resources discovered nickel, copper and cobalt ore bodies at Voisey's Bay Mine (VBM) in Labrador, Canada. The deposit was estimated to contain 141 million tonnes at 1.6% nickel and was imagined by the then-chieftains of Inco as a 21st-century replacement for the waning Copper Cliff resource. In 1996, the VBM was purchased by Inco for 4.3 billion Canadian dollars. Some say that Inco overpaid for VBM because of the presence of Falconbridge at the auction.

In order to generate cash Inco sold its manufacturing sites of nickel alloys to Special Metals Corporation in 1998 for US$408 million. In the previous year, the division had generated US$668 million in revenue. Special Metals Corporation however filed Chapter 11 in March 2002.

In February 2001, nine-year CEO Michael Sopko stepped down while he announced a $400 million profit. He was replaced by New York lawyer Scott Hand.

In 2002, the VBM purchase was regarded as a "costly blunder... when the company had to write down a third of the value of the $4-billion acquisition only six years after the purchase," but in early 2004 that did not prevent Hand from making a bid for Noranda and Falconbridge, both of which were at the time owned by Brascan, who then declined the Inco offer. The bait in the water attracted Mick Davis and Roger Agnelli. Hand was not deterred from his takeover madness and went to Australia to try his luck in the Western Mining sweepstakes, where he was outbid by XStrata's offer of US$5.7 billion and the ultimately successful BHP Billiton bid of $7.3 billion. Not last in the waters was Teck Cominco's Don Lindsay, a product of CIBC World Markets and who had advised Falconbridge in their failed acquisition of VBM.

== Leadership ==
=== President ===
1. Ambrose Monell, 1902–1917
2. William Arthur Bostwick, 1917–1922
3. Robert Crooks Stanley, 1922–1949
4. Dr John Fairfield Thompson, 1949–1952
5. Dr Paul Dyer Merica, 1952–1954
6. Henry Smith Wingate, 1954–1960
7. James Roycroft Gordon, 1960–1966
8. Albert Paul Gagnebin, 1966–1972
9. Louis Edward Grubb, 1972–1974
10. Joseph Edwin Carter, 1974–1977
11. Charles Fitz Baird, 1977–1980
12. Donald John Phillips, 1980–1991
13. Dr Michael D. Sopko, 1991
14. Scott McKee Hand, 1991–2001
15. Peter Clark Jones, 2001–2007

=== Chairman of the Board ===
1. Robert Means Thompson, 1902–1916
2. Edmund Cogswell Converse, 1916–1922
3. Charles Hayden, 1922–1937
4. Robert Crooks Stanley, 1937–1951
5. Dr John Fairfield Thompson, 1951–1960
6. Henry Smith Wingate, 1960–1972
7. Albert Paul Gagnebin, 1972–1974
8. Louis Edward Grubb, 1974–1977
9. Joseph Edwin Carter, 1977–1980
10. Charles Fitz Baird, 1980–1987
11. Donald John Phillips, 1987–1991
12. Dr Michael D. Sopko, 1991–2003
13. Scott McKee Hand, 2003–2007

== Company histories ==
- Brasch, Hans. A Miner's Chronicle: Inco Ltd. and the Unions, 1944–1997. United Steelworkers of America, 1997.
- Dennie, Donald. À l'ombre de l'INCO: Étude de la transition d'une communauté canadienne-française de la région de Sudbury (1890-1972). Les Presses de l'Université d'Ottawa, 2001.
- Fraser, Hugh S. A Journey North: The Great Thompson Nickel Discovery. Inco Limited, 1985.
- Goldie, Raymond. Inco Comes to Labrador. Flanker Press, 2005.
- International Nickel Company. The Romance of Nickel. International Nickel Company Inc., 1955.
- Leighton, Tony. Inco: 100 Years Strong, Celebrating Our Human Spirit. Inco Limited, 2002.
- Lowe, Mark. Premature Bonanza: Standoff at Voysey's Bay. Between the Lines, 1998.
- McNish, Jacquie. The Big Score: Robert Friedland, Inco, and the Voysey's Bay Hustle. Doubleday Canada, 1998.
- Swift, Jamie. The Big Nickel: Inco at Home and Abroad. Between the Lines, 1977.
- Thompson, John F. and Norman Beasley. For the Years to Come: A Story of International Nickel of Canada. G. P. Putnam's Sons, 1960.

== See also ==
- 1978 Inco strike
- Inco Superstack
