= Monell =

Monell may refer to:

- Monell (surname), a surname
- Monell Chemical Senses Center, an independent, non-profit scientific research institute located at the University City Science Center campus in Philadelphia
- Monell v. Department of Social Services, opinion given by the United States Supreme Court

== See also ==
- Monella (disambiguation)
- Monelli
