= Little Falls, New Jersey =

Township in Passaic County, New Jersey, US

- Township
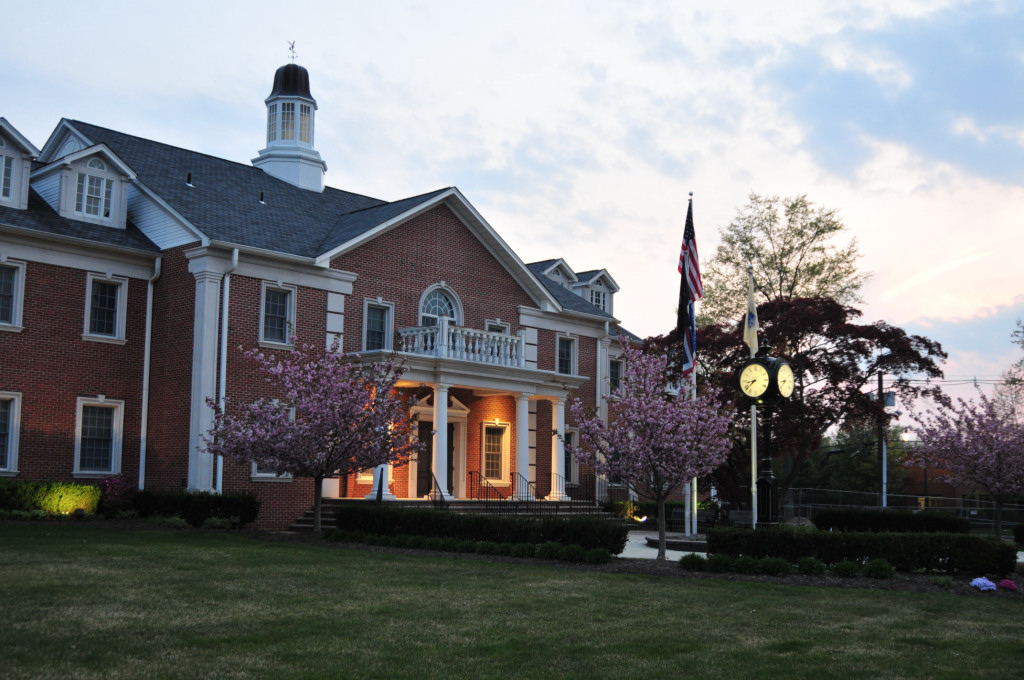
- Little Falls Town Hall

- Seal

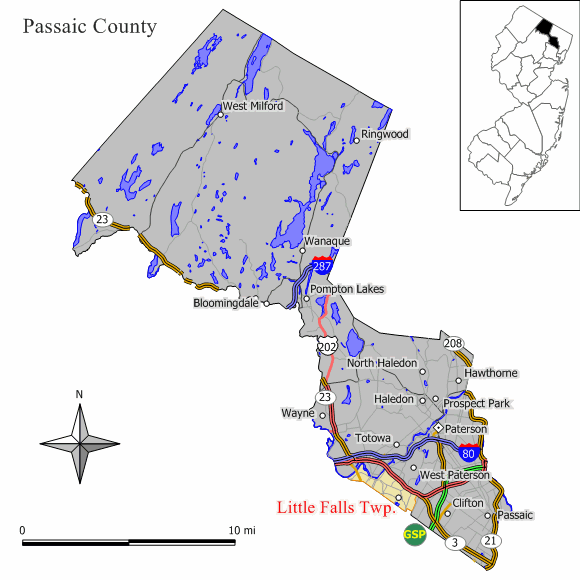
- Location of Little Falls in Passaic County highlighted in yellow (left). Inset map: Location of Passaic County in New Jersey highlighted in black (right).

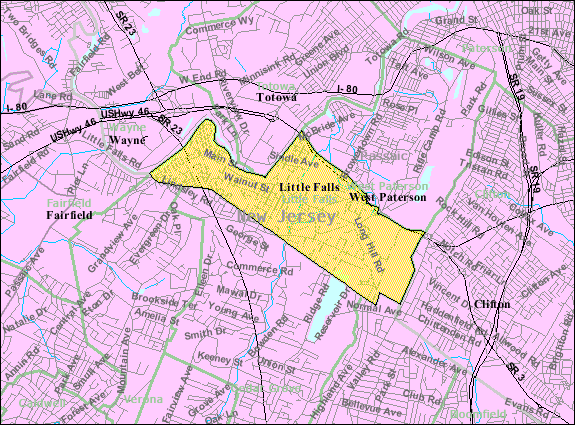
- Census Bureau map of Little Falls, New Jersey

- Location in Passaic County Location in New Jersey Location in the United States
- Coordinates: 40.87559°N 74.217366°W
- Country: United States
- State: New Jersey
- County: Passaic
- Incorporated: April 2, 1868

Government
  - Type: Faulkner Act (mayor–council)
  - Body: Township Council
  - Mayor: James Belford Damiano (D, term ends December 31, 2028)
  - Administrator: Charles Cuccia
  - Municipal clerk: Cynthia Kraus

Area
  - Total: 2.87 sq mi (7.43 km^{2})
  - Land: 2.80 sq mi (7.24 km^{2})
  - Water: 0.073 sq mi (0.19 km^{2}) 2.54%
  - Rank: 345th of 565 in state 14th of 16 in county
- Elevation: 157 ft (48 m)

Population (2020)
  - Total: 13,360
  - Estimate (2024): 15,099
  - Rank: 193rd of 565 in state 8th of 16 in county
  - Density: 4,780/sq mi (1,850/km^{2})
  - Rank: 120th of 565 in state 7th of 16 in county

Economics
  - Median income: $119,196 (± $15,166) (2018-2022)
- Time zone: UTC−05:00 (Eastern (EST))
  - Summer (DST): UTC−04:00 (Eastern (EDT))
- ZIP Code: 07424
- Area code: 973
- FIPS code: 3403140620
- GNIS feature ID: 0882313
- Website: littlefallsnj.gov

Little Falls is a township in Passaic County, in the U.S. state of New Jersey. The township was named after a waterfall on the Passaic River at a dam near Beattie Mill. As of the 2020 United States census, the township's population was 13,360, a decrease of 1,072 (−7.4%) from the 2010 census count of 14,432, which in turn reflected an increase of 3,577 (+33.0%) from the 10,855 counted in the 2000 census.

== History ==
Little Falls traces its first European settlement to 1711, when seven Bergen Dutch settlers banded together to begin farming. The Speer Homestead dates from c. 1785 (and may have originally been built in 1680).

The Morris Canal, once an important artery of trade and transportation until 1925 between the Delaware and Hudson rivers, wound its way through the township, and vestiges of it still remain today, some parts of which form a greenway.

Little Falls was incorporated as a township by an act of the New Jersey Legislature on April 2, 1868, from portions of Acquackanonk Township. On March 25, 1914, portions of the township were taken to form the borough of West Paterson (now Woodland Park).

== Geography ==
According to the United States Census Bureau, the township had a total area of 2.87 square miles (7.43 km^{2}), including 2.80 square miles (7.24 km^{2}) of land and 0.07 square miles (0.19 km^{2}) of water (2.54%).

Great Notch (with a 2020 Census population of 3,289) and Singac (3,602) are unincorporated communities and census-designated places (CDP) located within Little Falls Township.

The township has three main sub-divisions. Great Notch is the easternmost part of Little Falls. The downtown area is frequently referred to as "The Center of Town", mainly by longtime residents, and is usually referred to as simply Little Falls. Singac is in the westernmost portion of the township. Much of Singac borders the Passaic River.

Little Falls is bordered by the municipalities of Clifton, Totowa, Wayne, and Woodland Park in Passaic County, and Cedar Grove, Fairfield, Montclair, and North Caldwell in Essex County. It is located about 20 miles (32 km) west of New York City.

As of 2026, the township is a member of Local Leaders for Responsible Planning in order to address the township's Mount Laurel doctrine-based housing obligations.

== Demographics ==
Historical population
Census	Pop.	Note	%±
1870	1,282		—
1880	1,404		9.5%
1890	1,890		34.6%
1900	2,908		53.9%
1910	3,750		29.0%
1920	5,161	*	37.6%
1930	5,161		0.0%
1940	5,368		4.0%
1950	6,405		19.3%
1960	9,730		51.9%
1970	11,727		20.5%
1980	11,496		−2.0%
1990	11,294		−1.8%
2000	10,855		−3.9%
2010	14,432		33.0%
2020	13,360		−7.4%
2024 (est.)	15,099		13.0%
Population sources: 1870–1920; 1870 1880–1890; 1890–1910 1910–1930; 1940–2000 2000; 2010 2020 * = Lost territory in previous decade.

=== 2020 census ===
Little Falls township, Passaic County, New Jersey – Racial and Ethnic Composition (NH = Non-Hispanic) Note: the US Census treats Hispanic/Latino as an ethnic category. This table excludes Latinos from the racial categories and assigns them to a separate category. Hispanics/Latinos may be of any race.
Race / Ethnicity	Pop 2010	Pop 2020	% 2010	% 2020
White alone (NH)	11,530	9,116	79.89%	68.23%
Black or African American alone (NH)	549	834	3.80%	6.24%
Native American or Alaska Native alone (NH)	13	4	0.09%	0.03%
Asian alone (NH)	652	723	4.52%	5.41%
Pacific Islander alone (NH)	1	2	0.01%	0.01%
Some Other Race alone (NH)	34	68	0.24%	0.51%
Mixed Race/Multi-Racial (NH)	225	349	1.56%	2.61%
Hispanic or Latino (any race)	1,428	2,264	9.89%	16.95%
Total	14,432	13,360	100.00%	100.00%

=== 2010 census ===
The 2010 United States census counted 14,432 people, 4,740 households, and 2,825 families in the township. The population density was 5,276.2 per square mile (2,037.2/km^{2}). There were 4,925 housing units at an average density of 1,800.5 per square mile (695.2/km^{2}). The racial makeup was 86.68% (12,510) White, 4.11% (593) Black or African American, 0.15% (22) Native American, 4.56% (658) Asian, 0.01% (1) Pacific Islander, 2.38% (344) from other races, and 2.11% (304) from two or more races. Hispanic or Latino of any race were 9.89% (1,428) of the population.

Of the 4,740 households, 22.8% had children under the age of 18; 45.8% were married couples living together; 10.2% had a female householder with no husband present and 40.4% were non-families. Of all households, 33.1% were made up of individuals and 12.6% had someone living alone who was 65 years of age or older. The average household size was 2.36 and the average family size was 3.04.

13.7% of the population were under the age of 18, 29.4% from 18 to 24, 21.0% from 25 to 44, 22.8% from 45 to 64, and 13.0% who were 65 years of age or older. The median age was 32.1 years. For every 100 females, the population had 81.9 males. For every 100 females ages 18 and older there were 78.2 males.

The Census Bureau's 2006–2010 American Community Survey showed that (in 2010 inflation-adjusted dollars) median household income was $78,318 (with a margin of error of +/− $8,244) and the median family income was $92,462 (+/− $12,925). Males had a median income of $67,585 (+/− $7,860) versus $42,270 (+/− $3,385) for females. The per capita income for the borough was $34,505 (+/− $3,336). About 4.7% of families and 6.0% of the population were below the poverty line, including 8.1% of those under age 18 and 10.2% of those age 65 or over.

Same-sex couples headed 42 households in 2010, an increase from the 33 counted in 2000.

=== 2000 census ===
As of the 2000 United States census there were 10,855 people, 4,687 households, and 2,873 families residing in the township. The population density was 3,941.8 inhabitants per square mile (1,521.9/km^{2}). There were 4,797 housing units at an average density of 1,742.0 per square mile (672.6/km^{2}). The racial makeup of the township was 92.13% white, 0.65% African American, 0.06% Native American, 4.20% Asian, 0.02% Pacific Islander, 1.33% from other races, and 1.60% from two or more races. Hispanic or Latino of any race were 5.33% of the population.

There were 4,687 households, out of which 22.9% had children under the age of 18 living with them, 49.1% were married couples living together, 9.4% had a female householder with no husband present, and 38.7% were non-families. 33.1% of all households were made up of individuals, and 13.3% had someone living alone who was 65 years of age or older. The average household size was 2.32 and the average family size was 2.99.

In the township, the population was spread out, with 18.1% under the age of 18, 6.6% from 18 to 24, 32.4% from 25 to 44, 24.9% from 45 to 64, and 17.9% who were 65 years of age or older. The median age was 41 years. For every 100 females, there were 89.7 males. For every 100 females age 18 and over, there were 87.4 males.

The median income for a household in the township was $58,857, and the median income for a family was $70,223. Males had a median income of $49,136 versus $37,727 for females. The per capita income for the township was $33,242. About 2.8% of families and 4.6% of the population were below the poverty line, including 4.8% of those under age 18 and 4.9% of those age 65 or over.

== Economy ==
Mountain View Diners Company operated from 1939 to 1957, manufacturing a total of 400 prefabricated diners that were shipped nationwide.

== Points of interest ==
Little Falls Old Town Hall

The Little Falls Old Town Hall on Stevens Avenue was added to the National Register of Historic Places on September 9, 2026,

Montclair State University Ice Arena is an ice rink located on the grounds of Montclair State University that is located in Little Falls. The facility supports public skating, figure skating, and hockey.

== Sports ==
The New Jersey Jackals of the Frontier League played at Yogi Berra Stadium, located in Little Falls, on the campus of Montclair State University. For the 2023 season, the team relocated to Hinchliffe Stadium in Paterson.

== Government ==
=== Local government ===
Effective January 1, 2005, the form of government in Little Falls was changed (based on the results of a public referendum passed in November 2003) to the Mayor-Council form authorized by the Faulkner Act. The township is one of 71 (of the 564) municipalities statewide that use this form of government. The governing body is comprised of the Mayor and the five-member Township Council. Voters directly elect the mayor and the five township council members to four-year terms of office on a staggered basis, with either three seats or two seats (together with the mayoral seat) up for election in even-numbered years as part of the November general election. For most of its history, until 2003, Little Falls had been governed under the Township form of government by a township committee consisting of five committee members elected by the voters. Under this system, a chairman (mayor) and deputy-chair (deputy mayor) were selected annually by the Township Committee members.

As of 2023, the mayor of Little Falls is Democrat James Belford Damiano, whose term of office ends December 31, 2028. Members of the Township Council are Council President Anthony Sgobba (D, 2028), Christine Hablitz (D, 2028), Michael Murphy (R, 2026), Jayna Patel (R, 2026) and Christopher Vancheri (D, 2026).

In January 2017, Democrat Chris Vancheri was appointed to fill the council seat expiring in December 2018 that was vacated by James Damiano when he took office as mayor. In April 2017, Republican Marc Benitez was appointed to fill a vacant seat expiring in December 2018 that had been held by Joseph Maceri until he resigned after moving out of the township. In the November 2017 general election, Vancheri was elected to serve the balance of Damiano’s term of office and Democrat Tanya Seber defeated Benitez for Maceri’s unexpired seat. When Seber was sworn into office, it marked the first time in township history that all of the township's elected officials were Democrats.

Darlene Post (who returned to using her maiden name of Conti as of January 2015) won election to a full four-year term as mayor in the 2012 general election, along with all three of her Republican running mates for Township Council; Louis Fontana, Pamela Porter, and Joseph Rento (who won the balance of an unexpired term of office).

=== Federal, state and county representation ===
Little Falls is located in the 11th Congressional District and is part of New Jersey's 40th state legislative district.

For the 119th United States Congress, New Jersey's 11th congressional district is represented by Analilia Mejia (D, Glen Ridge) who was elected in a 2026 special election to serve for the remainder of the Congress following the resignation Mikie Sherrill (D, Montclair), who was elected Governor of New Jersey in 2025. New Jersey is represented in the United States Senate by Democrats Cory Booker (Newark, term ends 2027) and Andy Kim (Moorestown, term ends 2031).

For the 2026–2027 session, the 40th legislative district of the New Jersey Legislature is represented in the State Senate by Kristin Corrado (R, Totowa) and in the General Assembly by Al Barlas (R, Cedar Grove) and Christopher DePhillips (R, Wyckoff).

Passaic County is governed by a Board of County Commissioners, comprised of seven members who are elected at-large to staggered three-year terms office on a partisan basis, with two or three seats coming up for election each year as part of the November general election in a three-year cycle. At a reorganization meeting held in January, the board selects a Director and Deputy Director from among its members to serve for a one-year term. As of 2026, Passaic County's Commissioners are: Director Cassandra "Sandi" Lazzara (D), Little Falls, term as commissioner ends December 31, 2027; term as director ends 2026), Deputy Director Orlando Cruz (D, Paterson, term as commissioner and as deputy director ends 2026), Rodney DeVore (D, Paterson, 2027), Bruce James (D, Clifton, 2026) Michael Ramaglia (D, West Milford, 2028), Christina Schratz (D, Passaic, 2028) and Nick Veliky (D, Clifton, appointed to a term ending in 2027).

Constitutional officers, elected on a countywide basis, are County Clerk Danielle Ireland-Imhof (D, Hawthorne, 2028), Sheriff Thomas Adamo (D, Wayne, 2027) and Surrogate Zoila S. Cassanova (D, Wayne, 2026).

=== Politics ===
As of March 2011, there were a total of 7,632 registered voters in Little Falls, of which 2,084 (27.3% vs. 31.0% countywide) were registered as Democrats, 1,800 (23.6% vs. 18.7%) were registered as Republicans and 3,745 (49.1% vs. 50.3%) were registered as Unaffiliated. There were 3 voters registered as Libertarians or Greens. Among the township's 2010 Census population, 52.9% (vs. 53.2% in Passaic County) were registered to vote, including 61.3% of those ages 18 and over (vs. 70.8% countywide).

Gubernatorial election results for Little Falls
Year	Republican		Democratic		Third party(ies)	
Year	No.	%	No.	%	No.	%
2025	2,523	48.84%	2,612	50.56%	31	0.60%
2021	2,193	54.35%	1,824	45.20%	18	0.45%
2017	1,490	44.62%	1,766	52.89%	83	2.49%
2013	2,165	60.75%	1,355	38.02%	44	1.23%
2009	1,936	51.83%	1,577	42.22%	222	5.94%
2005	1,623	46.04%	1,806	51.23%	96	2.72%

In the 2012 presidential election, Democrat Barack Obama received 52.9% of the vote (3,190 cast), ahead of Republican Mitt Romney with 46.1% (2,780 votes), and other candidates with 1.0% (62 votes), among the 6,086 ballots cast by the township's 9,118 registered voters (54 ballots were spoiled), for a turnout of 66.7%. In the 2008 presidential election, Republican John McCain received 2,908 votes (49.5% vs. 37.7% countywide), ahead of Democrat Barack Obama with 2,734 votes (46.5% vs. 58.8%) and other candidates with 65 votes (1.1% vs. 0.8%), among the 5,879 ballots cast by the township's 7,835 registered voters, for a turnout of 75.0% (vs. 70.4% in Passaic County). In the 2004 presidential election, Republican George W. Bush received 2,994 votes (50.6% vs. 42.7% countywide), ahead of Democrat John Kerry with 2,723 votes (46.0% vs. 53.9%) and other candidates with 47 votes (0.8% vs. 0.7%), among the 5,921 ballots cast by the township's 7,798 registered voters, for a turnout of 75.9% (vs. 69.3% in the whole county).

Presidential elections results
Year	Republican	Democratic	Third Parties
2024	53.3% 3,450	43.6% 2,825	3.1% 180
2020	48.5% 3,340	49.1% 3,379	2.4% 82
2016	47.7% 3,039	48.9% 3,079	3.1% 198
2012	46.1% 2,780	52.9% 3,190	1.0% 62
2008	49.5% 2,908	46.5% 2,734	1.1% 65
2004	50.6% 2,994	46.0% 2,723	0.8% 47

In the 2013 gubernatorial election, Republican Chris Christie received 60.7% of the vote (2,165 cast), ahead of Democrat Barbara Buono with 38.0% (1,355 votes), and other candidates with 1.2% (44 votes), among the 3,615 ballots cast by the township's 9,689 registered voters (51 ballots were spoiled), for a turnout of 37.3%. In the 2009 gubernatorial election, Republican Chris Christie received 1,936 votes (51.3% vs. 43.2% countywide), ahead of Democrat Jon Corzine with 1,577 votes (41.8% vs. 50.8%), Independent Chris Daggett with 183 votes (4.8% vs. 3.8%) and other candidates with 39 votes (1.0% vs. 0.9%), among the 3,775 ballots cast by the township's 7,552 registered voters, yielding a 50.0% turnout (vs. 42.7% in the county).

United States Senate election results for Little Falls1
Year	Republican		Democratic		Third party(ies)	
Year	No.	%	No.	%	No.	%
2024	3,106	51.04%	2,789	45.83%	191	3.14%
2018	2,274	46.67%	2,327	47.76%	271	5.56%
2012	2,381	44.98%	2,797	52.84%	115	2.17%
2006	1,783	49.08%	1,791	49.30%	59	1.62%

United States Senate election results for Little Falls2
Year	Republican		Democratic		Third party(ies)	
Year	No.	%	No.	%	No.	%
2020	3,052	45.66%	3,470	51.92%	162	2.42%
2014	1,449	46.31%	1,624	51.90%	56	1.79%
2013	1,023	49.44%	1,017	49.15%	29	1.40%
2008	2,436	46.47%	2,724	51.96%	82	1.56%

== Education ==
For public school, students in pre-kindergarten through eighth grade are educated by the Little Falls Township Public Schools. As of the 2024–25 school year, the district, comprised of three schools, had an enrollment of 959 students and 88.0 classroom teachers (on an FTE basis), for a student–teacher ratio of 10.9:1. Schools in the district (with 2024–25 enrollment data from the National Center for Education Statistics) are Little Falls School #2 with 343 students in grades PreK-2, Little Falls School #3 with 217 students in grades 3-4 and Little Falls School #1 with 392 students in grades 5-8.

For ninth through twelfth grades, students in public school attend Passaic Valley Regional High School, which also serves students from Totowa and Woodland Park. The school facility is located in Little Falls. As of the 2024–25 school year, the high school had an enrollment of 1,093 students and 82.4 classroom teachers (on an FTE basis), for a student–teacher ratio of 13.3:1. Seats on the high school district's nine-member board of education are allocated based on the population of the constituent municipalities, with three seats each assigned Little Falls, Totowa and Woodland Park.

Most of the campus of Montclair State University is located in Little Falls. During 2011, the university employed 66 residents on a full or part-time basis, who earned almost $3.5 million in total compensation.

== Transportation ==
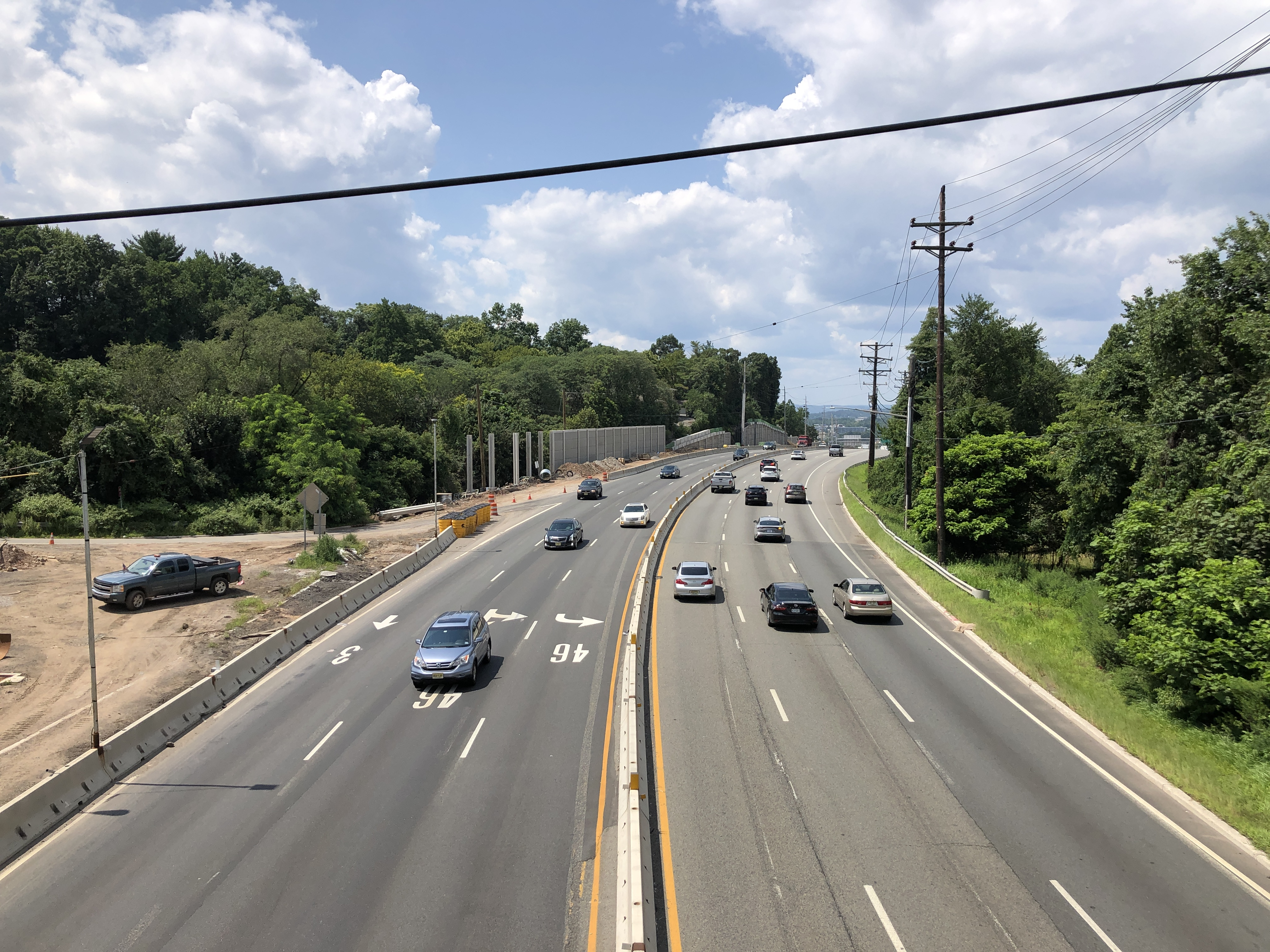
U.S. Route 46 westbound in Little Falls

=== Roads and highways ===
As of May 2010, the township had a total of 37.65 miles (60.59 km) of roadways, of which 24.55 miles (39.51 km) were maintained by the municipality, 10.87 miles (17.49 km) by Passaic County and 2.23 miles (3.59 km) by the New Jersey Department of Transportation.

Little Falls is crisscrossed by several major roadways, including U.S. Route 46 and New Jersey Route 23. The Garden State Parkway and Interstate 80 run near the municipality. There are numerous crossings of the Upper Passaic River in town.

=== Public transportation ===
The Little Falls station and Montclair State University station of NJ Transit both serve Little Falls, offering service on the Montclair-Boonton Line to Hoboken Terminal in Hoboken, or from Montclair State University Station on Midtown Direct trains to New York City's Pennsylvania Station in Midtown Manhattan via the Secaucus Junction. The township was formerly served by the Great Notch station until NJ Transit closed it in January 2010 because of low ridership.

NJ Transit bus transportation is offered to the Port Authority Bus Terminal in Midtown Manhattan on the 191, 194 and 195 routes. Newark, New Jersey, is served by routes 11 and 28 (on Saturdays and Sundays). Local routes are the 704 and 705 lines. In September 2012, as part of budget cuts, NJ Transit suspended service to Newark on the 75 line.

Little Falls is approximately 21 miles (34 km) from Newark Liberty International Airport and approximately 27 miles (43 km) from LaGuardia Airport in Flushing, Queens, New York.

== Notable people ==
People who were born in, residents of, or otherwise closely associated with Little Falls include:

- David Blaine (born 1973), illusionist
- Frank DeCaro (born 1962), author and television personality
- Daniel Johnston (born 1947), neuroscientist whose research has focused on the electrical properties of neuronal dendrites
- Bobby Marks (born 1973), former National Basketball Association assistant general manager of the Brooklyn Nets
- Lloyd B. Marsh (1893–1971), politician who served as Secretary of State of New Jersey and Chairman of the New Jersey Republican State Committee
- Kit McClure (born 1951), saxophonist, trombonist and bandleader
- Leonard Schoonmaker (1882–1950), fencer who competed in the individual foil and épée events at the 1920 Summer Olympics
- Franklin E. Sigler (1924–1995), U.S. Marine who was the recipient of the congressional Medal of Honor for his actions during the Battle of Iwo Jima
- Robert Crooks Stanley (1876–1951), former chairman and president of International Nickel Company, known for discovering the alloy Monel
- Grif Teller (1899–1993), artist known for his paintings for the Pennsylvania Railroad
- Lois Utz (1932–1986), children's author
- Vikki Ziegler (born c. 1972), lawyer and author who was the focus of the reality television show Untying the Knot

== In popular culture ==
- A delicatessen on Main Street in Little Falls was featured in the episode "House Arrest" from the second season of television series The Sopranos.
- The township was well known for the Colonial Inn, a hotel and lounge where comedian Jackie Gleason performed stand-up in the 1930s.
- The township is also mentioned in the Jonas Brothers documentary Chasing Happiness (2019). The family moved there in 2005 and the brothers wrote many of the songs included on their first album in their Little Falls home.
