= Robert Leckie =

Robert Leckie may refer to:

- Robert Leckie (RCAF officer) (1890–1975), Canadian air marshal
- Robert Leckie (author) (1920–2001), American author of military history
- Robert Leckie (footballer) (1846–1887), Scottish footballer
- Robert Gilmour Leckie (1833–1913), Canadian mining engineer
