= Monell (surname) =

Monell is a surname: Notable people with the surname include:

- Ambrose Monell (1873–1921), American industrialist and military commander
- Johnny Monell (born 1986), American baseball player
- Robert Monell (1787–1860), American lawyer and politician

== See also ==
- Monell Chemical Senses Center
- Monel, an alloy named after Ambrose Monell
