= Henry Wingate =

Henry Wingate may refer to:

- Henry Travillion Wingate (born 1947), United States district judge
- Henry S. Wingate (1905–1982) was an American businessman
