= Paul E. Queneau =

- Born: March 20, 1911; Philadelphia, Pennsylvania
- Died: March 31, 2012 (aged 101); Hanover, New Hampshire
- Education: Columbia University (BA, BSc, EE); Delft University of Technology (PhD)
- Scientific career
- Fields: Chemical engineering
- Workplaces: Dartmouth College

Paul Etienne Queneau (March 20, 1911 – March 31, 2012) was an American professor of chemical and metallurgical engineering at Dartmouth College. He was a member of the National Academy of Engineering.

== Biography ==
Queneau was born in Philadelphia on March 20, 1911, to Augustin Leon Jean and Abbie Jean (Blaisdell) Queneau, a descendant of Ralfe Bleasdale, who settled in Pemaquid Point in Maine in 1635. His father was a French-born metallurgist who served as technical assistant to the president of the United States Steel Corporation.

Queneau earned his B.A. from Columbia College in 1931, his BSc and E.E. from Columbia School of Engineering and Applied Science in 1932 and 1933, respectively. After Columbia, he began working for the International Nickel Company (INCO). He volunteered in the United States Army during World War II and was trained at the United States Army Engineer School before being dispatched to Europe with the United States Army Corps of Engineers. He was awarded a Bronze Star Medal, an Army Commendation Medal, and a European Theatre of Operation Ribbon with five campaign stars.

Queneau returned to INCO after the war, and he focused on improving the environmental record of smelters with oxygen, developing a pioneering commercial oxygen reactor in 1952. He retired in 1969 as INCO’s vice president, chief technical officer, and assistant to the chairman. He then earned his doctorate from Delft University of Technology at age 60 and joined the faculty of the Thayer School of Engineering in 1971.

In 1971, Queneau and Reinhardt Schuhmann Jr. proposed the Q-S oxygen process that enables smelting in a single process within a continuous oxygen converter. They later partnered with the German engineering firm Lurgi and co-invented what came to be known as the Queneau-Schuhmann-Lurgi process for efficient lead extraction.

Queneau was elected a fellow and served as a president of The Minerals, Metals & Materials Society in 1969. A geologist, he also helped photograph the Perry River region of the Arctic by a 13-foot canoe with artist and ornithologist Peter Scott and zoologist Harold Hanson. He was elected to the National Academy of Engineering in 1981.

Queneau died on March 31, 2012, at age 101 in Hanover, New Hampshire.

=== Publications ===
- Boldt, Joseph R. Jr; Queneau, Paul (1967). The Winning of Nickel. Toronto: Longmans Canada.
