= Robert Gilmour Leckie =

Canadian mining engineer

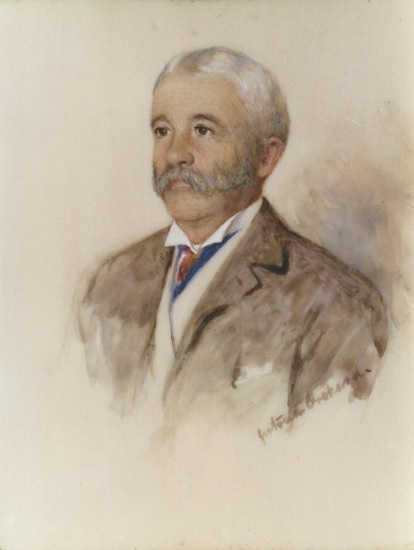
- Born: 23 August 1833; Renfrewshire, Scotland
- Died: 5 November 1913 (aged 80); Sudbury, Ontario, Canada
- Citizenship: Canadian
- Education: Glasgow Technical College
- Occupation: Mining engineer
- Spouses: Sarah Jane Plimsoll Edwards (m. 1868; died 1893) Margaret Harriet Potter (m. 1910)

Robert Gilmour Leckie (23 August 1833 – 5 November 1913) was a Scottish-born Canadian major who may almost be described as the father of mining engineering in Canada. He had a long and professional career as a mining engineer in the Canadian provinces of Quebec, Nova Scotia and Ontario, during which time he had contributed technical articles to mining publications.

== Personal life ==
Leckie was born to Robert Leckie and Margaret Gilmour in Renfrewshire, Scotland, on August 23, 1833. He attended the High School of Glasgow and Glasgow Technical College. In 1856, he came to Montreal, where he was associated with a shipbuilding enterprise for a time. Leckie took a great interest in military affairs during his later years in life and held a commission as lieutenant in a rifle company raised in the Eastern Townships during the 1866–1871 Fenian raids. In 1882, he was gazetted major in the 53rd Sherbrooke Battalion, with which regiment he remained for several years. By 1894, Leckie became well-known to Montreal businessmen and financiers as a businessman of ability and energy.

Robert Gilmore Leckie was an ardent imperialist, a stalwart conservative in politics and a member of the Church of England. He was also an absolute sportsman and participated in curling, racing, cricketing, fishing and hunting. Leckie, in co-operation with Charles Fergie and John Hardman, was chiefly responsible for the organization of the Mining Society of Nova Scotia, of which he was a vice-president. He was the first president of the Federated Canadian Mining Institute and a charter member of the Canadian Mining Institute, the latter of which was a reorganization of the original society. Only once in 20 years had he failed to be present at the annual meetings of the Canadian Mining Institute. In 1879, Leckie joined the American Institute of Mining Engineers and was a vice-president of that society in 1893–1894.

Leckie married his first wife Sarah Jane Plimsoll Edwards on 1 September 1868, with whom he had eight children: Robert Gilmour Edwards Leckie (b. 1869), Alice Agnes Leckie (b. 1870), John Edward Leckie (b. 1872), Margaret Amy Gilmour Leckie (b. 1875), Marion Annie Urquhart Leckie (b. 1877), Edith Lydia Louise Leckie (b. 1878), Florence Sarah Plimsoll Leckie (b. 1880) and Dorothy Frances Worthington Leckie (b. 1887). Edwards died in 1893 and Leckie subsequently married his second wife Margaret Harriet Potter in 1910. They had one daughter, Phyllis Gilmour Leckie (b. 1910). Robert Gilmour Leckie died at the age of 80 on November 5, 1913 in Sudbury, Ontario.

== Mining career ==
Leckie became interested in mining in the Eastern Townships of Quebec very shortly after his association with the Montreal shipbuilding enterprise. In the Eastern Townships he was associated with an early copper mining effort and also held an interest in nickel properties in the Township of Orford, which were subsequently acquired by Boston capitalists including Robert Means Thompson who organized the Orford Nickel Company. Leckie was for some time managing director of the Orford Nickel Company.

In Nova Scotia, he was associated with several coal and gold mining enterprises and around 1880, was responsible, in association with the late William Hedley of Halifax and Senator Senecal of Springhill, in Cumberland County, with the Springhill and Parrsborough Railway Company, thus forming the Cumberland Railway and Coal Company, of which he became managing director. Under his direction, this undertaking from modest beginnings grew to great importance, attaining an output of 500,000 tons of coal per year. During Leckie's regime at Springhill, the Provincial Workmen's Association was organized in Nova Scotia. In 1890, Leckie became general manager of the Londonderry Iron Company, a post he held for three years. At this time he was also successful in consolidating several smaller coal undertakings in Cumberland County, including the Joggins Mining Company and the Milner under the title of the Canada Coal and Railway Company, which later became the Maritime Coal Power and Railway Company. Before his departure from Nova Scotia in 1898, Leckie acquired the Torbrook iron mines, which he worked until they were purchased by the Drummonds of Montreal.

After leaving Torbrook, he acted in the capacity of examining engineer for Robert Means Thompson of New York and in this connection reported on nickel and other mines in New Caledonia, Norway, Sweden and Australia. For many years Leckie was a consulting engineer at Sudbury for the Canadian Copper Company. After retiring from consulting practice, he focused his activities on acquiring and partially developing promising prospects in Northern Ontario. This included the Leckie and Northland mines in Temagami, which had been under development by him in 1904, and the Long Lake Mine near Sudbury, which was successfully worked by the Canadian Exploration Company from 1909 to 1916. In 1909, Leckie was arrested in Sudbury on a charge of fraud for securing a payment under false pretences. On 20 July 1909, Leckie appeared before Judge Leet at a Montreal court. The trial resulted in Leckie's acquittal.

== Arms ==
Coat of arms of Robert Gilmour Leckie

Notes
Matriculated at the Lyon Court in 1912.
Crest
An anchor Or cabled Gules.
Escutcheon
Argent on a chevron between three roses Gules barbed and seeded Vert a spur Or.
Motto
Gubernat Navem Deus
