= Ductile iron =

Type of cast iron

Ductile iron, also known as ductile cast iron, nodular cast iron, spheroidal graphite iron, spheroidal graphite cast iron and SG iron, is a type of graphite-rich cast iron discovered in 1943 by Keith Millis. While most varieties of cast iron are weak in tension and brittle, ductile iron has much more impact and fatigue resistance, due to its nodular graphite inclusions.

Augustus F. Meehan was awarded U.S. patent 1,790,552 in January 1931 for inoculating iron with calcium silicide to produce ductile iron subsequently licensed as Meehanite, still produced as of 2024. In October 1949 Keith Dwight Millis, Albert Paul Gagnebin and Norman Boden Pilling, all working for INCO, received U.S. patent 2,485,760 on a cast ferrous alloy using magnesium for ductile iron production.

== Metallurgy ==
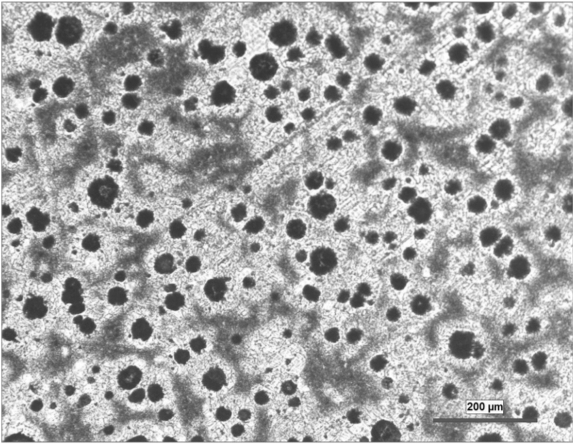
Etched and polished ductile iron microstructure at 100× magnification, showing carbon islanding effect around nodules.

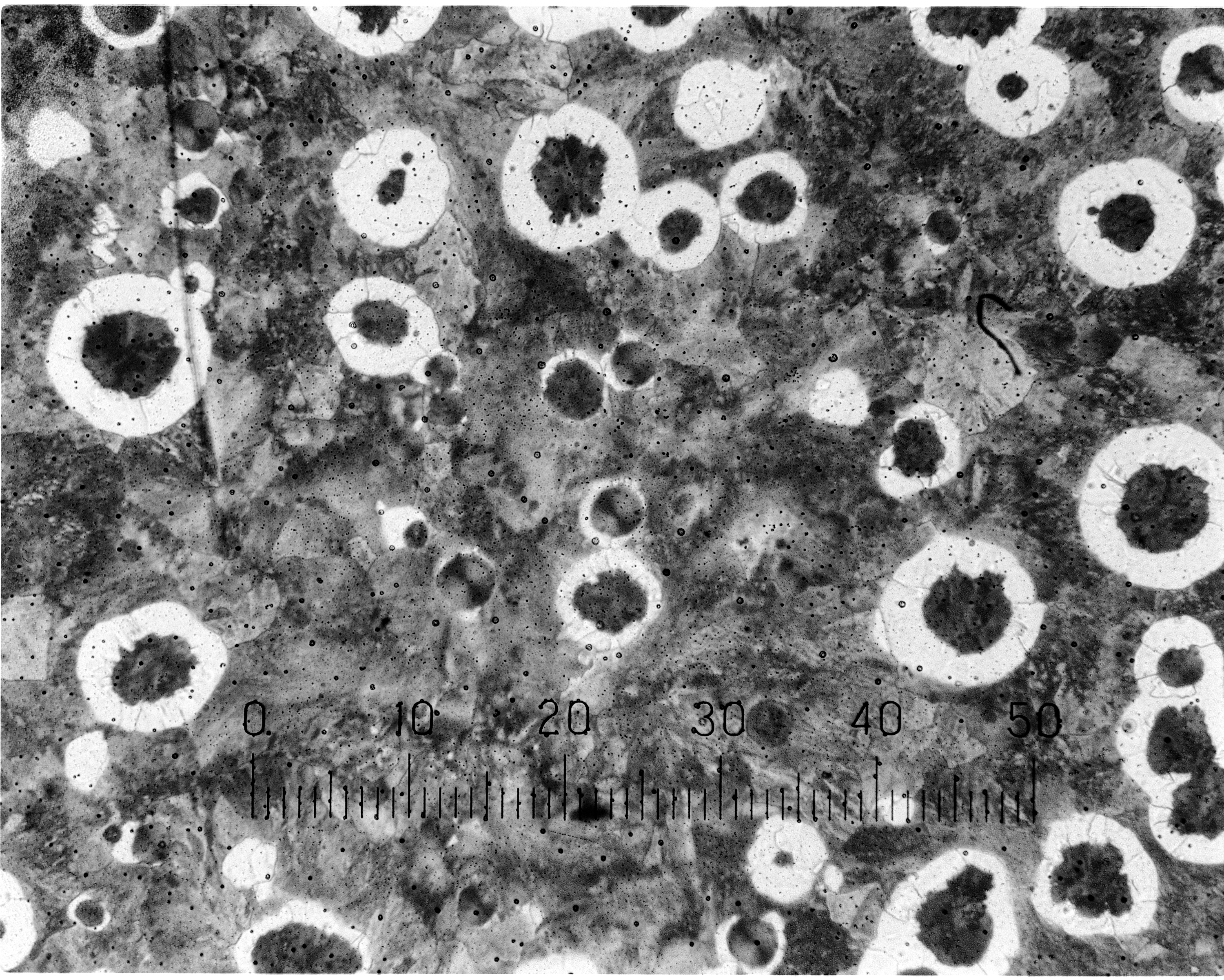
Another micrograph showing the carbon islanding effect, with nodules surrounded by areas depleted of carbon

Ductile iron is not a single material but part of a group of materials which can be produced with a wide range of properties through control of their microstructure. The common defining characteristic of this group of materials is the shape of the graphite. In ductile irons, graphite is in the form of nodules rather than flakes as in grey iron. Whereas sharp graphite flakes create stress concentration points within the metal matrix, rounded nodules inhibit the creation of cracks, thus providing the enhanced ductility that gives the alloy its name. Nodule formation is achieved by adding nodulizing elements, most commonly magnesium (magnesium boils at 1100 °C and iron melts at 1500 °C) and, less often now, cerium (usually in the form of mischmetal). Tellurium has also been used. Yttrium, often a component of mischmetal, has also been studied as a possible nodulizer.

Austempered ductile iron (ADI; i.e., austenite tempered) was discovered in the 1950s but was commercialized and achieved success only some years later. In ADI, the metallurgical structure is manipulated through a sophisticated heat treating process.

== Composition ==
Mass fraction (%) for ferritic ductile iron castings
Fe	C	Si	Ni	Mn	Mg	Cr	P	S	Cu
Balance	3.0–3.7	1.2–2.3	1.0	0.25	0.07	0.07	0.03		0.1
Balance	3.3–3.6	2.2–2.8		0.1-0.2	0.03–0.04		0.005–0.04	0.005–0.02	<0.40

Elements such as copper or tin may be added to increase tensile and yield strength while simultaneously reducing ductility. Improved corrosion resistance can be achieved by replacing 15–30% of the iron in the alloy with varying amounts of nickel, copper, or chromium. Other ductile iron compositions often have a small amount of sulfur as well.

Silicon as a graphite formation element can be partially replaced by aluminum to provide better oxidation protection.

== Applications ==
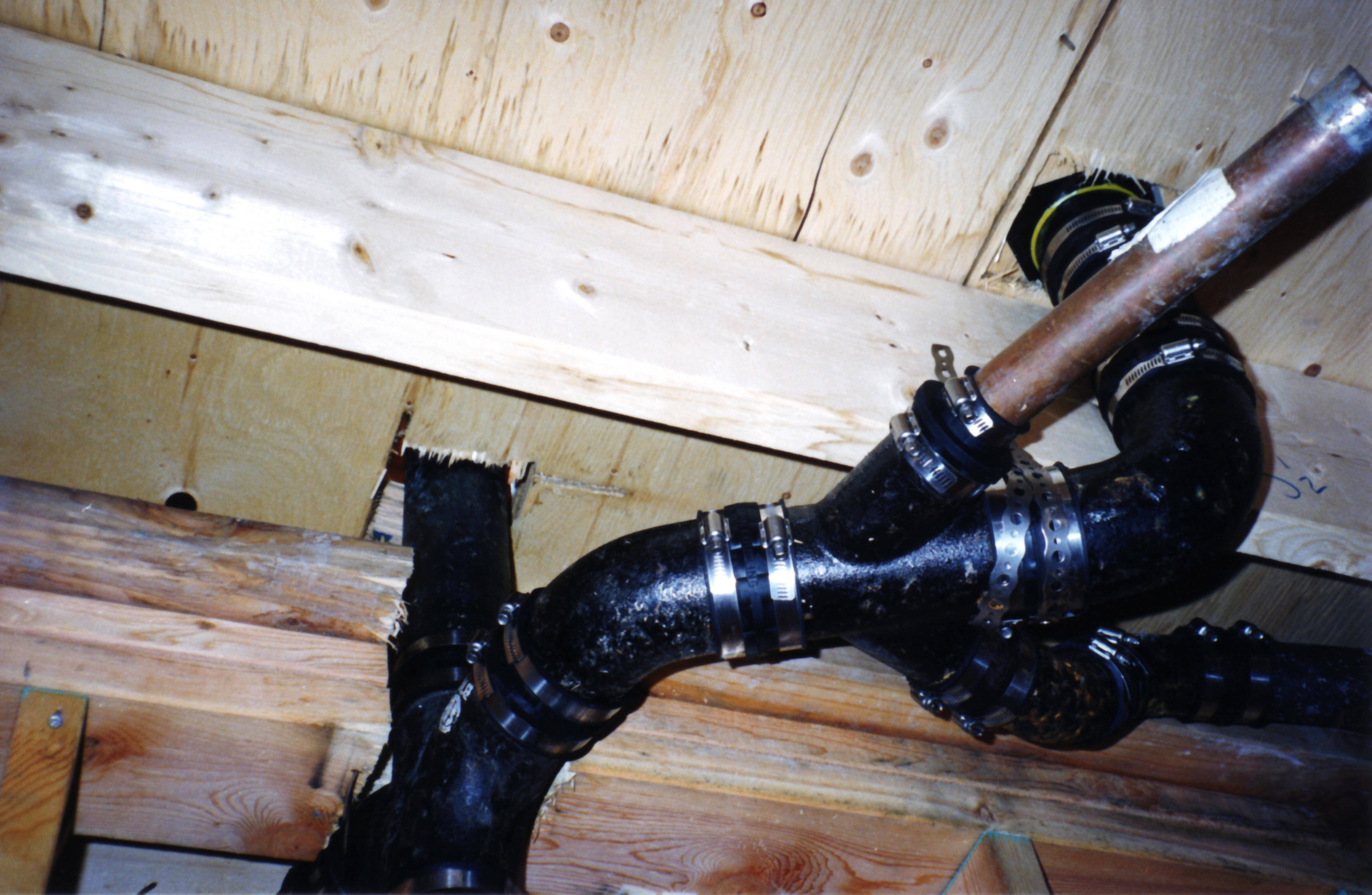
Cast-iron "no hub" drain waste and vent (DWV) piping

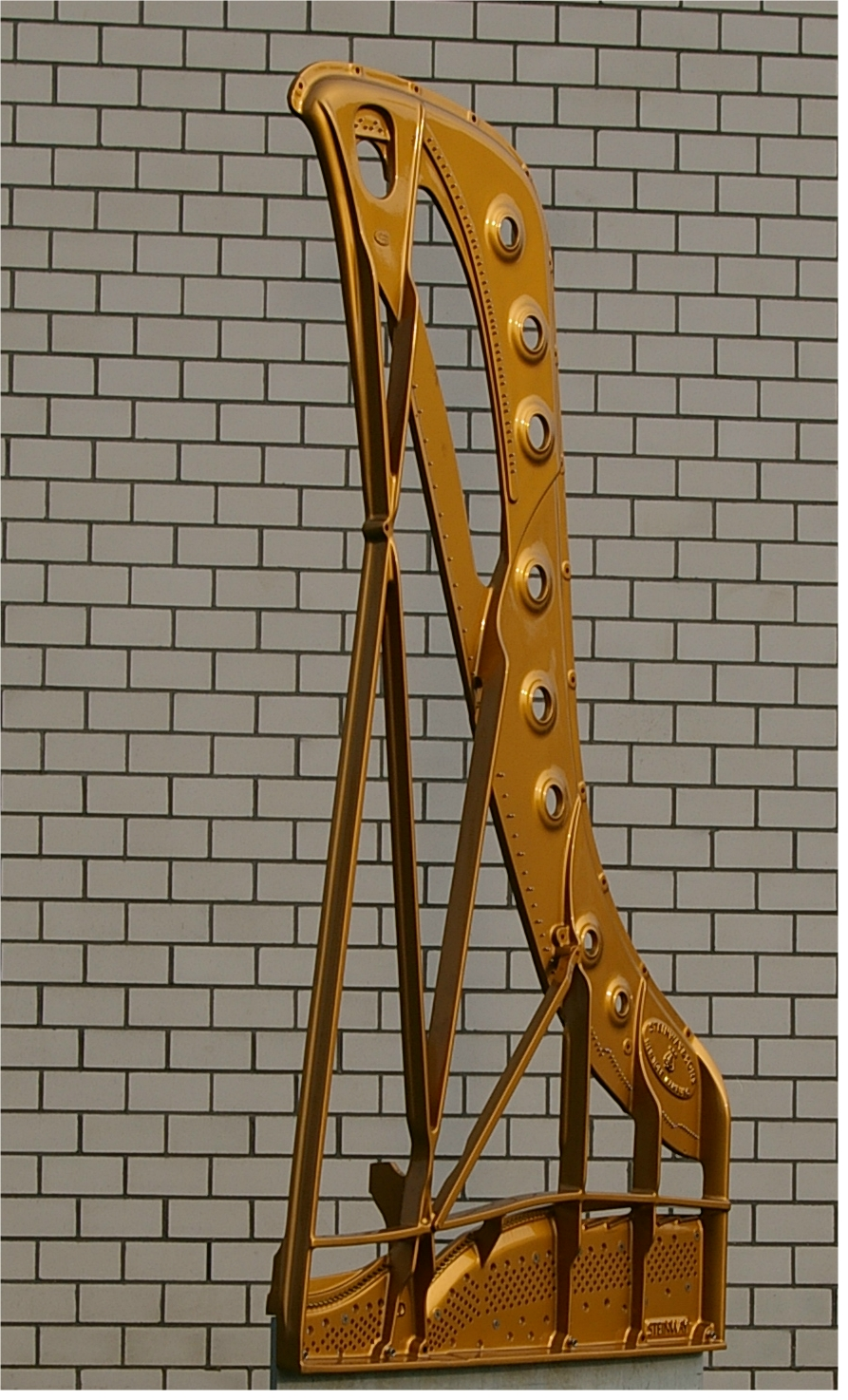
Cast iron harp of a grand piano

Much of the annual production of ductile iron is in the form of ductile iron pipe, used for water and sewer lines. It competes with polymeric materials such as polyvinyl chloride (PVC), high-density polyethylene (HDPE), low-density polyethylene(LDPE) and polypropylene, which are all much lighter than steel or ductile iron; being softer and weaker, these require protection from physical damage.

Ductile iron is specifically useful in many automotive components, where strength must surpass that of aluminum but more expensive steel is not necessarily required. Other major industrial applications include off-highway diesel trucks, class 8 trucks, agricultural tractors, and oil well pumps. In the wind power industry ductile iron is used for hubs and structural parts like machine frames. Ductile iron is suitable for large and complex shapes and high (fatigue) loads.

Ductile iron is used in many piano harps (the iron plates which anchor piano strings).

Ductile iron is used for vises. Previously, regular cast iron or steel was commonly used. The properties of ductile iron make it a significant upgrade in strength and durability from cast iron without having to use steel, which is expensive and has poor castability.

== See also ==
- Malleable iron
- Wrought iron
