= Keith Millis =

American metallurgist (1915–1992)

Keith Dwight Millis
- Born: May 20, 1915; Rensselaer, New York, United States
- Died: July 6, 1992 (aged 77); Scotch Plains, New Jersey, United States
- Education: Rensselaer Polytechnic Institute
- Known for: Inventor of Ductile iron
- Awards: 1952 - AFS Gold Medal; 1959 - Annual Achievement of the New York Chapter of the American Society of Metals; 1962 - Franklin Institute's Francis J. Clamer Medal; 1964 - Gold Medal of the Gray and Ductile Iron Society; 1965 - DIS Annual Award; 1965 - Modern Pioneers in Industry Award of the NAM
- Scientific career
- Fields: Metallurgy; Foundry
- Workplaces: Inco

Keith Dwight Millis (May 20, 1915 – July 6, 1992) was an American metallurgical engineer and inventor of ductile iron.

Keith Millis grew up in Rensselaer, New York and earned his Bachelor of Science in Metallurgical Engineering as a 1938 graduate of Rensselaer Polytechnic Institute. A year later he was conferred a Master of Science degree in Metallurgical Engineering at RPI.

Early in the Second World War, chromium was considered critical to the war effort and experimentation was conducted by Millis to find a substitute. He made his discovery while experimenting with molten iron and magnesium. The original intent was to find another element that would cause all the carbon in the cast iron alloy to be combined as carbide. Magnesium was a known carbide former. Instead, the graphite in the iron formed into spheroidal shapes, and the cast iron had high tensile strength plus it exhibited ductility. Thus was born ductile iron in 1943.

Millis and others at the International Nickel Company (Inco) sought and obtained U.S. patent 2,485,760 on October 25, 1949, for magnesium additions to cast iron that would spheroidize the graphite and dramatically ductilize the material.

As an employee of Inco, Millis worked to promote the use of ductile iron as it began to be used as a commercial material. He also helped to found the Ductile Iron Society, an organization whose purpose is to promote the production and application of ductile iron castings.

Millis died in 1992.

== Legacy ==
Since his death, the Ductile Iron Society has held the "Keith Millis World Symposium on Ductile Iron", a technical meeting concerning all facets of ductile iron material, processing and applications. The event has been held approximately every 5 years:

- 1993 - Hilton Head Island, SC
- 1998 - Hilton Head Island, SC
- 2003 - Hilton Head Island, SC
- 2008 - Las Vegas, NV
- 2013 - Nashville, TN

The most recent symposium was co-sponsored by the American Foundry Society. He was inducted into RPI's alumni hall of fame in 1999. A perpetual international scholarship has been awarded by the Ductile Iron Society Foundry Educational Foundation in Millis's name since 1991.
