= Reynier Speer House =

Historic house in New Jersey, United States

- U.S. National Register of Historic Places
- New Jersey Register of Historic Places
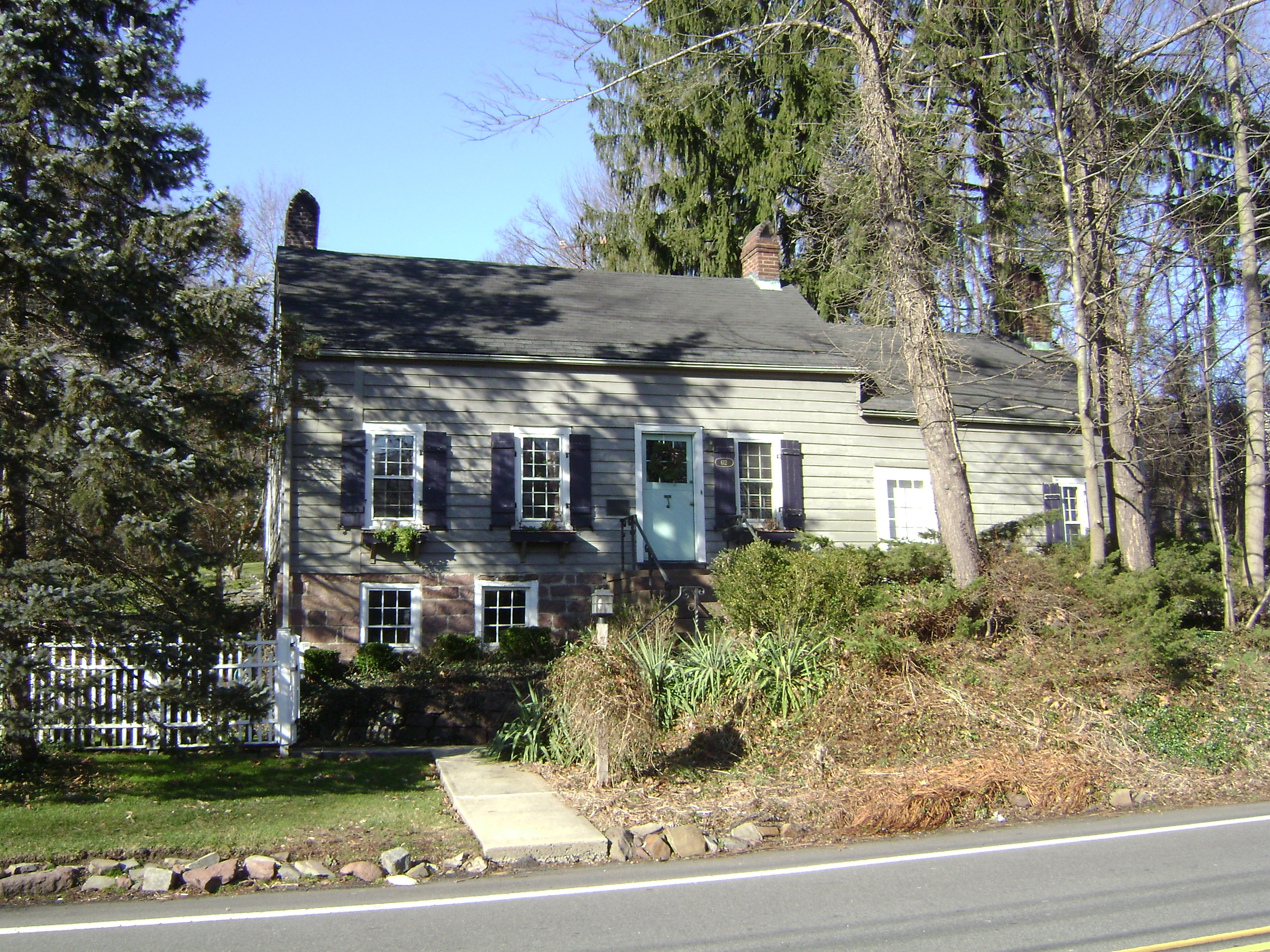
- Reynier Speer House seen while traveling north on Upper Mountain Road in late December, 2011.

- Location within Passaic County, New Jersey Location within New Jersey Location within the United States
- Location: 612 Upper Mountain Avenue, Little Falls, New Jersey
- Coordinates: 40°51′37.44″N 74°12′10.61″W
- Area: 2 acres (0.81 ha)
- Built: 1785
- Architect: Reynier Speer
- Architectural style: Colonial, Dutch Colonial
- NRHP reference No.: 85001566
- NJRHP No.: 2338

Significant dates
- Added to NRHP: July 18, 1985
- Designated NJRHP: May 13, 1985

The Reynier Speer House is located in Little Falls, Passaic County, New Jersey, United States. The house was built in 1785 by Reynier Speer and was added to the National Register of Historic Places on July 18, 1985. Some historians suggest that an earlier building from 1680 occupied the location, but there is no archival evidence for this.

== See also ==
- National Register of Historic Places listings in Passaic County, New Jersey
