= Albert Gagnebin =

American metallurgist (1909–1999)

- Born: January 23, 1909; Torrington, Connecticut
- Died: February 14, 1999 (aged 90); Jupiter, Florida
- Education: Yale University (BSc '30, MSc '32)
- Spouse: Genevieve Hope (m. 1935)

Albert Paul Gagnebin (January 23, 1909 – February 14, 1999) was an American metallurgist who became president then Chairman of Inco Limited. He co-discovered ductile cast iron.

== Early life and education ==
Albert Paul Gagnebin was born in 1909. He received a metallurgy degree from Yale University.

== Career ==
Gagnebin started work at the International Nickel Company's laboratory in Bayonne, New Jersey. Over the course of a few years, he and co-inventors Keith Mills and Norman Pilling developed ductile cast iron, which they had observed by chance. The product was patented in 1949. In 1952, the American Foundrymen's Society honored Gagnebin and Millis with the Peter L. Simpson Gold Medal for their finding.

Gagnebin wrote The Fundamentals of Iron and Steel Castings in 1957. The book went through at least four editions by 1968.

He rose in the company, becoming vice-president in 1964 and president in 1967. The following year, he opened five new mines. In March 1969, he cemented the COFIMPAC accord with the French government for INCO to begin to exploit a property in New Caledonia. Gagnebin became chairman in 1971 before retiring in 1974. He remained on the board of directors until 1980.

In 1977, Gagnebin earned the Charles F. Rand Memorial Gold Medal from the American Institute of Mining, Metallurgical, and Petroleum Engineers for distinguishing himself in mining administration.

== Death ==
Gagnebin died in February 1999. He was survived by his wife (Grace) and two daughters (Anne Coffin and Joan Wicks).
