= Robert Crooks Stanley =

American industrialist and mining engineer

- Born: August 1, 1876; Little Falls, New Jersey
- Died: February 12, 1951 (aged 74); Dongan Hills, Staten Island
- Education: Stevens Institute of Technology; Columbia University
- Spouse: Alma Guyon Timolat (m. 1912)

Robert Crooks Stanley (August 1, 1876 – February 12, 1951) was an American industrialist and mining engineer. He was chairman and president of International Nickel Company and discovered the alloy Monel.

== Biography ==
Stanley was born on August 1, 1876, in Little Falls, New Jersey. He attended Montclair High School as a star football player and graduated from the Stevens Institute of Technology in 1899 and received his engineer of mines degree from Columbia School of Mines in 1901.

Stanley joined International Nickel (Inco) in 1901, serving as general superintendent from 1914 to 1918, and as vice president from 1918 to 1922. He then served as president from 1922 to 1950 and was chairman from 1937 until his death. Under Stanley, nickel reached worldwide importance, and the company saw rapid growth after World War I, producing 75% of the world's nickel. He also discovered Monel in 1905 and conceived the process of producing the alloy from ore.

During the Second World War Stanley opined that "The first obligation of every corporation, of every individual, is to give the utmost support to his Government in the prosecution of the war..."

Stanley was also a director of United States Steel, Mond Nickel Company, Canadian Pacific Railway, and Chase National Bank.

Stanley was made a Commander of the Order of Leopold in 1937 and was conferred King's Medal for Service in the Cause of Freedom in 1947. He also received a Charles F. Rand Memorial Gold Medal from the American Institute of Mining, Metallurgical, and Petroleum Engineers in 1941. He was inducted into the Canadian Mining Hall of Fame in 1990 for building Inco into the largest nickel company in the world and pioneering a number of improved refining and production processes of nickel. He was also named by Harvard Business School as one of the "Great American Business Leaders of the 20th Century."

Stanley received honorary degrees from Stevens Institute of Technology, Columbia University, Queen's University at Kingston, and Rensselaer Polytechnic Institute.

Stanley died of a stroke at his home in Dongan Hills, Staten Island, on February 12, 1951, at the age of 74.
