= Little Falls Municipal Building =

- U.S. National Register of Historic Places
- New Jersey Register of Historic Places
- Little Falls Old Town Hall on Stevens Avenue

- Location within Passaic County, New Jersey Location within New Jersey Location within the United States
- Location: 35 Stevens Avenue, Little Falls, New Jersey
- Coordinates: 40°52′48.7″N 74°13′45.3″W
- Built: 1914
- Architect: William T. Fanning
- Architectural style: American Craftsman
- NRHP reference No.: 100013417
- NJRHP No.: 2337

Significant dates
- Added to NRHP: September 9, 2026
- Designated NJRHP: August 5, 2026

The Little Falls Municipal Building, also known as the Little Falls Old Town Hall, is a historic brick building located at 35 Stevens Avenue, also facing Warren Street, in the township of Little Falls in Passaic County, New Jersey, United States. It was designed by the architect William T. Fanning with Craftsman style and built in 1914. The building was added to the National Register of Historic Places on September 9, 2026, for its significance in architecture.

== History and description ==
The building was designed to handle several aspects of municipal government for Little Falls. The first floor housed the fire department and the police department. The second floor had offices for township officials and council. The fire department moved out in 1957. The Little Falls Historical Society is renovating the building. By 2004, a new Little Falls Municipal Building had been built at 225 Main Street.

Corner view

View from Warren Street

== See also ==
- National Register of Historic Places listings in Passaic County, New Jersey
