= Lois Utz =

American poet

Lois Utz (née Cook) (January 4, 1932 – November 12, 1986; Paterson, New Jersey) was an American children's book author, illustrator, poet, and artist.

For most of her life, Utz resided in Little Falls, New Jersey. She received her Associate degree in Fine Arts from the Art Students League of New York. Utz wrote a poetry column for the Paterson Morning Call and published in literary anthologies nationally. In 1957, she married Donald Utz, and in 1962 they had a daughter, Heidi. While exhibiting her paintings and collages, she began creating children's books that were first published in 1972. For many years, she produced and sold collage works through her business, Lois Utz Originals. Utz also collaborated as a lyricist with classical composer Richard Lane on a number of songs, including several for children. Throughout her life, she worked as a volunteer for the mentally ill and wrote several novels about her experiences. She later received a Bachelor of Arts degree in psychology and a Master of Arts degree in counseling, and practiced as a therapist until her death in 1986.

Her children's books are known for their whimsical illustrations of animals and stories told in rhyme. Her illustrations often incorporate elements of collage.

== Bibliography ==
- The Pineapple Duck with the Peppermint Bill (Bobbs-Merrill, 1968)
- A Delightful Day with Bella Ballet (Oddo Publ., 1972)
- The Houndstooth Check (Oddo, 1972)
- The Simple Pink Bubble That Ended the Trouble with Jonathan Hubble (Oddo, 1972)
- The King, the Queen, and the Lima Bean (Oddo, 1974).
- Tara's Sister (unpublished) young adult novel
- Parenthesis Twenty-Five (unpublished) poetry anthology

== Sources ==
- Contemporary Authors, Detroit: Thomson Gale Pub., v. 25-28R, 735. ISBN 0-8103-0034-6
- Contemporary Authors, Detroit: Thomson Gale Pub., 1987, v.121, 421. ISBN 0-8103-1921-7
- Something About the Author, Detroit: Thomson Gale, 1975, v. 5.
- Something About the Author, Detroit: Thomson Gale, obituary, 1987, v. 50. ISBN 0-8103-2260-9
- Star Ledger, Newark, NJ, obituary (Nov. 16, 1986).
- Who's Who in America, 42nd ed., New Providence, NJ: Marquis Pub., 1982.
