= Samuel J. Ritchie =

Samuel J. Ritchie, an American millionaire from Ohio, founded the Canadian Copper Company (CCC) in 1886 to exploit the minerals near what was to become known after 1902 as Copper Cliff. He was also president of the Central Ontario Railway (COR).

== Biography ==
In the early 1880s, Ritchie invested in Ontario and became president of the Central Ontario Railroad, and founded the CCC, which began in May 1886 to mine at what became known as Copper Cliff. In 1888 the Copper Cliff smelter was born. During the 1890s, it harnessed the output of six mines with its 13 Herreshoff furnaces of 125-ton capacity each.

Meanwhile, Robert Means Thompson contracted through his Orford Copper Company with the CCC to refine ore which was supposed to contain 7% copper. The ore from the CCC was "found to contain only 4.5 percent copper but it also contained 2.5 percent nickel. This was not what had been expected nor what was wanted. Since Thompson and Ritchie were primarily interested in copper they had to solve three problems: copper and nickel had to be separated and refined; a nickel market had to be developed; and a profit had to be made." This prompted the development of the Orford "tops and bottoms" process by 1893.

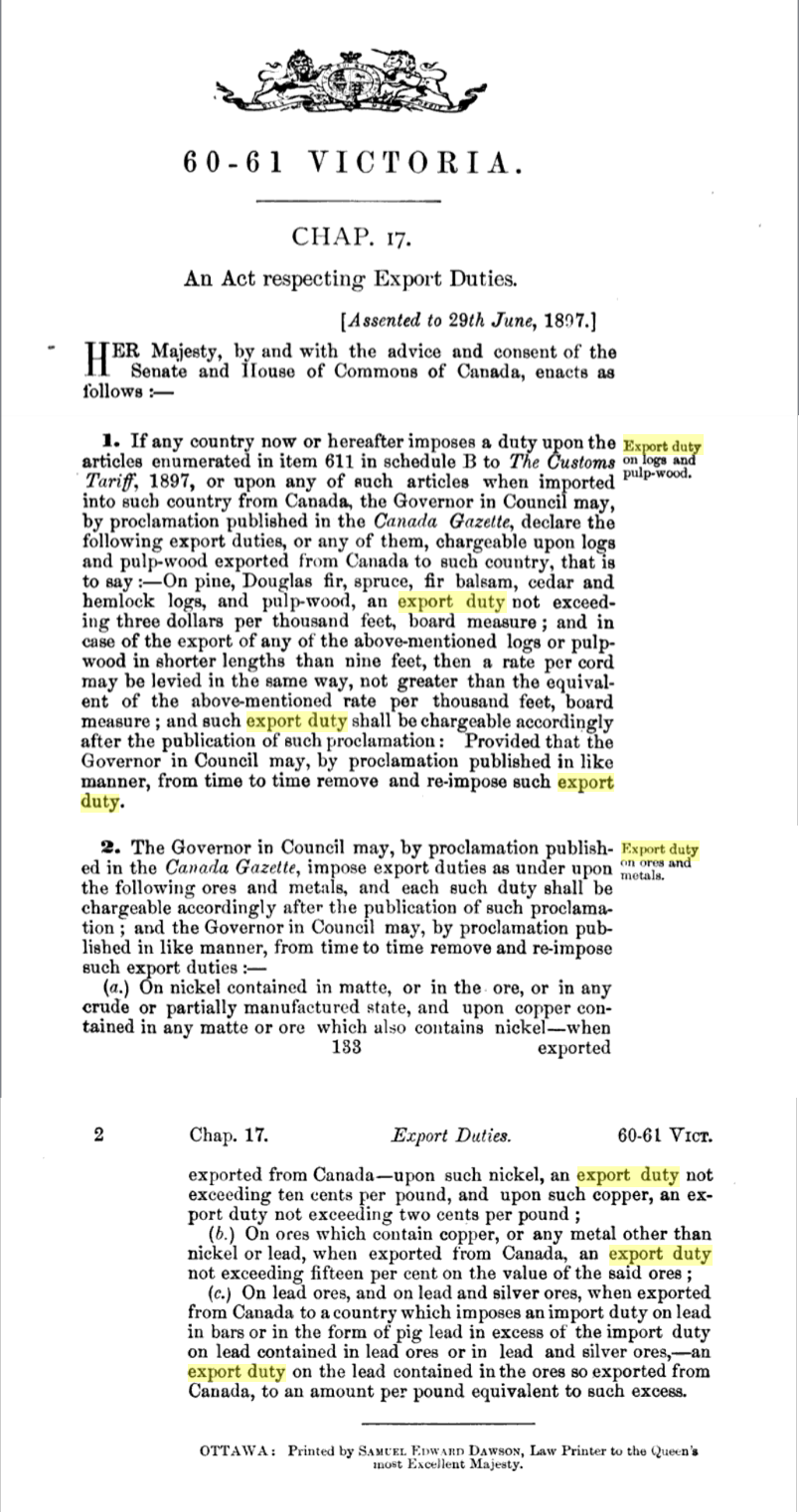
1897 Statutes of Canada 60-61 Victoria c17 - An Act respecting Export Duties

Ritchie was ousted from the board of the CCC in 1891. In 1892 they hired Jules Garnier and in 1893 Carl Hoepfner, both fruitlessly, in their quest to make nickel at a competitive cost to the Orford Nickel Company. Ritchie then lobbied for a Nickel export tax from Canada, with which to subsidize a smelter and refinery operation. He was partially successful in 1897 with the passage through Parliament in Ottawa of 60-61 Victoria chapter 17 An Act respecting Export Duties but in order to levy the duty this text required the consent of the Governor-General, which was never forthcoming because Sir Wilfrid Laurier prevented it. Meanwhile in 1902 the CCC and Orford and other companies amalgamated into the International Nickel Company (INCO).

Ritchie finally obtained his dream in 1916: the Big Nickel scandal forced INCO to re-situate its Constable Hook operations to near the hydroelectric power source of Niagara Falls in Port Colborne.

Ritchie began a $10 million lawsuit in 1893 against Judge Stevenson Burke, ex-Senator Henry B. Payne, H.P. McIntosh, Charles W. Gingham and others.

His successful 1895 argument in Ritchie v McMullen allowed the courts of the US to enforce judgment of a Canadian court.

== Family ==
Ritchie married Sophronia Jane Hale; together they raised three children: a daughter called Clara Belle, and sons called Lewis Andrew and Charles Edward (Ned). It was Ritchie's daughter that bequeathed five linear feet of familial photographs to the Western Reserve Historical Society.

Sophronia was an elder sibling to Charles Oviatt Hale, a noted state legislator.

== See also ==
- Mining in Canada
