= Ambrose Monell =

American metallurgist (1873–1921)

- Born: 1873
- Died: May 2, 1921 (aged 47–48); Beacon, New York, U.S.
- Education: Columbia University
- Occupations: Industrialist; military commander
- Employer: International Nickel Company
- Known for: Namesake of the Monel alloy

Ambrose Monell (1873 – May 2, 1921) was an American industrialist and military commander. He served as the first president of the International Nickel Company and was the namesake of the alloy known as Monel.

== Biography ==
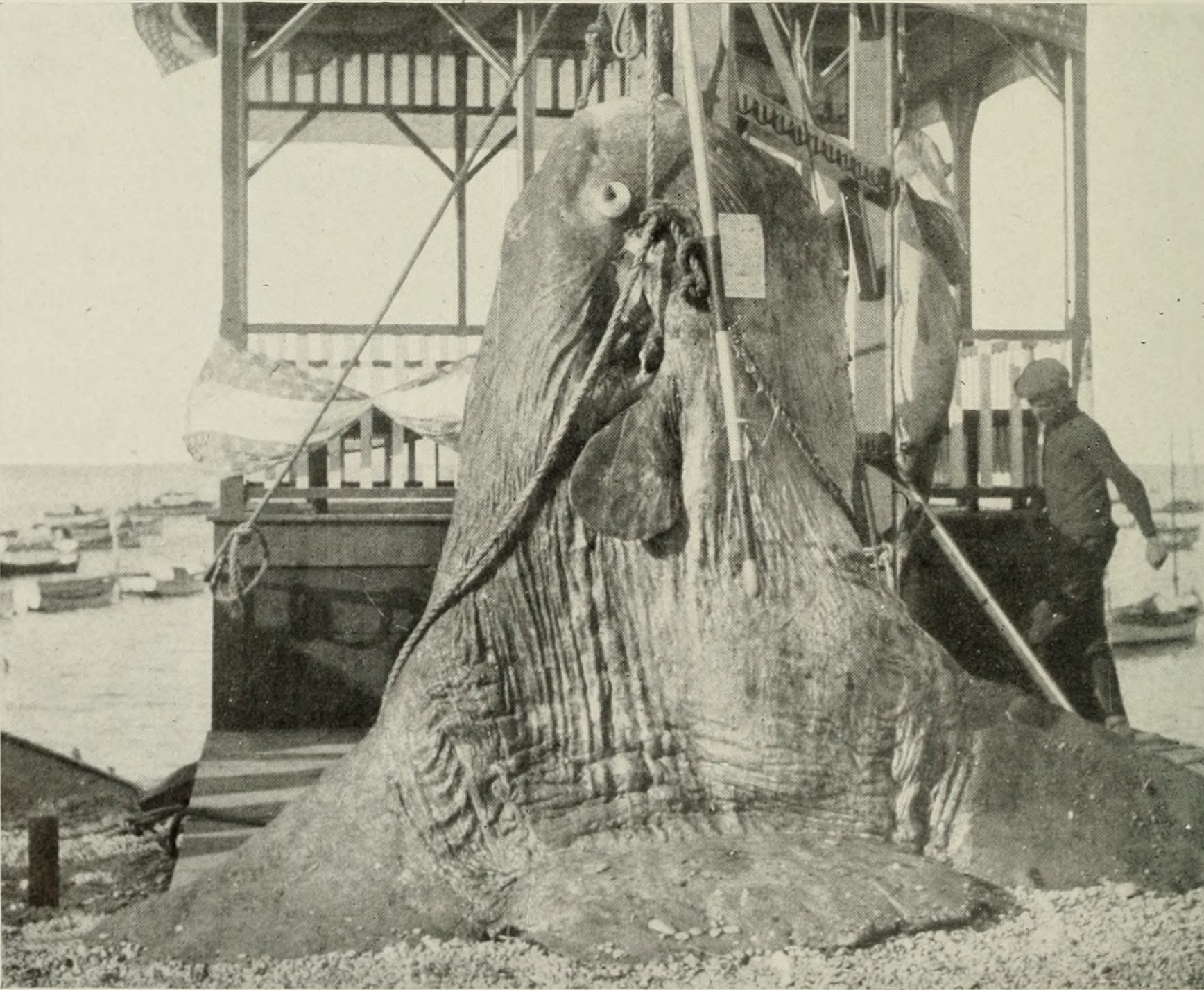
Monell was first to capture the 'elephant-eared' headfish, off Florida in 1916

Monell was born in 1873 to New York City Civil Court Justice Ambrose Monell. He was the grandson of New York Surrogate's Court Chief Justice Claudius L. Monell. Expected to be a lawyer, Monell entered instead Columbia School of Mines, earning his degree in 1896.

Monell became an instructor at the School of Mines upon graduation. He later joined Carnegie Steel Company as a metallurgical engineer and quickly rose through the ranks to become the company's Chief Metallurgical Engineer and assistant to the president by 1902. He was named one of the "Carnegie Boys" by Quentin R. Skrabec Jr. as having made an impact on American industry. That year, he was named president of the newly incorporated International Nickel Company.

Monell received a patent in 1906 on the manufacture of a nickel-copper alloy that became known as Monel alloy 400, setting off a century of inventions in the alloy industry. The alloy was named after Monell, but one l had to be truncated because at that time, family names were not allowed to be used as trademarks.

Monell was a director of a number of companies, including American International Corporation, Midvale Steel, International Motors Company, Liberty National Bank of New York, American Bank Note Company, and New York Shipbuilding Corporation, among others.

In 1917, Monell resigned from the company to become a colonel on the staff of the American aviation services in France. He died on May 2, 1921, at age 47. The New York Times speculated that his death had to do with "strain of war" as he never returned to active business life and spent time at a sanitarium in Beacon, New York, and one narrative has him become more politically active, in 1920 supporting the failed Republican candidacy of General Leonard Wood.

Monell was a member of the City Club of New York, the Racquet and Tennis Club, and the Downtown Club. He was a resident of Tuxedo Park, New York, at the time of his death.

== Legacy ==
Monell was identified by Harvard Business School as one of the "Great American Business Leaders of the 20th Century."

He left an estate of $15,000,000 (equivalent to $442 million in June 2022 dollars) at the time of death. His widow, Maude Monell Vetlesen, who later married Norwegian-American industrialist, G. Unger Vetlesen, established the Ambrose Monell Foundation in 1956.

His son, Edmund C. Monell, and grandson, Ambrose K. Monell, have continued to run the foundation, which has focused on health and environmental science research. The foundation has helped establish the Monell Chemical Senses Center in Philadelphia, the Monell Building for International Climate Research at Lamont–Doherty Earth Observatory at Columbia University, and the Ambrose Monell Award at Columbia School of Engineering and Applied Science. It has also supported the Carnegie Institution for Science and the Jefferson Scholars Foundation.
