= John Fairfield Thompson =

American metallurgist (1881–1968)

- Born: March 8, 1881; Portland, Maine, United States
- Died: July 13, 1968 (aged 87); New York City, New York
- Education: Columbia University (BSc 1903, PhD 1906)
- Occupation: Metallurgist
- Known for: Making nickel into an important industrial metals
- Spouse: Elizabeth Fisher Wheeler (m. 1911)

John Fairfield Thompson (March 8 1881 – July 13, 1968) was an American metallurgist who became President and later Chairman of Inco Limited.

== Early years and education ==
Thompson was born a Unitarian in Portland, Maine, in 1881, and attended Columbia University's School of Mines, receiving a Bachelor's degree in 1903 and a Ph.D. in 1906, for his work on Platinum-Silver alloys.

== Career ==
Thompson joined Inco in 1906. As Manager of Operations in 1921, he supervised the construction and initial operations of the Company's Huntington WV plant and rolling mill, founded for the production of high-nickel alloys. As of 2025, this plant continued part of the Special Metals Corporation.

In 1948, he approved funding for a project to develop the stainless steel kitchen sink.

Thompson became President of Inco in 1949 and Chairman in 1951. He relinquished his role as President in 1952.

Thompson, Manitoba was named in his honour because it was discovered in 1956 by the airborne magnetometer that he championed at INCO.

In 1958 he received the AIME Charles F. Rand Gold Memorial Medal, and honorary membership in the AIME in 1961.

Thompson published at least one book, in 1960: "For the years to come : a story of International Nickel of Canada".

== Publications ==
- Thompson, John F. (November 1934). "'Near Noble' Nickel". Scientific American. 151 (5): 229–232. Bibcode:1934SciAm.151..229T. doi:10.1038/scientificamerican1134-229. JSTOR 24968649.
- Thompson, John Fairfield; Beasley, Norman (1960). For the Years to Come: A Story of International Nickel of Canada. Toronto: Longmans, Green & Co.

== Personal life and Legacy ==
Thompson had a son (1920-1971) who bore the same name, with his wife. Junior rose to become President of the ASPCA.

He was awarded honorary degrees from Columbia University (1950), Queen's University at Kingston (1954) and Bowdoin College (1959) and Marshall College (1960). He is a commander in the Finnish Order of the White Rose. Recipient of the Thomas Egleston Medal, he is the subject of a photograph deposited at the Smithsonian Institution.

Thompson died in 1968.

In 2001 the Canadian Mining Hall of Fame inducted him, and in 2011 the Thompson Manitoba community clock was erected in his honour.
