= Roy Gordon =

Roy Gordon may refer to:

- Roy Gordon (Canadian chemist) (1898-1980), Canadian chemist
- Roy G. Gordon (born 1940), American chemist
- Roy Gordon (actor), actor in Titanic (1953 film)
- Roy Gordon (general), Australian Army general
- Roy Gordon (British footballer), British footballer in the 2008 Summer Paralympics
- Roy Gordon (American soccer), American college soccer coach

== See also ==
- Roy Gordon Grainger (born 1962), New Zealand physicist
