= Robert Means Thompson =

American naval officer and businessman

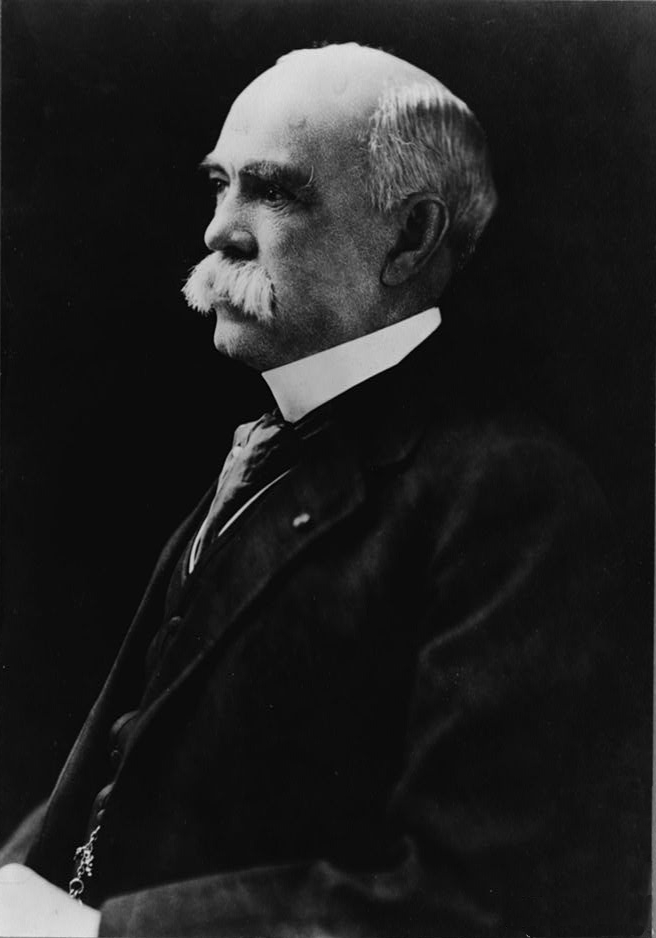
Robert Means Thompson, 1912

Robert Means Thompson (2 March 1849 – 5 September 1930) was a United States Navy officer, business magnate, philanthropist and a president of the American Olympic Association. He is the namesake of the destroyer USS Thompson (DD-627).

== Biography ==
He was born in Corsica, Pennsylvania, of Protestant Scotch and Irish descent to Judge of the Jefferson County PA court John Jamison Thompson and Agnes Kennedy.

=== Navy days ===
Thompson was appointed to the United States Naval Academy on 30 July 1864. Graduating tenth in the class of 1868, Thompson first went to sea in Contoocook in the West Indian Squadron. He later served in Franklin, Richmond, and Guard of the Mediterranean Squadron; as well as in USS Wachusett and at the Naval Torpedo Station, Newport, Rhode Island. Commissioned ensign on 19 April 1869, and promoted to master on 12 July 1870, he resigned from the Navy on 18 November 1871, to study law in his brother's office.

Later in life, he served as a military aide to the Governor of New Jersey with the rank of colonel. As a result, he was often referred to as "Colonel Thompson".

=== Lawyer ===
After he was admitted to the Pennsylvania Bar in 1872, he was still not satisfied with his legal training so he studied law at Harvard, graduating in 1874. Thompson subsequently practiced law in Boston and was a member of the Boston Common Council from 1876 to 1878.

=== Metallurgist ===
Thompson later became interested in mining and smelting enterprises, by which he earned his fortune. He became president of Orford Copper and Nickel Company, and it was at his refinery in Constable Hook New Jersey where he earned Canadian patent 44723A, "Method of obtaining sulphide of nickel".

A Boston entrepreneur named W. E. C. Eustis from Milton bought what was to become the Orford Nickel and Copper Company in 1865 in order to develop a mineral deposit discovered near Sherbrooke, Quebec, in Orford, Quebec. In March 1878 Eustis, Thompson, Robert Gilmour Leckie, Charles Carroll Colby and Walter W. Beckett established the Orford Nickel and Copper Company in Quebec. Thompson et al established the New Jersey refinery to process the ore from Orford there.

Orford Copper was the generatrix in 1900 of the Ontario Smelting Company and Orford Village which Thompson set up near what was to become known as Copper Cliff, at Cobalt Street.

In 1902 Orford Copper merged with the Canadian Copper Company and American Nickel Works, into the International Nickel Company of Canada, of which he served as chairman for at least a decade.

=== Residence ===
In 1907 he lived in a stone mansion at 1607 23rd Street NW in Washington, D.C. which was recently built by New York attorney Frank Ellis. The mansion is in the Beaux-arts style and was designed by the firm of Carrère and Hastings which designed many significant buildings of the era. Ellis sold the mansion to Roumania in 1921 and it has been used as its embassy ever since.

=== Philanthropy ===
He was an organizer of the Navy Athletic Association and the donor of the Thompson Cup, which is awarded to the member of the Navy Midshipmen who contributes most to the advancement of athletics at the Naval Academy. His interest in sport then extended to the Olympic Games, and was twice president of the American Olympic Association, once for the 1912 Summer Olympics, and again for the 1924 games. In 1912, he was also elected president of the New York Athletic Club. He also helped to organize the New York Chapter of the United States Naval Academy Alumni Association and served as its first president and as a trustee of the Naval Academy Alumni Association at Annapolis, Maryland.

Thompson was president of the Society of Naval Architects and Marine Engineers and president of the Navy League, and owner of the yacht Katrina. He also visited Japan at the invitation of the Japanese government and was awarded the Order of the Rising Sun, Second Class, by the Emperor. He also received the Order of Vasa by the government of Sweden, and the Cross of Commander, French Legion of Honor, by the French government.

Thompson became a companion of the Military Order of the Loyal Legion of the United States (MOLLUS) in 1874 through the Massachusetts commandery. He was active in MOLLUS affairs and was elected commander in chief 27 October 1927, and served in that capacity until his death.

He was also a companion of the Naval Order of the United States and was president of the Navy League of the United States.

He co-edited the Confidential Correspondence of Gustavus Vasa Fox, Assistant Secretary of the Navy for the Navy Historical Society.

== Personal life ==
Robert Means Thompson was married to Sarah Gibbs, daughter of Rhode Island governor, William C. Gibbs. They had one daughter, Sarah Gibbs Thompson. He maintained a summer residence at Southampton, Long Island and in winter he could be found in Washington DC.

He died while visiting his daughter and her husband, Stephen Hyatt Pell, at Fort Ticonderoga, New York, the commencement of the historic restored fortress being funded by his personal fortune in 1909. His memorial service was held at the chapel of the United States Naval Academy and he is buried with his wife in St. Mary's Episcopal Churchyard in Portsmouth, Rhode Island.
