= Henry S. Wingate =

American businessman (1905–1982)

Henry Smith Wingate
- Born: October 8, 1905; Talas, Turkey
- Died: November 25, 1982 (aged 77); Huntington, New York
- Education: Carleton College (BA '27); University of Michigan (JD '29)
- Occupation: Businessman
- Spouse: Ardis Adeline Swenson (m. 1928)

Henry Smith Wingate (October 8, 1905 – November 25, 1982) was an American businessman.

== Early life ==
Henry S. Wingate was born in Talas, Ottoman Empire, and raised in Northfield, Minnesota. He obtained a Bachelor of Arts from Carleton College in 1927 and a Juris Doctor degree from the University of Michigan in 1929.

== Career ==
He served Inco in 1930 while on the staff of its general counsel. He was named assistant secretary of that corporation in 1935. Wingate served as president of International Nickel Company's United States subsidiary from 1954 to 1960 and as chairman from 1960 to 1972. The company was later renamed Inco Ltd.

Wingate also held directorial positions at Canadian Pacific, American Radiator and Standard Sanitary Corporation, United States Steel Corporation, J.P. Morgan & Co., and Morgan Guaranty Trust Company.

Additionally, Wingate was active in charitable organizations in New York.
