= Monella =

Monella may refer to:

- 35316 Monella, an asteroid
- Monella (film), a 1998 Italian comedy-erotic film
