= Monel =

Solid-solution binary alloy of nickel and copper

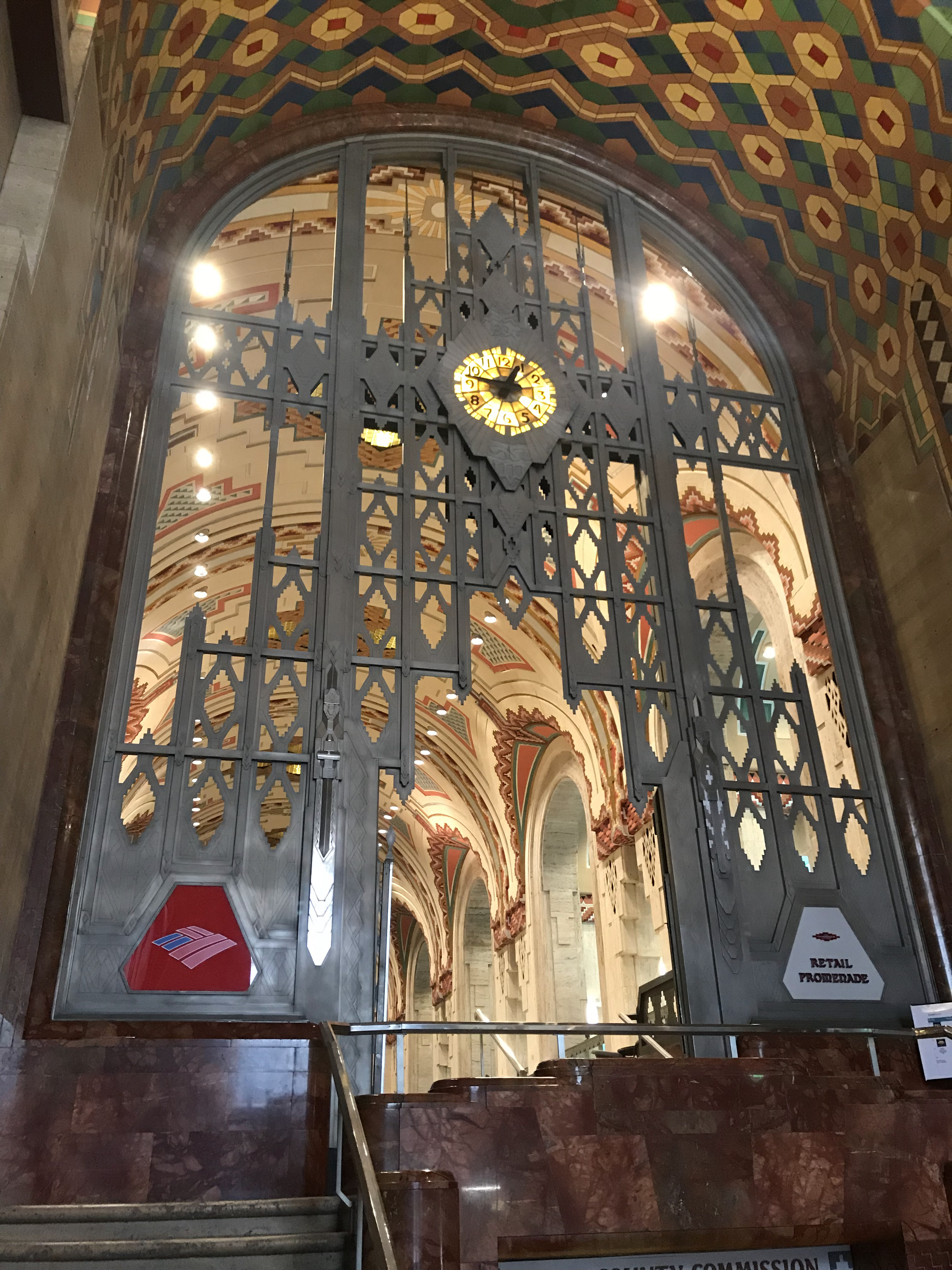
The Art Deco gate in the entrance hall of Detroit's Guardian Building is made from Monel.

Monel is a group of alloys of nickel (from 52 to 68%) and copper, with small amounts of iron, manganese, carbon, and silicon. Monel is not a cupronickel alloy because it has less than 60% copper.

Stronger than pure nickel, Monel alloys are resistant to corrosion by many aggressive agents, including rapidly flowing seawater. They can be fabricated readily by hot- and cold-working, machining, and welding.

Monel was created in 1905 by the American industrialist Robert Crooks Stanley at the International Nickel Company (Inco) and patented in 1906.

It was named after Ambrose Monell, the president of Inco, with an L dropped, because family names were not allowed as trademarks. The trademark was registered in May 1921, and now belongs to the Special Metals Corporation, the successor of Inco and Huntington Alloys Corporation.

As an expensive alloy, it is used in applications where it cannot be replaced with cheaper alternatives. For example, in 2015, Monel pipe was more than three times as expensive as carbon steel pipe.

== Properties ==
Monel is a solid-solution binary alloy. As nickel and copper are mutually soluble in all proportions, it is a single-phase alloy. Compared to steel, Monel is very difficult to machine as it work-hardens very quickly. It needs to be turned and worked at slow speeds and low feed rates. It is resistant to corrosion and acids, and some alloys can withstand a fire in pure oxygen. It is commonly used in applications with highly corrosive conditions. Small additions of aluminium and titanium form a superalloy (K-500) with the same corrosion resistance but with much greater strength due to gamma prime formation on aging. Monel is typically much more expensive than stainless steel.

Monel alloy 400 has a specific gravity of 8.80, a melting range of 1300–1350 °C, an electrical conductivity of approximately 34% IACS, and (in the annealed state) a hardness of 65 Rockwell B. Monel alloy 400 is notable for its toughness, which is maintained over a considerable range of temperatures.

Monel alloy 400 has excellent mechanical properties at subzero temperatures. Strength and hardness increase with only slight impairment of ductility or impact resistance. The alloy does not undergo a ductile-to-brittle transition even when cooled to the temperature of liquid hydrogen. This is in marked contrast to many ferrous materials which are brittle at low temperatures despite their increased strength.

== Uses ==
=== Aerospace applications ===
In the 1960s, Monel metal found bulk uses in aircraft construction, especially in making the frames and skins of experimental rocket planes, such as the North American X-15, to resist the great heat generated by aerodynamic friction during extremely high speed flight. Monel metal retains its strength at very high temperatures, allowing it to maintain its shape at high atmospheric flight speeds, a trade-off against the increased weight of the parts due to Monel's high density.

Monel is used for safety wiring in aircraft maintenance to ensure that fasteners cannot come undone, usually in high-temperature areas; stainless wire is used in other areas for economy. In addition some fasteners used are made from the alloy.

=== Oil production and refining ===
Monel is used in the section of alkylation units in direct contact with concentrated hydrofluoric acid. Monel offers exceptional resistance to hydrofluoric acid in all concentrations up to the boiling point. It is perhaps the most resistant of all commonly used engineering alloys. The alloy is also resistant to many forms of sulfuric and hydrochloric acids under reducing conditions.

=== Marine applications ===
Monel's corrosion resistance makes it ideal in applications such as piping systems, pump shafts, seawater valves, trolling wire, and strainer baskets. Some alloys are completely non-magnetic and are used for anchor cable aboard minesweepers or in housings for magnetic-field measurement equipment. In recreational boating, Monel is used for wire to seize shackles for anchor ropes, for water and fuel tanks, and for underwater applications. It is also used for propeller shafts and for keel bolts. On the popular Hobiecat sailboats, Monel rivets are used where strength is needed but stainless steel cannot be used due to corrosion that would result from stainless steel being in contact with the aluminum mast, boom, and frame of the boat in a saltwater environment.

Because of the problem of electrolytic action in salt water (also known as Galvanic corrosion), in shipbuilding Monel must be carefully insulated from other metals such as steel. The New York Times on August 12, 1915 published an article about a 215-foot (66 m) yacht, "the first ship that has ever been built with an entirely Monel hull," that "went to pieces" in just six weeks and had to be scrapped, "on account of the disintegration of her bottom by electrical action." The yacht's steel skeleton deteriorated due to electrolytic interaction with the Monel.

In seabird research, and bird banding or ringing in particular, Monel has been used to make bird bands or rings for many species, such as albatrosses, that live in a corrosive sea water environment. In a parallel use, Monel was also used to make flipper tags for use in sea turtle research before the manufacturers switched to using Inconel.

=== Musical instruments ===
Monel is used as the material for valve pistons or rotors in some higher-quality musical instruments such as trumpets, tubas and French horns. RotoSound introduced the use of Monel for electric bass strings in 1962, and these strings have been used by numerous artists, including Steve Harris of Iron Maiden, The Who, Sting, John Deacon, John Paul Jones and the late Chris Squire. Monel was in use in the early 1930s by other musical string manufacturers, such as Gibson Guitar Corporation, who continue to offer them for mandolin as the Sam Bush signature set. C. F. Martin & Company uses Monel for their Martin Retro acoustic guitar strings and mandolin strings. The Pyramid string factory (Germany) produces 'Monel classics' electric guitar strings, wound on a round core. In 2017, D'Addario string company released a line of violin and mandolin strings using a Monel winding on the D and G string.

=== Other ===
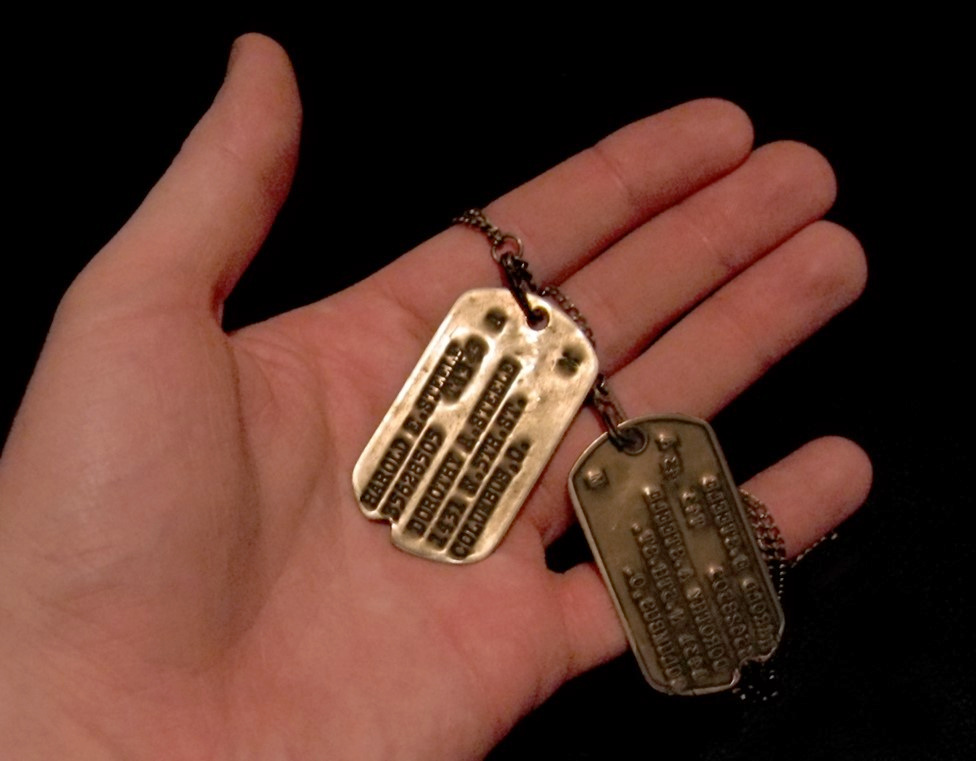
Identification tags made from Monel

Good resistance against corrosion by acids and oxygen makes Monel a good material for the chemical industry. Even corrosive fluorides can be handled within Monel apparatus; this was done in an extensive way in the enrichment of uranium in the Oak Ridge Gaseous Diffusion Plant. Here most of the larger-diameter tubing for the uranium hexafluoride was made from Monel. Regulators for reactive cylinder gases like hydrogen chloride form another example, where PTFE is not a suitable option when high delivery pressures are required. These will sometimes include a Monel manifold and taps prior to the regulator that allow the regulator to be flushed with a dry, inert gas after use to further protect the equipment.

In the early 20th century, when steam power was widely used, Monel was advertised as being desirable for use in superheated steam systems. During the world wars, Monel was used for US military dog tags.

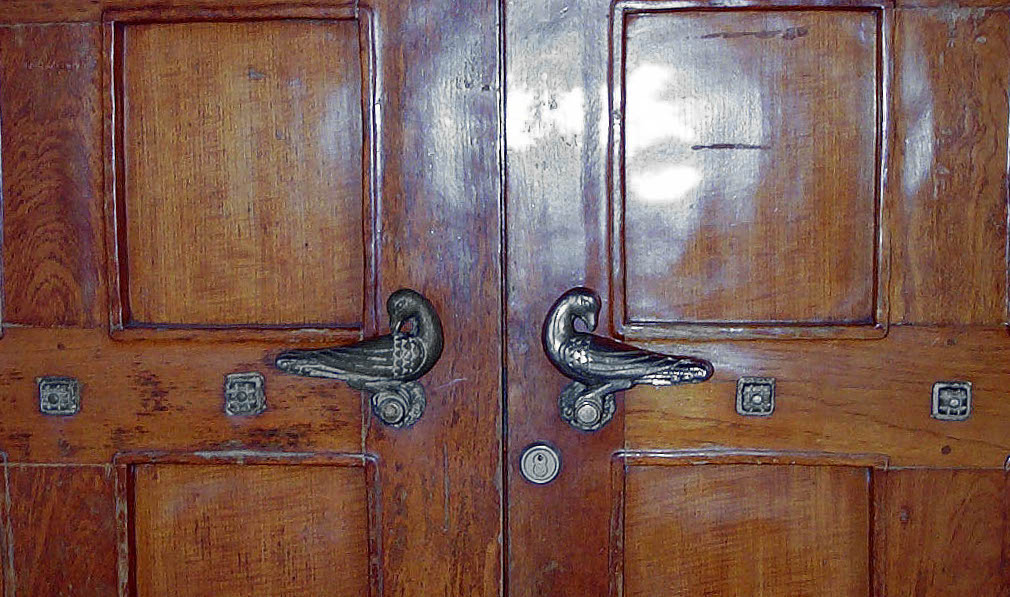
Monel doorknobs in the Bryn Athyn Cathedral

Monel is often used for kitchen sinks and in the frames of eyeglasses. It has also been used for firebox stays in fire-tube boilers.

Parts of the Clock of the Long Now, which is intended to run for 10,000 years, are made from Monel because of the corrosion resistance without the use of precious metals.

Monel was used for much of the exposed metal used in the interior of the Bryn Athyn Cathedral in Pennsylvania, religious seat of the General Church of the New Jerusalem. This included large decorative screens, doorknobs, etc. Monel also has been used as roofing material in buildings such as the original Pennsylvania Station in New York City.

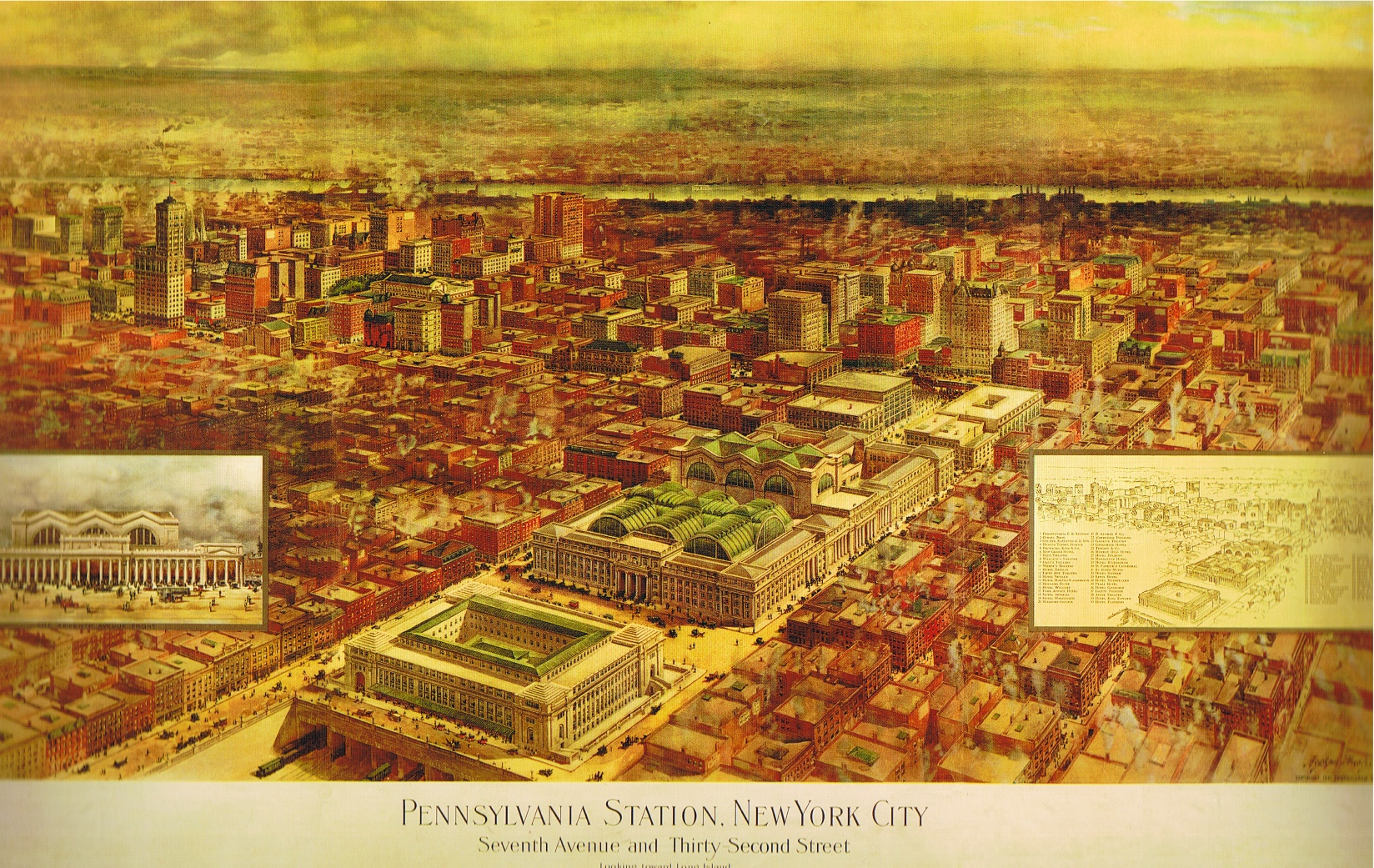
The greenish roof of New York's Pennsylvania Station was made from Monel.

The 1991–1996 Acura (Honda) NSX came with a key made of Monel.

Oilfield applications include using Monel drill collars. Instruments which measure the Earth's magnetic field to obtain a direction are placed in a non-magnetic collar which isolates them from the magnetic pull of drilling tools located above and below the non-magnetic collars. Monel is now rarely used, usually replaced by non-magnetic stainless steels.

Monel is also used as a protective binding material on the outside of western style stirrups.

Monel is used by Arrow Fastener Co., Inc. for rustproof T50 staples.

Monel has also been used in Kelvinator refrigerators.

Monel was used in the Baby Alice Thumb Guard, a 1930s-era anti-thumb-sucking device.

Monel is used in motion picture film processing. Monel staple splices are ideal for resisting corrosion from use in continuous-run photochemical tanks.

Monel was latterly widely used to manufacture firebox stays in steam locomotive boilers.

== Alloys ==
Monel is often traded under the ISO standards 6208 (plate, sheet and strip) 9723 (bars) 9724 (wire) 9725 (forgings) and the DIN 17751 (pipes and tubes).

Trade name	ASTM/AISI alloy type	UNS	%Cu	%Al	%Ti	%Fe	%Mn	%Si	%Ni
Monel 400	B 127, B 164	N04400	28–34			2.5 max	2.0 max	0.5 max	63 min
Monel 401		N04401	28–34			2.5 max	2.0 max		63 min
Monel 404		N04404	Rem	0.05 max		0.5 max	0.1 max	0.1 max	52–57
Monel K-500	B 865	N05500	27–33	2.3–3.15	0.35–0.85	2.0 max	1.5 max	0.5 max	63 min
Monel 405	B 164	N04405	28–34			2.5 max	2.0 max	0.5 max	63 min

=== Monel 400 ===
Monel 400 shows high strength and excellent corrosion resistance in a range of acidic and alkaline environments and is especially suitable for reducing conditions. It also has good ductility and thermal conductivity. Monel 400 typically finds application in marine engineering, chemical and hydrocarbon processing, heat exchangers, valves, and pumps. It is covered by the following standards: BS 3075, 3076 NA 13, DTD 204B and ASTM B164.

Large use of Monel 400 is made in alkylation units, namely in the reacting section in contact with concentrated hydrofluoric acid.

=== Monel 401 ===
This alloy is designed for use in specialized electric and electronic applications. Alloy 401 is readily autogenously welded by the gas-tungsten-arc process. Resistance welding is a very satisfactory method for joining the material. It also exhibits good brazing characteristics. It is covered by standard UNS N04401.

=== Monel 404 ===
Monel 404 alloy is used primarily in specialized electrical and electronic applications. The composition of Monel 404 is carefully adjusted to provide a very low Curie temperature, low permeability, and good brazing characteristics.

Monel 404 can be welded using common welding techniques and forged but cannot be hot worked. Cold working may be done using standard tooling and soft die materials for better finish. It is covered by standards UNS N04404 and ASTM F96. Monel 404 is used in capsules for transistors and ceramic to metal seals and other things.

=== Monel 405 ===
Monel alloy 405, also known as Monel R405, is the free-machining grade of alloy 400. The nickel, carbon, manganese, iron, silicon & copper percent remains the same as alloy 400, but the sulfur is increased from 0.024 max to 0.025-0.060%. Alloy 405 is used chiefly for automatic screw machine stock and is not generally recommended for other applications. The nickel–copper sulfides resulting from the sulfur in its composition act as chip breakers, but because of these inclusions the surface finish of the alloy is not as smooth as that of alloy 400. Monel 405 is designated UNS N04405 and is covered by ASME SB-164, ASTM B-164, Federal QQ-N-281, SAE AMS 4674 & 7234, Military MIL-N-894, and NACE MR-01-75.

=== Monel 450 ===
This alloy exhibits good fatigue strength and has relatively high thermal conductivity. It is used for seawater condensers, condenser plates, distiller tubes, evaporator and heat exchanger tubes, and saltwater piping.

=== Monel K-500 ===
Monel K-500 combines the excellent corrosion resistance characteristic of Monel alloy 400 with the added advantages of greater strength and hardness. The increased properties are obtained by adding aluminum and titanium to the nickel–copper base, and by heating under controlled conditions so that submicroscopic particles of Ni_{3} (Ti, Al) are precipitated throughout the matrix.

The corrosion resistance of Monel alloy K-500 is substantially equivalent to that of alloy 400 except that, when in the age-hardened condition, alloy K-500 has a greater tendency toward stress-corrosion cracking in some environments. Monel alloy K-500 has been found to be resistant to a sour-gas environment. The combination of very low corrosion rates in high-velocity sea water and high strength make alloy K-500 particularly suitable for shafts of centrifugal pumps in marine service. In stagnant or slow-moving sea water, fouling may occur followed by pitting, but this pitting slows down after a fairly rapid initial attack.

Typical applications for alloy K-500 are pump shafts and impellers, doctor blades and scrapers, and oil-well drill collars, instruments, and electronic components. It is also used in components for power plants, such as steam-turbine blades, heat exchangers, and condenser tubes. In the marine industry, it is utilized in components for marine hardware, propeller shafts, pump shafts and seawater valves exposed to harsh marine environments.

=== Monel 502 ===
Monel 502 is a nickel–copper alloy and its UNS no is N05502. This grade also has good creep and oxidation resistance. Monel 502 can be formed in different shapes, and can be machined similar to austenitic stainless steels.

== See also ==
- Hastelloy
- Inconel
