= William McAdam (merchant) =

Scottish-American merchant and businessman

President of the Saint Andrew's Society of the State of New York
- In office 1772–1773
- Preceded by: John Watts
- Succeeded by: Thomas Drummond

Personal details
- Born: c. 1725 Ayr, Scotland
- Died: October 1, 1779 (aged 53–54) New York City, U.S.
- Spouse: Ann Dey (m. 1764)
- Relations: John Loudon McAdam (nephew)

William McAdam (c. 1725 – October 1, 1779) was a Scottish-American merchant and businessman who served as the president of the Saint Andrew's Society of the State of New York.

== Early life ==
McAdam was born in Ayr, Scotland, around 1725. He was a son of James McAdam and Margaret (née Reid) McAdam. His brother James McAdam, Baron of Waterhead, was one of the founders of the first bank in Ayr in 1763.

He was a direct descendant of Gilbert McAdam, "a zealous covenantor" who was killed by the Royalists in 1685 while "attending a prayer-meeting at Kirkmichael in Ayrshire."

== Career ==
Early in his life, he came to America and established a trading and merchant business. By 1766, he had a warehouse on Smith Street, near the New Dutch Church, where he sold "Iron-bound Butts & Puncheons, genuine Batavia Arrack in Bottles, Frontinjack, Priniack & Madeira, etc." During the height of his career, he brought his nephew John Loudon McAdam (son of brother James) over to New York to work as a merchant and prize agent in his counting house. His nephew later returned to Scotland and became a well-known civil engineer and road-builder who invented the process known as "macadamisation", an economical method of constructing roads.

During the American Revolution, McAdam was one of fifty-one committee of correspondence members that met in May 1774 at the Fraunces Tavern "in order to consult on measures proper to be pursued on the present critical and important situation" due to the British announcement that the port of Boston would be closed under the Boston Port Act. However, McAdam, who was in "sympathy with the Crown," took steps to regulate the revival of trade in the Port of New York in 1779. After the Patriots defeated the British, his property was confiscated and he lost practically all of his fortune.

== Personal life ==
On December 12, 1764, McAdam was married to Ann Dey, daughter of Dirck Dey and Jane Dey. Her father was a Dutch born planter, purchased 600 acres of land in Preakness Valley, now Wayne Township, and her brother, Col. Theunis Dey, built the Dey Mansion there in the 1770s.

McAdam was a founder and original member of the New York Chamber of Commerce, serving as its treasurer and vice president. He was also elected a member of the Saint Andrew's Society of the State of New York in 1761 and served as Assistant from 1765 to 1766, vice-president from 1771 to 1772 and president from 1772 to 1773.

McAdam died on October 1, 1779, in New York City.
