= Preakness Valley =

Coordinates: 40.917358°N 74.233923°W

Preakness Valley and Golf Course
- Type: County park
- Location: Wayne in New Jersey, United States
- Area: 377 acres (153 ha)
- Operated by: Passaic County Parks & Recreation
- Website: Official website

Preakness Valley Park and Golf Course is located in Wayne Township and Totowa Borough, New Jersey, United States, along Totowa Road (County Road 644) and Riverview Drive (County Road 640). Of the total 377 acres in the park, 298 acres are located in Wayne and 79 are located in Totowa. The park contains a public 36 hole golf course, split into 2 18-hole layouts. Made public in 1931, this full service course is considered the first public golf course in Passaic County. It has a clubhouse, caddy house, practice facilities, and on site maintenance facilities.

Also located on the park is Dey Mansion, a historical site famous for being George Washington's headquarters twice during the American Revolutionary War. The mansion was constructed around 1770, and has been county owned since 1930. NJ Transit Bus Route 197 provides service to this park.
