= John Loudon McAdam =

Scottish engineer and road-builder (1756–1836)

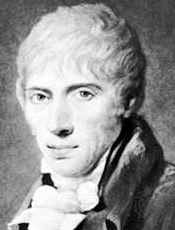
- Engraving of McAdam at the British Museum
- Born: 23 September 1756; Ayr, Scotland
- Died: 26 November 1836 (aged 80); Moffat, Dumfriesshire, Scotland
- Citizenship: Scottish
- Engineering career
- Significant advance: "Macadamisation"

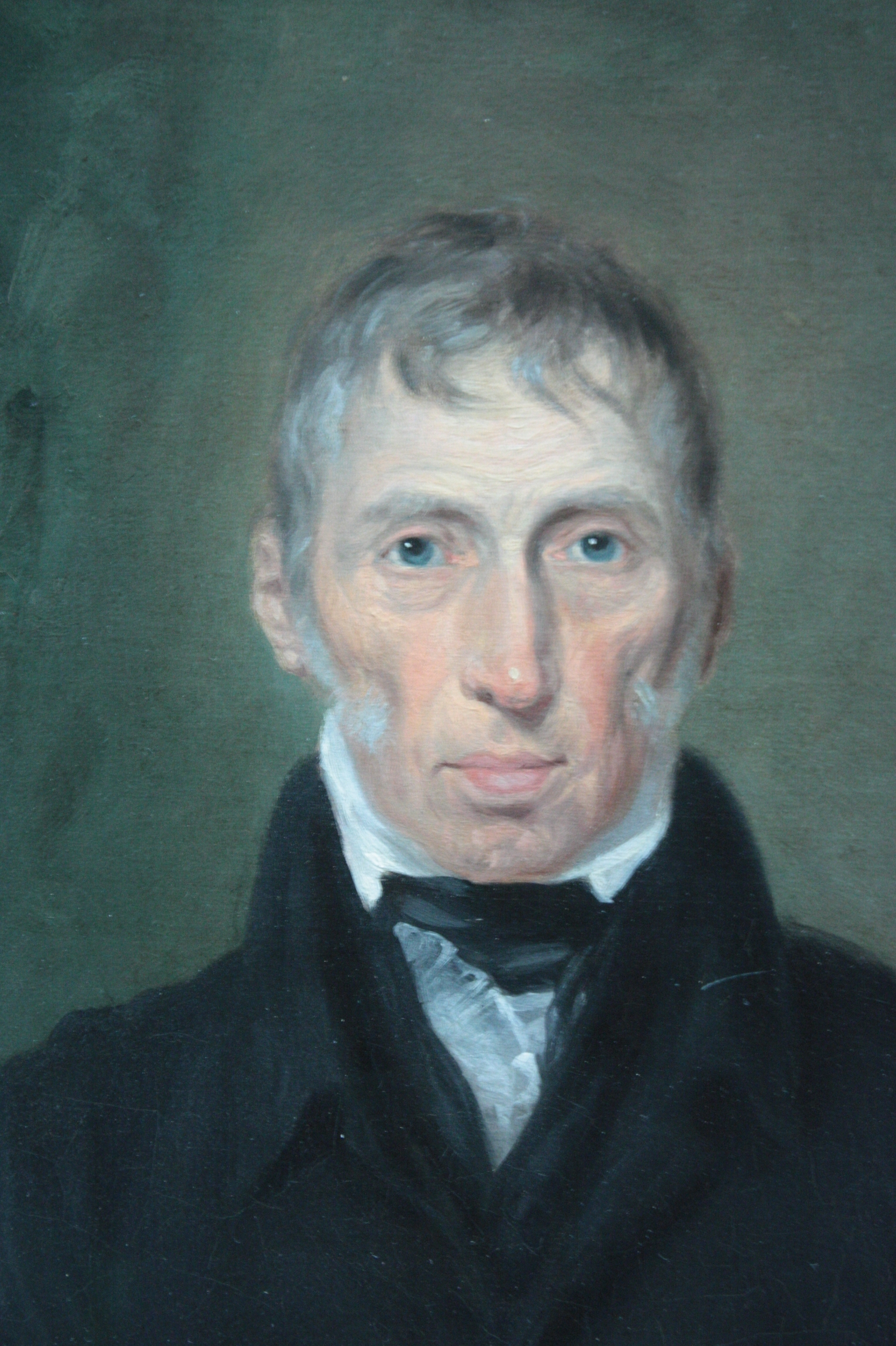
John Loudon McAdam, 1830, National Gallery, London

John Loudon McAdam (23 September 1756 – 26 November 1836) was a Scottish civil engineer and road-builder. He invented a new process, "macadamisation", for building roads with a smooth hard surface, using controlled materials of mixed particle size and predetermined structure, that would be more durable and less muddy than soil-based tracks.

Modern road construction still reflects McAdam's influence. Of subsequent improvements, the most significant was the introduction of tar (originally coal tar) to bind the road surface's stones together, "tarmac" (for Tar Macadam.)

== Early life ==
McAdam was born in Ayr, Scotland. He was the youngest of ten children and second son of the Baron of Waterhead. He moved to Lagwine at Carsphairn when still a child to live with his grandparents. The family name was traditionally McGregor, but was changed to McAdam (claiming descent from the Biblical Adam) for political reasons in James VI's reign.

He moved to New York in 1770 and, as a merchant and prize agent during the American Revolution, made his fortune working at his uncle William McAdam's counting house. He returned to Scotland in 1783 and purchased an estate at Sauchrie, Ayrshire.

Besides taking part in local Ayrshire affairs, McAdam operated the Kaims Colliery. The colliery supplied coal to the British Tar Company, of Archibald Cochrane, 9th Earl of Dundonald, and partners in the coal tar trade; McAdam ran its kilns. He further was involved in the ironworks at Muirkirk, which was a customer for the coke byproduct of the tar business. This business connection is the only direct relationship of McAdam and tar.

== Career ==
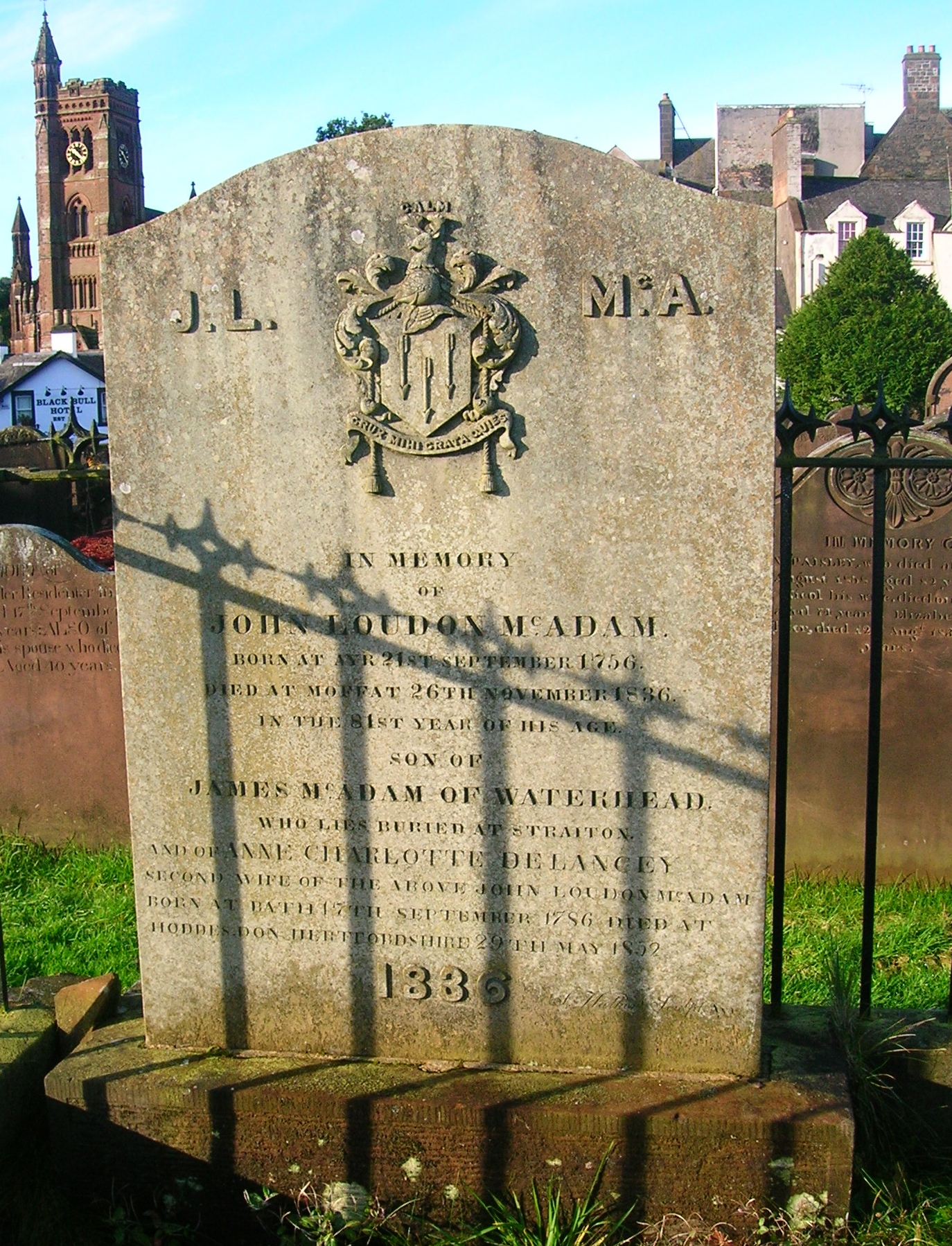
Memorial stone to John Loudon McAdam

McAdam became a trustee of the Ayrshire Turnpike in 1783 and became increasingly involved with day-to-day road construction over the next 10 years. In 1802 he moved to Bristol, England and he became general surveyor for the Bristol Corporation in 1804. He put forward his ideas in evidence to Parliamentary enquiries in 1810, 1819 and 1823. In two treatises written in 1816 and 1819 (Remarks on the Present System of Road-Making and Practical Essay on the Scientific Repair and Preservation of Roads) he argued that roads needed to be raised above the surrounding ground and constructed from layered rocks and gravel in a systematic manner.

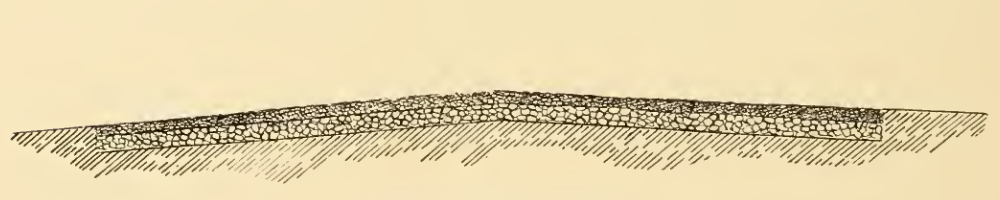
Layers of macadam roads

McAdam had also been appointed surveyor to the Bristol Turnpike Trust in 1816, where he decided to remake the roads under his care with crushed stone bound with gravel on a firm base of large stones. A camber, making the road slightly convex, ensured rainwater rapidly drained off the road rather than penetrate and damage the road's foundations. This construction method, the greatest advance in road construction since Roman times, became known as "macadamisation", or, more simply, "macadam".

The macadam method spread very quickly across the world. The first macadam road in North America, the National Road, was completed in the 1830s and most of the main roads in Europe were subject to the McAdam process by the end of the nineteenth century.

Although McAdam was paid £5,000 for his Bristol Turnpike Trust work and made "Surveyor-General of Metropolitan Roads" in 1820, professional jealousy cut a £5,000 grant for expenses from the Parliament of the United Kingdom to £2,000 in 1827. His efficient road-building and management work had revealed the corruption and abuse of road tolls by unscrupulous turnpike trusts, many of which were run at a deliberate loss despite high toll receipts.

== Death and descendants ==
McAdam died in Moffat, Dumfriesshire, while returning to his home in Hoddesdon, Hertfordshire, from his annual summer visit to Scotland. His three sons, and in turn four grandsons, followed him into the profession and assisted with the management of turnpike trusts around the country. His second surviving son, James Nicoll McAdam, the "Colossus of Roads", was knighted for managing turnpike trusts: a knighthood, it is said, previously offered to his father but declined.

== Bibliography ==
- Devereux, Roy. John Loudon McAdam: Chapters in the History of Highways. (Oxford University Press, 1936)
- Fay, C. R. "John Loudon McAdam: Chapters in the History of Highways." The Economic Journal 47.Supplement_1 (1937): 465-467.
- Lansberry, H. C. F. "James McAdam and the St. Albans Turnpike Trust." The Journal of Transport History 2 (1965): 120-127.
- Spiro Jr, Robert H. "John Loudon McAdam and the Metropolis Turnpike Trust." Journal of Transport History 4 (1956): 207-213.
  - Spiro, R. H. "John Loudon McAdam, colossus of roads" (PhD dissertation, University of Edinburgh; ProQuest Dissertations & Theses, 1950. U457763).
