= Vikki Ziegler =

American lawyer and author

- Born: New York City
- Education: JD
- Alma mater: Quinnipiac University School of Law; University of Rhode Island
- Occupations: Divorce attorney and author
- Works: The Pre-marital Planner: A Complete Legal Guide to a Perfect Marriage
- Television: Untying the Knot
- Board member of: Supreme Court of New Jersey to the District XI Ethics Committee for Passaic County
- Awards: Outstanding Podcast award from the 41st Annual Gracie Awards

Vikki Ziegler is an American lawyer and author. Her book The Pre-marital Planner: A Complete Legal Guide to a Perfect Marriage was published in 2012, and from 2014 to 2016 she was the focus of the reality television show Untying the Knot. She practices matrimonial law and is a founding partner in the firm Ziegler and Zemsky LLC. As a business person, she has founded several divorce related websites.

== Early life ==
Vikki Ziegler was born in Manhattan and raised in Wayne, New Jersey by South African parents. Ziegler's parents divorced in 1985 when she was twelve years old, and reportedly, she argued for (and convinced) her parents to seek joint custody during the proceedings. The experience gave her the motivation to become a divorce attorney herself when she became an adult. She attended the Gloria Frances School of Performing Arts and graduated from Wayne Hills High School in 1990. She worked as a fashion model while attending university, and graduated from the University of Rhode Island, where she studied Spanish, Sociology, and Political Science, as well as Quinnipiac University School of Law, after first attending Bridgeport Law. Following law school, she clerked for Justice Michael A. Diamond of the Family Division of the Superior Court in Passaic County.

== Legal career ==
As a lawyer, Ziegler worked for Walder, Hayden & Brogan during the mid-2000s, where among other cases she was the attorney for the divorce of Pro Football Hall of Fame inductee Michael Strahan. Ziegler is now a founding partner and attorney with the firm Ziegler and Zemsky, a law firm specializing in marital law. She is also an adjunct professor at Fordham Law School, where she teaches about prenuptial agreements and same-sex marriage. Ziegler is barred in New York, New Jersey, and Washington D.C. She was also appointed to the Supreme Court of New Jersey to the District XI Ethics Committee for Passaic County.

== Television ==
Early in her career she appeared as a commentator on E!, MSNBC, CNN, Fox Business Network, and Fox News during discussions of celebrity divorce cases. She has also appeared on daytime television shows such as Dr. Drew and The Wendy Williams Show, as well as the 30 for 30 film "Broke" on ESPN. In 2014 she began hosting the Bravo reality television show Untying the Knot. The six half-hour episodes track Ziegler handling divorce cases, and includes her consultations with appraisal experts Mark and Michael Millea when items require auctioning. The series was renewed in November 2014, and expanded to a full hour format for the second season.

== Writings ==
In 2008, she began work on a guide for divorce entitled The All Star Divorce. She then published the book The Pre-marital Planner: A Complete Legal Guide to a Perfect Marriage in 2012, which includes the discussion of how to approach a prenuptial agreement as a couple before marriage. The All Star Divorce is slated to be her second non-fiction book.

== Other businesses ==
Ziegler is the founded of DivorceDating.com, a match-making website for divorcees, and a celebrity gossip website HookupsAndBreakups.com. Both were developed as a part of an effort to life "the stigma of divorce". She is also the creator of the "Lavish by Vikki Ziegler" brand of hair perfume.

== Recognition ==
Ziegler was named one of the 40 lawyers under 40 by the New Jersey Law Journal in 2006. In 2016 she received the Outstanding Podcast award at the 41st Annual Gracie Award.
