= Wayne, New Jersey =

Township in Passaic County, New Jersey, US

- Township
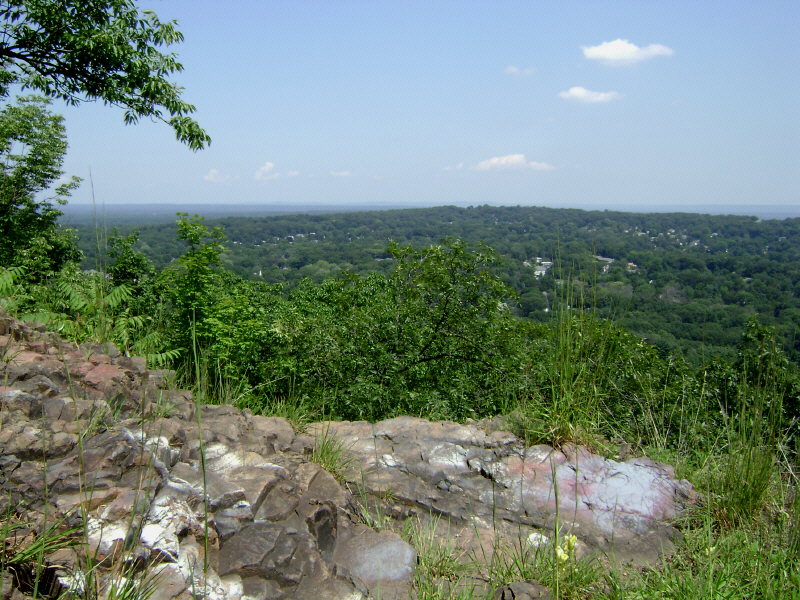
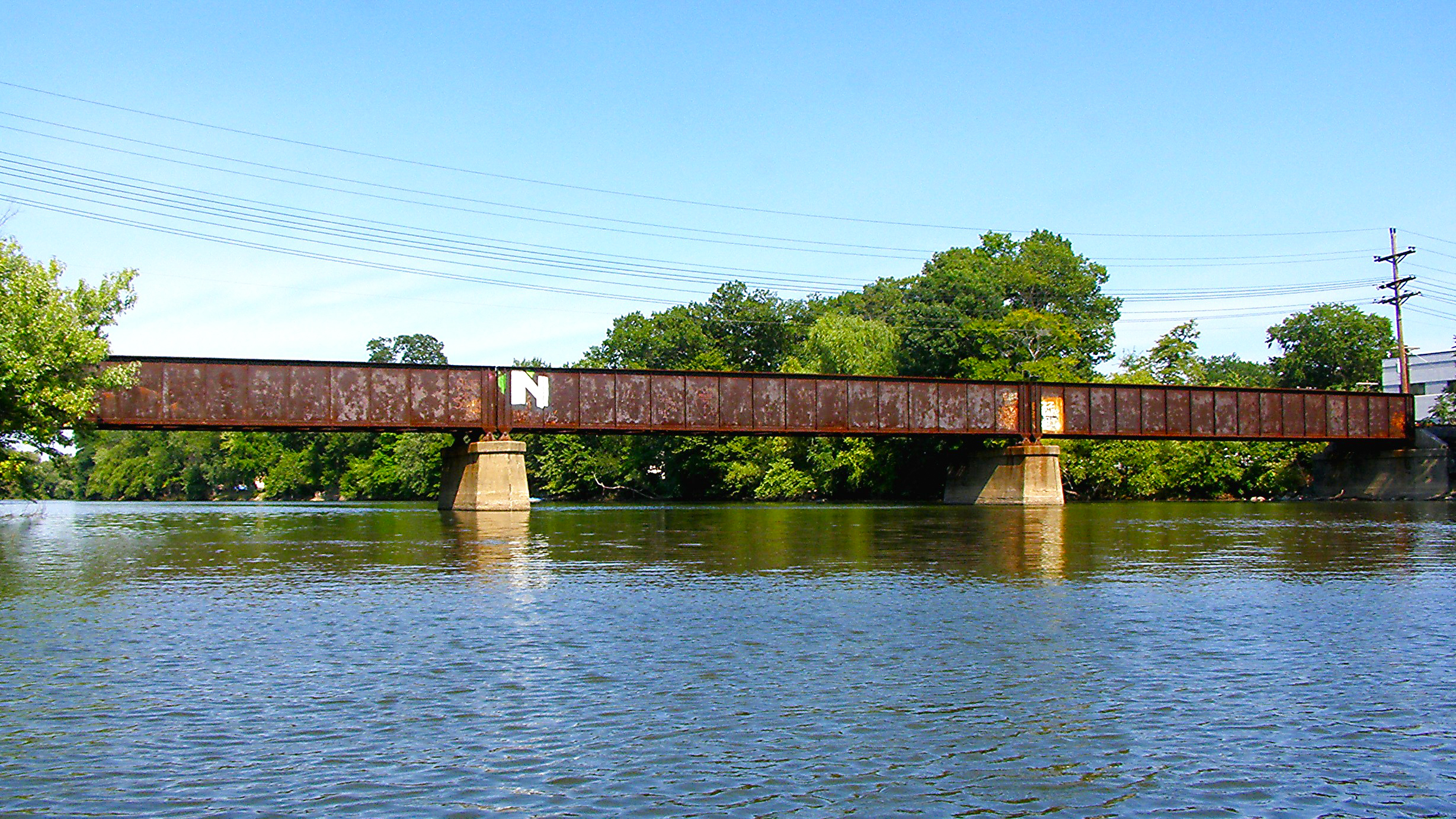
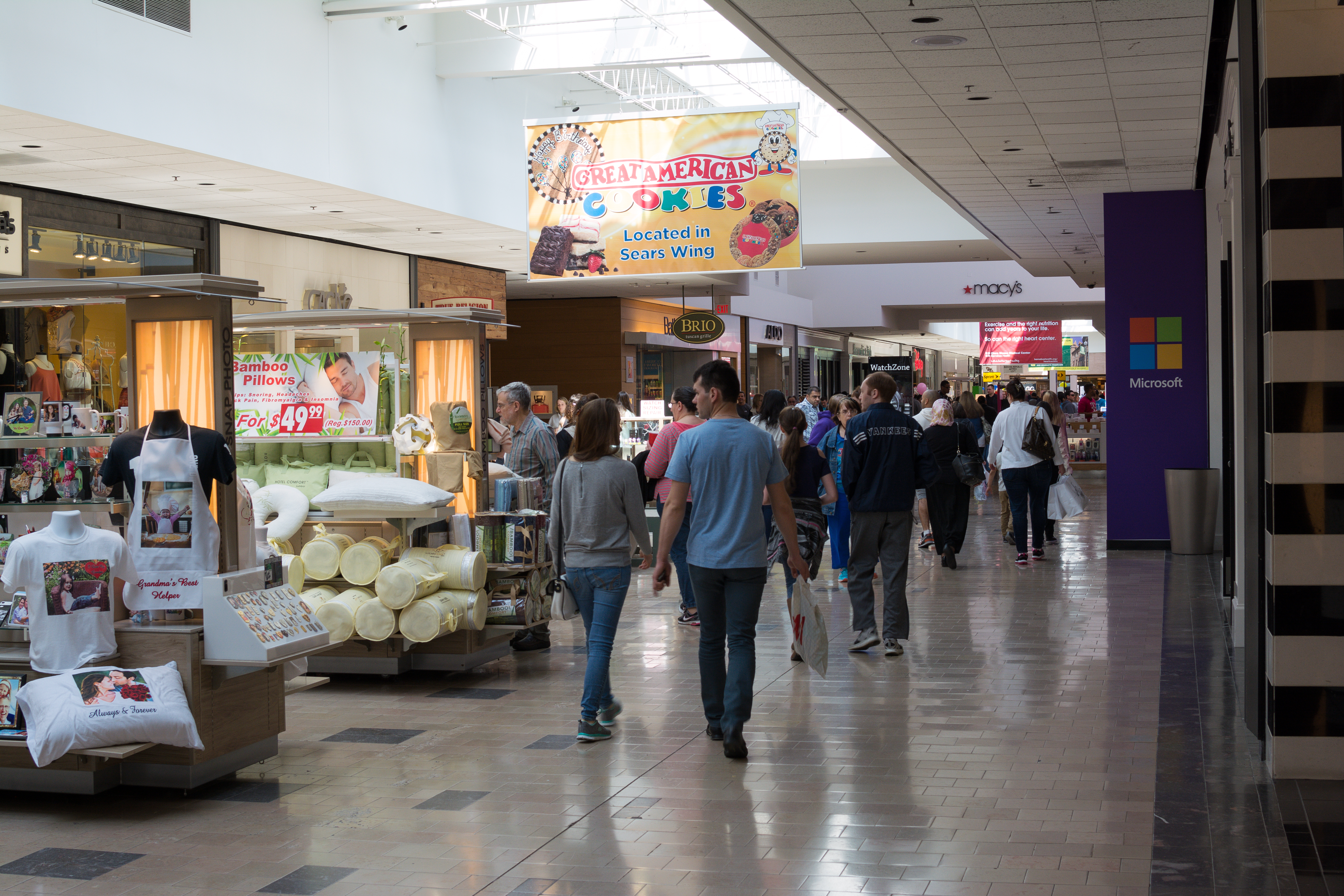
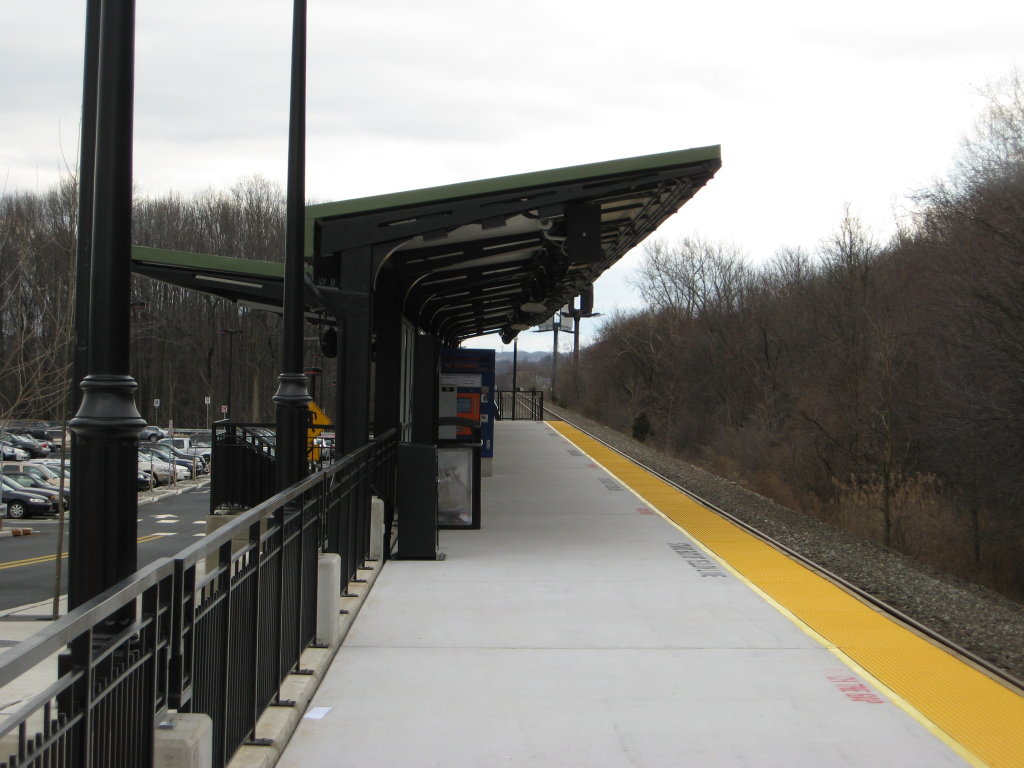
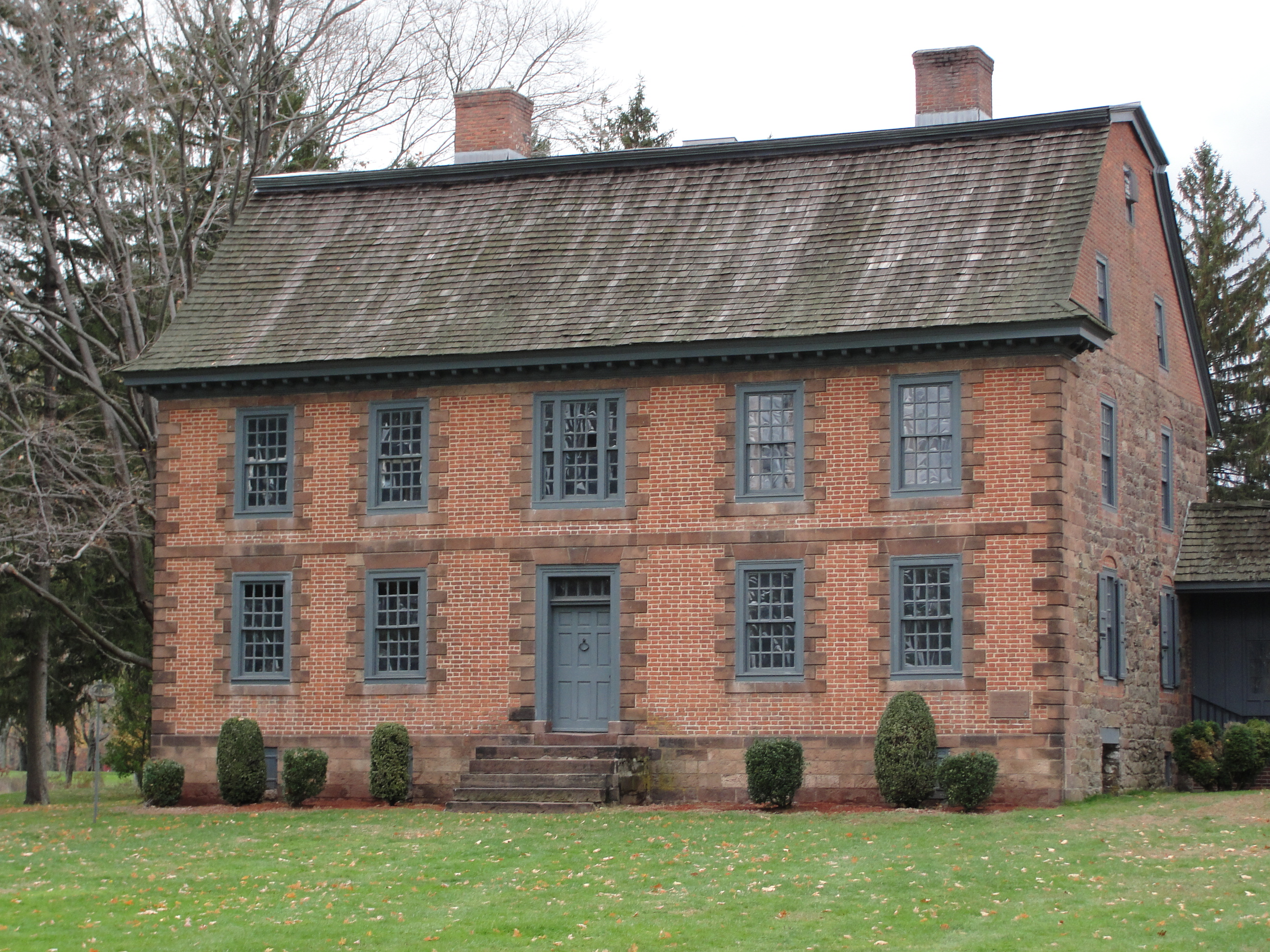
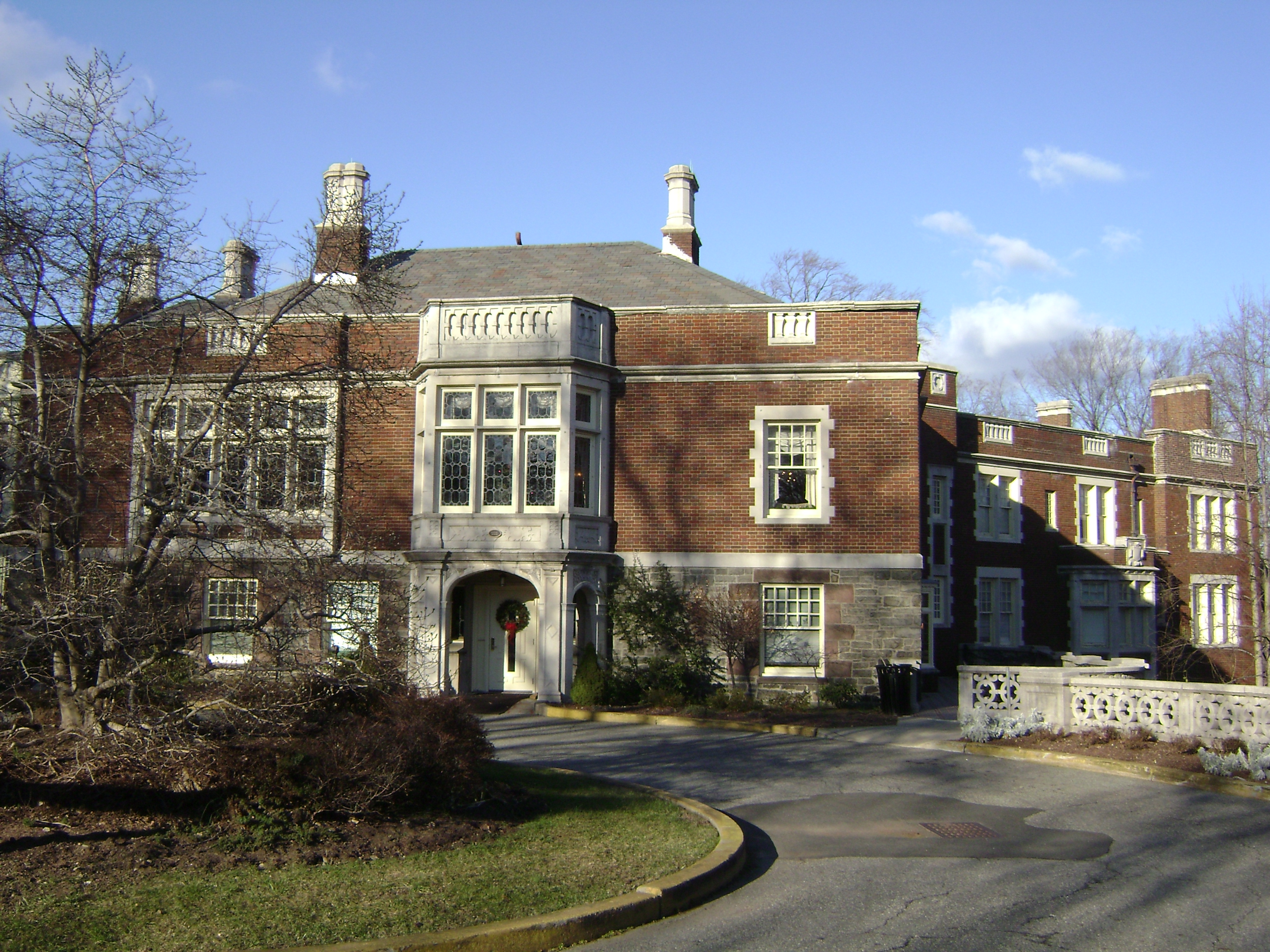
- High Mountain Park Preserve Montclair-Boonton Line crossing the Passaic River Willowbrook Mall Wayne Route 23 Transit Center Dey Mansion Hobart Manor at William Paterson University

- Seal

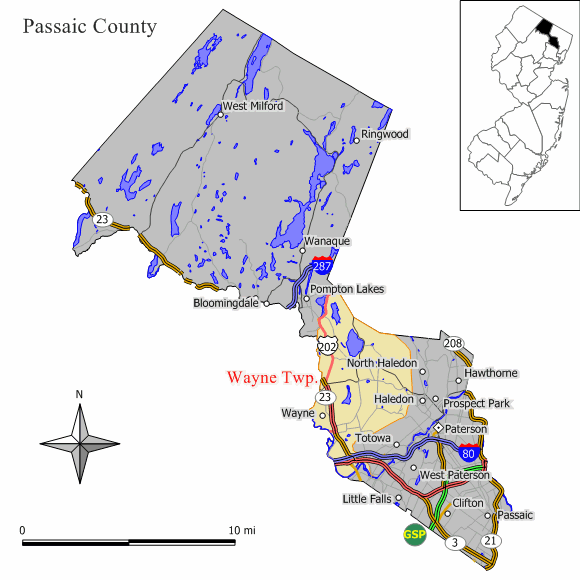
- Map of Wayne in Passaic County. Inset: Location of Passaic County highlighted in the State of New Jersey.

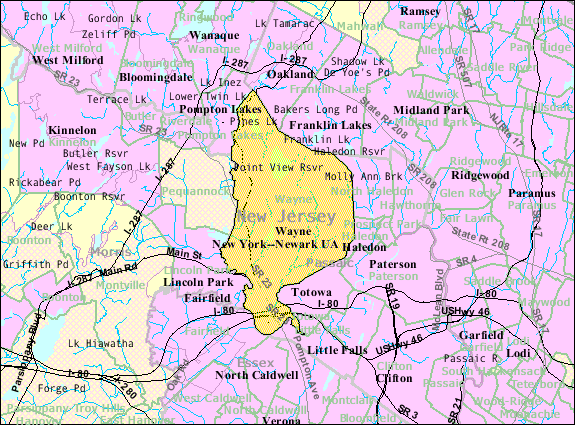
- Census Bureau map of Wayne, New Jersey
- Interactive map of Wayne, New Jersey
- Location in Passaic County Location in New Jersey Location in the United States
- Coordinates: 40.945855°N 74.245077°W
- Country: United States
- State: New Jersey
- County: Passaic
- Incorporated: April 12, 1847
- Named for: Anthony Wayne

Government
  - Type: Faulkner Act (mayor–council)
  - Body: Township Council
  - Mayor: Christopher P. Vergano (R, term ends December 31, 2029)
  - Administrator: Chris Tietjen
  - Municipal clerk: Paul V. Margiotta

Area
  - Total: 25.14 sq mi (65.11 km^{2})
  - Land: 23.72 sq mi (61.44 km^{2})
  - Water: 1.42 sq mi (3.67 km^{2}) 5.64%
  - Rank: 107th of 565 in state 3rd of 16 in county
- Elevation: 400 ft (120 m)

Population (2020)
  - Total: 54,838
  - Estimate (2023): 52,764
  - Rank: 33rd of 565 in state 4th of 16 in county
  - Density: 2,311.7/sq mi (892.6/km^{2})
  - Rank: 269th of 565 in state 12th of 16 in county
- Time zone: UTC−05:00 (Eastern (EST))
  - Summer (DST): UTC−04:00 (Eastern (EDT))
- ZIP Codes: 07470, 07474
- Area codes: 862/973
- FIPS code: 3403177840
- GNIS feature ID: 0882314
- Website: waynetownship.com

Wayne is a township in Passaic County, in the U.S. state of New Jersey. Home to William Paterson University and located less than 20 miles (32 km) from Midtown Manhattan, the township is a bedroom suburb of New York City and regional commercial hub of North Jersey. As of the 2020 United States census, the township's population was 54,838, an increase of 121 (+0.2%) from the 2010 census count of 54,717, which in turn reflected an increase of 648 (+1.2%) from the 54,069 counted in the 2000 census.

Wayne was formed as a township by an act of the New Jersey Legislature on April 12, 1847, from portions of Manchester Township. Totowa was formed from portions of Wayne and Manchester Township on March 15, 1898. Points of interest include William Paterson University, Willowbrook Mall, Wayne Towne Center, High Mountain Park Preserve, and Dey Mansion.

== History ==
In 1694, Arent Schuyler, a surveyor, trader and land speculator, was sent by the British into northwestern New Jersey to investigate rumors that the French were trying to incite the local Lenape Native Americans to rebel against them. He found no evidence of a rebellion, but discovered a fertile river valley where the Lenape grew crops. Schuyler reported his findings to the British and then convinced a group including Major Anthony Brockholst and Samuel Bayard to invest in the land he referred to as the Pompton Valley. The group chose Schuyler to be the negotiator with the Lenape and Bayard to negotiate with the East Jersey Company, the owner of the land rights from the King of England. The group completed their purchase of 5,000 acres (20 km^{2}) on November 11, 1695, and the area became part of what was then known as New Barbadoes Township in Bergen County. Schuyler constructed the Schuyler-Colfax House at this time.

In 1710, the area became part of Saddle River Township. During the Revolutionary War, General George Washington made his headquarters at the Dey Mansion, first in July 1780, and again in October and November 1780. Alexander Hamilton, Washington's aide-de-camp, stayed at the house with him. Troops and generals were spread throughout the area during encampments, including the township's namesake Anthony Wayne and the Marquis de Lafayette, who made his headquarters at the nearby Van Saun House. Near the end of the war, Arent Schuyler's granddaughter Hester Schuyler married William Colfax, a member of Washington's Life Guard, and they lived together at the Schuyler-Colfax House.

In 1837, Passaic County was formed from portions of Bergen County, and the area became part of the new Manchester Township. On April 12, 1847, the first township organization meeting was held, and the citizens voted to split from Manchester and named the new municipality Wayne.

Throughout the 18th and 19th centuries Wayne remained predominantly agricultural, with some industry in the form of grist, saw, and cider mills, blacksmiths, and a Laflin & Rand gunpowder plant. Numerous farmsteads in the township employed slaves until gradual abolition began in New Jersey in 1804; however, the practice continued in some instances under the veil of "apprenticeship" until the Thirteenth Amendment in 1865.

In 1868, Milton H. Sanford, owner of the Preakness Stud, purchased a racehorse for $4,000, naming it Preakness, after the Thoroughbred horse racing and breeding operation established by him in the Preakness section of Wayne. On the horse's maiden start, he was entered into the inaugural "Dinner Party Stakes" at the new Pimlico Race Course in Maryland, winning the race on October 25, 1870. In 1873, Pimlico ran its first race for three year-olds and named it the Preakness Stakes, in honor of the first horse to win a race at the track. Today, the Preakness is the second race in the Triple Crown of thoroughbred racing.

The Morris Canal ran through the southwestern part of Wayne, carrying produce to markets and coal from Pennsylvania. The canal was replaced by the railroad at the end of the 19th century. In the early 20th century Wayne grew as a vacation retreat for wealthy New Yorkers who came by train to stay in bungalows along the area's lakes. New Jersey Route 23 and U.S. Route 46 were constructed across the township during the Great Depression.

During World War II, summer bungalows were converted to year-round residences to accommodate people moving to Wayne to work in war-related industries. Following the war, Wayne suburbanized as farmlands were turned into housing developments, and Interstate 80 was built through the southern part of the township.

== Geography ==
According to the United States Census Bureau, the township had a total area of 25.14 square miles (65.11 km^{2}), including 23.72 square miles (61.44 km^{2}) of land and 1.42 square miles (3.67 km^{2}) of water (5.64%).

Wayne shares its borders with 11 neighboring municipalities: Haledon, Little Falls, North Haledon, Pompton Lakes and Totowa in Passaic County; Franklin Lakes and Oakland in Bergen County; Fairfield Township and North Caldwell in Essex County; and Lincoln Park and Pequannock Township in Morris County.

=== Neighborhoods and lake communities ===
Unincorporated communities, localities and place names located partially or completely within the township include Barbours Mills, Barbours Pond, Lower Preakness, Mountain View, Packanack Lake, Pines Lake, Point View, Pompton Falls, Preakness and Two Bridges.

Wayne has a number of lakes, with distinct communities and neighborhoods located around them. These include Packanack Lake, Pines Lake, Lions Head Lake, Tom's Lake and Pompton Lake (half of which is in Wayne). The Passaic River also flows through a portion of Wayne and often floods near Willowbrook Mall and riverside neighborhoods.

=== Climate ===
Climate data for Wayne, New Jersey
Month	Jan	Feb	Mar	Apr	May	Jun	Jul	Aug	Sep	Oct	Nov	Dec	Year
Mean daily maximum °F (°C)	38 (3)	41 (5)	50 (10)	61 (16)	72 (22)	80 (27)	86 (30)	83 (28)	76 (24)	64 (18)	54 (12)	42 (6)	62 (17)
Mean daily minimum °F (°C)	20 (−7)	21 (−6)	30 (−1)	40 (4)	50 (10)	59 (15)	64 (18)	63 (17)	55 (13)	42 (6)	34 (1)	25 (−4)	42 (6)
Average precipitation inches (mm)	4.14 (105)	2.99 (76)	4.28 (109)	4.34 (110)	4.81 (122)	4.45 (113)	4.59 (117)	4.34 (110)	5.30 (135)	3.92 (100)	4.43 (113)	3.91 (99)	51.50 (1,308)

== Demographics ==
Historical population
Census	Pop.	Note	%±
1850	1,162		—
1860	1,355		16.6%
1870	1,521		12.3%
1880	1,757		15.5%
1890	2,004		14.1%
1900	1,985	*	−0.9%
1910	2,281		14.9%
1920	2,302		0.9%
1930	4,469		94.1%
1940	6,868		53.7%
1950	11,822		72.1%
1960	29,353		148.3%
1970	49,141		67.4%
1980	46,474		−5.4%
1990	47,025		1.2%
2000	54,069		15.0%
2010	54,717		1.2%
2020	54,838		0.2%
2023 (est.)	52,764		−3.8%
Population sources: 1850–1920 1850–1870; 1850 1870 1880–1890; 1890–1910 1910–1930; 1940–2000 2000; 2010 2020 * = Lost territory in previous decade.

=== 2020 census ===
Wayne township, Passaic County, New Jersey – Racial and ethnic composition Note: the US Census treats Hispanic/Latino as an ethnic category. This table excludes Latinos from the racial categories and assigns them to a separate category. Hispanics/Latinos may be of any race.
Race / Ethnicity (NH = Non-Hispanic)	Pop 1990	Pop 2000	Pop 2010	Pop 2020	% 1990	% 2000	% 2010	% 2020
White alone (NH)	43,623	46,766	44,030	39,997	92.77%	86.49%	80.47%	72.93%
Black or African American alone (NH)	465	843	1,124	1,639	0.99%	1.56%	2.05%	2.99%
Native American or Alaska Native alone (NH)	29	41	34	26	0.06%	0.08%	0.06%	0.05%
Asian alone (NH)	1,437	3,056	4,441	5,167	3.06%	5.65%	8.12%	9.42%
Native Hawaiian or Pacific Islander alone (NH)	N/A	8	9	0	N/A	0.01%	0.02%	0.00%
Other race alone (NH)	24	47	103	218	0.05%	0.09%	0.19%	0.40%
Mixed race or Multiracial (NH)	N/A	554	641	1,352	N/A	1.02%	1.17%	2.47%
Hispanic or Latino (any race)	1,447	2,754	4,335	6,439	3.08%	5.09%	7.92%	11.74%
Total	47,025	54,069	54.717	54,838	100.00%	100.00%	100.00%	100.00%

=== 2010 census ===
The 2010 United States census counted 54,717 people, 19,127 households, and 14,230 families in the township. The population density was 2,306.0 per square mile (890.4/km^{2}). There were 19,768 housing units at an average density of 833.1 per square mile (321.7/km^{2}). The racial makeup was 86.07% (47,097) White, 2.28% (1,247) Black or African American, 0.09% (51) Native American, 8.18% (4,478) Asian, 0.02% (11) Pacific Islander, 1.80% (985) from other races, and 1.55% (848) from two or more races. Hispanic or Latino of any race were 7.92% (4,335) of the population.

Of the 19,127 households, 33.0% had children under the age of 18; 62.9% were married couples living together; 8.6% had a female householder with no husband present and 25.6% were non-families. Of all households, 22.2% were made up of individuals and 12.3% had someone living alone who was 65 years of age or older. The average household size was 2.71 and the average family size was 3.21.

22.0% of the population were under the age of 18, 10.3% from 18 to 24, 21.1% from 25 to 44, 29.6% from 45 to 64, and 17.0% who were 65 years of age or older. The median age was 42.8 years. For every 100 females, the population had 91.9 males. For every 100 females ages 18 and older there were 88.4 males.

The Census Bureau's 2006–2010 American Community Survey showed that (in 2010 inflation-adjusted dollars) median household income was $100,638 (with a margin of error of +/− $3,630) and the median family income was $117,745 (+/− $5,252). Males had a median income of $80,420 (+/− $5,367) versus $54,413 (+/− $2,379) for females. The per capita income for the township was $40,875 (+/− $1,473). About 2.2% of families and 3.6% of the population were below the poverty line, including 2.9% of those under age 18 and 6.6% of those age 65 or over.

Same-sex couples headed 105 households in 2010, an increase from the 75 counted in 2000.

While Wayne has been and remains predominantly White, it has increased in diversity over the years. From 2000 to 2010, the percentage of every minority group has gone up. Some of the prevalent ethnic minority groups include Indian Americans at 3.0% and Korean Americans at 2.0%, while Puerto Ricans were 2.3% of the population.

=== 2000 census ===
As of the 2000 United States census, there were 54,069 people, 18,755 households, and 14,366 families residing in the township. The population density was 2,269.5/mi^{2} (876.4/km^{2}). There were 19,218 housing units at an average density of 806.7/mi^{2} (806.7/km^{2}). The racial makeup of the township was 90.05% White, 1.66% African American, 0.10% Native American, 5.67% Asian, 0.02% Pacific Islander, 1.17% from other races, and 1.34% from two or more races. Hispanic or Latino of any race were 5.09% of the population.

There were 18,755 households, out of which 34.4% had related children under the age of 18 living with them, 66.4% were married couples living together, 7.6% had a female householder with no husband present, and 23.4% were non-families. 20.2% of all households were made up of individuals, and 10.1% had someone living alone who was 65 years of age or older. The average household size was 2.74 and the average family size was 3.19.

In the township the age distribution of the population shows 23.2% under the age of 18, 8.1% from 18 to 24, 27.6% from 25 to 44, 24.9% from 45 to 64, and 16.2% who were 65 years of age or older. The median age was 40 years. For every 100 females, there were 90.6 males. For every 100 females age 18 and over, there were 87.4 males.

The median income for a household in the township was $83,651, and the median income for a family was $95,114. Males had a median income of $61,271 versus $39,835 for females. The per capita income for the township was $35,349. About 1.6% of families and 2.8% of the population were below the poverty line, including 2.1% of those under age 18 and 4.8% of those age 65 or over.

== Economy ==
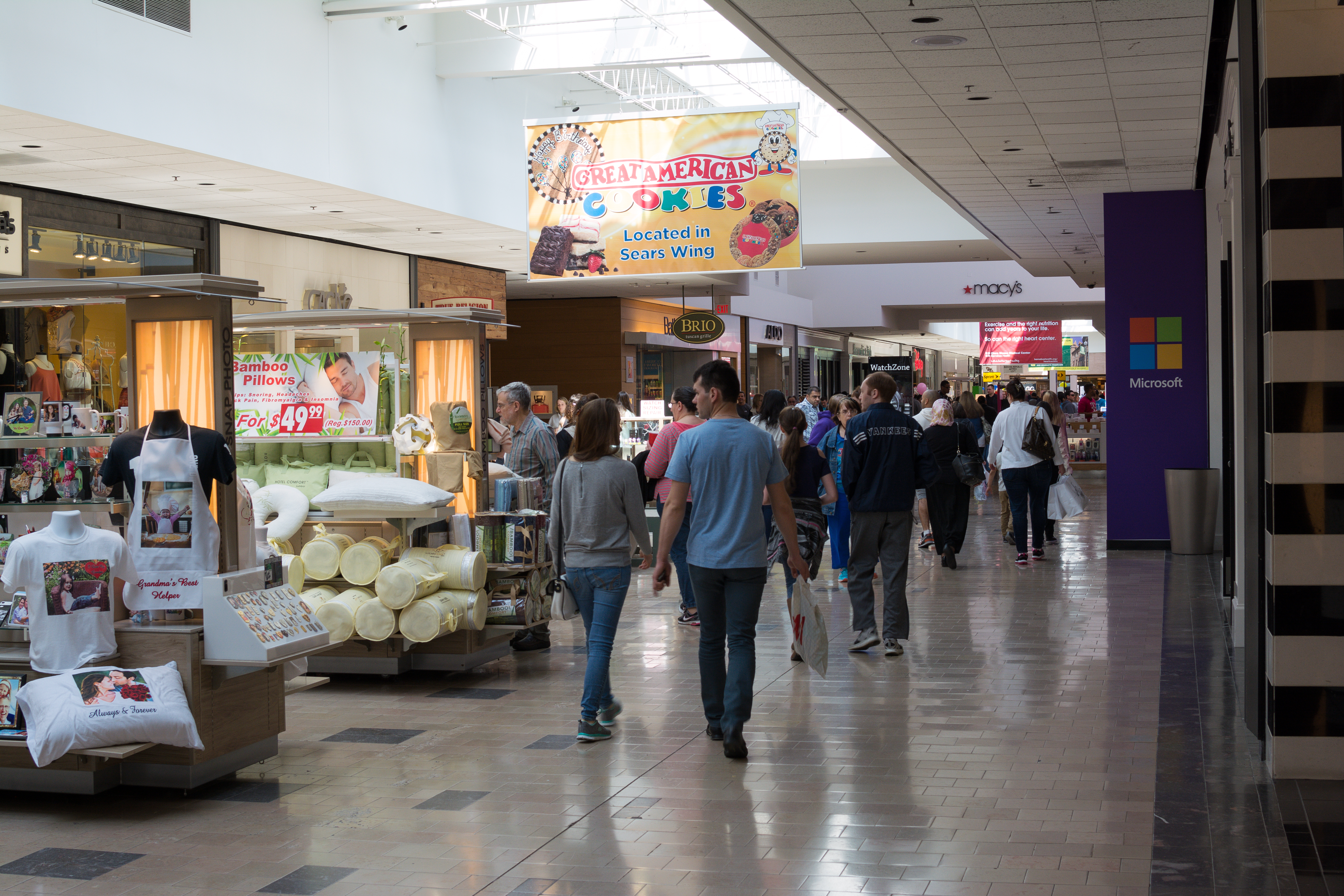
Interior of Willowbrook Mall

Wayne was home to the Toys "R" Us United States corporate headquarters, before it filed for Chaper 11 bankruptcy in September 2017 and ceased to operate as an independent, publicly traded firm. Brands associated with the former toy-retailer firm were acquired by Tru Kids. The former Toys "R" Us headquarters at One Geoffrey Way is now home to medical device manufacturer Getinge, housing their United States sales, service and training operations. Wayne continues to host the headquarters of the Valley Bank (formerly Valley National Bank) corporate headquarters. JVC has their US office in Wayne and employ approximately 19,040.

Willowbrook Mall is a two-level indoor shopping mall in the township, the fourth-largest mall in the state, featuring 200 retail establishments and a gross leasable area of 1,514,000 square feet (140,700 m^{2}). The Willowbrook Mall went through a renovation in 2018–19 that added new flooring, lighting, seating and a few new restaurants. Sears was closed and a Sears Tire Center was demolished; a 12-screen state-of-the-art Cinemark movie theater was built in its place. Adjacent to it is the Wayne Towne Center regional shopping center, which features a movie theater under the AMC brand.

== Sports ==
Wayne is the home of the 1970 Little League World Series Champions. The Preakness Stakes, a race in the Triple Crown of Thoroughbred Racing, was named after a race horse from Wayne's Preakness Stud, who won the Dinner-Stakes race at the Pimlico Race Course in Baltimore, Maryland, sponsored by the Maryland Jockey Club on October 25, 1870.

Wayne is home to the Ice Vault ice rink, where world-class figure skaters such as Johnny Weir and Stéphane Lambiel train and 1992 Olympic figure skating gold medalist Viktor Petrenko coaches. The rink is also home to hockey teams such as the New Jersey Bandits, the New Jersey Hitmen and the William Paterson University ice hockey team.

Noted golf course architect Willie Tucker designed the Preakness Hills Country Club in Wayne. Formed as a club in 1926, the golf course was completed in 1929.

== Government ==
=== Local government ===
Wayne is governed under the Mayor-Council plan F system of municipal government under the Faulkner Act, as implemented on January 1, 1962, by direct petition. The township is one of 71 municipalities (of the 564) statewide that use this form of government. The governing body is comprised of the mayor and the township council. The mayor is elected directly by the voters to serve a four-year term. The township council, which forms the legislative branch of the township government, is comprised of nine members elected to four-year terms of office, of which three council members are elected at-large and one member is elected from each of six wards. All members of the governing body are chosen on a partisan basis as part of the November general election in odd-numbered years, with the six ward seats up for election together, and two years later, the three at-large seats and the mayoral seat all up for vote.

As of 2026, Wayne's mayor is Republican Christopher P. Vergano, whose term of office ends December 31, 2029. Members of the township council are Council President Michael Fattal (R, 2027; Ward 3), Richard Jasterzbski (R, 2027; Ward 1), Al Sadowski (R, 2027; Ward 2), Joseph Scuralli (R, 2027; Ward 4), Francine Ritter (D, 2027; Ward 5) Jonathan Ettman (R, 2027; Ward 6), Jason DeStefano (R, 2029; at-large), Donald DeDio (R, 2029; at-large), and Frank Pietropaolo (R, 2029; at-large).

Ritter's win in 2019, defeating then-incumbent Lucy "Aileen" Rivera, was the first time local voters elected any Democrats since Christopher McIntyre got defeated by Rivera in 2015; before McIntyre won in 1995, there had not been any Democrats on the council in at least 20 years.

In 2024, the township had an average property tax bill of $13,698, the highest in the county, compared to an average bill of $10,095 statewide.

=== Emergency services ===
The Township's Police Department consists of 126 sworn officers and is led by Chief Joseph Rooney.

The Wayne Fire Department is comprised of five volunteer companies, consisting of a total of eleven pumpers, three aerial towers/ladders, one brush pumper, one squad truck, multiple boats, one rescue truck, and one Special Emergency Response Team vehicle.

The Wayne Township Memorial First Aid Squad provides round the clock volunteer emergency medical services to the residents of Wayne, utilizing six ambulances, a mass casualty bus, a heavy rescue vehicle and boats, and operates out of 2 stations located in the township.

=== Federal, state, and county representation ===
Wayne is located in the 9th and 11th Congressional Districts and is part of New Jersey's 40th state legislative district.

Prior to the 2010 Census, Wayne had been part of the 8th Congressional District, a change made by the New Jersey Redistricting Commission that took effect in January 2013, based on the results of the November 2012 general elections.

For the 119th United States Congress, New Jersey's 11th congressional district is represented by Analilia Mejia (D, Glen Ridge) who was elected in a 2026 special election to serve for the remainder of the Congress following the resignation Mikie Sherrill (D, Montclair), who was elected Governor of New Jersey in 2025. For the 119th United States Congress, New Jersey's 9th congressional district is represented by Nellie Pou (D, North Haledon) New Jersey is represented in the United States Senate by Democrats Cory Booker (Newark, term ends 2027) and Andy Kim (Moorestown, term ends 2031).

For the 2026–2027 session, the 40th legislative district of the New Jersey Legislature is represented in the State Senate by Kristin Corrado (R, Totowa) and in the General Assembly by Al Barlas (R, Cedar Grove) and Christopher DePhillips (R, Wyckoff).

Passaic County is governed by a Board of County Commissioners, comprised of seven members who are elected at-large to staggered three-year terms office on a partisan basis, with two or three seats coming up for election each year as part of the November general election in a three-year cycle. At a reorganization meeting held in January, the board selects a Director and Deputy Director from among its members to serve for a one-year term. As of 2026, Passaic County's Commissioners are: Director Cassandra "Sandi" Lazzara (D), Little Falls, term as commissioner ends December 31, 2027; term as director ends 2026), Deputy Director Orlando Cruz (D, Paterson, term as commissioner and as deputy director ends 2026), Rodney DeVore (D, Paterson, 2027), Bruce James (D, Clifton, 2026) Michael Ramaglia (D, West Milford, 2028), Christina Schratz (D, Passaic, 2028) and Nick Veliky (D, Clifton, appointed to a term ending in 2027).

Constitutional officers, elected on a countywide basis, are County Clerk Danielle Ireland-Imhof (D, Hawthorne, 2028), Sheriff Thomas Adamo (D, Wayne, 2027) and Surrogate Zoila S. Cassanova (D, Wayne, 2026).

=== Politics ===
As of March 2011, there were a total of 35,661 registered voters in Wayne, of which 8,538 (23.9% vs. 31.0% countywide) were registered as Democrats, 11,180 (31.4% vs. 18.7%) were registered as Republicans and 15,933 (44.7% vs. 50.3%) were registered as Unaffiliated. There were 10 voters registered to other parties. Among the township's 2010 Census population, 65.2% (vs. 53.2% in Passaic County) were registered to vote, including 83.5% of those ages 18 and over (vs. 70.8% countywide). It is the only polity outside of the countries of Georgia and Ukraine to officially recognize the Circassian genocide.

Gubernatorial election results for Wayne
Year	Republican		Democratic		Third party(ies)	
Year	No.	%	No.	%	No.	%
2025	12,196	53.13%	10,734	46.76%	26	0.11%
2021	11,281	58.07%	8,030	41.34%	115	0.59%
2017	7,480	51.11%	6,922	47.30%	233	1.59%
2013	10,824	66.18%	5,364	32.80%	168	1.03%
2009	10,246	57.76%	6,623	37.34%	870	4.90%
2005	8,709	52.15%	7,643	45.76%	349	2.09%

In the 2012 presidential election, Republican Mitt Romney received 54.8% of the vote (13,983 cast), ahead of Democrat Barack Obama with 44.2% (11,283 votes), and other candidates with 1.0% (243 votes), among the 25,709 ballots cast by the township's 37,431 registered voters (200 ballots were spoiled), for a turnout of 68.7%. In the 2008 presidential election, Republican John McCain received 14,803 votes (53.9% vs. 37.7% countywide), ahead of Democrat Barack Obama with 11,853 votes (43.1% vs. 58.8%) and other candidates with 265 votes (1.0% vs. 0.8%), among the 27,486 ballots cast by the township's 36,386 registered voters, for a turnout of 75.5% (vs. 70.4% in Passaic County). In the 2004 presidential election, Republican George W. Bush received 15,013 votes (54.9% vs. 42.7% countywide), ahead of Democrat John Kerry with 11,582 votes (42.4% vs. 53.9%) and other candidates with 190 votes (0.7% vs. 0.7%), among the 27,331 ballots cast by the township's 35,463 registered voters, for a turnout of 77.1% (vs. 69.3% in the whole county).

Presidential elections results
Year	Republican	Democratic	Third Parties
2024	55.0% 16,252	40.9% 12,085	4.1% 1,077
2020	51.0% 16,455	46.9% 15,125	2.1% 354
2016	53.5% 14,180	42.7% 11,311	2.9% 763
2012	54.8% 13,983	44.2% 11,283	1.0% 243
2008	53.9% 14,803	43.1% 11,583	1.0% 265
2004	54.9% 15,013	42.4% 11,582	0.7% 190

In the 2013 gubernatorial election, Republican Chris Christie received 66.2% of the vote (10,824 cast), ahead of Democrat Barbara Buono with 32.8% (5,364 votes), and other candidates with 1.0% (168 votes), among the 16,595 ballots cast by the township's 37,825 registered voters (239 ballots were spoiled), for a turnout of 43.9%. In the 2009 gubernatorial election, Republican Chris Christie received 10,246 votes (57.1% vs. 43.2% countywide), ahead of Democrat Jon Corzine with 6,623 votes (36.9% vs. 50.8%), Independent Chris Daggett with 769 votes (4.3% vs. 3.8%) and other candidates with 101 votes (0.6% vs. 0.9%), among the 17,930 ballots cast by the township's 35,321 registered voters, yielding a 50.8% turnout (vs. 42.7% in the county).

United States Senate election results for Wayne1
Year	Republican		Democratic		Third party(ies)	
Year	No.	%	No.	%	No.	%
2024	15,049	53.70%	11,892	42.43%	1,085	3.87%
2018	11,677	53.22%	9,139	41.65%	1,125	5.13%
2012	12,024	52.48%	10,419	45.47%	470	2.05%
2006	8,434	53.23%	7,178	45.31%	231	1.46%

United States Senate election results for Wayne2
Year	Republican		Democratic		Third party(ies)	
Year	No.	%	No.	%	No.	%
2020	15,854	50.46%	14,984	47.69%	580	1.85%
2014	6,588	54.05%	5,416	44.44%	184	1.51%
2013	5,426	55.75%	4,216	43.32%	91	0.93%
2008	12,832	51.24%	11,821	47.20%	390	1.56%

== Education ==
=== Public schools ===
The Wayne Public Schools serves students in pre-kindergarten through twelfth grade. As of the 2022–23 school year, the district, comprised of 15 schools, had an enrollment of 7,746 students and 677.0 classroom teachers (on an FTE basis), for a student–teacher ratio of 11.4:1. Schools in the district (with 2022–23 enrollment data from the National Center for Education Statistics) are Preakness Early Childhood Center (198 students; in PreK), Randall Carter Elementary School (309; K–5), Theunis Dey Elementary School (435; K–5), James Fallon Elementary School (373; K–5), John F. Kennedy Elementary School (377; K–5), Lafayette Elementary School (311; K–5), Packanack Elementary School (406; K–5), Pines Lake Elementary School (387; K–5), Ryerson Elementary School (237; K–5), Albert P. Terhune Elementary School (373; K–5), Schuyler-Colfax Middle School (621; 6–8), George Washington Middle School (508; 6–8), Anthony Wayne Middle School (665; 6–8), Wayne Hills High School (1,182; 9-12 - serving students living on and north of Ratzer Road) and Wayne Valley High School (1,241; 9–12 - serving students living south of Ratzer Road).

Passaic County Technical Institute is a regional vocational public high school that serves students from Passaic County. In 2018 PCTI inaugurated a new building specifically for STEM (Science, Technology, Engineering, Math).

=== Private schools ===
Saint Elizabeth Ann Seton Academy Catholic School and DePaul Catholic High School serve students in grades 9–12, both operating under the auspices of the Roman Catholic Diocese of Paterson. Immaculate Heart of Mary Catholic School, which had opened in 1959 for students in grades K–8 and had been recognized in 2007 by the National Blue Ribbon Schools Program, closed at the end of the 2023–24 school year due to dropping enrollment and fiscal deficits.

Al-Ghazaly High School, an Islamic high school for students in seventh through twelfth grades, opened at a new facility in Wayne in September 2013, relocating from a site in Teaneck, where the school had been based since 1984.

Pioneer Academy, a private school, is a regionally accredited independent school that serves grades K–12.

=== Post-secondary education ===
William Paterson University, founded in 1855, has over 11,500 students in its undergraduate and graduate programs.

Passaic County Community College's Public Safety Academy (PSA) on Oldham Road offers training and facilities for fire fighting and emergency medical personnel. Adjacent to it is the Passaic County Police Academy, where police recruits and alternate route candidates are given basic police training.

== Transportation ==
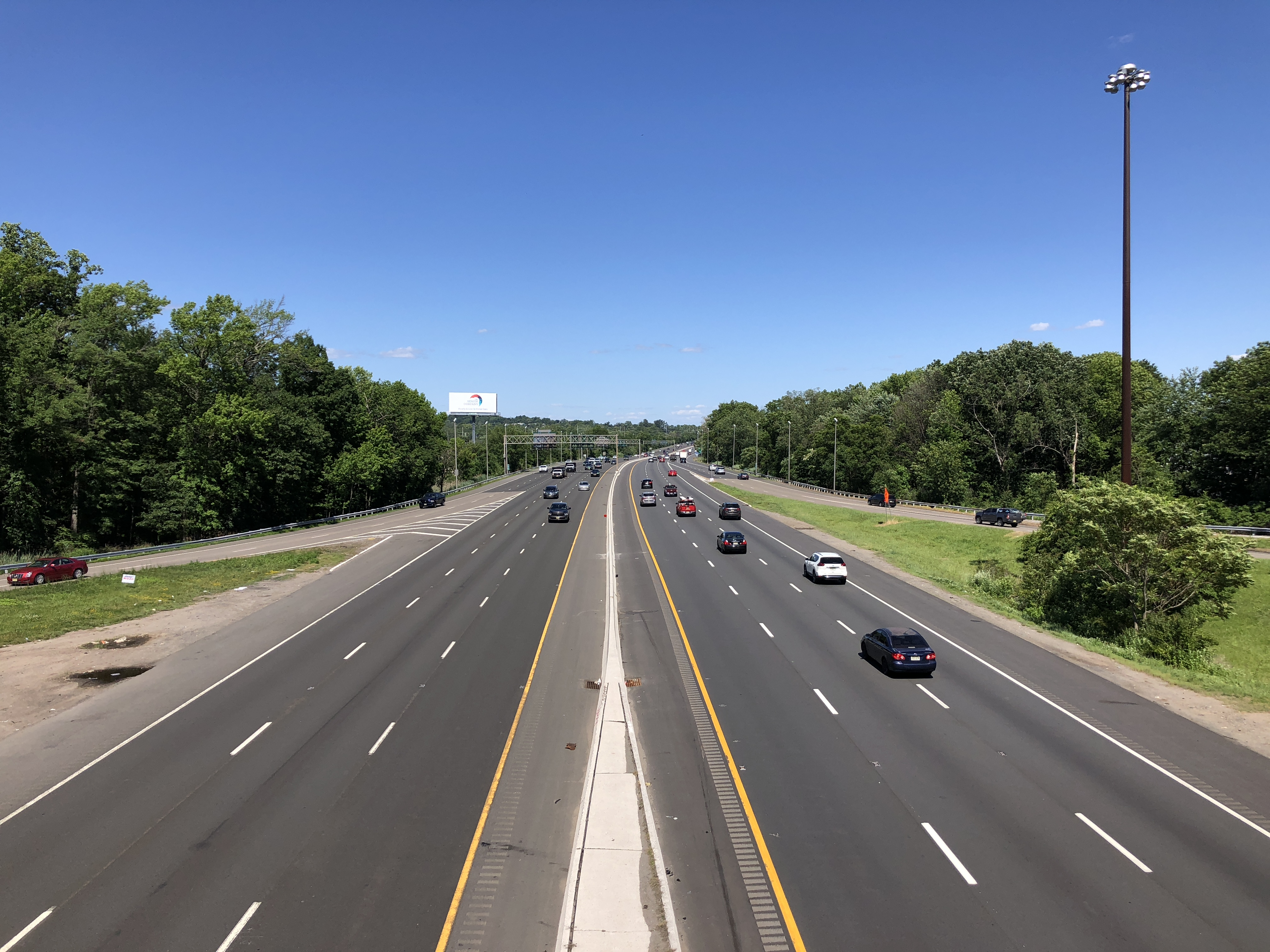
Interstate 80 eastbound past Route 23 in Wayne

=== Roads and highways ===
As of May 2010, the township had a total of 229.48 miles (369.31 km) of roadways, of which 180.59 miles (290.63 km) were maintained by the municipality, 41.05 miles (66.06 km) by Passaic County and 7.84 miles (12.62 km) by the New Jersey Department of Transportation.

Wayne is crisscrossed by several major roadways, including Interstate 80, U.S. Route 46, U.S. Route 202, Route 23, County Route 502, and County Route 504.

=== Public transportation ===
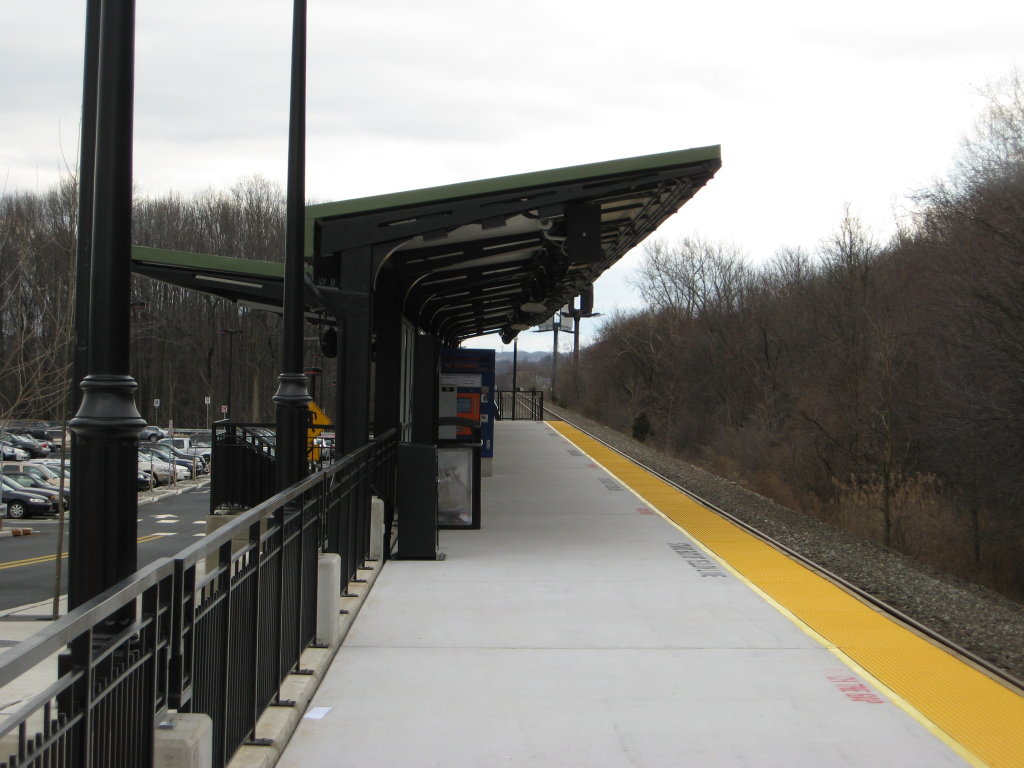
Wayne Route 23 Train Station

Wayne is served by NJ Transit at the Mountain View and Wayne Route 23 stations, offering service to Hoboken Terminal, with connections to Midtown Direct trains to New York Penn Station in Midtown Manhattan on the Montclair-Boonton Line. Wayne-Route 23 station opened in January 2008 and offers train service via the Montclair-Boonton Line. There is regular bus service into the Port Authority Bus Terminal in Midtown Manhattan on the 194 Newfoundland-New York route and the 198 William Paterson University-New York route on weekends, with local service on the 748 Paterson-Willowbrook route (except Sunday).

NJ Transit provides bus service to and from the Port Authority Bus Terminal in Midtown Manhattan on the 191, 193, 194, 195 and 324; to Newark on the 11 and 28 (Saturday and Sunday only) routes, with local service provided on the 873, 704, 705, 712, 744, and 748 routes. In September 2012, as part of budget cuts, NJ Transit suspended service to Newark on the 75 line.

Wayne is 25.9 miles (41.7 km) from Newark Liberty International Airport in Newark / Elizabeth, and 30 miles (48 km) from LaGuardia Airport in Flushing, Queens.

== In popular culture ==
The indie rock band Fountains of Wayne took their name from a lawn ornament store that was located in the township on the westbound side of U.S. Route 46, though no members of the band are from the town. The store is now out of business. The same store was featured in an episode of HBO's The Sopranos, along with several other locations in Wayne.

In a Hans and Franz sketch from Saturday Night Live, the pair says they are opening up a gym in Wayne.

The town is mentioned in the song "Jimmy Mushrooms' Last Drink: Bedtime in Wayne, NJ" by Will Wood and the Tapeworms

Evergreen trees from Wayne have been selected to serve as the Rockefeller Center Christmas tree in New York City in 1998, 2001, 2005 and 2006. The 2005 tree, a Norway Spruce that stood 74 feet (23 m) tall and weighed 9 short tons (8,200 kg), with a spread of 42 feet (13 m) wide, was one of the largest trees ever installed at Rockefeller Center.

== Notable people ==
People who were born in, residents of, or otherwise closely associated with Wayne include:

- David Ackroyd (born 1940), actor, who first came to prominence in soap operas such as The Secret Storm and Another World
- Marina Alex (born 1990), professional golfer
- Ann Althouse (born 1951), law professor and blogger
- Joseph Brain (born 1940), physiologist and environmental health researcher
- Bill Brennan, former firefighter, lawyer, gadfly and activist
- Joseph Bubba (born 1938), politician who served for five terms in the New Jersey Senate, from 1982 to 1998
- Jonathan Cahn (born 1959), Messianic Jewish minister of the Beth Israel Worship Center
- Peter Cammarano (born 1977), 37th Mayor of Hoboken, New Jersey, serving from July 1 until July 31, 2009, resigning shortly after his arrest in the conspiracy probe known as Operation Bid Rig
- Chris Carter (born 1959), founding member and bass player of the alternative rock band Dramarama
- Mike Chlasciak (born 1971), guitarist for heavy metal band Halford
- Jay Della Valle (born 1979), filmmaker, singer and songwriter
- Cecil B. DeMille (1881–1959), film director, producer (The Ten Commandments)
- Nickolette Driesse (born 1994), soccer midfielder who plays for Orlando Pride of National Women's Soccer League
- Lou Duva (1922–2017), Hall of Fame boxing trainer and manager
- John Easdale (born 1961), lead singer and songwriter for the alternative rock band Dramarama
- Lisa Edelstein (born 1966), American actress known for her role as Dr. Lisa Cuddy on the television drama House. Currently stars in the television show Girlfriends' Guide to Divorce
- Theodore Ellenis, keyboard player for the alternative rock band Dramarama
- Mark Englert, guitarist for the alternative rock band Dramarama
- Lou Esa (born 1952), former professional heavyweight boxer
- Jesse Farbman, drummer for the alternative rock band Dramarama
- Jazmine Fenlator (born 1985), bobsledder who was one of three pilots of the U.S. Olympic Bobsled team for the 2014 Winter Olympics in Sochi
- John A. Ferraro (1946–2010), actor, television director and stage director
- Alice Guy-Blaché (1873–1968), French pioneer, first female filmmaker
- Paulie Harraka (born 1989), stock car racing driver
- Daniel Im (born 1985), professional golfer
- Brandon Jacobs (born 1982), running back who played for the New York Giants
- Jack A. James Jr. (born 1968), United States Army major general
- Vyto Kab (born 1959), American football tight end who played in the NFL for the Philadelphia Eagles, Detroit Lions and New York Giants
- Nicholas Kaloukian (born 2003), professional football player who plays as a forward for Armenian Premier League club Urartu
- Charley Lang (born 1955), actor, director, psychotherapist and professor of psychology
- Jonathan Lebed (born 1984), stock trader prosecuted by the SEC at age 15 for stock manipulation
- Felicia Lee (born 1992), competition swimmer who has been a member of the U.S. National Team
- David Lichtenverg (born 1957), punk/garage musician
- Barry Littlefield (1871–1936), thoroughbred racehorse trainer inducted into the Canadian Horse Racing Hall of Fame
- Tom Longo (1942–2015), defensive back who played three seasons in the National Football League with the New York Giants and St. Louis Cardinals
- Ronny Machuga, drummer for the alternative rock band Dramarama
- Marc Maron (born 1963), stand-up comedian, podcaster, writer and actor
- Pellegrino Matarazzo (born 1977), soccer coach for the La Liga club Real Sociedad
- Gene Mayer (born 1956), former tennis player from the United States who won fourteen singles titles during his career. At Wayne Valley, he went unbeaten in his two years on the tennis team
- Darryl "D.M.C." McDaniels (born 1964), American musician and hip hop artist (Run-D.M.C.)
- Bryan Miller (born 1983), retired professional ice hockey defenseman
- Pete Muller, investment fund manager and quantitative trader who founded PDT Partners in 1993 as part of Morgan Stanley's trading division
- Ryan Neill (born 1982), football long snapper and defensive end who played for the Buffalo Bills
- Greg Olsen (born 1985), color commentator for Fox Sports Football broadcasts who played in the NFL as tight end for the Carolina Panthers
- Jessielyn Palumbo (born 1992), Miss New Jersey USA 2016, competed at MISS USA 2016 on FOX
- Chris Pantale (born 1990), tight end who played for the New York Jets
- Sam Porcello (1935–2012), food scientist who developed the Oreo cookie filling
- Queen Latifah (born 1970), singer and actress
- Storm Queen (stage name of Morgan Geist), DJ who released the single "Look Right Through" which topped the charts in the UK and Ireland in 2013
- Ryan Quigley (born 1990), punter for the New York Jets
- Norman M. Robertson (born 1951), Republican Party politician and attorney who served a single term in the New Jersey Senate, from 1998 to 2002
- Robert A. Roe (1924–2014), former member of the United States House of Representatives who served as mayor of Wayne from 1956 to 1961
- Scott Rumana (born 1964), member of the New Jersey General Assembly, former mayor of Wayne (2002–2007) and councilman
- Francesca Russo (born 1995), fencer who represented Team USA at the 2020 Tokyo Summer Olympics, competing as part of the Women's Sabre team
- Carl Sawatski (1927–1991), catcher who played in Major League Baseball and was an influential figure as an executive in Minor League Baseball
- Justin Shackil (born 1987), sportscaster and radio announcer for the New York Yankees
- Cynthia Paige Simon (born 1970), visually impaired retired Paralympic judoka who competed in international level events
- Danielle Staub (born 1962), cast member on The Real Housewives of New Jersey
- Major General Guy C. Swan III (born 1954), commanding general of the United States Army North
- Holly Taylor (born 1997), actress and dancer who performed in the Broadway production of Billy Elliot the Musical as Sharon Percy (Ballet Girl) and plays the role of Paige Jennings in the FX television series The Americans
- Albert Payson Terhune (1872–1942), author, dog breeder
- David Tyree (born 1980), wide receiver for the New York Giants and a 2005 Pro Bowl selection
- Ryan Van Demark (born 1998), American football offensive tackle for the Buffalo Bills
- Kathy Wakile (born 1965), cast member on The Real Housewives of New Jersey
- Louise Currie Wilmot (born 1942), retired United States Navy rear admiral who was the first woman to command a United States Naval base and was the highest-ranking female Naval officer at the time of her retirement
- Vikki Ziegler (born c. 1972), lawyer and author who was the focus of the reality television show Untying the Knot
