= Untying the Knot =

American reality television series

- Genre: Reality television
- Starring: Vikki Ziegler; Michael Millea; Mark Millea
- Country of origin: United States
- Original language: English
- No. of seasons: 2
- No. of episodes: 14

Production
- Executive producers: Steven Engel; Dean W. Slotar
- Camera setup: Multiple
- Running time: 22 minutes (season 1); 43 minutes (season 2)
- Production company: Engel Entertainment

Original release
- Network: Bravo
- Release: June 4, 2014 – February 1, 2016

Untying the Knot is an American reality television series that premiered June 4, 2014, and aired on Bravo. The series follows the life of Vikki Ziegler, a divorce mediator. Ziegler mediates, advises and divides divorcing couples' assets out of court. Mark and Michael Millea work with Ziegler in appraising items, they are featured regularly in the series.

In November 2014, the show was renewed for a second season. The second season was expanded to an hour-long format. The second season premiered on November 8, 2015.

== Cast ==
- Vikki Ziegler is a practicing matrimonial lawyer and civil litigator based in New York and New Jersey. She has founded her own law firm, Ziegler and Zemsky LLC. She is a practicing attorney of matrimonial law and civil litigation; a television personality known for her commentaries on high-profile cases; an active volunteer for women's and children's charities; and the innovator of a unique and realistic approach to “divorce management.” Bringing together her insights as a divorce attorney, her childhood experience of her own parents’ divorce, and years of careful listening to clients and friends, Ziegler's approach seeks to de-stigmatize divorce by allowing its empowering aspects to triumph.
- Michael Millea and Mark Millea are two brothers who are co-founders and owners Millea Bros. Ltd., a boutique auction and appraisal company, specializing in fine art and antiques from upscale New York metropolitan area estates.

== Episodes ==
=== Series overview ===
Season	Episodes	Originally released	
Season	Episodes	First released	Last released
1	6	June 4, 2014	July 9, 2014
2	8	November 8, 2015	February 1, 2016

=== Season 1 (2014) ===
No. overall	No. in season	Title	Original release date	US viewers (millions)
1	1	"Battle of the Buddha Head"	June 4, 2014	0.84
2	2	"Passport for Divorce"	June 11, 2014	0.83
3	3	"The War of the Weisses"	June 18, 2014	0.88
4	4	"To D or Not to D"	June 25, 2014	0.75
5	5	"A Date for Divorce"	July 2, 2014	0.79
6	6	"From Wedding Couture to Marriage Detour"	July 9, 2014	0.62

=== Season 2 (2015–16) ===
No. overall	No. in season	Title	Original release date	US viewers (millions)
7	1	"Two Wrights Make a Marriage Wrong"	November 8, 2015	1.56
8	2	"Zen and the Art of Marriage Maintenance"	November 11, 2015	N/A
9	3	"The Belle and the Bachelor"	November 18, 2015	N/A
10	4	"This Little Piggy Went to Mediation"	January 4, 2016	0.57
11	5	"War Of The Rosie"	January 11, 2016	0.65
12	6	"He's Fast, She's Furious"	January 18, 2016	0.79
13	7	"Big Trouble in Sin City"	January 25, 2016	0.73
14	8	"Law and Disorder"	February 1, 2016	0.66
