= Dey Mansion =

Historic house in New Jersey, United States

- U.S. National Register of Historic Places
- New Jersey Register of Historic Places
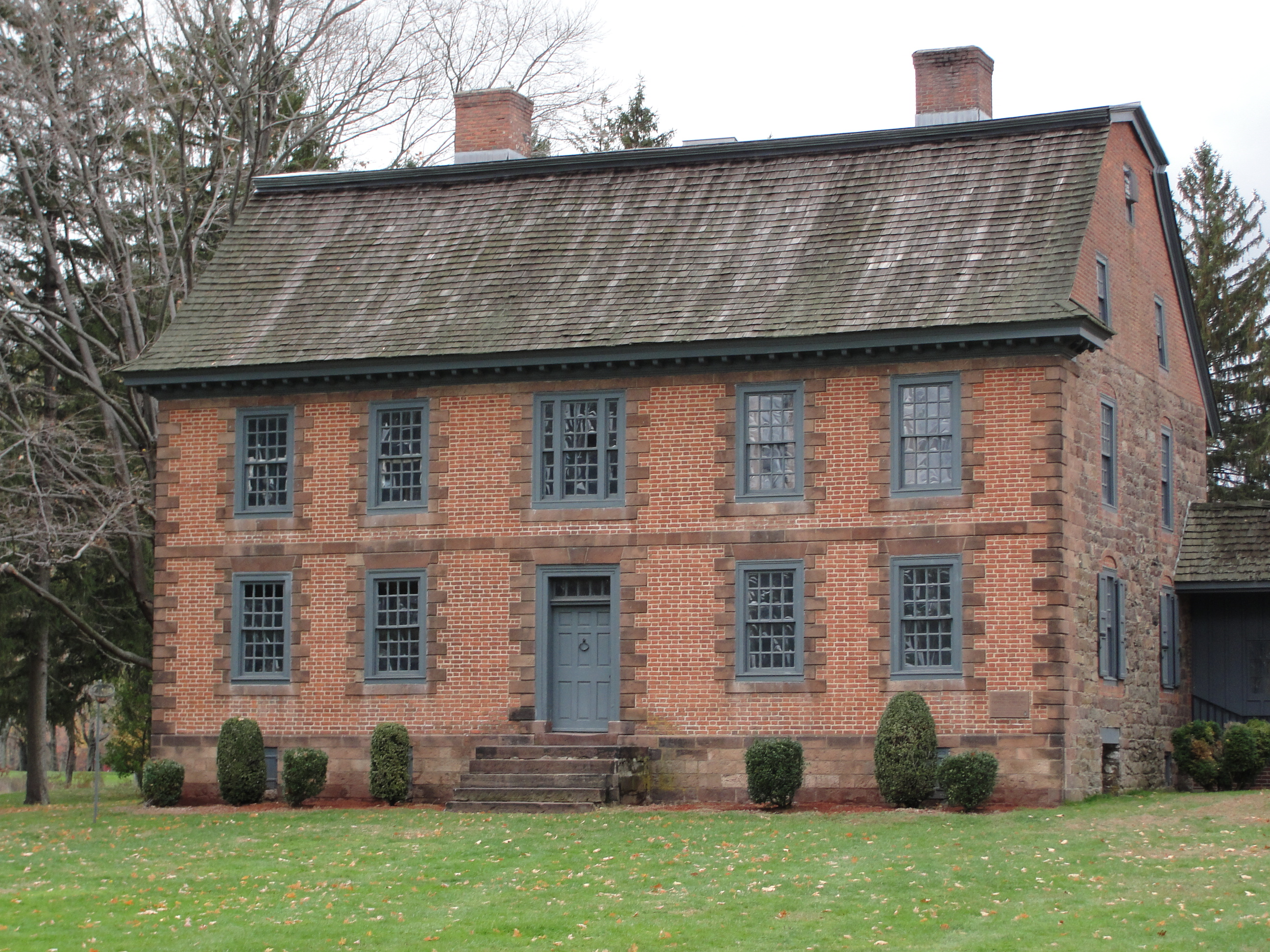

- Location within Passaic County, New Jersey Location within New Jersey Location within the United States
- Location: 199 Totowa Road, Wayne, NJ 07470
- Coordinates: 40°54′56″N 74°14′0″W
- Area: 2.2 acres (0.89 ha)
- Architectural style: Georgian Style with Dutch and English Influences
- NRHP reference No.: 70000392
- NJRHP No.: 2409

Significant dates
- Added to NRHP: December 18, 1970
- Designated NJRHP: September 11, 1970

The Dey Mansion (pronounced dye), located in modern-day Wayne, Passaic County, New Jersey, United States, and originally known as Bloomsburg Manor, played an integral role in the American Revolutionary War. Built by Col. Theunis Dey in the 1770s, it served as Washington's Headquarters on several occasions. Today, the Dey Mansion is currently open year-round with guided public tours Wednesday through Sunday.

== Dey family history ==
In 1641 Dirck Janszen Siecken Dey, a soldier for the Dutch West India Company, of Denmark was the first of his family to settle in the colonies. His grandson Dirck Dey, a Denmark Dutch born planter, purchased 600 acres of land in Preakness Valley, now Wayne Township. By 1764 Dirck of Denmark passed the mansion onto his niece Denise. along with his wife, Hester Schuyler, raised ten children in the mansion. Theunis was a political figure who served on the state council by representing Bergen County and was a member of the charter trustee at Queens college, now Rutgers University. He also served as a colonel in the Bergen County Militia during the American Revolution. It was during his service in the militia that he came into contact with George Washington. This led to Theunis to offer his mansion to serve as Washington's headquarters in 1780.

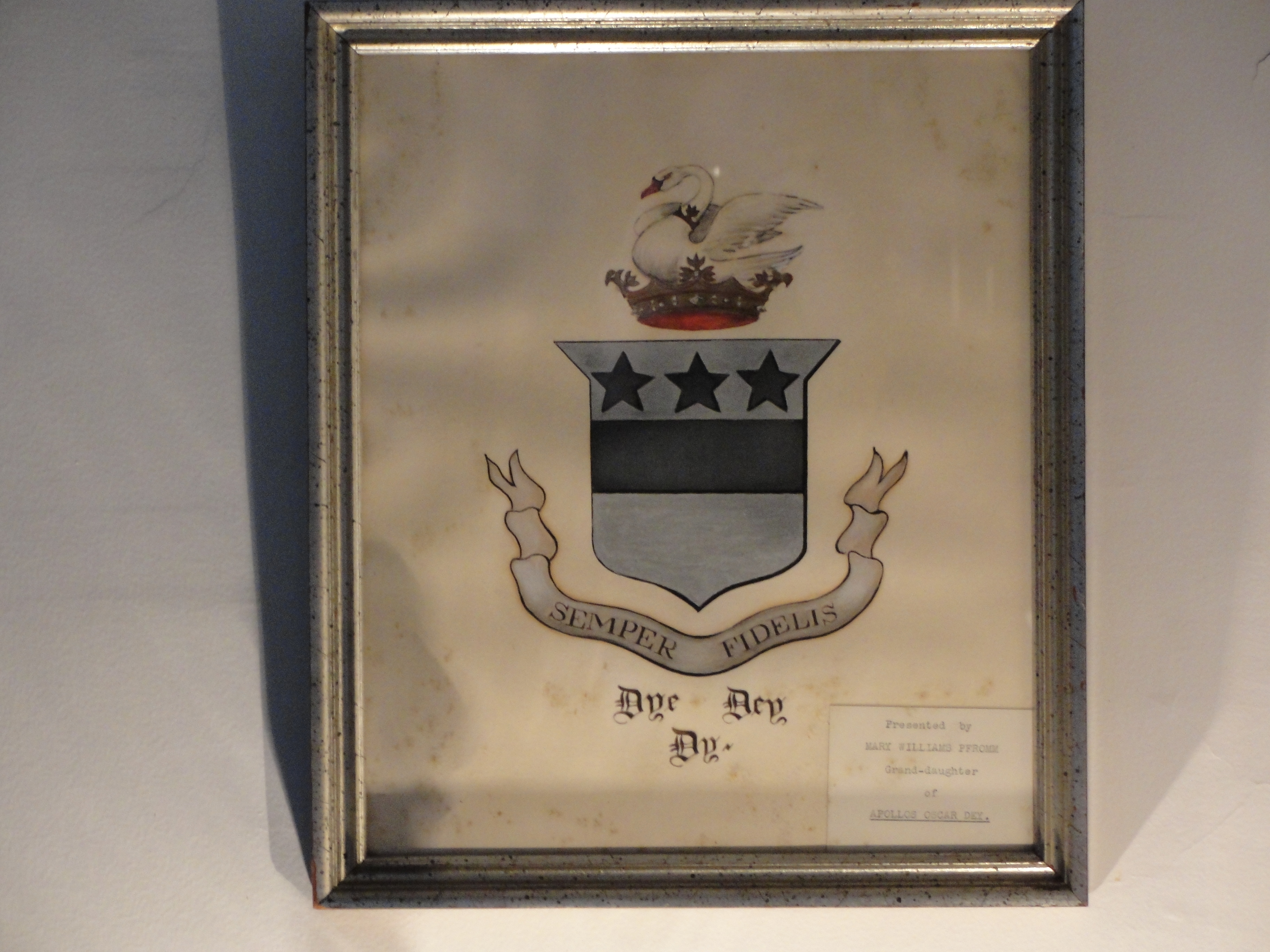
Dey Family Crest

== Washington's Preakness Valley Headquarters ==
George Washington stayed at the Dey Mansion during the American Revolution as one of his Headquarters. This area of the Preakness Valley was chosen because its location, as well as its abundance of food and forage in the surrounding area. On two separate occasions the Dey Mansion served as Headquarters for Washington, once from July 1 through July 28, 1780 and again from October 8 through November 27, 1780.

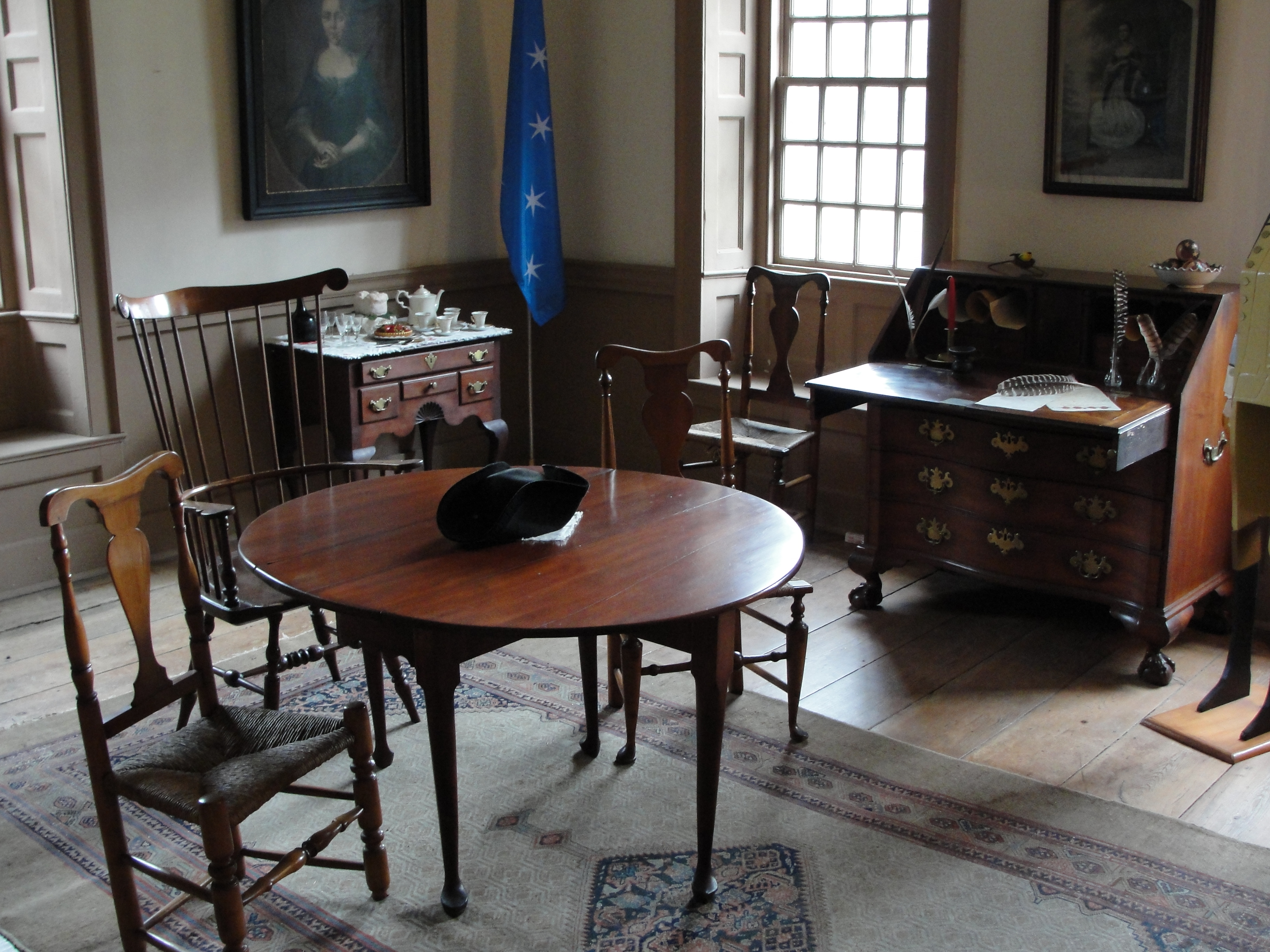
Washington's Office

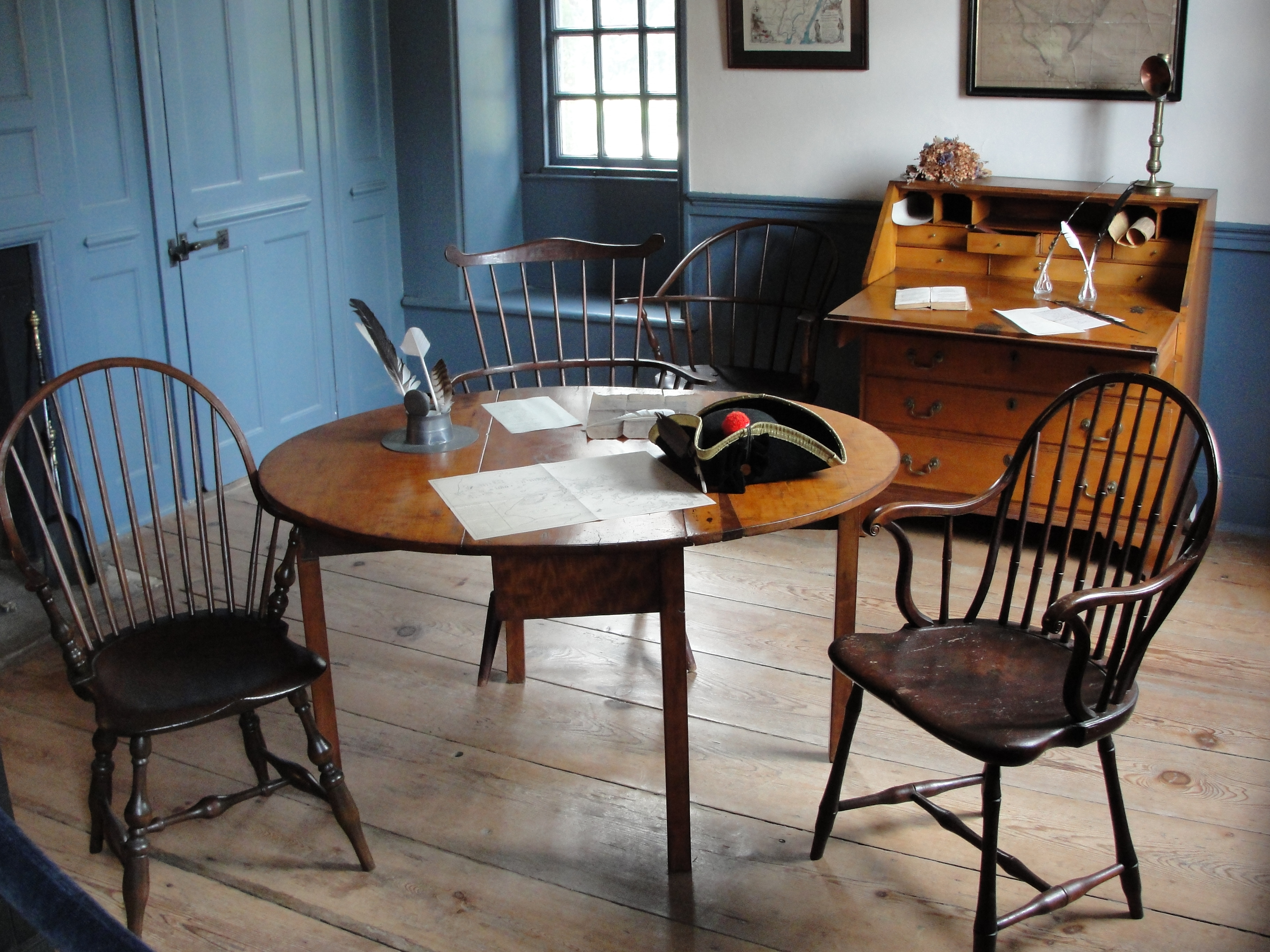
War Room

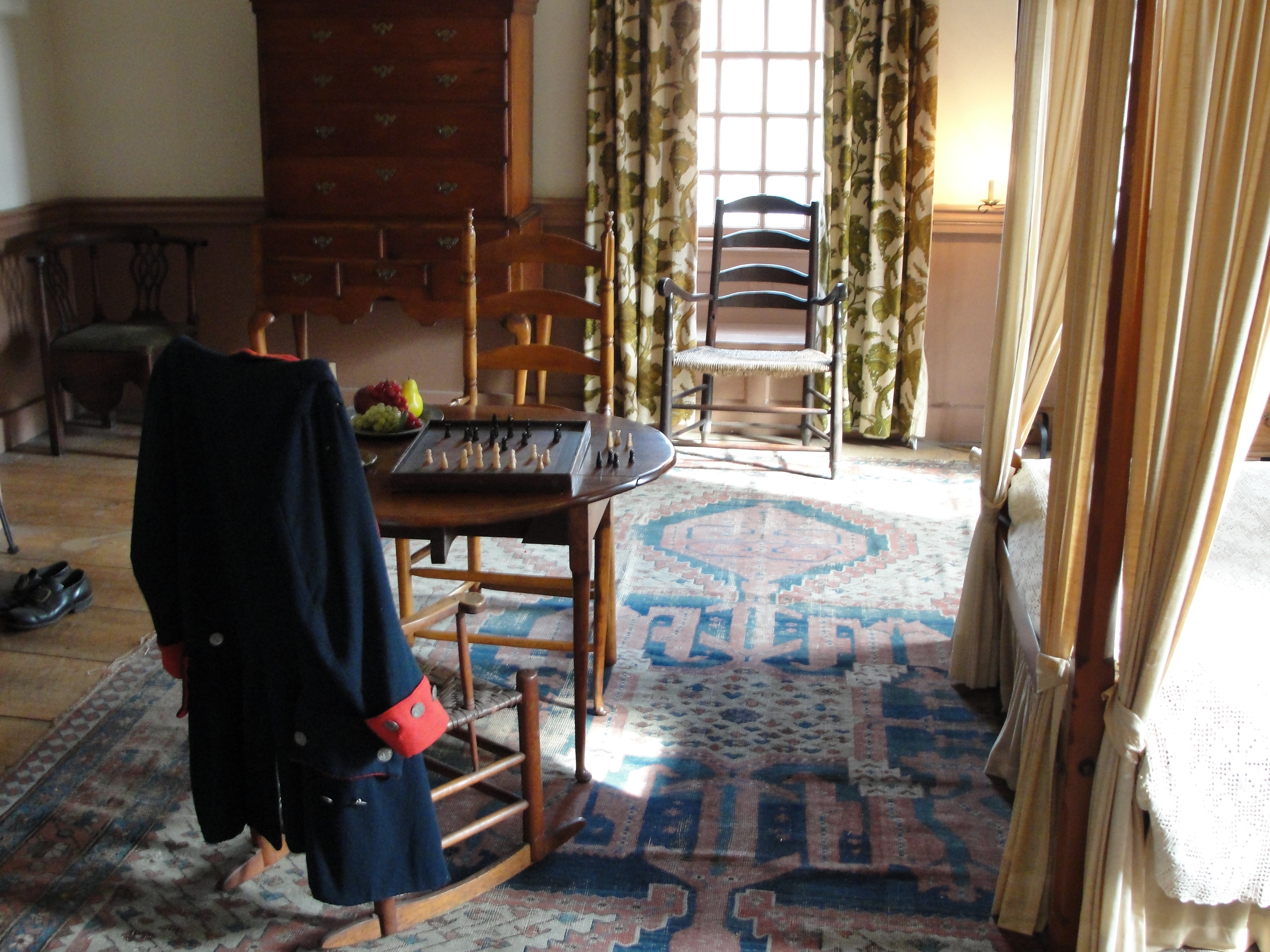
Washington's Bedroom

During his stay Washington and his advisers which included Alexander Hamilton, Robert H. Harrison, Tench Tilghman, David Humphreys and James McHenry used the four rooms on the south-eastern side of the mansion for their bedrooms as well as their military war rooms. Washington also had numerous visitors while at the Dey Mansion, those of which include the Marquis de Lafayette, General Anthony Wayne, Major General Lord Stirling, Benedict Arnold, General William Howe and the Marquis de Chastellux.

Washington's letters and correspondences during his time at the Dey Mansion totaled 964, for over 1800 written pages. One of which informed him on July 14, 1780, that the French allied support had landed at Newport, Rhode Island. Washington left on July 28 to join them. While at the mansion, Washington also issued the commission to West Point to Benedict Arnold, a respected soldier at the time.

As one of the five aides de camp at the Dey Mansion, Alexander Hamilton would write many letters, both for Washington and for personal reasons. While Washington was out of the mansion for the afternoon of July 21, Hamilton received an urgent letter from Elias Dayton regarding intelligence. This letter warned that the British had sent "fifty sails of transport" from New York for Rhode Island. Hamilton quickly drafted a letter and sent it to Lafayette in Connecticut and when Washington returned, Hamilton wrote another letter to Rochambeau with a warning. This intelligence information and quick response saved the French fleet and Continental soldiers.

Hamilton would also write many letters to his fiancé, Elizabeth Schuyler. The two had met that spring and were engaged to be married, but war delayed the ceremony. Hamilton was denied time off for a spring wedding, due to the campaigns and was forced to wait until December to be married. While waiting for the wedding, Hamilton wrote many romantic letters to Elizabeth, hoping she still desired to marry him.

During Washington's time away from the Dey Mansion Major, General Benedict Arnold's treason became evident and his accomplice Major John Andre was hanged in Tappan, New York on October 2. Fearing that the British commander Sir Henry Clinton would seek revenge, Washington moved his army once again to the Preakness Valley's Dey Mansion, and arrived on October 8, 1780. He stayed there until November 27, 1780, when he moved his headquarters and a portion of his army to Morristown, New Jersey. Alexander Hamilton would leave the Dey Mansion with Washington, but would travel to Albany, where he would wed Elizabeth Schuyler on December 14, 1780.

== Layout of the mansion and surrounding property ==
The Dey Mansion is of Georgian style architecture with English and Dutch influences, and was built on a 600-acre lot in Preakness Valley, now Wayne, New Jersey. The mansion was built facing the south in order receive sunlight. Each floor of the two story mansion features a long and wide center hall with multiple rooms on each side and an attic that spans the entire length of the mansion. The original kitchen was separate from the house and burned down sometime in the 19th century. A new kitchen was built next to the house as a WPA project in the 1930s, which accurately represents a colonial summer kitchen for a wealthy family. In the home today, a full restoration of the mansion was completed in 2016 however, most of the original wood frames and floors still exist. The mansion sits on the 377-acre property of the Preakness Valley Park, with features built onto the property, including a forge, plantation house, spring house, and a courtyard in the middle of the three buildings.

Today, Dey Mansion is set back about 200 feet from Totowa Road and sits within the larger Preakness Valley Park grounds, which are managed by Passaic County. The property includes walking paths and garden areas, while the main house is complemented by preserved outbuildings such as a forge, plantation house, and spring house.

== Dey Mansion through the years ==
Colonel Theunis Dey's grandson, General Richard Dey, sold the mansion and remaining 335 acres land in 1801. Since then sixteen different families have owned the mansion and land until the County of Passaic purchased it. Besides the Dey family, another family of notoriety to live here was the Hogencamp, who was the first mayor of Wayne Township. The family lived in the house for almost fifty years and is buried in the family cemetery on the property. Theunis Dey's daughter, Ann, is also buried in the family cemetery, but it's unknown if any other family members are buried here.

List of Family Owners from its Construction to Present

- 1740–1801: Dey
- 1801–1813: Neafie
- 1813–1861: Hogencamp
- 1861–1864: Yeoman
- 1864–1865: Gillen
- 1865–1866: Tainter
- 1866–1875: Millington
- 1875–1883: Howe
- 1883–1889: Heeseman
- 1889–1891: Islieb
- 1891–1892: Heeseman
- 1892–1901: Petry
- 1901–1902: Heeseman
- 1902–1906: Belcher
- 1906–1907: French
- 1907–1909: Murphy
- 1909–1912: Wright
- 1912–1918: Pfister
- 1918–1930: Alsheimer
- 1930–present: Passaic County Parks
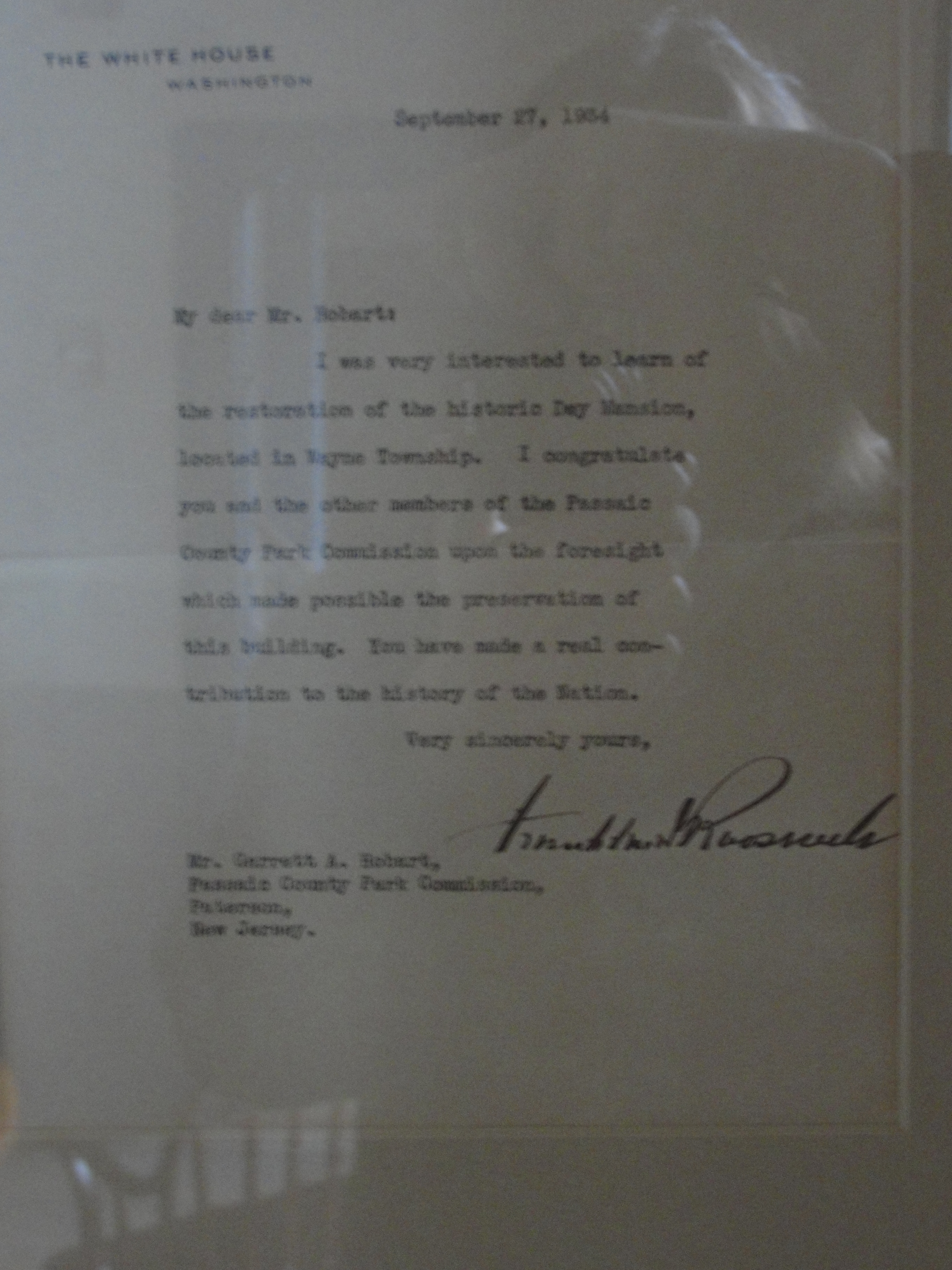
Letter from FDR regarding opening of Dey Mansion to visitors

On January 10, 1930, the Passaic County Parks Commission acquired the land, and on October 8, 1934, it was opened for visitors. Among the guests invited to its opening was President Franklin D. Roosevelt, and although he was unable to attend he wrote a letter in which he said, "You have made a real contribution to the history of the nation"(See picture of letter). In 1970 the Dey Mansion was entered into the New Jersey Register of Historic Places as well as the National Register of Historic Places. As of 1987 the Dey Mansion has been open to the public as a museum, and it is owned and operated by the County of Passaic Department of Cultural & Historic Affairs. It serves as a meeting place and reenactment center for many historic groups such as the Hester Schuyler-Colfax Chapter, Daughters of the American Revolution. On February 22, 2016, the newly restored Dey Mansion was rededicated by Passaic County.

== Gallery ==
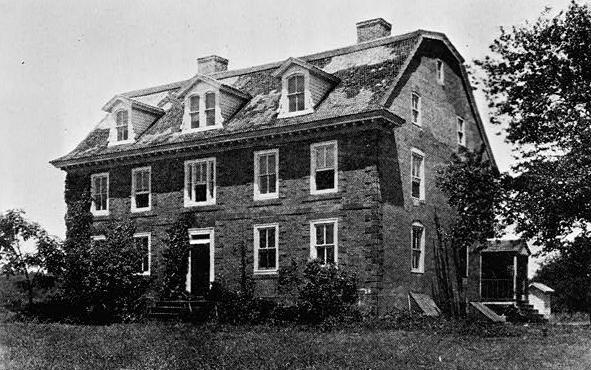
Before reconstruction in 1936

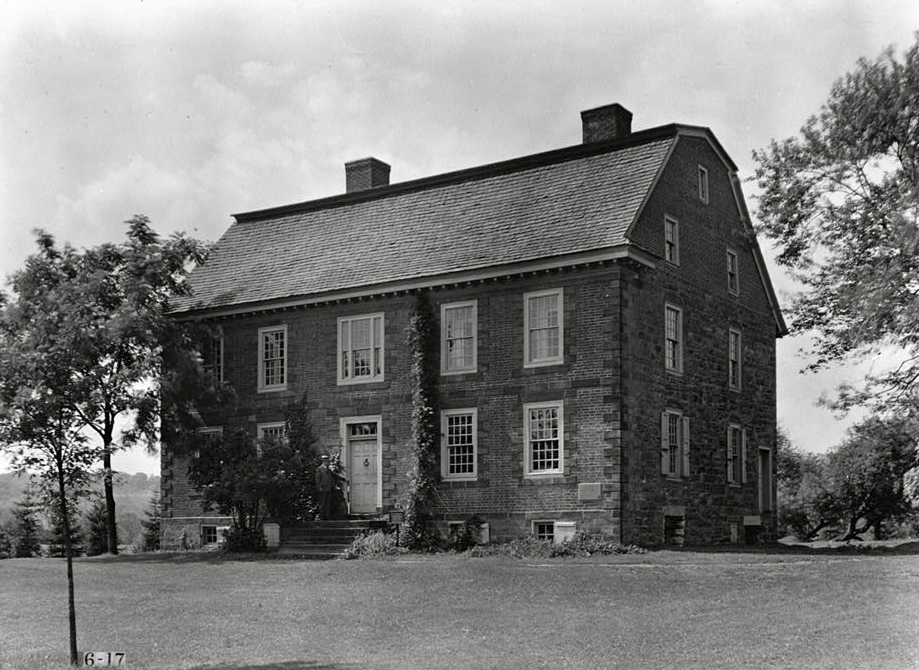
After reconstruction in 1936

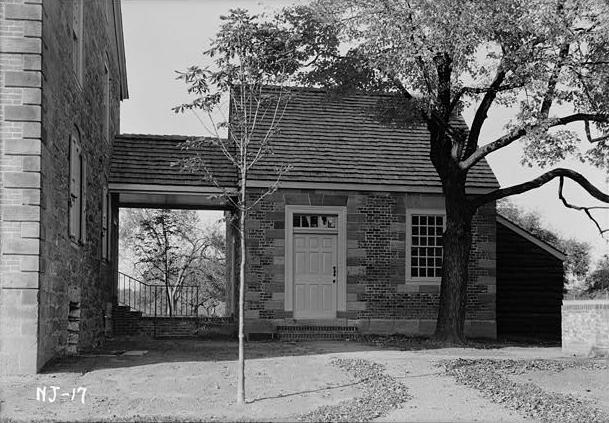
Exterior of added kitchen

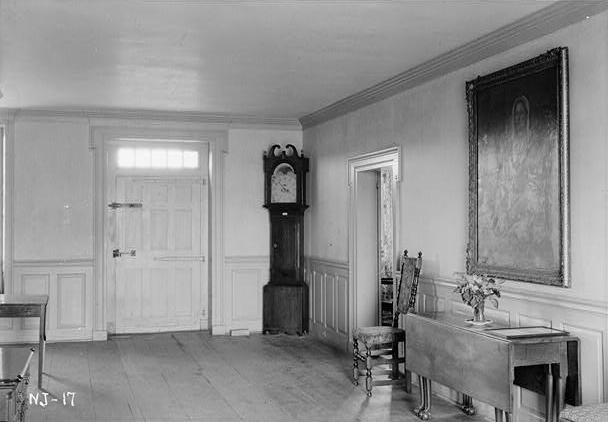
First floor hallway

== See also ==
- National Register of Historic Places listings in Passaic County, New Jersey
- Ford Mansion
- List of museums in New Jersey
- List of Washington's Headquarters during the Revolutionary War
- Preakness Valley
