= Blythe =

The name Blythe (/blaɪð/ or /blaɪθ/) derives from Old English bliþe ("joyous, kind, cheerful, pleasant"; modern blithe).

== People ==
- Blythe (given name), including a list of people named Blythe
- Blythe (surname), including a list of people with the surname Blythe

== Places ==
- Blytheville, Arkansas, United States
- Blythe, California, United States
- Blythe, Georgia, United States
- Blythe Township, Pennsylvania, United States
- Blythe Bay, Antarctica
- Blythe River, river in New Zealand
- Blythe River (Tasmania), river in Tasmania, Australia
- River Blithe, Staffordshire, United Kingdom
- River Blythe, Warwickshire, United Kingdom
- Blythe Hill Fields, London, United Kingdom
- Blythe Bridge, Staffordshire, United Kingdom

== Other ==
- Blythe (doll)

== See also ==
- Blyth (disambiguation)
- Blithe (disambiguation)
- Blyth River (Northern Territory)
- River Blyth (disambiguation)
