= Blyth =

Blyth may refer to:

== People ==
- Blyth (surname)
- Blythe (given name)
- Blythe (surname)

== Places ==
=== Australia ===
- Blyth, South Australia, a small town

=== Canada ===
- Blyth, Ontario, a village

=== United Kingdom ===
- Blyth, Northumberland, a town
  - Blyth (UK Parliament constituency), a former constituency
- Blyth, Nottinghamshire, a village
- Blyth Rural District, a former district of East Suffolk

== Other uses ==
- Baron Blyth, title in the UK peerage
- Blyth, Inc., a personal goods manufacturing and distribution company
- The Blyth Academy, Blyth, Northumberland, England
- Blyth Education, a Canadian company that runs a chain of private secondary schools

== See also ==
- River Blyth (disambiguation)
- Blythe (disambiguation)
- Blithe (disambiguation)
