= James Blyth =

James, Jim or Jimmy Blyth may refer to:

- James Blyth (engineer) (1839–1906), Scottish electrical engineer
- James Blyth, 1st Baron Blyth (1841–1925), English businessman and Liberal Party supporter
- James Blyth, Baron Blyth of Rowington (born 1940), Scottish businessman
- Jim Blyth (footballer, born 1890) (1890–?), Scottish footballer
- Jim Blyth (footballer, born 1911) (1911–1979), Scottish footballer
- Jim Blyth (footballer, born 1955), Scottish football goalkeeper
- Jimmy Blythe (1901–1931), American musician

== See also ==
- Blyth (disambiguation)
