= Blyth (surname) =

Blyth is a surname of Scottish origin. It is derived from the Old English pre 7th Century "blithe", meaning a happy or cheerful person.

Notable people with the surname include:

- Alan Blyth (1929–2007), English musicologist
- Alan Blyth (artist) (1921–1953), English painter
- Ann Blyth (1928–2026), American actress
- Sir Arthur Blyth (1823–1890), thrice Premier of South Australia
- Benjamin Blyth (1819–1866), Scottish civil engineer
- Benjamin Blyth II (1849–1917), son of the above, also a civil engineer
- Bob Blyth (1870–1941), Scottish football player and manager
- Chay Blyth (born 1940), Scottish yachtsman
- Edward Blyth (1810–1873), English zoologist
- Gavin Blyth (1969–2010), English television producer and journalist
- George Blyth (died 1914), Anglican Bishop
- Ian Blyth (born 1942), British Olympic swimmer
- James Blyth (1839–1906), Scottish electrical engineer
- James Blyth, 1st Baron Blyth (1841–1925), British businessman
- Sir James Blyth, Baron Blyth of Rowington (born 1940), British businessman
- Jim Blyth (footballer, born 1890), Scottish footballer (Dumbarton FC)
- Jim Blyth (footballer, born 1911), Scottish footballer (Tottenham Hotspur, Hull City, St Johnstone)
- Jim Blyth (footballer, born 1955), Scottish football goalkeeper (Coventry City, Scotland)
- John Blyth (died 1499), Bishop of Salisbury
- Len Blyth (1920–1995), Wales international rugby player
- Mark Blyth (born 1967), Scottish political scientist and professor at Brown University.
- Reginald Horace Blyth (1898–1964), English translator of and writer about haiku, and interpreter to the West of Asian culture
- Robert Henderson Blyth (1919–1970), Scottish landscape painter and artist
- Tom Blyth (born 1995), English actor

== See also ==
- Blyth (disambiguation)
- Blythe (given name)
- Blythe (surname)
