= Statue of John Bunyan, Bedford =

Bronze statue in Bedford, England

Coordinates: 52°08′20″N 0°28′00″W

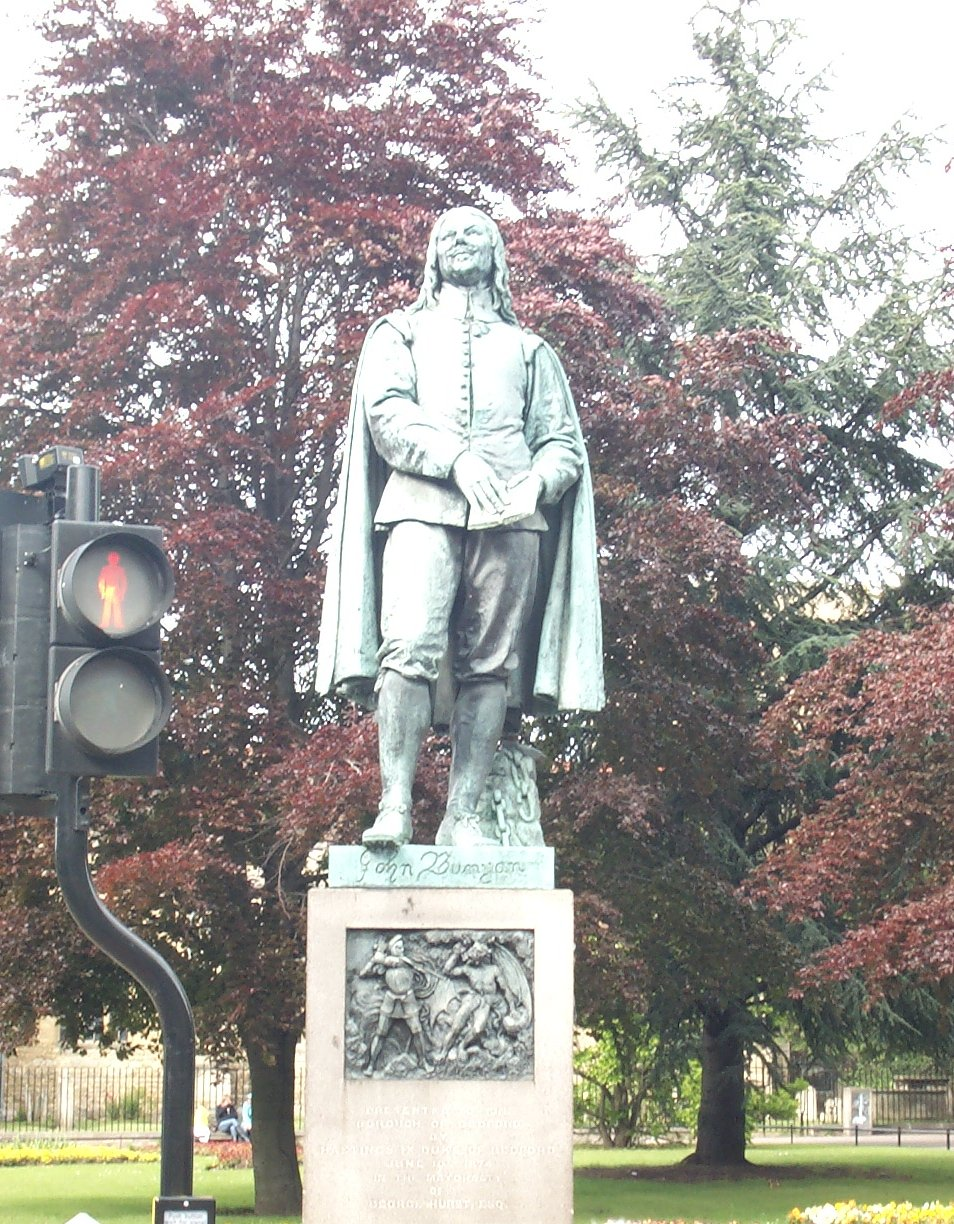
The statue, showing most of the plinth.

A bronze statue of John Bunyan stands on St Peter's Green, Bedford, England. The statue was sculpted by Sir Joseph Edgar Boehm, it was erected in 1874, and unveiled on 10 June of that year. The statue was commissioned by the Ninth Duke of Bedford (who also commissioned the bronze reliefs on the doors of the Bunyan Meeting Free Church) and presented by him to Bedford town.

== Location ==
The statue stands at the south-western corner of St Peter's Green, facing down Bedford's High Street. The site was selected by Boehm for its significance as a crossroads, and faces symbolically the site of his imprisonment. A ring of bollards connected by chains protect the base of the statue. A controlled crossing has resulted in the erection of a set of traffic lights extremely close to the statue.

== Subject ==
John Bunyan (1628-1688) was an English Christian writer and religious dissident, who was born, and lived in Bedfordshire and was twice imprisoned in Bedford County Gaol.

== Artist ==
Sir Joseph Edgar Boehm, Baronet (1834–1890) was a medallist and sculptor, born in Vienna to Hungarian parents. While several of Boehm's colossal statues are considered important, notably the statue of Queen Victoria, he is certainly well-known for the Bunyan piece. Boehm was later commissioned to produce the sarcophagus for Arthur Stanley, who addressed the guests at the unveiling ceremony, and was husband of Augusta Stanley who unveiled the Bunyan statue. He was also responsible for the statue of the Duchess of Bedford in the park at Woburn Abbey.

== Sponsor ==
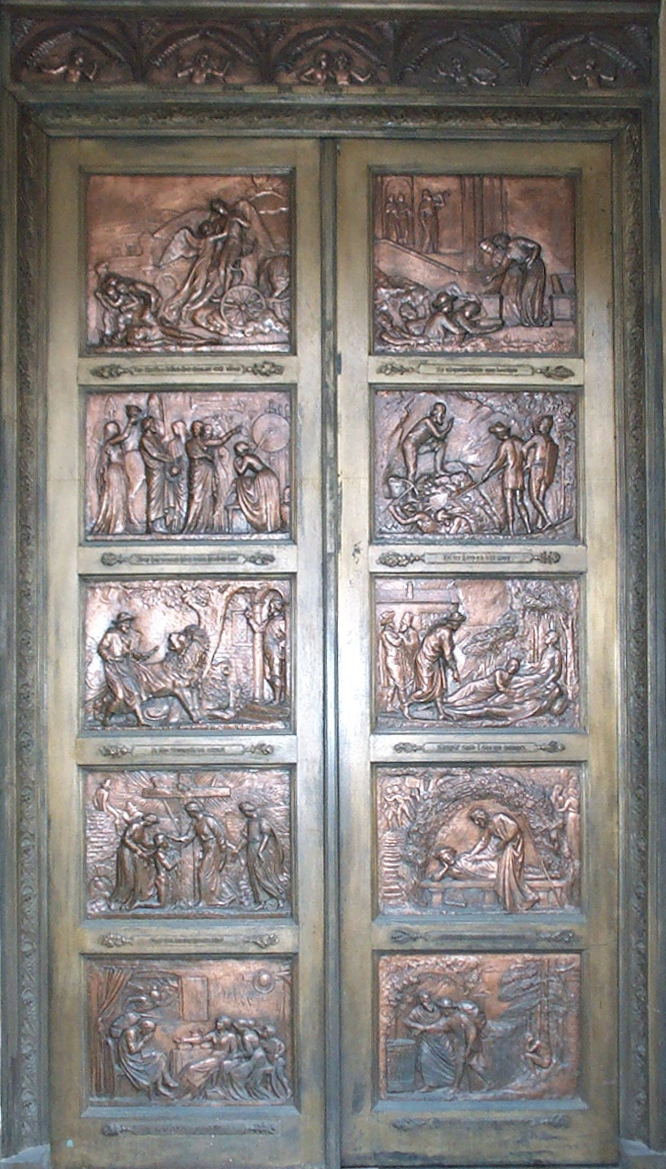
The doors of the Bunyan Meeting House.

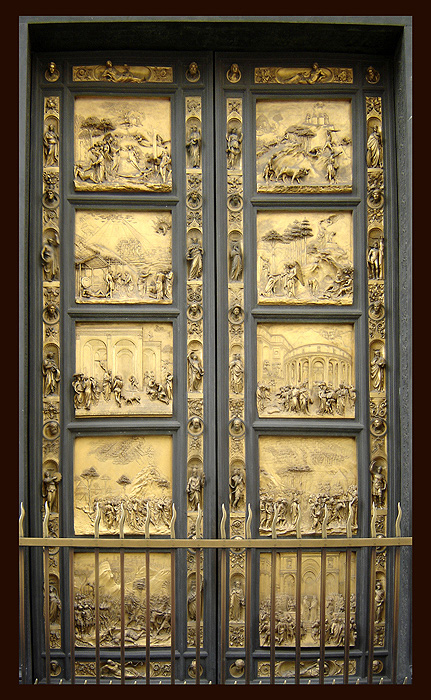
Gates of Paradise (replica), by Ghiberti in the Battistero di San Giovanni, the inspiration for the Bunyan doors.

Francis Charles Hastings Russell, Duke of Bedford (1819–1891) was an English nobleman, active in politics and agriculture, as well as the civic life of Bedford.

The Duke of Bedford had been active in civic life, and proposed the donation of the statue two years before the unveiling, when opening the Bedford Corn Exchange.

Two years later, in 1876, he donated the doors to the Bunyan Meeting House. The doors contain ten bas-relief panels, illustrating, like the panels on the base of the Bedford statue, scenes from the Pilgrims Progress. The design of the doors is based on the Gates of Paradise, by Ghiberti in the Battistero di San Giovanni in Florence. The Bunyan doors were executed by Fredrick Thrupp (1812-1895), in copper on bronze.

== Unveiling - the Bunyan Celebration of 1874 ==
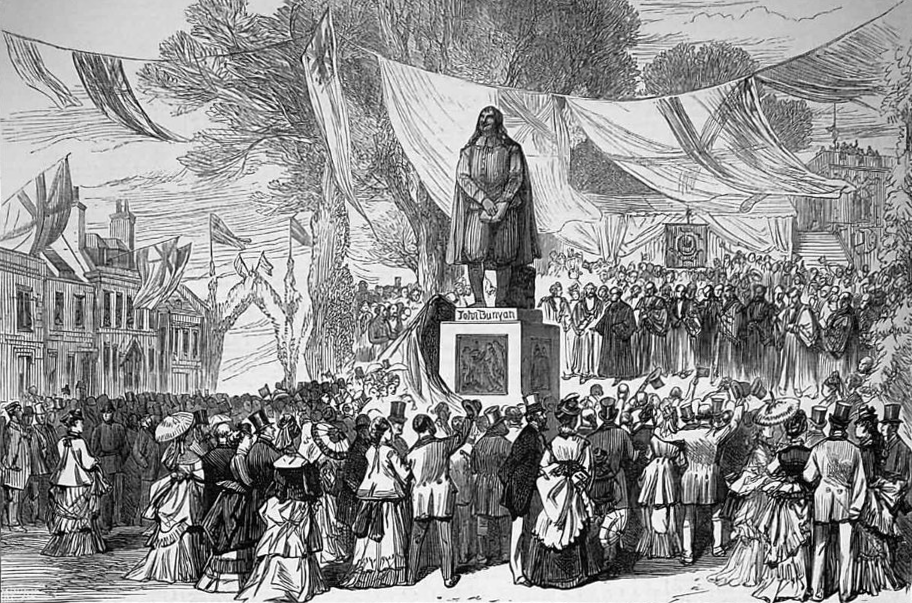
An engraving of the Bunyan Celebration of 10 June 1874, published in the Illustrated London News ten days later

The unveiling was a major event, called the Bunyan Celebration (or the Bunyan Festival), attended by people from across the United Kingdom, from the then colonies and from America. The day was treated as a holiday by all the nearby villages and Bunyan's birthplace, Elstow. Locally invitations went to all Sunday Schools, totalling 3,380 children who consumed a ton and a quarter of cake.

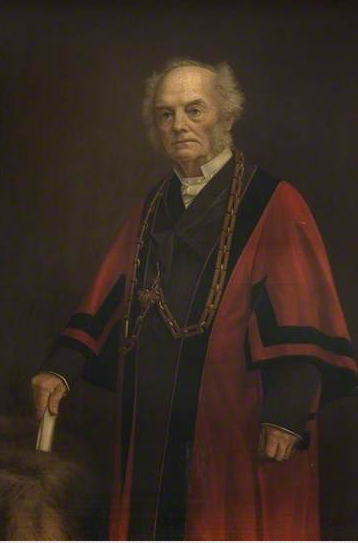
George Hurst, Mayor of Bedford

The statue was unveiled by Lady Augusta Stanley, wife of the then Dean of Westminster, Arthur Stanley (known as Dean Stanley), on Wednesday 10 June 1874, before a crowd of 10,000, presided over by the Mayor of Bedford (Alderman George Hurst). (Brown remarks that Augusta Stanley, as a Bruce of Elgin, was a direct descendant of the "noblemen who persecuted Bunyan and his people.") Sermons were preached, the church bells rung and a fire-work display was given.

The Dean of Westminster said in his address, at the celebration:

Every one of you who has not read The Pilgrim's Progress, if there be any such person, read it without delay: those who have read it a hundred times, read it for the hundred and first time. Follow out in your lives the lesson which The Pilgrim's Progress teaches, and then you will all of you be even better monuments of John Bunyan than this magnificent statue which the Duke of Bedford has given you.

The celebration was also addressed by Francis Cowper, 7th Earl Cowper, Lord Lieutenant of Bedfordshire, the member of Parliament (Samuel Whitbread), and Dr Brock and Dr Allon representing the Non-conformist movement.

In the evening a lecture on the life and works of Bunyan was given by Rev. C. M. Birrell of Liverpool, in the Bunyan Meeting House.

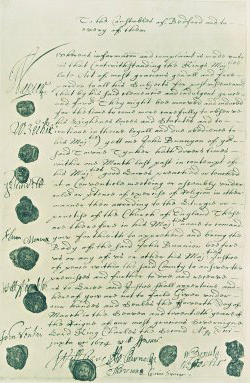
The will of John Bunyan, part of the special display

An exhibition of Bunyan relics, including Bunyan's will (now housed in the John Bunyan Museum) was on display in the hall of the Corn Exchange. The Mayor entertained seventy guests at a banquet.

The event was covered by much of the press including Daily News of the following day, and the Illustrated London News of 20 June, and documented in The Book of the Bunyan Festival, edited by William Howie Wylie.

Even Punch covered the unveiling:

Bunyan the Pilgrim, dreamer, preacher,
Sinner and soldier, tinker and teacher,
For heresy scoffed, scourged, put in prison—
The day of Tolerance yet un-arisen—
Who heard from the dark of his dungeon lair
The roar and the tumult of Vanity Fair,
Ans shadowed Man's pilgimrage forth with passion,
Heroic, in God-guided poet fashion,
Has now his revenge; he looks down at you
In a ducally-commissioned Statue

was part of Mr Punch's opinion.

A certain amount of discussion in the press revived an old idea that Bunyan had plagiarized the Pilgrims Progress from a work by a medieval French monk, Guillaume de Guileville, The Pylgrymage of the Sowle.

On 2 October 1874 the Illustrated London News reported that "A handsome illuminated address" from the Corporation of Bedford had been presented to the Duke of Bedford at Woburn Abbey, by a delegation headed by the mayor, in acknowledgement of his gift of the statue.

== Later history ==
In the twentieth century, according to Paddy Ashdown, red footprints were painted from the statue to a nearby ladies public convenience, and back to the plinth.

== Description ==
Bunyan is depicted in a two and a half ton bronze cloaked figure, preaching from an open Bible, to an invisible congregation, with a broken fetter representing his imprisonment by his left foot. The pose is reminiscent of one of the figures in the picture in the house of the Interpreter the Pilgrim's Progress, "...it had eyes uplift to Heaven, the best of Books in his hand, the law of Truth was written upon his lips...".

The figure, which incorporates a substantial base inscribed "John Bunyan" stands on a square plinth of Aberdeen granite. There are three bronze relief scenes from The Pilgrim's Progress set in the plinth: Christian at the wicket gate; his fight with Apollyon; and losing his burden at the foot of the cross of Jesus.

The three bronze reliefs depicting scenes from the Pilgrims Progress

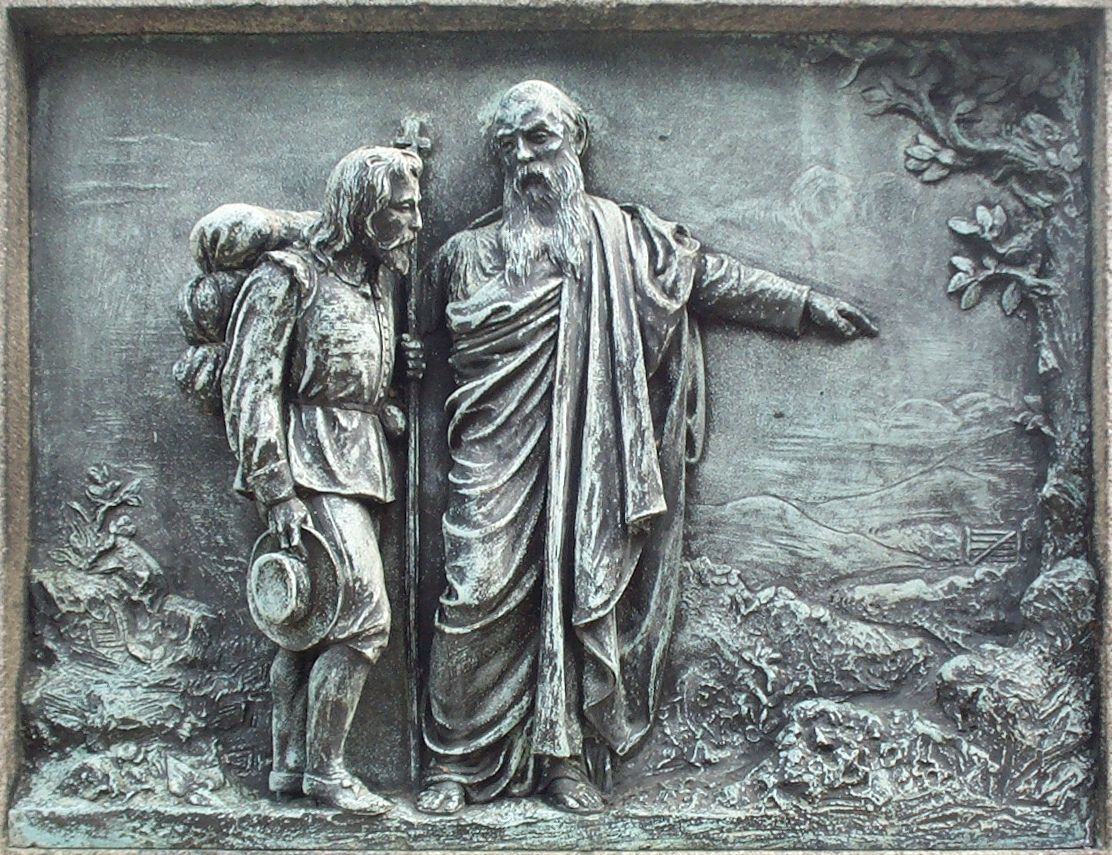
Christian at the wicket gate, talking to Evangelist

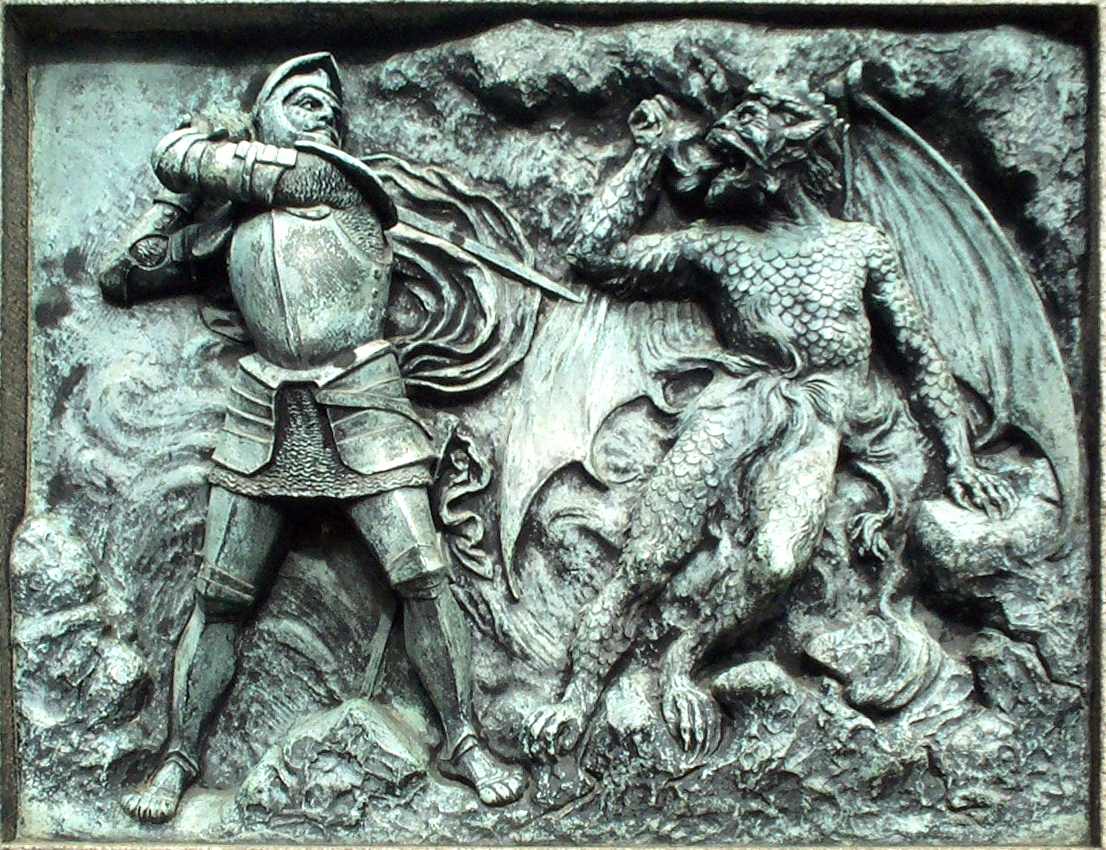
Christian battles Apollyon

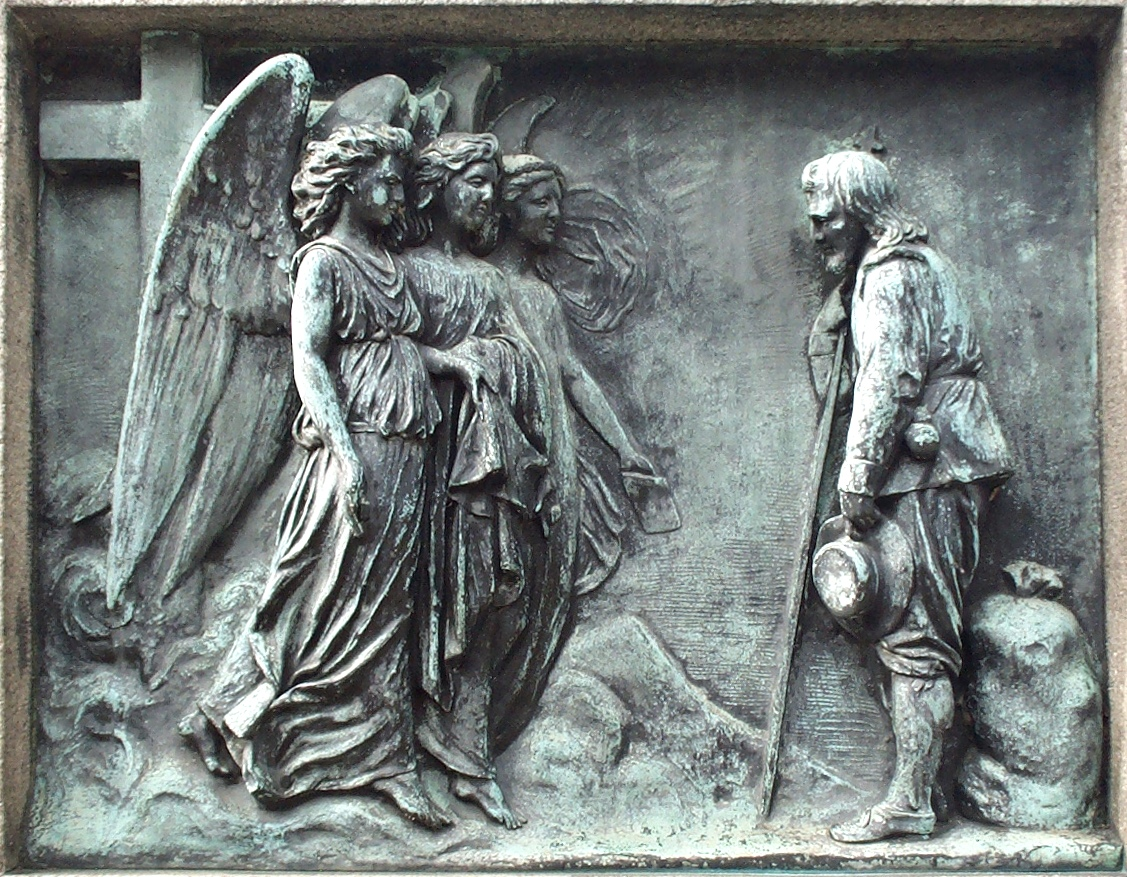
Christian lays down his burden

== See also ==
- John Bunyan Museum
- High Holborn
