= Blythe (given name) =

- Pronunciation: /ˈblaɪð/
- Gender: Primarily female
- Language: English

Origin
- Language: Old English
- Origin: From the surname
- Meaning: "Cheerful", "joyful", "pleasant"
- Region of origin: England

Other names
- Alternative spelling: Blyth; Blithe; Blith
- Related names: Blythe (surname), Blyth (surname)

Blythe is a primarily feminine given name from an Old English surname with the same spelling meaning "cheerful", "joyful", "pleasant", dating further back from the Proto-Germanic word blithiz, meaning "gentle", "kind". Variants of the name include Blyth, Blith, and Blithe.

Notable people with the name include:

== Women with the name ==
- Blythe Auffarth (born 1985), American actress
- Blythe Daley or Blyth Daly (1901–1965), British-born American actress
- Blythe Danner (born 1943), American actress
- Blythe Duff (born 1962), Scottish actress
- Blythe Hartley (born 1982), Canadian Olympic diver
- Blythe Loutit (1940–2005), founder member of the Save the Rhino Trust, artist and conservationist
- Blythe McGarvie, American business executive
- Blythe Metz (born 1977), American actress
- Blythe Wilson, Canadian actress

== Men with the name ==
- Blyth Tait (born 1961), New Zealand equestrian
- Blythe Walker (born 1968), Bermudian sailor

== Fictional characters ==
- Blythe, a supporting character in Netflix series You
- Blythe, the main character in the Vertigo comic book series Air
- Blythe Baxter, the main protagonist of the cartoon show Littlest Pet Shop
