= Joseph Edgar Boehm =

British sculptor (1834–1890)

Sir Joseph Edgar Boehm Bt, RA
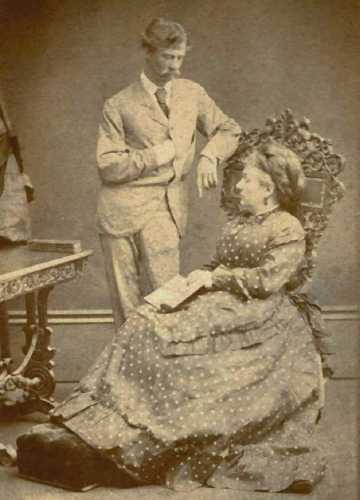
- Boehm with Princess Louise, about 1885
- Born: Josef Erasmus Bohm; 6 July 1834; Vienna, Austrian Empire
- Died: 12 December 1890 (aged 56); London, England
- Known for: Sculpture
- Spouse: Louisa Frances Boteler

Sir Joseph Edgar Boehm, 1st Baronet, RA (6 July 1834 – 12 December 1890) was an Austrian-born British medallist and sculptor, best known for the "Jubilee head" of Queen Victoria on coinage, and the statue of the Duke of Wellington at Hyde Park Corner. During his career Boehm maintained a large studio in London and produced a significant volume of public works and private commissions. A speciality of Boehm's was the portrait bust; there are many examples of these in the National Portrait Gallery. He was often commissioned by the Royal Family and members of the aristocracy to make sculptures for their parks and gardens. His works were many, and he exhibited 123 of them at the Royal Academy from 1862 to his death in 1890.

== Biography ==
Boehm (originally "Böhm") was born in Vienna of Hungarian parentage. His father, Josef Daniel Böhm, was a court medal maker and the director of the imperial mint in Vienna. From 1848 to 1851 Boehm studied in London at Leigh's academy of art, the forerunner of the Heatherley School of Fine Art. He then returned to Vienna where he studied model making and medal design at the Academy of Fine Arts before working in Italy and then, from 1859 to 1862 in Paris. In 1856, in Vienna, he was presented with the First Imperial Prize for Sculpture.

In 1862, Boehm settled in London, where he exhibited coins and medals at the 1862 International Exhibition, opened a studio and had his first work, a terracotta bust, shown at the Royal Academy. Throughout the 1860s, Boehm, who became a British subject in 1865, devoted his time to the production of portrait busts plus equestrian statues and statuettes. His portrait subjects included John Everett Millais, Stratford Canning and Charles Thomas Newton and Franz Liszt. Boehm's statuette of William Makepiece Thackeray, although completed after the author's death, was considered such a good likeness that several copies were made including examples for the Garrick Club and for the Athenaeum.

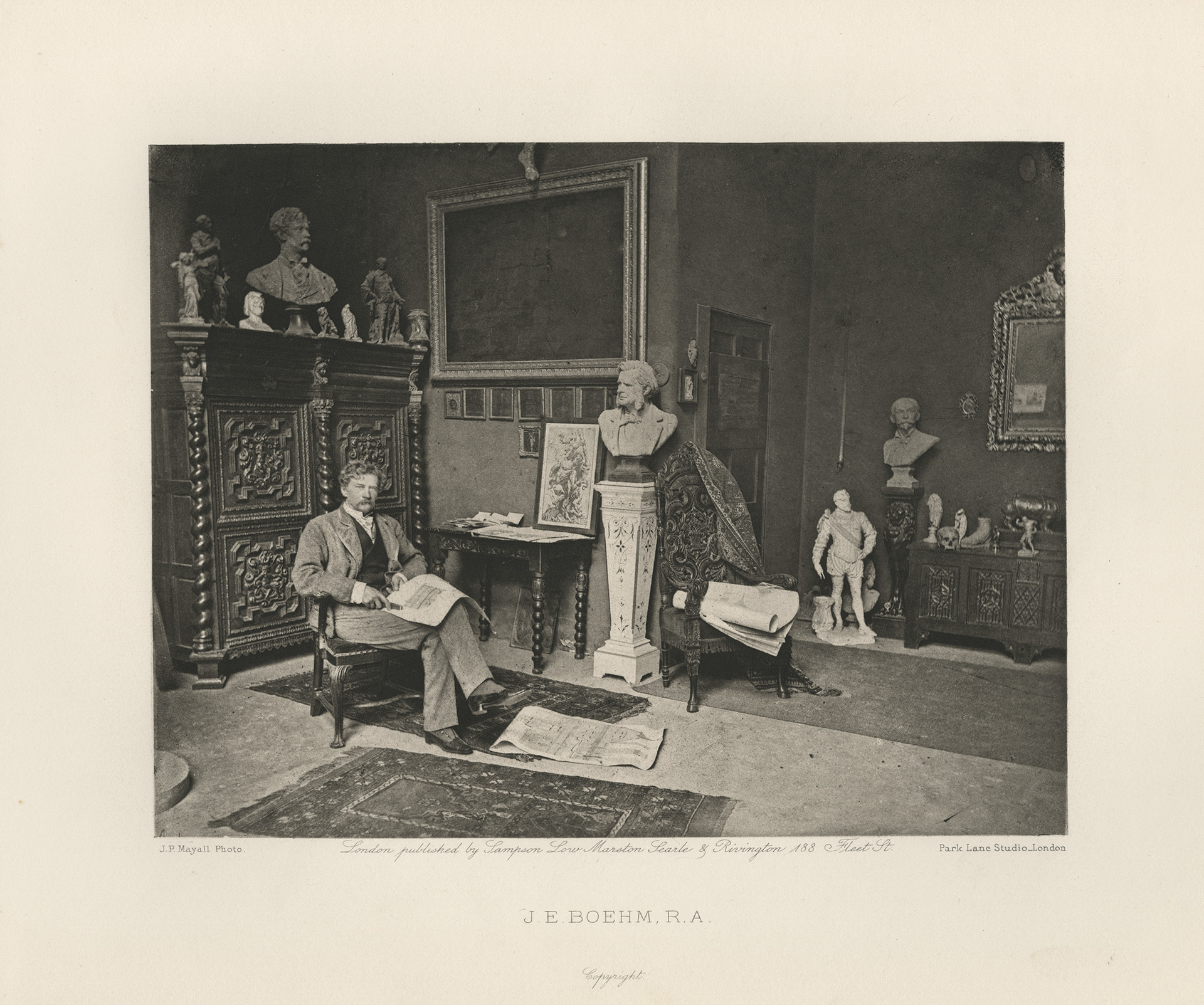
Boehm by J. P. Mayall from Artists at Home, published 1884

Boehm was often commissioned by members of the aristocracy to make equestrian and equine sculptures for the parks and gardens of their stately homes. His large sculpture of the stallion King Tom (1874) was commissioned by Baron Mayer Amschel de Rothschild for his new mansion, Mentmore Towers in 1873, and moved to Dalmeny House near Edinburgh in 1982. His large animal works include the marble Young Bull and Herdsman (1887) and Saint George and the Dragon (1885), both of which were exhibited at the Melbourne Centennial International Exhibition during 1888 and 1889. Both remain in Australia, the former at The Royal Agricultural Society of Victoria, Melbourne. The Horse and His Master (1874), sometimes known as A Clydesdale Stallion Rearing, in Malvern and Brueton Park in Solihull was exhibited at the Royal Academy in 1874 and at the 1878 Paris Universal Exposition. The work was bought by the grandson of Alfred Bird, Captain Oliver Bird for £300 in April 1944 and gifted to Solihull Council to place in one of their parks.

In 1869, Boehm's work came to the attention of Queen Victoria and he rapidly gained favour with the royal court. In 1871, he executed a statue of Victoria, in marble for Windsor Castle, which with the monument of the Prince Edward in St. George's Chapel in Windsor Castle, are considered his earliest great works. In total, throughout his career, Boehm completed over forty royal commissions. He won several commissions to create statues of Victoria to mark her Golden Jubilee, several of which were replica designs, which was a common and accepted practice at the time. Victoria made clear her approval of Boehm's work by unveiling his statues of her at Windsor and Balmoral which added to the appeal of his work to the local and colonial authorities who typically commissioned such monuments.

During his career Boehm maintained a large studio in London and produced a significant volume of work, including at least fifty-seven public statues and monuments. In total over 350 sculptures have been attributed to Boehm. In 1874 Boehm completed a substantial statue of John Bunyan (1628–1688) which was unveiled on 10 June at St Peter's Green, Bedford, by Lady Augusta Stanley, before a crowd of 10,000. There are many statues by Boehm in London. His equestrian statue of the Duke of Wellington at Hyde Park Corner, unveiled in 1888 was commissioned to compensate for the removal of the colossal sculpture of the Duke by Matthew Cotes Wyatt from the nearby Wellington Arch to Aldershot.

Boehm's designs were used on a series of medals minted to mark events in the Queen's reign. These included the Golden Jubilee, her Diamond Jubilee and for the Visit to Ireland Medal 1900. In 1887, Boehm designed and executed the model for the dies for a series of coins known as the Jubilee coinage, commemorating the 50th anniversary of Queen Victoria's reign. The coins are signed J.E.B. below the shoulder. This design was severely criticised by his peers as well as the public and was replaced in 1893. The coins depicted the royal arms in the Order of the Garter on the reverse. As a result, the sixpences were frequently gilded and passed off as gold half sovereigns. Therefore, the sixpence reverted to its standard design.

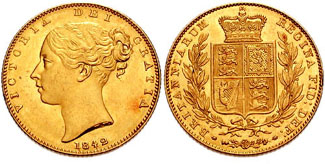
Queen Victoria, 1842 sovereign 662015

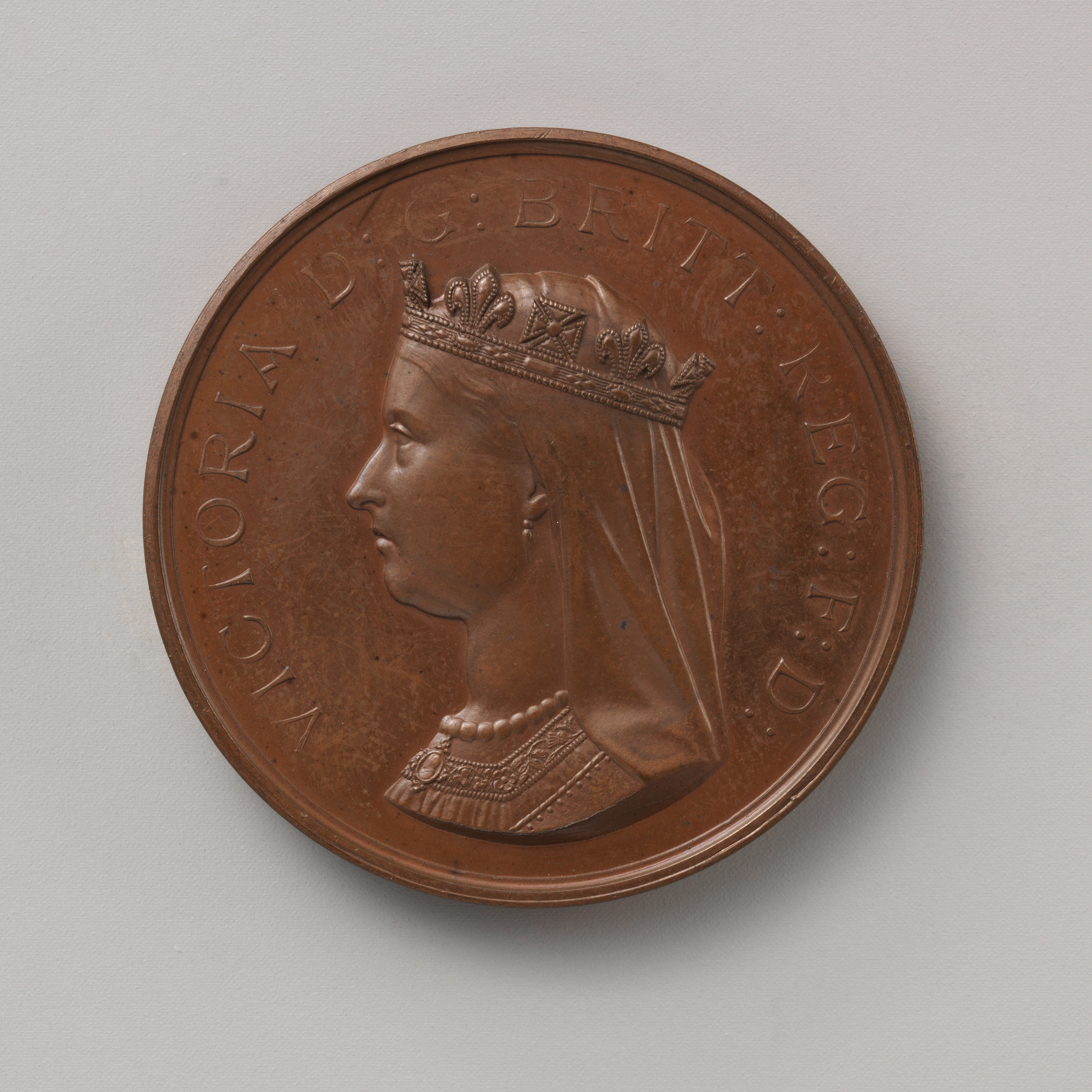
The New Zealand Medal, awarded after 1866

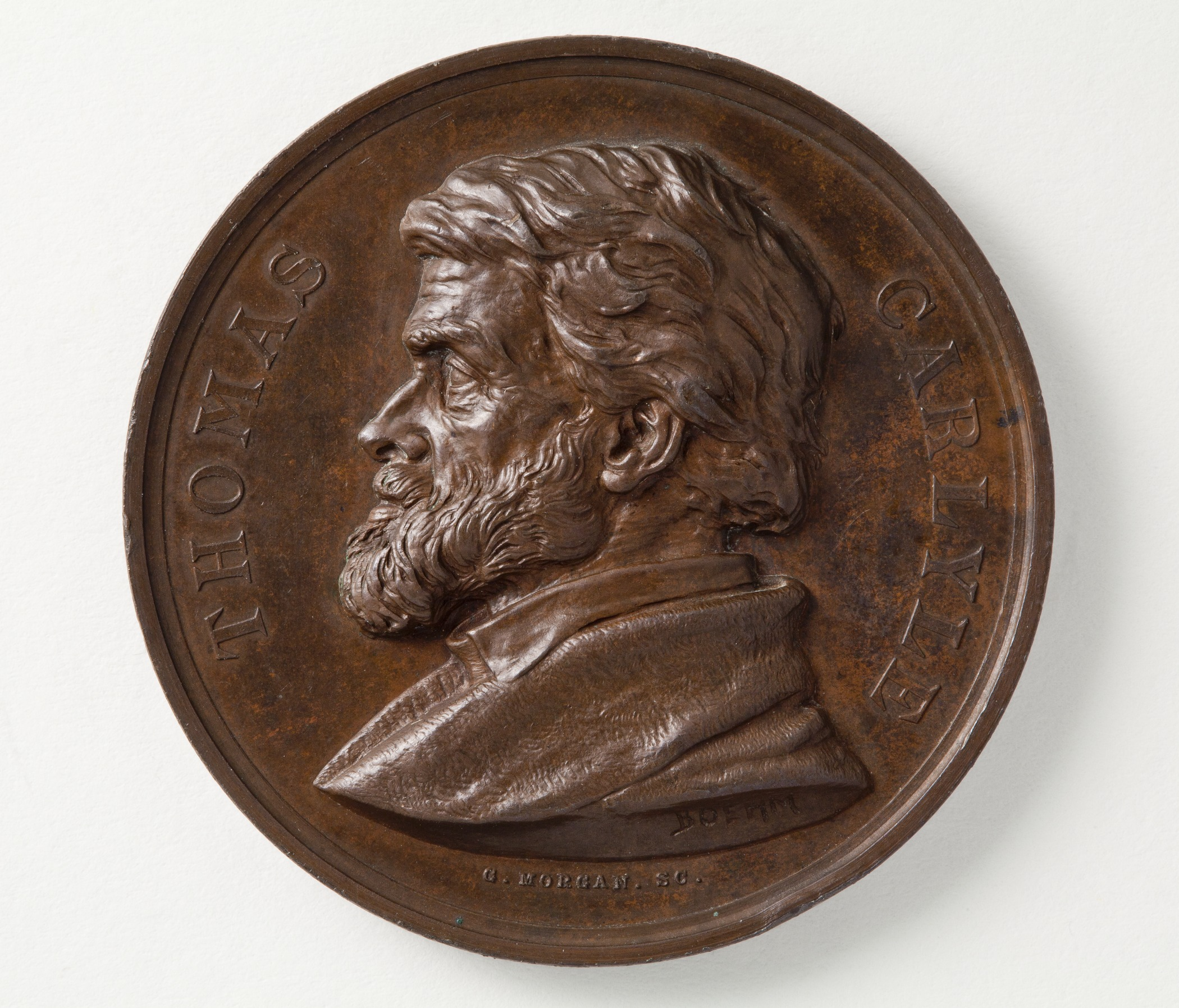
Commemoration Medal for Thomas Carlyle

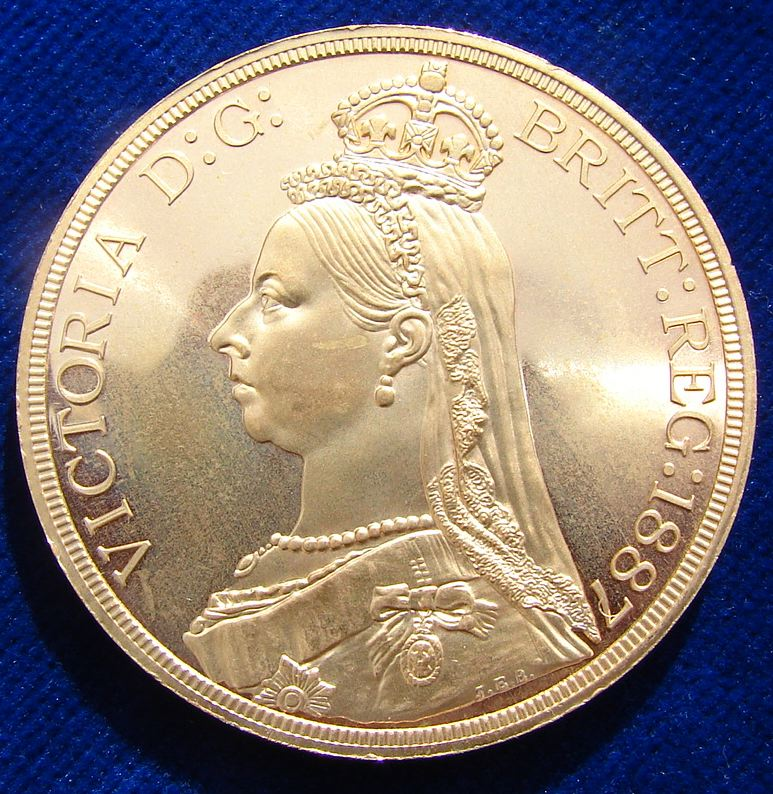
Queen Victoria crowned Jubilee head, 1887

Boehm's early portrait busts led, later in his career, to him undertaking a total of fifty-seven church monuments and memorial works, including several in British cathedrals. For the memorial to General Charles George Gordon in St Paul's Cathedral, he carved an effigy of Gordon recumbent on a sarcophagus. On the death of Dean Stanley, Boehm was commissioned to execute his sarcophagus in Westminster Abbey. The Abbey also houses Boehm's memorials to Lord Beaconsfield and to Viscount Canning, plus his marble statue of the Earl of Shaftesbury. His monument to Archbishop Tait is in Canterbury Cathedral. A number of Boehm's sculptures were reproduced in popular small-scale bronze editions. These included the soldier figures from the Wellington monument and a St. George and the Dragon group piece.

Boehm became an Associate of the Royal Academy in 1878, was appointed sculptor-in-ordinary to the Queen in 1881 and was elected a full member of the Royal Academy in 1882. In 1889, he was created a baronet, of Wetherby Gardens in the Parish of St Mary Abbots, Kensington (from 1883 Boehm lived at 25 Wetherby Gardens, a house designed for him by Robert William Edis and built by William Willett). Boehm encouraged and supported several younger artists and sculptors, most notably Édouard Lantéri, Alfred Gilbert and Alfred Drury. Boehm was instrumental in Gilbert being awarded the commission for the Shaftesbury Memorial Fountain in Piccadilly Circus while both Lantéri and Drury worked in Boehm's studio for a time. Boehm's most famous pupil was the Princess Louise, Duchess of Argyll, daughter of Queen Victoria. She was at his house, at 76 Fulham Road in London, when Boehm died suddenly on 12 December 1890, provoking press speculation about a sexual relationship between the two. According to historian Lucinda Hawksley, the two had a long-lasting love affair.

There is a memorial to Boehm in the crypt of St Paul's Cathedral in London.

== Public works ==
=== 1870–1879 ===
Image	Title / subject	Location and coordinates	Date	Type	Material	Dimensions	Designation	Wikidata	Notes
	Queen Victoria	Grand Vestibule, Windsor Castle	1871	Seated statue on pedestal	Marble	1.7m tall			
More images	Henry Vassall-Fox, 3rd Baron Holland	Holland Park, London	1872	Seated statue on pedestal	Bronze & granite		Grade II	Q27080877	Work by George Frederic Watts with assistance from Boehm. Relocated from Kensington High Street, 1926.
More images	King Tom	Dalmeny House, near Edinburgh	1873	Equine statue on plinth	Bronze				Originally erected at Mentmore Towers, relocated to Dalmeny in 1982
More images	Statue of John Bunyan	St Peter's Street, Bedford	1874	Statue on pedestal with panels	Bronze and granite		Grade II	Q18162531	
More images	The Horse and His Master	Malvern and Brueton Park, Solihull	1874	Equestrian statue group on pedestal	Bronze and stone		Grade II	Q26626782	
	Horse and Groom	Stable Yard, Eaton Hall, Cheshire	c. 1875	Equestrian statue group on pedestal	Bronze and granite		Grade II	Q26429540	
	Elizabeth Russell, Duchess of Bedford	South of Sculpture Gallery, Woburn Abbey, Bedfordshire	1875	Statue on pedestal	Gilded bronze & marble		Grade II	Q26607552	
More images	Eurydice	Victoria and Albert Museum, London	1875-80	Statue	Marble				
More images	John Fox Burgoyne	Waterloo Place, London	1877	Statue on pedestal	Bronze and stone		Grade II	Q26319140	
	Leopold I of Belgium	St George's Chapel, Windsor Castle	1878	Deep relief sculpture group	Marble		Grade I		
More images	John Russell, 1st Earl Russell	Westminster Abbey, London	After 1878	Bust	Marble				
More images	Edward VII	Jijamata Udyaan, Mumbai	1879	Equestrian statue on pedestal	Bronze				Statue shows the then Prince of Wales in the uniform of a colonel of the 10th Royal Hussars
	William Ewart Gladstone	British Museum	1879	Bust	Parian ware	440mm high			Manufactured by Wedgwood in a commercial subscription edition in both Parian and black basalt.

=== 1880–1884 ===
Image	Title / subject	Location and coordinates	Date	Type	Material	Dimensions	Designation	Wikidata	Notes
More images	John Russell, 1st Earl Russell	Central Lobby, Palace of Westminster, London	1880	Statue on pedestal	Marble				
More images	Queen Victoria	Temple Bar, London	1880	Statue in niche	Stone		Grade II		
More images	Edward, Prince of Wales	Temple Bar, London	1880	Statue in niche	Stone		Grade II		
More images	Memorial to George Whyte-Melville	Market Street, St Andrews	1880	Fountain with four medallions	Granite		Category B	Q17799487	Medallions by Boehm, architect, Robert William Edis with sculptures by Thomas Earp
More images	Stratford Canning	North transept, Westminster Abbey, London	After 1880	Statue on pedestal	Marble				
	William Ewart Gladstone	National Art Library, Victoria and Albert Museum, London	1881	Bust	Plaster	56cm high			
More images	Thomas Carlyle	Chelsea Embankment Gardens, London	1882	Seated statue on pedestal	Bronze and red granite		Grade II	Q26355706	
	John Brown	Balmoral Estate, Aberdeenshire	1883	Statue on pedestal	Bronze		Category A	Q17574620	
	Henry John Stephen Smith	Oxford University Museum of Natural History	1883	Bust	Marble				
More images	Francis Drake	Plymouth Road, Tavistock, Devon	1883	Statue on pedestal with panels	Bronze and granite		Grade II	Q26611707	
More images	Francis Drake	Plymouth Hoe, Plymouth	1884	Statue on pedestal	Bronze and granite		Grade II*	Q17554612	Replica of the 1883 Tavistock statue.
More images	William Tyndale	Victoria Embankment Gardens, London	1884	Statue on pedestal	Bronze and Portland stone	3.6m tall	Grade II	Q27084838	
More images	Benjamin Disraeli	North transept, Westminster Abbey, London	1884	Statue on pedestal	Marble				
More images	Arthur Penrhyn Stanley	Henry VII's Chapel, Westminster Abbey, London	1884	Altar tomb with effigy	Alabaster and marble				

=== 1885–1889 ===
Image	Title / subject	Location and coordinates	Date	Type	Material	Dimensions	Designation	Wikidata	Notes
More images	Archibald Campbell Tait	Canterbury Cathedral	1885	Cenotaph effigy	Marble				
More images	Charles Darwin	Natural History Museum, London	1885	Seated statue	Marble				
More images	Michael Thomas Bass	Wardwick, Derby	1885	Statue on pedestal with panel	Bronze and stone		Grade II	Q26523638	
More images	John Lawrence, 1st Baron Lawrence	Waterloo Place, London	1885	Statue on pedestal	Bronze and granite	2.6m tall	Grade II	Q26319142	
	Memorial Fountain to Herbert Stewart	Hans Place, Knightsbridge, London	1886	Relief medallion on drinking fountain	Bronze				Fountain by Joseph Whitehead
	Queen Victoria	Balmoral Estate, Aberdeenshire	1887	Statue on pedestal	Bronze and granite		Category A	Q17574625	.
	Stafford Northcote, 1st Earl of Iddesleigh	Northernhay Gardens, Exeter	1887	Statue on pedestal	Stone and granite		Grade II	Q26557993	
More images	Queen Victoria	Castle Hill, Windsor, Berkshire	1887	Statue on pedestal with panels	Bronze and granite		Grade II	Q26570416	
More images	Albert, Prince Consort	Windsor Great Park, Berkshire	1887	Equestrian statue on pedestal	Bronze and granite		Grade II	Q26609381	
More images	Queen Victoria	Queen's Square, Sydney, Australia	1888	Statue on pedestal					
More images	St George and the Dragon	Outside the State Library of Victoria, Melbourne, Australia	1888	Equestrian sculpture group on pedestal	Bronze and stone				
More images	Statue of Arthur Wellesley, 1st Duke of Wellington	Hyde Park Corner, London	1888	Equestrian statue on pedestal with figures	Bronze and stone		Grade II	Q18159875	
More images	Statue of Queen Victoria	College Green, Bristol	1888	Statue on pedestal with panels	Marble, granite and bronze		Grade II	Q7270543	
More images	John Elder	Elder Park, Govan, Glasgow	1888	Statue on pedestal	Bronze and granite		Category B	Q17811104	
More images	Walter Montagu Douglas Scott, 5th Duke of Buccleuch	West Parliament Square, Edinburgh	1888	Statue on pedestal and decorated tiers	Bronze and stone		Category A	Q17570712	Architect: Sir Robert Rowand Anderson, decoration on pedestal and tiers by various sculptors
More images	Anthony Ashley-Cooper, 7th Earl of Shaftesbury	Westminster Abbey, London	1888	Statue on pedestal	Marble				
More images	Charles Darwin	Westminster Abbey, London	1888	Bust in roundel	Bronze				
More images	Queen Victoria	Imperial College, London	1888	Statue	Marble				
More images	General Charles George Gordon	St Paul's Cathedral, London	c. 1885	Effigy with panel on plinth	Bronze, marble, brass & stone				
More images	Sir Herbert Stewart	St Paul's Cathedral, London	c. 1885	Relief panel	Bronze				

=== 1890 and later ===
Image	Title / subject	Location and coordinates	Date	Type	Material	Dimensions	Designation	Wikidata	Notes
	Queen Victoria	Langalibalele Street, Pietermaritzburg, South Africa	1890	Statue on pedestal	Marble and stone				
More images	Robert Napier, 1st Baron Napier of Magdala	Queen's Gate, Kensington, London	1891, relocated 1921	Equestrian statue on pedestal	Bronze and granite		Grade II	Q26555957	
	Equine statue	Waddesdon Manor, Buckinghamshire	1890–1891	Equine statue on pedestal	Bronze and stone		Grade II	Q26453053	Modelled from an earlier version of Copenhagen and recycled for Baron Ferdinand de Rothchild.
More images	Thomas Carlyle	Ecclefechan, Dumfries and Galloway	1929	Seated statue on pedestal	Bronze and stone		Category B	Q17804310	Replica of Boehm's 1882 original cast by MacDonald & Creswick of Edinburgh

=== Other works ===
- The Victoria and Albert Museum in London holds several plaster and terracotta pieces by Boehm plus a bronze figure, Herdsman with Bull, and also a terracotta statuette of Thomas Carlyle
- Marble busts of Charles Thomas Newton, from 1863, and of Austen Henry Layard, from 1890, both in the British Museum collection
- Bronze statue of Thomas Baring, 1st Earl of Northbrook, Old Flagstaff House, Barrackpore, India
- Bronze statue of Queen Victoria, a replica of the Windsor Castle statue, erected 1887, Chapeauk Park, Chennai
- Statue of Robert Napier, 1st Baron Napier of Magdala, completed 1880, Barrackpore, India
- Marble bust of Lady Reay, Fanny Georgiana Jane McKay née Hasker, 1890, the Cama and Albless Hospital, Mumbai
- Bronze statue of Lord Dufferin, 1891. Removed from its original site on Dufferin Road, Kolkata, in the early 1970s to an unknown location
- Statue of Ashley Eden, erected in 1887 in Dalhousie Square, Kolkata, and removed during the 1970s
- Marble statue, c. 1882, of John Lawrence, 1st Baron Lawrence, a former Viceroy of India, originally erected in London to some criticism, such that Boehm donated the statue to Lahore. In due course the statue, which shows Lawrence holding both a pen and a sword and has the inscription 'Will you be governed by the pen or the sword ?' was relocated to Foyle College in Ireland.
- Bust of Frank Holl in the Crypt of St Paul's Cathedral, London
- Marble effigy of Walter Montagu Douglas Scott, 5th Duke of Buccleuch in St Mary's Church, Dalkeith begun by Boehm and completed by Alfred Gilbert in 1892.
- Marble statue of Louisa Beresford, Marchioness of Waterford in Highcliffe Castle, Highcliffe, Dorset. Commissioned by her friends and delivered in 1875
- Two angels in marble in St Bartholomew's Church, Corsham, Wiltshire as a memorial to Lady Methuen, wife of the owner of Corsham Court. The plaster models are at the court. It is believed these were delivered in 1875.
- Marble effigy on tomb chest of Juliana, Countess of Leicester, commissioned by her husband Thomas Coke, 2nd Earl of Leicester and erected in St Withburga's Church, Holkham, Norfolk c.1871.

Preceded by Leonard Charles Wyon	Coins of the pound sterling Obverse sculptor 1887	Succeeded by Thomas Brock
Baronetage of the United Kingdom
New creation	Baronet (of Wetherby Gardens); 1889–1890	Succeeded by Edgar Collin Boehm-Boteler
