= John Blythe =

John Blyth, Blithe or Blythe may refer to:

== Actors ==
- John Sidney Blyth (1882–1942), birth name of American actor John Barrymore
- John Blythe (actor) (1921–1993), English actor

== Politicians ==
- John Blithe (MP) (before 1365 – 1410), English politician
- John Blythe (Jamaican politician) (died 1830s), member of the House of Assembly of Jamaica in 1820; father of John Buddle Blyth
- John Blythe (Canadian politician) (1842 – after 1890), Canadian politician

== Religious figures ==
- John Blithe (priest) (before 1450 – after 1478), English Archdeacon of Stow and Lindsey 1477–78
- John Blyth (bishop) (before 1460 – 1499), English Bishop of Salisbury 1493–99

== Others ==
- John Buddle Blyth (1814–1871), Jamaican-born chemist, first professor of chemistry at Queen's College Cork in Ireland
- John Dean Blythe (1842–1869), English writer
- John Blythe (footballer) (1924–2007), English centre half

== See also ==
- John Drew Barrymore or John Blyth Barrymore, Jr. (1932–2004), American actor, son of John Barrymore
- John Blyth Barrymore III (born 1954), American actor, son of John Drew Barrymore
