= Ladywalk Reserve =

Nature reserve in Warwickshire, England

- Interactive map of Ladywalk Reserve
- Coordinates: 52.52456°N 1.68602°W
- Created: 1971
- Operator: West Midland Bird Club
- Website: westmidlandbirdclub.org.uk/www02/ladywalk.html

Ladywalk Reserve is a nature reserve on the River Tame, at its confluence with the River Blythe, at Hams Hall in north Warwickshire, England, owned by Powergen, but leased to, and operated by, the West Midland Bird Club since 1971.

The reserve is best known for its overwintering great bitterns. Entry is by permit only.
