= Lady Augusta Stanley =

English aristocrat (1822–1876)

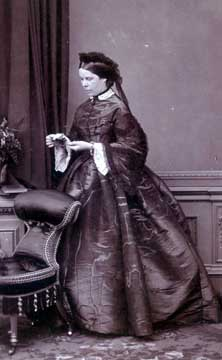
Augusta Stanley

Lady Augusta Elizabeth Frederica Stanley (3 April 1822 – 1 March 1876), was a british courtier, daughter of Thomas Bruce, 7th Earl of Elgin and Elizabeth Oswald. She served as lady-in-waiting to Queen Victoria, and many of her letters are preserved.

== Life and career ==
She was brought up in Paris after her father died. She served as lady-in-waiting to Queen Victoria’s mother from 1846 until 1861. After the death of the Duchess of Kent in 1861 she was appointed Victoria’s Resident bed-Chamber woman, but de facto as a live-in secretary and assistant, and was to become the queen's friend.

She met and married Arthur P. Stanley, Dean of Westminster at the home of Mary Elizabeth Mohl in Paris. The wedding took place in December 1863.

After her marriage, she was appointed ‘extra woman of the bedchamber’ to the queen, and while no longer living at court, she often attended court in this capacity. She unveiled Joseph Edgar Boehm's statue of John Bunyan in Bedford in 1874.

Lady Augusta is buried alongside her husband in the Henry VII Lady Chapel at Westminster Abbey. A memorial in her honour was commissioned by Queen Victoria and stands at Frogmore.

== Bibliography ==
Some of Stanley's letters are published in Letters of Lady Augusta Stanley: A Young Lady at Court 1849-1863 edited by the Dean of Windsor and Hector Bolitho.
