= Malvern and Brueton Park =

Town park and local nature reserve in Solihull in the West Midlands, England

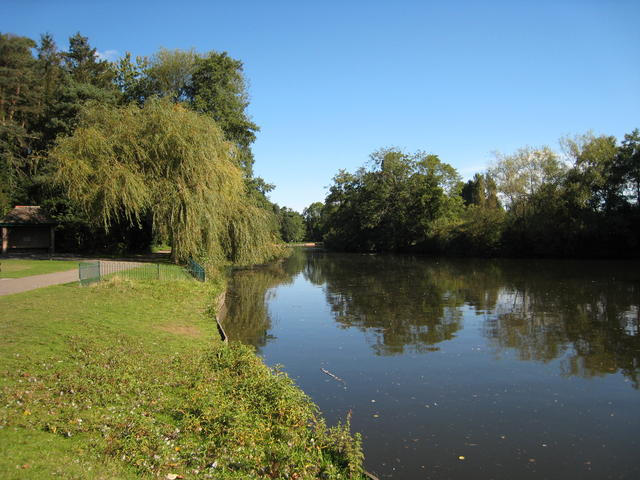
- Brueton Park Lake, formed by the damming of the River Blythe
- Interactive map of Malvern and Brueton Park
- Type: Public park
- Location: Solihull, U.K.
- Coordinates: 52.4082°N 1.7678°W
- Area: 130 acres (0.53 km^{2})
- Created: 1944
- Operator: Solihull Council
- Status: Open year round Green Flag Award

Malvern & Brueton Park shown within the West Midlands

Malvern and Brueton Park is a town park and local nature reserve in Solihull in the West Midlands, England. The park is formed from a comparatively narrow strip of land, with the length being approximately ten times the average width, but it is looped forming a roughly U-shaped layout. The parks cover an area of approximately 130 acres (53 ha). Historically the park was formed by the joining of two separate parcels of different land. There is a large water feature, Brueton Park Lake, which runs through the southern end of the park, and is formed by the damming of a local watercourse, the River Blythe.

The park currently has a Green Flag Award given for its management qualities.

== Description ==
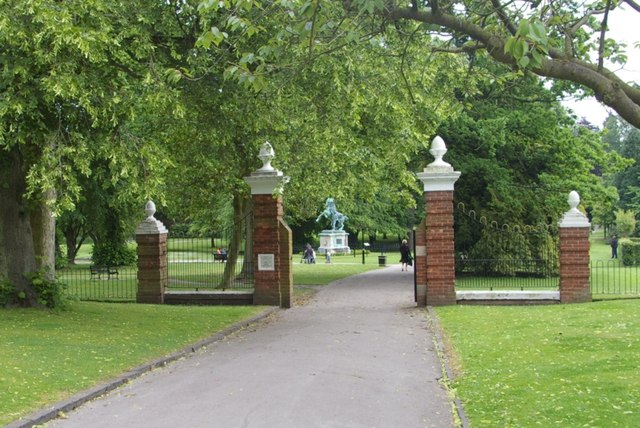
Malvern Park entrance

=== Malvern section ===
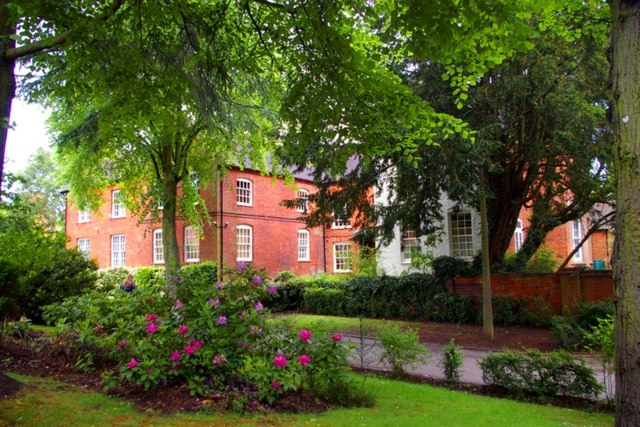
Malvern House at the entrance of the park

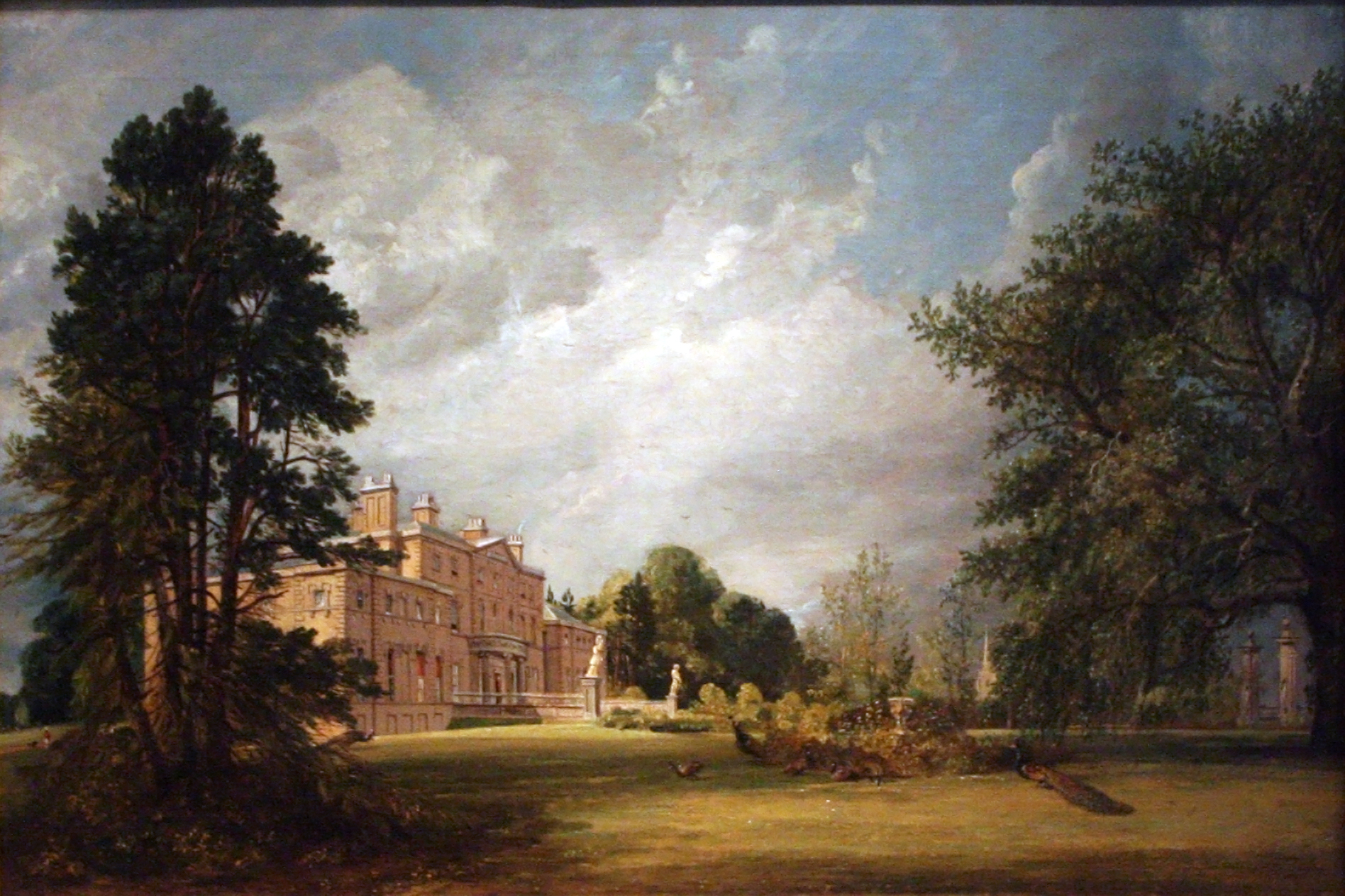
Malvern Hall by John Constable, 1821

Given the size and aspect of the park, the character of the land differs considerably along its length. The Malvern end of the Park acts as a formal town centre Park, and is within easy walking access to the main town shopping area. It also offers displays of formal floral arrangements and has a large children's playground area.

Malvern Park was laid out by the then Urban District Council in 1926 on land partly forming part of the estate of Malvern Hall and partly purchased from local farmers (Malvern Park Farm). Malvern Hall, which dates back to about 1690, still remains but is home now to Solihull Preparatory School. The town centre entrance gateposts date from that year; the gates, like so much municipal ironwork, were requisitioned for scrap during the Second World War and were never replaced.

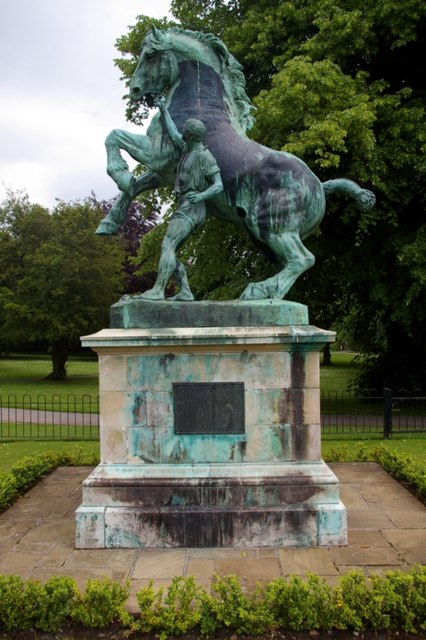
The Horse and His Master statue within Malvern Park, by Sir Joseph Edgar Boehm

A statue, The Horse and His Master dominates the ‘Malvern Park Avenue’. This powerful statue was sculpted in 1874 by Sir Joseph Edgar Boehm (1834–90) is one of his three large important animal works of the early to mid 1870s. This sculpture is a large version with minor alterations of his 1869 "Cart Horse and Groom" that was exhibited at The Royal Academy in 1869. This version was exhibited at the Royal Academy in 1874 and The Paris Exposition in 1878. These two sculptures show that the splendidly rustic groom dressed in corduroys was replaced by a more scantily clad figure strongly reminiscent of Cousteau's leaders of the Marly Horses located on the Champs Elysees, Paris. It was purchased at auction by Captain Oliver Bird, of Bird's Custard, for his garden at Tudor Grange, but he donated it to the Solihull Council in 1945 and it was finally placed in Malvern Park in the Coronation year, 1953.

=== Brueton section ===
In contrast, the Brueton Park side is more devoted to wildlife, with a Local Nature Reserve, the lake and a grove of mature trees. There are several "species" of Oak including English, Turkey, Scarlet and Chestnut-leafed. There is only one species of Ash, but there are several "cultivars" of this species. These include Golden, Single-leafed and weeping Ash. There are also many conifers within the park and these include species such as Scots Pine, Bald Cypress and giant redwood.

The Warwickshire Wildlife Trust opened Parkridge Centre, an environmental education and conservation interpretation centre, in 2002. The Centre offers children's and family programs, workshops, talks and demonstrations as well as providing for the parks toilet and café facilities.

The Park was given to the town by Mr Horace Brueton in 1944, which was formally part of Malvern Hall and the two Parks were linked in 1963.

The conservation area in Brueton Park received Local Nature Reserve status in 2002 in recognition for the Park's importance for wildlife. The Park contains the River Blythe Site of Special Scientific Interest (SSSI) and Woodland, designated in 1989 by English Nature. The woods are important for oak, ash and alder trees as well as a carpet of wildflowers.

== Facilities ==
The park facilities and features include for:

- Car parking
- Play Area
- Tennis courts
- Toilets
- Café
- Flower beds,
- Ornamental gardens,
- Rose garden
- Parkridge Centre - environmental education and conservation programs and activities

The parks became home to Brueton parkrun in July 2010, a free weekly timed 5 km run, walk or jog that starts at 9am on Saturday mornings. Around 500 people of all ages and ability take part every week.

== See also ==
- List of local nature reserves in England
