= Blithe =

Blithe may refer to:

- Albert Blithe (1923–1967), American sergeant in World War II
- John Blithe (MP) (before 1365 – 1410), English politician
- John Blithe (priest) (before 1450 – after 1478), English Archdeacon of Stow and Lindsey 1477–78
- River Blithe, Staffordshire, England
- Saint Blida, also known as Saint Blithe, a Norfolk saint

== See also ==
- Blythe (disambiguation)
- Blyth (disambiguation)
