= Bell baronets of Marlborough Terrace (1895) =

Escutcheon of the Bell baronets of Marlborough Terrace

The Bell baronetcy, of Marlborough Terrace in the Parish of Govan in the county of the city of Glasgow, was created in the Baronetage of the United Kingdom on 29 August 1895 for James Bell, son of the shipowner John Bell, Lord Provost of Glasgow from 1892 to 1896. The title became extinct on the death of the 2nd Baronet in 1943.

== Bell baronets, of Marlborough Terrace (1895) ==
- Sir James Bell, 1st Baronet (1850–1929)
- Sir John Bell, 2nd Baronet (1876–1943), left no heir.

== Notes ==
Baronetage of the United Kingdom
New creation	Baronet (of Lakenheath); 1895–1912	Extinct
Preceded by Dunn baronets	Bell baronets of Marlborough Terrace; 29 August 1895	Succeeded by Blyth baronets
