= The Higgins Art Gallery & Museum =

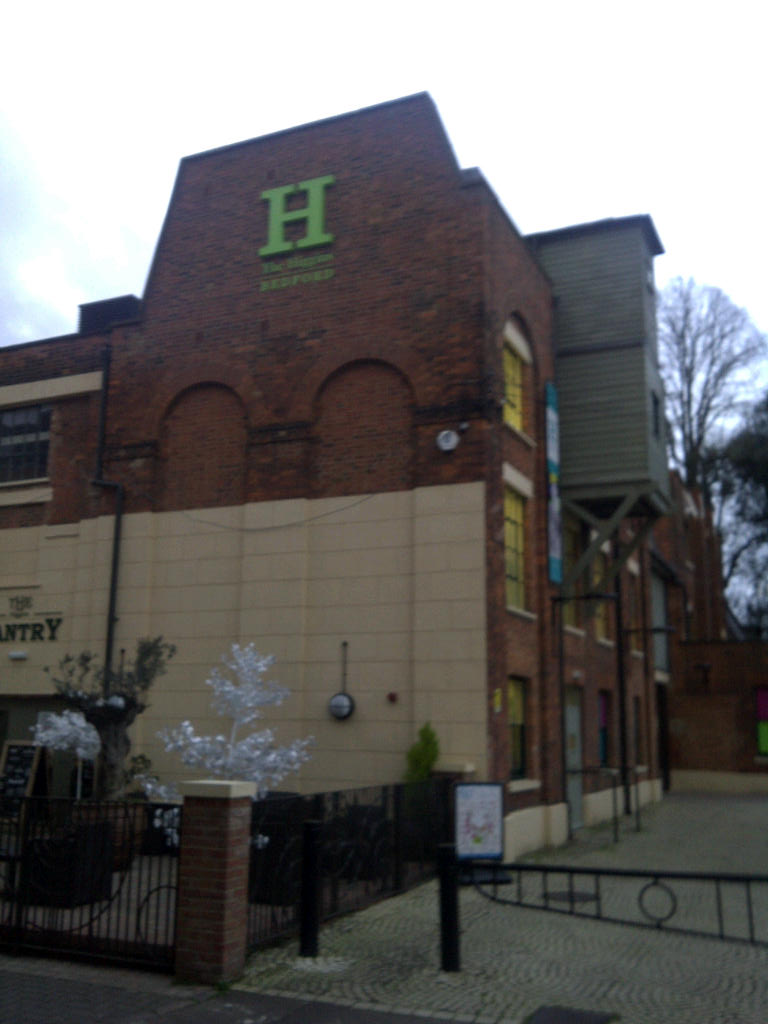
- The Higgins
- Established: 1949 (Cecil Higgins Museum), 1960 (Bedford Museum), 2005 (Cecil Higgins Art Gallery & Museum) 2012 (The Higgins Art Gallery & Museum, Bedford)
- Location: Castle Lane, Bedford, Bedfordshire, England
- Coordinates: 52.1361°N 0.4642°W
- Type: Art Gallery & Museum
- Website: www.thehigginsbedford.org.uk

The Higgins Art Gallery & Museum is the principal art gallery and museum in Bedford, Bedfordshire, England, run by Bedford Borough Council and the trustees of the Cecil Higgins Collection.

== Overview ==
The Higgins Art Gallery & Museum is in the Castle Quarter which occupies the site of Bedford Castle to the east of the High Street on the north side of the River Great Ouse embankment. The quarter also has the Castle Bailey gardens, the Castle Quay development of flats, restaurants and shops, the Castle Mound, and the John Bunyan Museum. The Art Gallery & Museum reopened after an extensive refurbishment in June 2013.

== The Higgins re-branding and development ==
A £5.8m project allowed the buildings to be joined and redeveloped throughout, uniting on one site three previous cultural venues: Cecil Higgins Art Gallery, Bedford Museum and Bedford Gallery. It was felt within the organisation and the council that the new single building needed a new name that encompassed the history of the site and collections, while being more straightforward than the interim merged name. 'The Higgins' was chosen for its connection with the site as the Higgins family home and business, and the prominent role the family played in the town including Charles Higgins (1789–1862) being mayor in 1848.

The redevelopment of the Art Gallery & Museum was a phased process. Phase 1 was completed in April 2009 when Bedford Gallery was reopened. The gallery, a Grade II listed building and part of the Cecil Higgins Art Gallery & Bedford Museum complex, had fallen into disuse in 1973. The reopening of Bedford Gallery as a venue for touring exhibitions, lectures and events gave an insight into what Phase 2 of the re-development process would offer.

Phase 2 of the redevelopment unified three previously separate buildings – Bedford Gallery, Cecil Higgins Art Gallery and Bedford Museum – to create one flagship facility and unite Bedford's unique collections beneath one roof. Building work began in August 2011, and was completed (including refit of the new galleries) in June 2013. This phase was made possible through funding from Bedford Borough Council, the Heritage Lottery Fund, Bedford Charity and several other sources.

The new facility includes space for touring and temporary exhibitions, spaces for learning and activities, a café and shop as well as displays throughout. Among the displays, nationally significant collections of work by the Victorian architect-designer William Burges and the 20th-century designer-printmaker Edward Bawden are housed in dedicated galleries.

== History of the Cecil Higgins Art Gallery ==
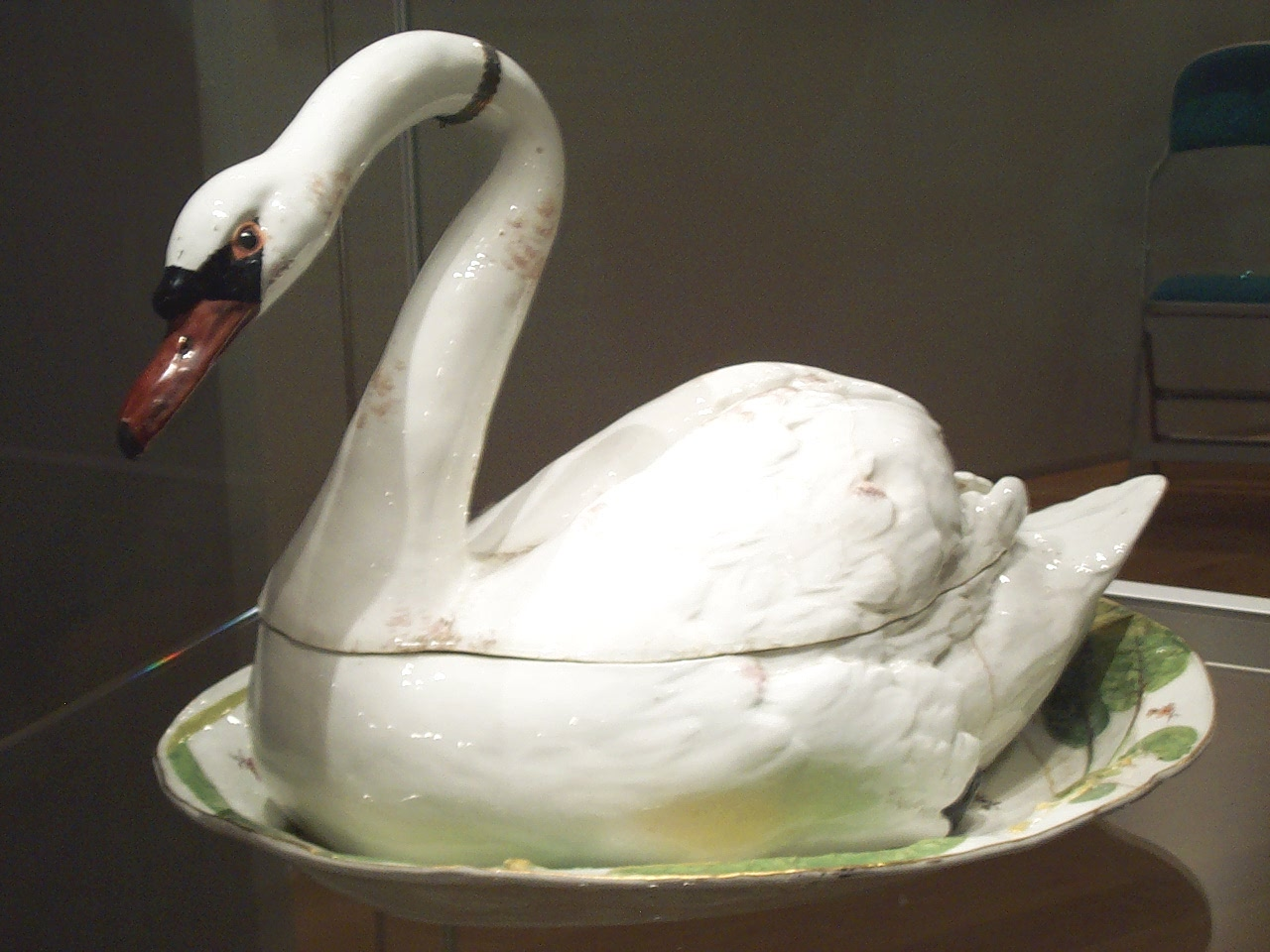
Porcelain Tureen from the Cecil Higgins Gallery collection.

The Higgins Fine & Decorative arts collections were previously an entirely separate institution known as the Cecil Higgins Art Gallery and within the new Gallery & Museum those collections are still owned by the trustees of the Cecil Higgins Art Gallery. The gallery was known for its collections of watercolours, prints, ceramics and furniture as well as two of the largest groupings of works outside London by the art-architect William Burges and the painter Edward Bawden.

The Cecil Higgins Museum, as it was formerly known, opened its doors to the public on 25 July 1949. It was originally occupied the house built in 1846) as the home of Charles Higgins (1789–1862) and his family next to the Higgins & Sons Brewery.

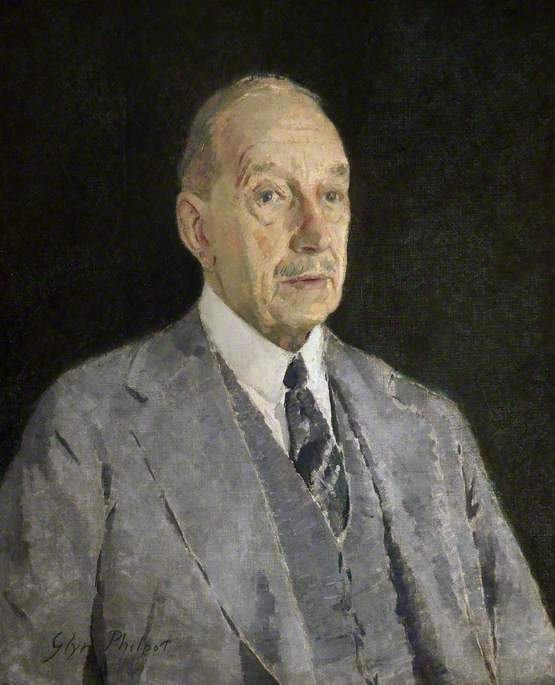
Cecil Higgins (1856–1941); The Higgins Art Gallery & Museum, Bedford, 1935, Glyn Philpot

The museum had been created by the philanthropic brewer, Cecil Higgins (1856–1941) to house his collection of ceramics, glass and objets d’art for the benefit, interest and education of the inhabitants of, and visitors to, Bedford. Higgins realised that public museums were vulnerable, and to protect his collection he left a complex will, which stipulated how the museum was to be organised. He also left a trust fund, to be used for museum purposes, but principally for acquiring works of art (which included Decorative and Applied). While the collection of ceramics and glass was of high quality (each had been selected by James Kiddell of Sotheby's), the collection lacked any notable paintings, save a few 18th-century oils and a small collection of miniatures. The Art Gallery Board made the important decision to collect English watercolours in 1951. By the terms of Cecil Higgins’ will, all acquisitions have to be approved by a ‘recognised artistic authority such as... the Victoria and Albert Museum’ and in 1951, the then-director of the V&A, Sir Leigh Ashton, nominated Graham Reynolds, then Deputy Keeper of the Department of Engraving, Illustration and Design, to approve all watercolours and drawings for acquisition. Graham Reynolds remained an advisor until 1955 when he was succeeded by two authorities in their respective fields who were to shape and expand the collection significantly; Edward Croft-Murray (1907–1980) of the British Museum and Ronald Alley (1926–1999) of the Tate Gallery, from 1957.

The period between 1952 and 1964 were the most productive in terms of collecting watercolours. Over 500 were acquired in twelve years. The Gallery was able to achieve this by the availability of watercolours from private collections in the post-war years and the generosity of Cecil Higgins. Edward Croft-Murray and Ronald Alley each brought their knowledge, vision and taste to the growing collection. Their collecting was divided: Croft-Murray to works made pre-1850 and Alley to post-1850. The Gallery owes a great deal to their dedication and skill, for they were to develop one of the finest post-war collections outside London. That the collection is strong in the greatest painters of every generation is one thing, but that it is also representative of artists who were once popular and influential in their own day and less so at the time of acquisition, is due to their expert scholarship.

In 1971, the collecting policy switched to the decorative arts, with the purchase of a large number of pieces from the Handley-Read Collection. The Cecil Higgins Art Gallery now holds over 200 pieces from the collection of Charles Handley-Read and his wife Lavinia. Charles applied, in 1950, for a post at the Tate, after being rejected he reacted by ‘making a small museum of my own’. They began to form a collection of Victorian work at a time when few scholars and collectors took the period seriously, sometimes tracing the descendants of the architects and designers and buying directly from them. After initially making modest additions to his collection, a number of inheritances in 1964-65 meant that he could accelerate his buying. The 1972 Royal Academy exhibition Victorian and Edwardian Decorative Art, The Handley-Read Collection displayed Charles and Lavinia's entire collection, and acted as their memorial following their suicides in October and December 1971.

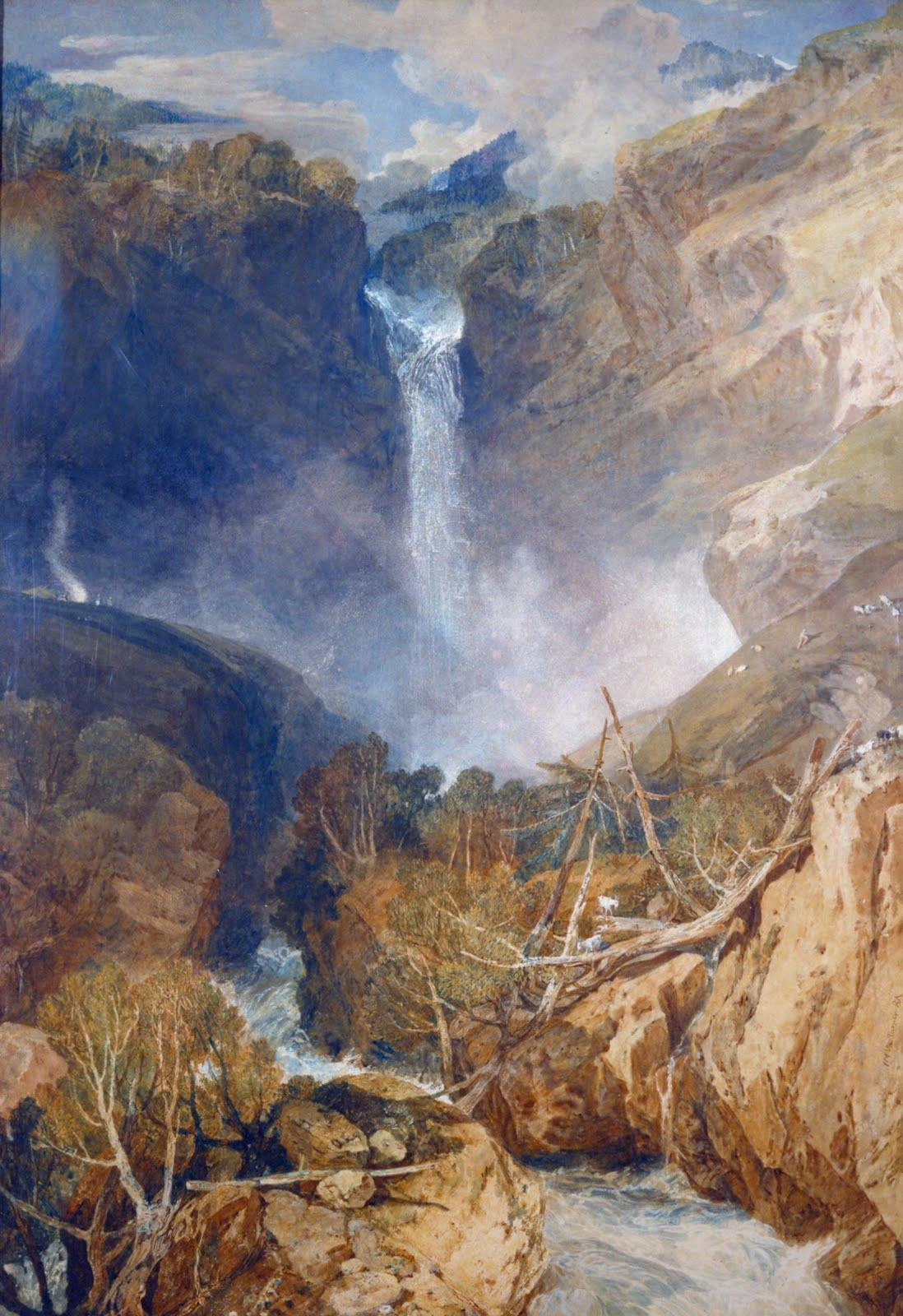
J. M. W. Turner's 1804 watercolour of the Reichenbach Falls, part of the gallery collection.

From 1988, the focus returned to collecting prints, this time concentrating on the 20th century. The print collection now numbers over 400 pieces, including work by some of the finest British artists as well as internationally renowned figures such as Picasso, Lichtenstein and Dürer. The collection charts styles as well as print processes, from Whistler's delicate etchings to Edward Bawden's magnificent linocuts. The last major addition to the print collection was a generous donation in 2004 from the Scottish artist Alan Davie (1920–2014) of over 70 prints, as well as 5 works in gouache.

A significant addition to the collection has been made in recent years by acquiring a number of works by Dora Carrington who attended Bedford High School and lived in Bedford with her family at 1 Rothsay Gardens. Her family were still in Bedford while Carrington attended the Slade School of Art. The collection includes two major oils, 'Mrs Box' and 'Spanish Boy', as well as drawings of her brothers—Noel Carrington and Teddy Carrington—and Bedford Market.

In 2005, the Cecil Higgins Art Gallery merged with Bedford Museum, but retained its separate buildings and identity until it closed for refurbishment in 2007. While work on the Art Gallery did not commence straight away the adjoining Bedford Gallery underwent major refurbishment as Phase 1 of a much larger project, bringing the Grade II listed building back into use as a public space for the first time since the early 1970s. From April 2009 until April 2011 exhibitions of the Cecil Higgins Collections, alongside Bedford Museum collections and loaned exhibits, were held in Bedford Gallery. Following Phase 2 of the redevelopment project, Bedford Gallery was absorbed into the larger Gallery and Museum building, and accessed via the main entrance in the courtyard of the former brewery building.

== History of Bedford Museum ==
Bedford Museum was formed in the 1960s from the collections of Bedford Modern School and Bedford Borough Council. Its social history, archaeology, natural history and ethnography collections tell the stories of the people and places that have shaped Bedford and its relationship with the wider world, from prehistory to the present day.

In 1884, a solicitor called Charles Prichard, donated his private collection of fossils and minerals to Bedford Modern School, where he had formerly been a pupil. In addition he provided funds for the creation of a school museum to house the collections with an annual grant of £10 for its upkeep. Although additions were made to the original collections, oddities from all over the world began to feature as fathers and Old Boys travelled and took up positions in foreign lands. As a result, the museum became somewhat disrespectfully known as the ‘Old Curiosity Shop’.

The 1920s saw sweeping changes with the appointment of P.G. Langdon as Honorary Curator. Langdon's aim was to reorganise the collections and establish them as a nucleus of a county museum. He acquired archaeological material including Roman and Saxon pottery and jewellery from Kempston, replaced the worst of the natural history with the J. Steele Elliot collection of Bedfordshire birds, mammals, nests and eggs and, in 1929, developed two new refurbished galleries. For the first time the displays were opened to the public on Wednesday and Saturday afternoons, for an admission price of 6d. With this new high-profile status the museum became recognised as one of the best school museums in England.

The next major figure to influence the museum's future was F.W. Kuhlicke, a local historian and heraldry specialist who was appointed Honorary Curator in 1933. He continued to develop the collections but by the 1950s the school needed more space for the expanding numbers and discussions took place with the Borough of Bedford to see whether the Borough could take on the public museum role. The opportunity arose to combine the school museum with the smaller collections held by the Borough of Bedford and in 1962 the newly established town museum opened in a former garage and showroom on the Embankment, with Kuhlicke as the first Honorary Curator.

This, however, was only a temporary arrangement while more substantial premises were sought. In the 1970s the former Higgins and Sons Castle Brewery buildings became available. Built in 1838, this red brick industrial building offered greater potential for public service, temporary exhibitions and storage for the ever increasing collections of north Bedfordshire. The first professional Curator, John Turner, was appointed in 1974 and he led the extensive refurbishment and transformation of the brewery buildings into the new town museum, which opened its doors to the public in 1981. The museum was merged with the Cecil Higgins Art Gallery in 2005, but still retained its separate buildings and identity until it closed to the public for refurbishment in October 2010. In June 2013 the museum reopened as part of the new combined complex.

The museum's collections of around 20,000 items depict the human, social and natural history of the Borough of Bedford. These include domestic, corporate, military and agricultural artefacts, as well as local crafts and industries.

Bedford Museum's archaeology collections include Palaeolithic flint tools and hand axes, as well as later artefacts from the Medieval times. The museum also has an extensive numismatics collection. The geology collections feature ammonite coiled shells and giant marine reptiles of the Jurassic period. Local birds, mammals, insects and plants are found in the museum's natural history collections.

== History of the site ==
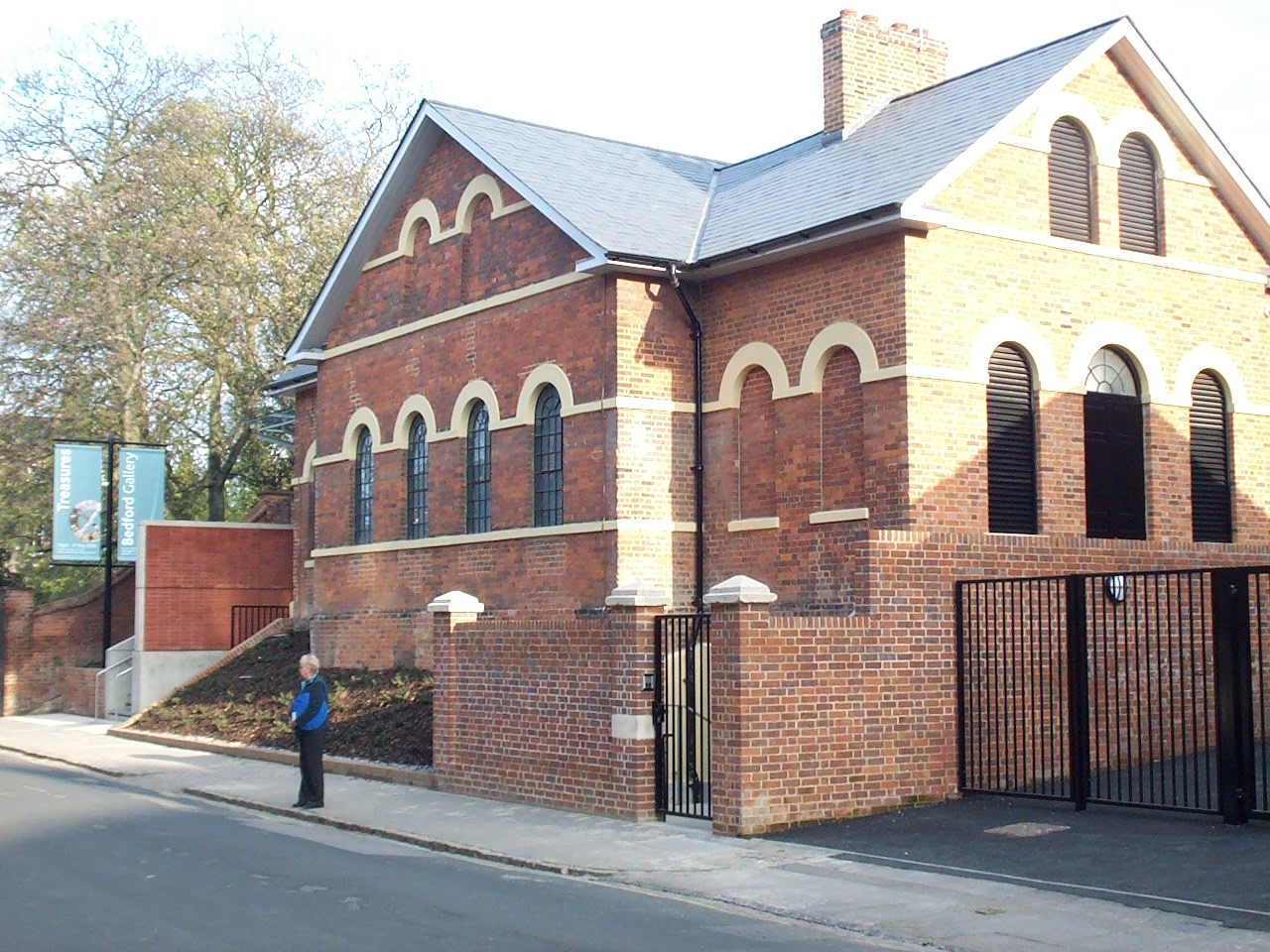
Bedford Gallery

The site and its buildings have a long history with many different uses, not least of all the Siege of Bedford Castle, which is described on the wiki entry for the Castle.

The history of the present buildings begins in 1804 with the building of a Hexagonal Militia Depot on a former Castle earthwork. The depot was later used for many other purposes including St. Agnes Elementary School and as kitchens for Castle Close, the Higgins family home. Since 1949 it has been used as a gallery space, an office, and an educational activities space. Since the 2008 Phase 1 redevelopment of the site it has been refurbished as a gallery space and will house the William Burges collection on the Art Gallery & Museum's reopening.

In 1837, Charles Higgins (1789–1862) bought the lease for Castle Lane from the Duke of Bedford. He started by building the brewery which was completed in 1838.

Between 1840 and 1841 the building we now call Bedford Gallery was constructed, facing north on Castle Lane, opposite the Bunyan Meeting Church. Bedford Gallery was originally designed to be used as a clubhouse known as ‘Castle Rooms’, for supporters and members of the Whig party. Rate books from the time show that it was divided into 3 sections: a house, club rooms and a cellar. From 1848, the building was used by the Bunyan Meeting as a Sunday School, for Church gatherings and for teas. This lasted until the 1880s; listings show that it was then used by the Plymouth Brethren, a non-denominational Christian movement. In the early part of the 20th century it became a billiard hall. For some time during World War Two, the British Broadcasting Corporation music department is believed to have used Bedford Gallery as a rehearsal and recording studio. In August 1941 the BBC had evacuated several departments from London to Bedford; other local buildings used included the Corn Exchange, St. Paul's Church, the Co-Partners hall in the Queens Park area of the town, and the Great Hall of Bedford School.

After the war, the building returned to use as a billiard hall and table tennis saloon. In 1960, it was given over to the Cecil Higgins Art Gallery and renamed Bedford Gallery; from then until 1973 it was a venue for exhibitions and events.

After being closed for over 30 years, Bedford Gallery was earmarked for a £2.5m refurbishment. The project, funded by Government and Bedford Borough Council, created a state-of-the-art venue that housed a programme of temporary exhibitions (including 'High Art, Low life—Toulouse-Lautrec', a touring show from the British Museum) during the closure of the Cecil Higgins Art Gallery from April 2009 until April 2011. In 2013 it reopened as part of the new combined Art Gallery & Museum.

The lease required Higgins to build a house on the site; Castle Close, the house Charles built for himself and his family, was built in 1846 and occupied by members of the family until the early 1920s. By the end of the 1920s the property was in the possession of the Bedford Corporation (later Bedford Borough Council) and used for administrative purposes until the Will of Cecil Higgins proposed the housing of his collection there in 1941. The conditions were accepted and the museum opened in 1949.

== See also ==
- John Bunyan Museum – museum dedicated to John Bunyan, just north of the Art Gallery & Museum, within the Cultural Quarter.
