= Malvern Hall (painting) =

Painting by John Constable

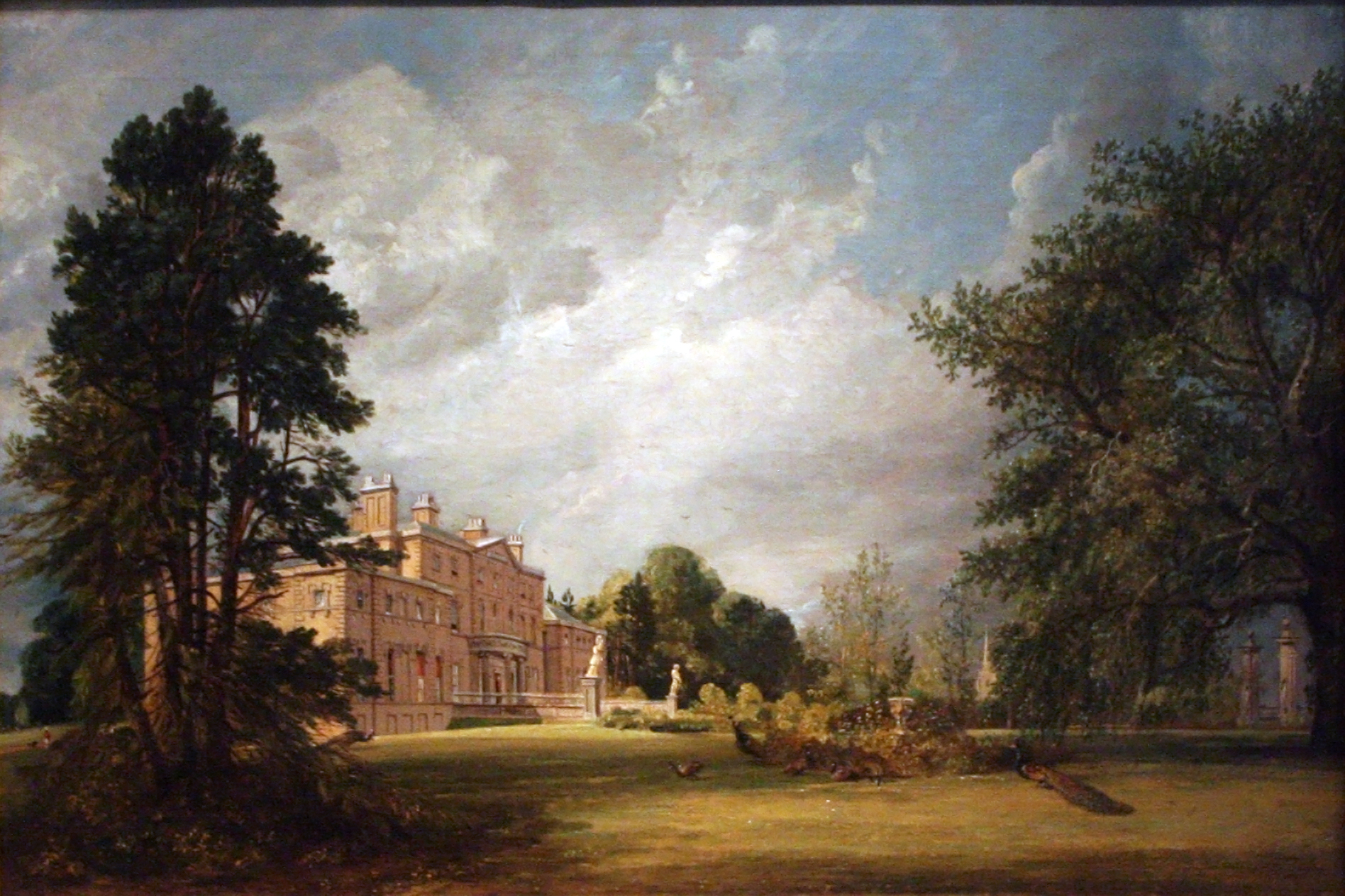
- Artist: John Constable
- Year: 1821
- Type: Oil on canvas, Landscape painting
- Dimensions: 53 cm × 78 cm (21 in × 30.7 in)
- Location: Clark Art Institute, Williamstown, Massachusetts

Malvern Hall is an 1821 landscape painting by the British artist John Constable. It depicts a view of Malvern Hall in Solihull. It is now Solihull Prep School. Constable, known in particular for his paintings of his native Suffolk, first visited Malvern Hall in 1809 and returned again in 1820. He was invited by Magdelane, the widow of Lionel Tollemache, 5th Earl of Dysart. As the house had been rebuilt and restored since his previous visit, he was encouraged by her to paint it again.

The original is now in the Clark Art Institute in Williamstown, Massachusetts. A second version was displayed at the Royal Academy's Summer Exhibition in 1822 and has been in the collection of the Musée de Tessé in Le Mans since 1863. A full-sized preliminary sketch, likely painted outdoors, is now in the Yale Center for British Art.

== See also ==
- List of paintings by John Constable

== Bibliography ==
- Charles, Victoria. Constable. Parkstone International, 2015.
- Hamilton, James. Constable: A Portrait. Hachette UK, 2022.
- Reynolds, Graham. Constable's England. Metropolitan Museum of Art, 1983.
- Venning, Barry. Constable. Parkstone International, 2015.
