= William Blythe =

William (Bill, Billy) Blyth(e) may refer to:

- W. J. Blythe Jr. (born 1935), known as Bill, former member of the Texas House of Representatives
- William Jefferson Blythe Jr. (1918–1946), biological father of Bill Clinton
- Bill Clinton (born William Jefferson Blythe III in 1946), 42nd President of the United States
- Billy Blyth (1895–1968), Scottish footballer

== See also ==
- Blythe (surname)
