= Baron Blyth =

Barony in the Peerage of the United Kingdom

Escutcheon of the Barons Blyth

Baron Blyth (/ˈblaɪ/ BLY), of Blythwood in the Parish of Stansted Mountfichet in the County of Essex, is a title in the Peerage of the United Kingdom. It was created in 1907 for Sir James Blyth, 1st Baronet. He was a Director of the gin-making firm of W. & A. Gilbey as well as an expert on wine culture and wine commerce. Before his elevation to the peerage, Blyth had been created a Baronet, of Blythwood in the Parish of Stansted Mountfitchet in the County of Essex, on 30 August 1895. His eldest son, the second Baron, was a Director of W. and A. Gilbey. The latter was succeeded by his nephew, the third Baron. He was the son of Audley James Blyth, second son of the first Baron.

As of 2026 the titles are held by the third Baron's grandson, the fifth Baron, who succeeded his father in 2009.

== Barons Blyth (1907) ==
- James Blyth, 1st Baron Blyth (1841–1925)
- Herbert William Blyth, 2nd Baron Blyth (1868–1943)
- Ian Audley James Blyth, 3rd Baron Blyth (1905–1977)
- Anthony Audley Rupert Blyth, 4th Baron Blyth (1931–2009)
- James Audley Ian Blyth, 5th Baron Blyth (b. 1970)

The heir apparent is the present holder's son Hugo Audley Jasper Blyth (b. 2006).

== Sources ==
- Hesilrige, Arthur G. M. (1921). Debrett's Peerage and Titles of courtesy. London: London: Dean & son, limited. p. 122.
- Kidd, Charles, Williamson, David (editors). Debrett's Peerage and Baronetage (1990 edition). New York: St Martin's Press, 1990.

Baronetage of the United Kingdom
Preceded by Bell baronets	Blyth baronets of Blythwood; 30 August 1895	Succeeded by Naylor-Leyland baronets
