= River Blythe =

River in Warwickshire and the West Midlands, England

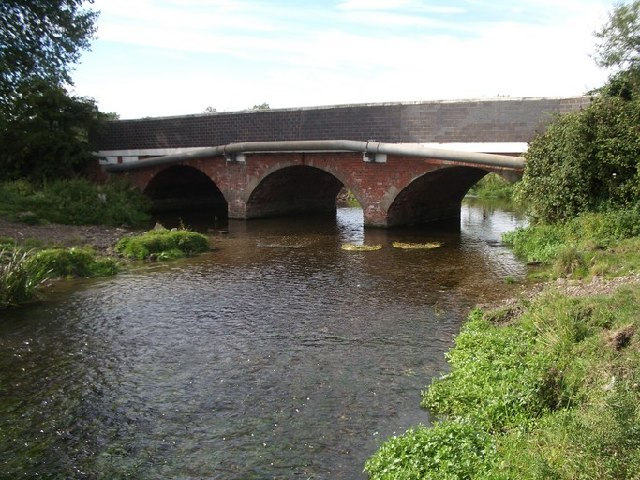
- The river near Hampton-in-Arden

Location
- Country: England

Physical characteristics
- Source
  - location: Earlswood Lakes, Warwickshire
  - coordinates: 52°21′58″N 1°50′00″W
- Mouth
  - location: Confluence with the Tame at Ladywalk
  - coordinates: 52°28′0″N 1°40′45″W
- Length: 16 miles (26.72 km)

Basin features
- Progression: Tame—Trent—Humber—North Sea

The River Blythe flows through the English Midlands from central Warwickshire, through the Borough of Solihull and on to Coleshill in north Warwickshire. It runs along the Meriden Gap in the Midlands Plateau, is fed by the River Cole and is a tributary of the River Tame beside the West Midland Bird Club's Ladywalk reserve. This then joins the River Trent, whose waters reach the North Sea via the Humber Estuary.

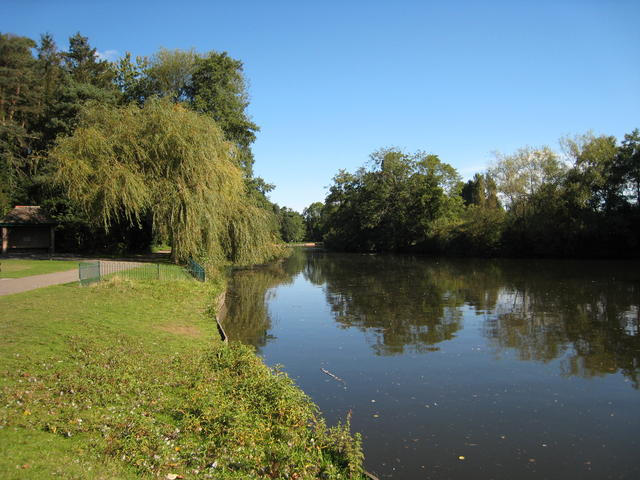
Brueton Park Lake, formed by the damming of the River Blythe at Solihull

The river rises at various sources near Earlswood Lakes, but the principal tributary is listed as Spring Brook (52.350915°N 1.843601°W; grid reference SP107725). From here it winds north east, skirting Cheswick Green, towards Solihull. Here it passes through a local wildlife park, Malvern and Brueton Park and Nature Reserve, where it briefly splits/outpours for approximately 250 metres to form Brueton Park Lake. From here it meanders east, past several old country houses—Old Berry Hall, Ravenshaw Hall and Eastcote Hall—before turning sharply south towards Barston, which is encircled within a large meander of the river. At Temple Balsall the Cuttle Brook feeds the river, which now arcs north, and again close by Barston. Past Hampton in Arden the river is fed by Shadow Brook, at Diddington Hall. Travelling further north it passes to the east of Coleshill, and is fed by the River Cole, only a few hundred yards before it itself feeds into the River Tame (52.522317°N 1.688242°W; grid reference SP212916), at Ladywalk Nature Reserve.

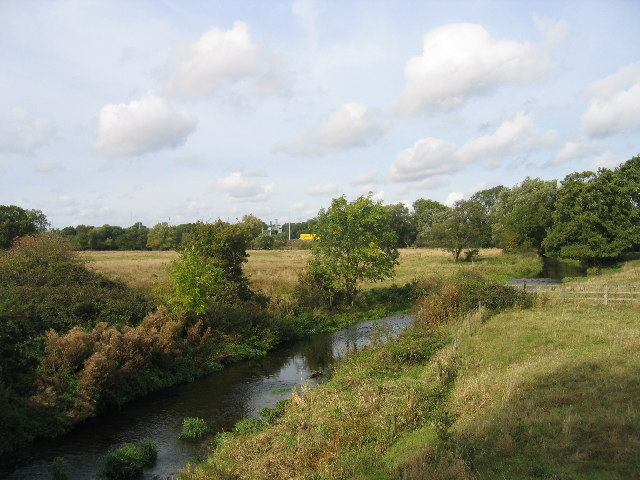
Blythe Valley, looking north along the River Blythe near Eastcote

The river is "a particularly fine example of a lowland river on clay" according to its Sites of Special Scientific Interest citation. The SSSI was notified in 1989, and includes a 24-mile (39 km) stretch of the river from near its source to the point it joins the River Tame. The Blythe has a wide range of natural geographical features such as riffles, pools, small cliffs and meanders, combined with a high diversity of substrate types ranging from fine silt and clay in the lower reaches to sands and gravels in the upper and middle reaches. The structure of this river is very variable and diverse, and is important as a rare example of such in lowland Britain.

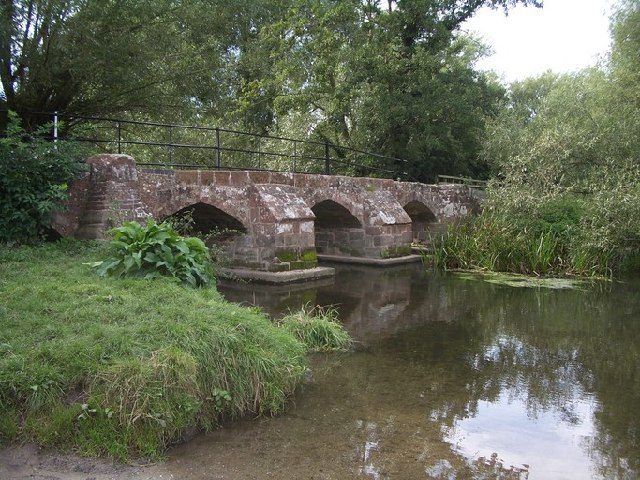
The old Packhorse Bridge, south of Hampton-in-Arden, crossing the River Blythe

The diverse physical features of the Blythe are matched by its diverse plant communities. Botanically, the Blythe is one of the richest rivers in lowland England, with the most species-rich sections containing as many species as the very richest chalk streams. In addition, several damp, unimproved meadows occur along the length of the river; they receive some of their water from annual flooding and are largely dependent upon the river for the maintenance of a high water-table. As well as the rich and diverse flora, the river supports a diverse invertebrate community with a wide range of molluscs, oligochaetes and caddisflies.

However, physical modification to the watercourse and the riparian zone has impacted the functionality of the River Blythe, resulting in the SSSI's condition labelled as "unfavourable no change" in 2017. The factors leading to this were mainly due to historic management; many sections of the river have been straightened, and the riparian zone modified and disrupted, upsetting the site's ecological health and lowering the overall SSSI status.

The river is popular with anglers along much of its length, although in dry weather it can become shallow in places. Species to be found include perch, chub and dace with occasional summer carp being caught. The river also holds tench, bream and rudd and more recently a small number of barbel have been caught.

== Crossings ==
- Fishery Lane (leads to Ladywalk Reserve)
- Birmingham–Peterborough line (near Coleshill Parkway railway station)
- Blyth Hall packhorse bridge (grade II listed)
- Blythe Mill (grade II listed)
- Blythe Bridge, Coleshill (grade II listed)
- Duke End Bridge (grade II listed)
- M6 Toll
- M6 Motorway (junction 3A)
- A45 Birmingham Road
- A452 Kenilworth Road
- Blythe Viaduct (Birminingham Loop railway line)
- Hampton in Arden packhorse bridge (grade II* listed and scheduled monument)
- Barston Ford
- M42 motorway
- Henwood Mill
- Ford Bridge
- Grand Union Canal
- A41 Solihull Bypass
- Birmingham to Worcester via Kidderminster line
- M42 motorway
- M42 motorway
- A34 road
- Stratford-upon-Avon Canal

== See also ==
- River Blyth
- River Blithe
- Rivers of the United Kingdom
