= John Dean Blythe =

John Dean Blythe (1842–1869), was an English writer.

== Biography ==
He was born at Ashton-under-Lyne on 12 April 1842, the son of Peter Dean Blythe and his wife Elizabeth. His grandfather, James Blythe, was a notable Scotch schoolmaster at the village of Limekilns, about fifteen miles from Edinburgh. After a brief stay at the Ryecroft British school, Blythe worked in a factory; then obtained a post on a local paper as reporter, and afterwards entered a firm in Manchester, in whose employment he remained until his death. He attended night classes and studied by himself. He learned Latin, French, and Spanish, and read English literature. A retentive memory enabled him to recall an immense number of passages, especially from Shakespeare. On one occasion, Blythe supplied the references to fifty-seven out of sixty passages selected to try him. Amongst his manuscripts was one containing over five hundred entries, alphabetically arranged, of the contents of "A Midsummer Night's Dream". In politics he was a philosophical radical. He attended, as a teacher, the Sunday school of the Methodist New Connexion, in Stamford Street, Manchester, during the greater portion of his life. On 5th Feb. 1869, he was killed by the accidental discharge of a revolver in the hands of a friend.

== Literary work ==
Blythe's literary efforts were encouraged by the Rev. Joseph Rayner Stephens and John Critchley Prince. A contribution to Punch and some verses in the Ashton newspapers are the only pieces known to have been printed during Blythe's lifetime. He edited a manuscript magazine which circulated amongst the members of a self-improvement society. He left behind him a considerable amount of manuscript, and a small memorial volume was issued, entitled A Sketch of the Life (by Joseph Williamson) and a Selection from the Writings of John Dean Blythe, Manchester, 1870.
