= Blythe River =

Coordinates: 42°56′S 173°16′E

Location
- Country: New Zealand

Physical characteristics
- Mouth
  - location: Pacific Ocean

The Blythe River is a river in Canterbury, New Zealand. It flows east for 13 kilometres (8 mi), reaching the Pacific Ocean 12 kilometres (7 mi) south of the town of Cheviot. The river's course roughly parallels that of the larger Hurunui River, which lies 5 kilometres (3 mi) to the north.

== See also ==
- List of rivers of New Zealand
