= The Blyth Academy =

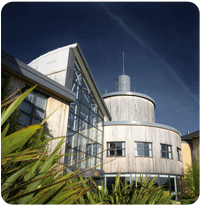

Location
- Chase Farm Drive; Blyth, Northumberland, Northumberland, NE24 4JP; England; 55°07′25″N 1°32′52″W

Information
- Type: Academy
- Motto: Outcomes Focused, Child Centred
- Religious affiliation: None
- Established: 1 September 2000
- Department for Education URN: 140002 Tables
- Ofsted: Reports
- President: Rob Tarn
- Principal: Jodie Urwin
- Gender: Mixed
- Age: 11 to 16
- Colours: Yellow, Black
- Website: tba.northerneducationtrust.org

The Blyth Academy is a mixed secondary school and located in Blyth, Northumberland, England. It was opened as Blyth Community College in 2000 following the amalgamation of Tynedale High School and Ridley High School. The school was built for 1450 students and has an estimated figure of around 1000 students, and is made up of years 7 through to 11; with two sixth form years. In 2008, the college changed its name to The Blyth School, Community College.

The school offers a range of subject choices, from history to childcare, to languages to electronics. The school has shown improved results in recent years, and was higher than some other schools in the Northumberland GCSE results league table for 2011 and 2012. It is expected to continue to improve as an academy.
