= Alan Blyth (artist) =

English painter

Alan Blyth (fl. 1921 – 1953) was an English artist who primarily painted landscape and botanical paintings, predominantly in the oil medium.

== Life and work ==
Alan Blyth was born 14 August 1889 in Nowshera Bengal, India, the son of Frederick Augustus Blyth (Colonel Indian Army) and Margaret (nee Tulloch). He studied at the Royal Academy of Arts between 23 January 1923 and January 1928. He married Elsie North Anderson (b. 1891) on 6 July 1930. He died on 4 February 1956 at Pine Tree Cottage, Exeter Road, Ottery St Mary, Devon.

He exhibited at the majority of London galleries including the New English Art Club, the Royal Academy, Royal Society of Portrait Painters, Royal Institute of Painters in Water Colours, Royal Institute of Oil Painters, and Walker's Gallery.

The label of the Royal Society of Portrait Painters on his portrait in oils entitled 'Vera' gives his address at the time as 'Jacques', Garboldisham, Diss, Norfolk. During the 1990s, work by Blyth appeared in auctions at Bonham's and Christie's. However, for such a widely exhibited artist, it is unusual that little other biographical information is known.

== Exhibitions ==
(Solo)

- An exhibition of water-colour drawings: October 31 to November 12, 1927 / by Alan Blyth - Walker's Gallery, London

(Group)

Pictures exhibited at the Royal Academy, London

- 1925 - The Black Mountains, Brecon
- 1932 - Rough Water
- 1935 - Autumn Bunch,
- 1935 - Cineraria
- 1936 - Winter Morning
- 1937 - A Suffolk Road
- 1938 - Coronation fantasy
- 1940 - Evening at an R.A.F. Aerodrome
- 1940 - Building an R.A.F. Aerodrome
- 1945 - The Roads of France
- 1945 - The Aftermath
- 1947 - Blakeney
- 1948 - Quinces
- 1949 - Trees at Preston, Suffolk
- 1951 - The Begonia
- 1953 - Still life
