= John Bunyan Museum =

Coordinates: 52.13662°N 0.46356°W

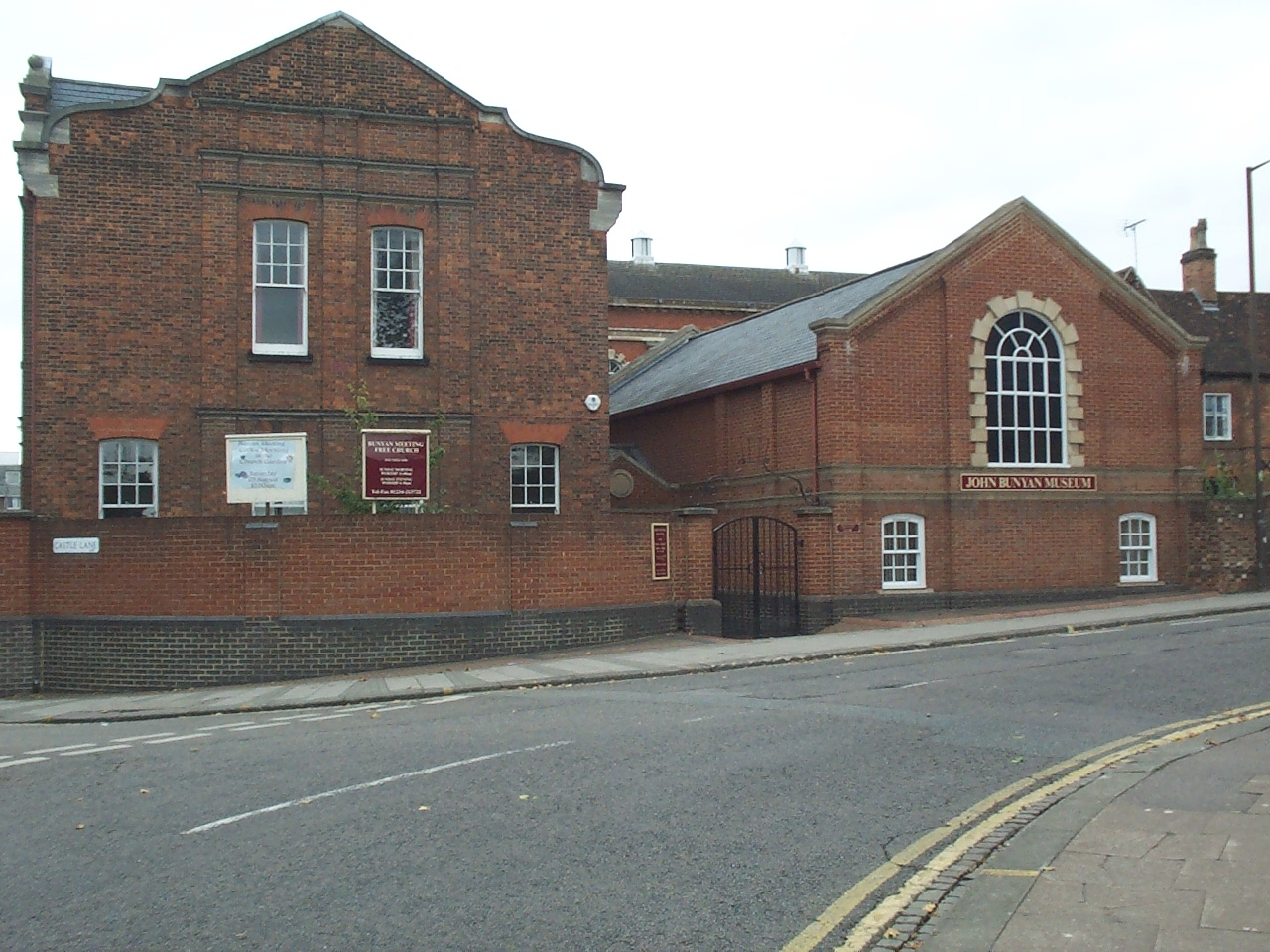
- Established: 1998
- Location: Mill Street, Bedford, Bedfordshire, England, United Kingdom
- Type: Biographical museum
- Website: John Bunyan Museum & Library

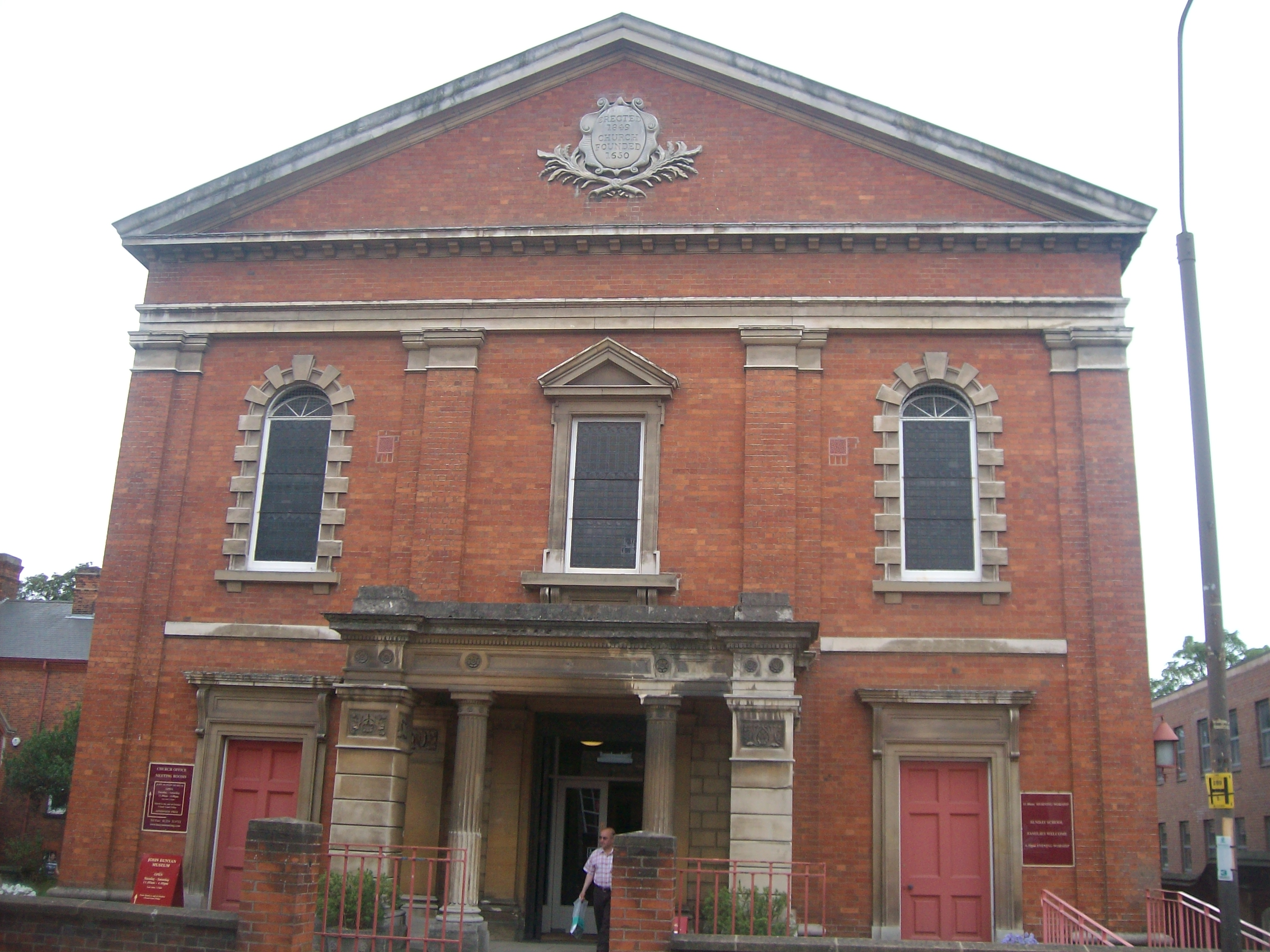
Bunyan Meeting Free Church

John Bunyan Museum is a museum primarily dedicated to the life, times and works of John Bunyan. The museum is located in Bedford, Bedfordshire, England.

John Bunyan (1628 – 1688), a Christian writer and preacher, was born in Harrowden (one mile south-east of Bedford), in the Parish of Elstow, England. He wrote The Pilgrim's Progress, arguably the most famous published Christian allegory. In the Church of England he is remembered with a Lesser Festival on 30 August.

In 1672, the congregation led by Bunyan purchased a barn which they used to conduct worship. Eventually, a church, which came to be called the Bunyan Meeting Free Church, was built on the site of the barn. In 1849, a second church was built which is still used for services. A separate museum building was constructed in the compound in 1998 and the Bunyan artefacts and memorabilia formerly housed in a small museum room in the church were moved into it.

The museum's displays recreate a number of scenes from Bunyan's life which also show some of Bedford's social history in the seventeenth century. In addition there are artefacts such as Bunyan's iron violin and wooden flute, Bunyan's stoneware jug he used in prison as well as his will and a third edition of The Pilgrim's Progress.

== See also ==
- The Higgins Art Gallery & Museum - Bedford's principal museum and art gallery complex, situated opposite the John Bunyan collection
- Elstow Moot Hall - a medieval market house on Elstow village green, housing a small museum dedicated to seventeenth century life, and the life and works of John Bunyan
- Harlington Manor -The house in which John Bunyan was interrogated and briefly imprisoned in 1660. It is thought to be the only building still standing in which John Bunyan is known to have stayed
