= Blythe (surname) =

Blythe is an English surname.

== Geographical distribution ==
As of 2014, 58.1% of all known bearers of the surname Blythe were residents of the United States (frequency 1:32,907), 24.0% of England (1:12,271), 6.1% of Australia (1:20,745), 3.3% of Canada (1:58,971), 2.4% of Jamaica (1:6,454), 1.3% of Scotland (1:21,333) and 1.1% of New Zealand (1:22,751).

In England, the frequency of the surname was higher than average (1:12,271) in the following counties:

1. Cumbria (1:4,362)
2. Tyne and Wear (1:4,908)
3. Cheshire (1:5,072)
4. Northumberland (1:5,876)
5. North Yorkshire (1:6,261)
6. County Durham (1:6,465)
7. Lincolnshire (1:6,820)
8. Nottinghamshire (1:7,757)
9. Norfolk (1:8,388)
10. East Riding of Yorkshire (1:8,392)
11. South Yorkshire (1:8,427)
12. Kent (1:8,515)
13. Rutland (1:9,486)
14. West Yorkshire (1:9,976)
15. Merseyside (1:10,365)
16. Gloucestershire (1:10,496)
17. Cambridgeshire (1:10,878)
18. East Sussex (1:11,379)
19. Leicestershire (1:11,489)
20. Warwickshire (1:11,826)
21. Hertfordshire (1:11,831)

In the United States, the frequency of the surname was higher than average (1:32,907) in the following states:

1. Kentucky (1:8,270)
2. North Carolina (1:11,002)
3. Delaware (1:14,597)
4. Iowa (1:15,010)
5. Indiana (1:16,313)
6. Alabama (1:17,446)
7. Virginia (1:18,318)
8. Arkansas (1:19,473)
9. Kansas (1:20,879)
10. Mississippi (1:21,264)
11. Oregon (1:21,994)
12. Montana (1:22,653)
13. Ohio (1:23,491)
14. Oklahoma (1:24,570)
15. Tennessee (1:24,973)
16. Nebraska (1:25,468)
17. Georgia (1:27,862)
18. Texas (1:29,336)
19. New Mexico (1:30,514)
20. Illinois (1:31,751)

== People ==
- Adam Blythe (born 1989), British road cyclist
- Arthur Blythe (1940–2017), American jazz alto saxophonist and composer
- Benedict Blythe (2016–2021), British child, namesake of Benedict's Law
- Betty Blythe (1893–1972), American actress
- Bill Clinton (William Blythe, born 1946), 42nd American president
- Colin Blythe (1879–1917), English cricketer
- Daniel Blythe (born 1969), British author
- Domini Blythe (1947–2010), British-born Canadian actress
- Ernest Blythe (1889–1975), Irish politician
- Geoffrey Blythe (died c. 1530), Bishop of Lichfield and Coventry
- Geoffrey Blythe (divine) (died 1542), English clergyman
- Janus Blythe (born 1951), American actress
- Jimmy Blythe (1901–1931), American jazz and boogie woogie pianist
- John Blythe (disambiguation), several people
- Mabel Blythe (1930–2004), Sri Lankan actress and singer
- Matty Blythe, English rugby league player
- Nils Blythe (born 1956), British journalist and Director of Communications at the Bank of England
- Peter Blythe (1934–2004), British character actor
- Randy Blythe (born 1971), vocalist of American heavy metal band Lamb of God and side-project band Halo of Locusts
- Robert Blythe (actor), Welsh actor
- Ronald Blythe (1922–2023), British writer and editor
- Samuel George Blythe (1868–1947), American writer and newspaperman
- Stephanie Blythe (born 1970), American mezzo-soprano opera singer
- Thomas Henry Blythe (1822–1883), American entrepreneur, pioneer of irrigation in the Colorado River valley. Blythe, California is named after him.
- Wilfred Lawson Blythe (1896–1975), British colonial administrator.
- William Blythe (disambiguation), multiple people with the name

Fictional characters:

- Gilbert Blythe, fictional character in Lucy Maud Montgomery's Anne of Green Gables novel series

== See also ==
- Blythe (disambiguation)
- Blyth (surname)
- Albert Blithe (1923–1967), career soldier in the United States Army
