= Jim Blyth (footballer, born 1911) =

Scottish footballer

Personal information
- Full name: James Barnes Blyth
- Date of birth: 9 August 1911
- Place of birth: Gorebridge, Scotland
- Date of death: 1979 (aged 68)
- Place of death: Gorebridge, Scotland
- Height: 5 ft 10 1/2 in (1.79 m)
- Position: Centre half

Youth career
- –: Newtongrange
- –: Arniston Rangers

Senior career*
Years	Team	Apps	(Gls)
1936–1937	Tottenham Hotspur	11	(0)
1937–1939	Hull City	72	(0)
1939–1946	Heart of Midlothian	0	(0)
–	→ Falkirk (loan)		
1946–1952	St Johnstone	132	(1)
1952–1956	Forfar Athletic	92	(1)
–	Peebles Rovers		
Total		307	(2)
- * Club domestic league appearances and goals

James Barnes Blyth (9 August 1911 – 1979) was a Scottish professional footballer who played for Newtongrange, Arniston Rangers, Tottenham Hotspur, Hull City, Heart of Midlothian, Falkirk and St Johnstone.

== Football career ==
After spells with junior clubs Newtongrange and Armiston Rangers, Blyth joined Tottenham Hotspur in 1936. The centre half featured in 11 matches in his time at White Hart Lane. He moved on to Hull City in 1937 to play in a further 72 matches before having spells at Heart of Midlothian, Falkirk (loan), St Johnstone and Forfar Athletic.
