= River Blithe =

River in Staffordshire, England

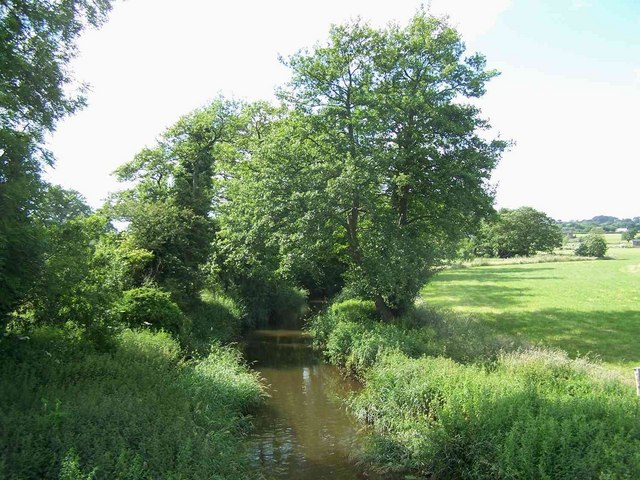
- Blithe near to The Blythe

- Confluence with the River Trent shown in Staffordshire

Location
- Country: England
- Counties: Staffordshire

Physical characteristics
- Source
  - location: Heywood Grange Farm, Staffordshire
- Mouth
  - location: King's Bromley, Staffordshire
  - coordinates: 52.75580°N 1.83163°W
- Length: 29 km (18 mi)
- Basin size: 167 km^{2} (64 sq mi)
- Discharge
  - location: Hamstall Ridware
  - average: 1.16 m^{3}/s (41 cu ft/s)

Basin features
- Tributaries
  - left: Tad Brook, Ash Brook, Pur Brook
  - right: Bear's Brook, Stoney Brook

The River Blithe is a river in Staffordshire, England. It is a tributary of the River Trent and runs for around 18 miles from source to its confluence with the River Trent.

== Etymology ==
The Origins of the name Blithe probably come from the Old English for gentle, cheerful, quiet or merry. This is probably rooted in fact as the River runs as a gentle stream for most of its journey to the River Trent.

== Course ==
The Blithe rises in the Hills to the East of Stoke on Trent near Heywood Grange Farm at around 800 feet above sea level. It is joined by several smaller streams as it makes its way towards Caverswall. The River though is still only a small stream at this stage. It passes the village of Blythe Bridge and roughly follows the Stoke to Derby Railway line until it reaches Church Leigh. The countryside is mainly agricultural and is intensively farmed. The River then turns south and flows into Blithfield Reservoir at Newton Hurst. On leaving the reservoir it flows south-east for about another 5 miles, passing the village of Hamstall Ridware until it reaches its confluence with the River Trent at King's Bromley.

== Blithfield Reservoir ==
The River Blithe runs into the Blithfield Reservoir between Stafford and Burton-upon-Trent. The reservoir was constructed by the South Staffordshire Water Company and was opened in 1953. The reservoir is a major water source for South Staffordshire but is also utilised for a range of leisure activities from Angling to Sailing.

== See also ==
- River Blythe
- River Blyth (disambiguation)
