= River Blyth =

River Blyth is the name of several rivers in England.

- River Blyth, Northumberland
- River Blyth, Suffolk

== See also ==
- River Blythe, Warwickshire, England
- River Blithe, Staffordshire, England
- Blyth River (Northern Territory), Australia
