= James Blyth, 1st Baron Blyth =

British businessman (1841–1925)

Baron Blyth in 1900.

James Blyth, 1st Baron Blyth (/ˈblaɪ/ BLY; 10 September 1841 – 8 September 1925), known as Sir James Blyth, 1st Baronet from 1895 to 1907, was a British businessman and liberal party supporter.

== Biography ==
Blyth was the son of James Blyth and he married Caroline, daughter of Henry Gilbey. He notably served as a Director of the wine mercantile firm of W. and A. Gilbey and was a recognized authority on wine culture and wine commerce. He was also deeply interested in agriculture and farming. Apart from his business career, Blyth was a Justice of the Peace for Hertfordshire and Essex and served as vice-president of the Royal Society of Arts. He was created a Baronet, of Blythewood in the Parish of Stansted Mountfitchet in the County of Essex, on 30 August 1895, and on 19 July 1907 he was raised to the peerage as Baron Blyth, of Blythewood in the Parish Stansted Mountfichet in the County of Essex. He was also appointed Grand Cross of Civil Order of the Merito Agricola Portuguese Ordem do Mérito Empresarial, Order of the Medjidie and Order of Leopold (Belgium).

Lord Blyth married Eliza, daughter of William Mooney, in 1865. They had three sons and four daughters.

His son Audley died in mysterious circumstances while in East Africa with John Patterson.

Eliza died in 1894. Lord Blyth survived her by over 30 years and died in September 1925, aged 83. He was succeeded in his titles by his eldest son Herbert.

== Notes ==
Peerage of the United Kingdom
New creation	Baron Blyth; 1907–1925	Succeeded by Herbert William Blyth
Baronetage of the United Kingdom
New creation	Baronet (of Chelmsford); 1895–1925	Succeeded by Herbert Blyth
