= John Comelond =

English politician

John Comelond (fl. 1395) of Shepton Beauchamp, Somerset, was an English politician.

He was a member (MP) of the parliament of England for Wells in 1395.

Parliament of England
Preceded by John Newmaster; Thomas Hore	Member of Parliament for Wells; 1395; With: Nicholas Cristesham	Succeeded by Nicholas More; Thomas Wynchester
