= William Greynton =

English politician

William Greynton (before 1375 – after 1397) of Wells, Somerset, was an English politician.

He was a member (MP) of the parliament of England for Wells in September 1397.

Parliament of England
Preceded by Nicholas More; Thomas Wynchestere	Member of Parliament for Wells; Sept 1397; With: Roger Chapman	Succeeded by Thomas Tanner; John Blithe
