= Morris Llewellyn =

16th-century English politician

Morris Llewelyn, Fflewellyan, Fflewellyn, Fuellen or Fludkyn (by 1522 – will proved 1568), of Wells, Somerset, was an English politician.

He was a member (MP) of the parliament of England for Wells in 1555.

Parliament of England
Preceded by Thomas Lewis; William Godwin	Member of Parliament for Wells; 1555; With: Thomas Lewis	Succeeded by John Aylworth; John Mawdley II
