= Godwyn =

Godwyn is a surname. Notable people with the name include:

- Charles Godwyn (1701–1770), cleric, antiquarian and book collector at the University of Oxford
- James Godwyn (1557–1616), English politician
- Philip Godwyn (died 1574), the member of the Parliament of England
- Richard Godwyn (died 1601), English politician, a Member of the Parliament of England
- Thomas Godwyn (MP) (1561–1586), English politician
- Thomas Godwyn (scholar) D.D. (1587–1642), English headmaster and scholar

== See also ==
- Godwin (disambiguation)
- Goodwyn surname page
- Goodwin (disambiguation)
- Castle Godwyn or Kimsbury hill fort, Iron Age hill fort on Painswick Beacon in the Cotswolds, Gloucestershire, England
