= Thomas Clerke (MP) =

16th-century English politician

Thomas Clerke (c. 1485 – 2 March 1555), of Wookey, Somerset, and London, was an English politician.

== Family ==
Clerke was the second son of Clement Clerke of Great Livermere and Bury St Edmunds, Suffolk, and his wife, Alice. Thomas was probably educated at Bury St Edmunds Grammar School and at the University of Cambridge. By 1523, he had married a woman named Antonia, and they had two sons and two daughters. One of their sons, John Clerke, was MP for Bath, Somerset in the same year his father represented Wells.

== Career ==
He was a Member (MP) of the Parliament of England for Wells in 1547.

Parliament of England
Preceded by John Mawdley; Anthony Gilbert	Member of Parliament for Wells; 1547; With: John Aylworth	Succeeded by John Aylworth; William Godwin
