= Richard Langford (MP for Wells) =

English politician

Richard Langford (fl. 1419) of Wells, Somerset, was an English politician.

== Family ==
Langford married a woman who may have been called Joan. They had two sons, including the MP, Thomas Langford.

== Career ==
He was a member (MP) of the parliament of England for Wells in 1419.

Parliament of England
Preceded by Richard Setter; Hildebrand Elwell	Member of Parliament for Wells; 1419; With: Richard Perys	Succeeded by Richard Setter; Hildebrand Elwell
