= Thomas Wynchestere =

English politician

Thomas Wynchestere (fl. 1397) was an English politician.

He was a member (MP) of the parliament of England for Wells in January 1397. No more is known of him.

Parliament of England
| Preceded by Nicholas Cristesham; John Comelond | Member of Parliament for Wells; 1397; With: Nicholas More | Succeeded by Roger Chapman; William Greynton |
