= James Bisse =

16th-century English politician

James Bisse (c. 1552 – 1607), of Wells, Somerset, was an English politician.

He was a member (MP) of the parliament of England for Wells in 1584.

Parliament of England
Preceded by Ayshton Aylworth; William Bowerman	Member of Parliament for Wells; 1584; With: George Upton	Succeeded by Thomas Godwyn; William Smith
