= Robert Elwell =

English politician

Robert Elwell (fl. 1421) of Wells, Somerset, was an English politician.

== Family ==
Elwell was probably the brother of another Wells MP, Hildebrand Elwell. Robert Elwell married twice. His first wife, Mary, died around 1421. His second wife, Alice, was the widow of another Wells MP, John Russell.

== Career ==
He was a member (MP) of the parliament of England for Wells in December 1421.

Parliament of England
Preceded by Hildebrand Elwell; Richard Perys	Member of Parliament for Wells; 1421; With: John Pedewell	Succeeded by John Welshot; John Mawdley
