= Henry Newton (MP for Wells) =

16th-century English politician

Henry Newton (c. 1531 – 2 May 1599), of East Harptree, Somerset, Barrs Court and Hanham, Gloucestershire, was an English politician.

He was a Member (MP) of the Parliament of England for Wells in 1571.

When Sir Henry Newton was born in 1535 in East Harptree, Somerset, England, his father, Sir John Newton, was 36 and his mother, Lady Margaret Poyntz, was 25. He died on May 2, 1599, in Gloucestershire, England, at the age of 64, and was buried in Bristol, Gloucestershire, England.

He married Katherine Paston (died 1605) by 1579, a daughter of Sir Thomas Paston of Norfolk. She was a gentlewoman in the household of Elizabeth I. The Queen gave her gifts of clothes. They had six children. Their eldest son Theodore Newton married Penelope Rodney, a daughter John Rodney of Rodney Stoke.

Parliament of England
| Preceded by John Aylworth and Ashton Aylworth; John Hippisley | Member of Parliament for Wells; 1571; With: Ashton Aylworth | Succeeded by William Bourman; Ashton Aylworth |
