= John Russell (fl. 1410) =

English politician

John Russell (fl. 1410) of Wells, Somerset, was an English politician.

== Family ==
His wife was named Alice and they probably had two sons, names unknown. After Russell's death, Alice married another Wells MP, Robert Elwell.

== Career ==
Russell was an attorney and tax controller. He was a Member (MP) of the Parliament of England for Wells in 1410.

Parliament of England
Preceded by Walter Duddesden; John Newmaster	Member of Parliament for Wells; 1410; With: Luke Wilton	Succeeded by ? ?
