= Thomas Jay =

15th century English politician

Thomas Jay (fl. 1406), of Wells, Somerset, was an English politician.

He was a member (MP) of the parliament of England for Wells in 1406.

Parliament of England
Preceded by Walter Dyer; John Bowyer	Member of Parliament for Wells; 1406; With: Thomas Wey	Succeeded by Walter Duddesdon; John Newmaster
