= John Welshot =

16th-century English politician

John Welshot (by 1473 – 1518/19) of Wells, Somerset, was an English politician.

== Family ==
Welshot had a wife named Isabel. Together they had two sons and one daughter.

== Career ==
He was a member (MP) of the parliament of England for Wells in 1510.

Parliament of England
Preceded by ? ?	Member of Parliament for Wells; 1510; With: John Mawdley	Succeeded by Walter Sarger; Richard alias Robert Ruynon
