= William Bowerman =

16th-century English politician

William Bowerman (died c. 1590) of Wells, Somerset, was an English politician.

== Family ==
Bowerman married Elizabeth Longe, a widow. They had one son and one daughter.

== Career ==
He was a member (MP) of the parliament of England for Wells in 1572.

Parliament of England
Preceded by Ayshton Aylworth; Henry Newton	Member of Parliament for Wells; 1572; With: Ayshton Aylworth	Succeeded by James Bisse; George Upton
