= Leonard Crosse =

16th-century English politician

Leonard Crosse (died 1610) of Wells, Somerset, was an English politician.

== Family ==
Crosse was married with three sons and two daughters.

== Career ==
Crosse was Mayor of Wells in 1590. He was a member (MP) of the parliament of England for Wells in 1597.

Parliament of England
Preceded by Richard Godwyn; James Godwyn	Member of Parliament for Wells; 1597; With: William Watkins	Succeeded by James Kirton; George Upton
