= Walter Duddesden =

English politician

Walter Duddesden (fl. 1407), of Wells, Somerset, was an English politician.

He was a member (MP) of the parliament of England for Wells in 1407.

Parliament of England
Preceded by Thomas Wey; Thomas Jay	Member of Parliament for Wells; 1407; With: John Newmaster	Succeeded by John Russell; Luke Wilton
