= John Horewode =

John Horewode may refer to:

- John Horewode (MP for Wells) (died 1417)
- John Horewode (MP for Chipping Wycombe) (fl.1421), represented Chipping Wycombe
