= William Watkin (MP for Wells) =

16th-century English politician

William Watkin (fl. 1592–1597) of Wells, Somerset, was an English politician.

Watkin was Mayor of Wells in 1592. He was a member (MP) of the parliament of England for Wells in 1597.

Parliament of England
Preceded by Richard Godwyn; James Godwyn	Member of Parliament for Wells; 1597; With: Leonard Crosse	Succeeded by James Kirton; George Upton
