= Mawdley =

Mawdley may refer to:

- John Mawdley (died 1540), MP for Wells in 1510 and 1523
- John Mawdley (died 1572), MP for Wells in 1529, 1539, 1545, April 1554, 1558 and 1559; son of the above
- Roger Mawdley (died 1630), MP for Poole in 1597
