= Thomas Wey =

English politician

Thomas Wey (fl. 1406) of Wells, Somerset, was an English politician.

He was a member (MP) of the parliament of England for Wells in 1406.

Parliament of England
Preceded by Walter Dyer; John Bowyer	Member of Parliament for Wells; 1406; With: Thomas Jay	Succeeded by Walter Duddesdon; John Newmaster
