= William Smith (died 1591) =

English politician

William Smith (died 1591), of Wells, Somerset, was an English politician.

He was a member (MP) of the parliament of England for Wells in 1586.

Parliament of England
Preceded by James Bisse; George Upton	Member of Parliament for Wells; 1586; With: Thomas Godwyn	Succeeded by Thomas Purfrey; John Ayshe
