= Anthony Gilbert (MP) =

16th-century English politician

Anthony Gilbert (c. 1499–1555), of East Coker, Corton Denham, and Wells, Somerset, was an English politician.

He was a member (MP) of the parliament of England for Wells in 1545.

Parliament of England
| Preceded by John Godwin; James Dyer | Member of Parliament for Wells; 1545; With: John Mawdley | Succeeded by Thomas Clerke; John Aylworth |
