= John Godwin =

John Godwin may refer to:

== Politicians ==
- John Godwin (died c. 1547), MP for Wells
- John Godwin (by 1507 – 1556 or later), MP for Wells
- John Venimore Godwin (1814–1898), photographer and mayor of Bradford, 1865–1866

== Sportspeople ==
- John Godwin (baseball) (1877–1956), American baseball player
- John Godwin (rower) (1904–1973), British rowing coxswain

== Others ==
- John Godwin (Royal Navy officer) (1919–1945), British Naval Reserve officer during World War II
- John Godwin (architect) (1928–2023), Nigerian British architect

== See also ==
- John Goodwin (disambiguation)
