= Elwell =

Elwell may refer to:

- Elwell, Devon, England
- Elwell, Michigan, United States
- Elwell Liberty, part of Wyke Regis and Elwell Liberty

== People with the surname ==
- Ann Elwell (1922–1996), British linguist and intelligence officer
- Clare Elwell, British medical physicist
- Clarence Edward Elwell (1904–1973), American Catholic prelate
- Cyril Frank Elwell (1884–1963), Australian-born American radio pioneer
- Daniel Elwell, FAA administrator
- Dennis Elwell (disambiguation)
  - Dennis Elwell (astrologer) (1930–2014), British astrologer
  - Dennis Elwell (politician) (born 1945), American politician from New Jersey
- Francis Edwin Elwell (1858–1922), American sculptor
- Edward Elwell (1783–1869), founder of the manufacturing company Edward Elwell Ltd in Wednesbury, England
- Frederick William Elwell (1870–1958), English painter
- Esther Elwell, American accused witch
- James T. Elwell, American developer and legislator
- Joseph Bowne Elwell (1873–1920), American bridge player and writer
- Keith Elwell (born 1950), British rugby player
- Herbert Elwell (1898–1974), American music critic and composer
- Hildebrand Elwell, English politician
- Robert Elwell (fl. 1417–1431), English politician
- Stuart Elwell (born 1977), English boxer
