= Aylworth (surname) =

Aylworth is a surname. Notable people with the surname include:

- John Aylworth (by 1516–1575), English politician
- Ashton Aylworth (died by 1602), English politician
- Edward Aylworth, MP for Callington (UK Parliament constituency)
