= Richard Ferrour =

English politician

- Died: 1402/03

Richard Ferrour (before 1365 – 1402/03), of Wells, Somerset, was an English politician.

He was a Member (MP) of the Parliament of England for Wells in February 1388.

Parliament of England
Preceded by Nicholas Cristesham; Thomas Phelpes	Member of Parliament for Wells; 1388; With: Nicholas Cristesham	Succeeded by John Blithe; Thomas Hore
