= John Godwin (died c. 1547) =

16th-century English politician

John Godwin (by 1520 – 1547?) of Wells, Somerset, was an English politician.

He was a member (MP) of the parliament of England for Wells in 1542.

Parliament of England
Preceded by John Mawdley; John Godwin	Member of Parliament for Wells; 1542; With: James Dyer	Succeeded by John Mawdley; Anthony Gilbert
