= John Bowyer (MP for Wells) =

English politician (fl. 1404)

John Bowyer (fl. 1404), of Wells, Somerset, was an English politician.

He was a member (MP) of the parliament of England for Wells in October 1404.

Parliament of England
Preceded by Roger Chapman; Richard Groos	Member of Parliament for Wells; With: Walter Dyer	Succeeded by Thomas Wey; Thomas Jay
