= Richard Groos =

English politician

Richard Groos (died 1407), of Wells, Somerset, was an English politician.

== Family ==
Groos was married to a woman named Agnes and they had two sons. After Groos' death, Agnes married Luke Wilton.

== Career ==
He was a Member (MP) of the Parliament of England for Wells in January 1404.

Parliament of England
Preceded by John Wycombe; Roger Chapman	Member of Parliament for Wells; Jan. 1404; With: Roger Chapman	Succeeded by Walter Dyer; John Bowyer
