= Ferrour =

Ferrour is a surname. Notable people with the surname include:

- Richard Ferrour, English MP
- John Ferrour, of the Peasants' Revolt
- Johanna Ferrour of the Peasants' Revolt
