= Thomas Phelpes =

English politician

Thomas Phelpes (fl. 1386) of Wells, Somerset, was an English politician.

== Career ==
He was a member (MP) of the parliament of England for Wells in 1386.

Parliament of England
Preceded by {{{before}}}	Member of Parliament for Wells; 1386; With: Nicholas Cristesham	Succeeded by Nicholas Cristesham; Richard Ferrour
