= Simon Bailly =

English politician

Simon Bailly (fl. 1416) of Wells, Somerset, was an English politician.

== Family ==
Bailly married twice, his first wife was named Agnes; his second wife's name is unrecorded.

== Career ==
He was a member (MP) of the parliament of England for Wells in October 1416.

Parliament of England
Preceded by ? ?	Member of Parliament for Wells; 1416; With: John Cutte	Succeeded by Richard Setter; Hildebrand Eelwell
