= Lynch Maydon =

British Navy officer and politician

Lieutenant-Commander Lynch Maydon DSO DSC

Member of Parliament for Wells
- In office 25 October 1951 – 29 May 1970
- Preceded by: Dennis Coleridge Boles
- Succeeded by: Robert Boscawen

Personal details
- Born: Stephen Lynch Conway Maydon; 15 December 1913 Pietermaritzburg, South Africa
- Died: 2 March 1971 (aged 57) Bristol, England
- Party: Conservative
- Spouse: Joan Baker
- Children: 3
- Awards: Distinguished Service Order and bar; Distinguished Service Cross

Military service
- Branch/service: Royal Navy
- Years of service: 1927–1948
- Rank: Lieutenant-Commander
- Commands: HMS L26; HMS Umbra; HMS Tradewind
- Battles/wars: World War II

Lieutenant-Commander Stephen Lynch Conway Maydon DSO DSC (15 December 1913 – 2 March 1971) was a British Navy officer and Conservative politician. He served in the Royal Navy and was later the Member of Parliament (MP) for Wells in Somerset from 1951 to 1970, during which he briefly served as a government minister.

== Early life and military service ==
Maydon was born in South Africa in 1913. His father John, after whom Maydon Wharf in Durban is named, was a member of the Natal Legislative Assembly and he was born in Pietermaritzburg. He however moved to Britain at the age of 4 after the death of his father and was brought up in Britain and schooled at Twyford School near Winchester. He showed an early interest in the Royal Navy, enlisting in 1931, and studied at the Royal Naval College in Dartmouth.

During the Second World War Maydon commanded submarines HMS L26, HMS Umbra and HMS Tradewind. Commanding Tradewind, he torpedoed 14 Japanese vessels, none of which were warships. One of these, torpedoed on 18 September 1944, was Jun'yō Maru, on its way from Java to Sumatra, carrying 1,450 mostly Dutch prisoner of war slave laborers and 4,200 Javanese slave laborers. 5,620 of those on board died, making this the biggest single action friendly loss of life in history and the highest death count in history from a single British action. Maydon was married to Joan (née Baker) until his death, and they had three sons.

== Political career ==
At the 1950 general election, Maydon fought Bristol South, a safe Labour constituency. He was then chosen for the safe Conservative seat of Wells, which he won in the 1951 election. Peter Thorneycroft, then President of the Board of Trade, named him as his Parliamentary Private Secretary in 1952; he served for only a year.

After the 1959 general election, Maydon was Chairman of the Conservative Parliamentary Party Defence Committee for two years. Harold Macmillan brought him into government as Joint Parliamentary Secretary to the Ministry of Pensions and National Insurance from July 1962, where he served alongside Margaret Thatcher. He retained this office under Sir Alec Douglas-Home.

Maydon was a right-winger who supported the use of corporal punishment, arguing that it was an effective sentence as a last resort. He opposed sanctions against Rhodesia and voted against the Race Relations Act 1968 (which made it illegal to refuse housing, employment, or public services to a person on the grounds of colour, race, ethnic or national origins) and also opposed House of Lords Reform. In 1968 he declared to the House of Commons that he was '[...] one of the few—I believe perhaps the only—Member of this House who supports and believes in apartheid.'

Amid poor health, attributed to his military career, he retired at the 1970 general election. He died less than a year later, on 2 March 1971, at a hospital in Bristol.

== Sources ==
- M. Stenton and S. Lees, "Who's Who of British MPs" Vol. IV (Harvester Press, 1981)
- Philip Norton, "Dissension in the House of Commons 1945-1974" (Macmillan, 1975)

Parliament of the United Kingdom
Preceded by Dennis Coleridge Boles	Member of Parliament for Wells; 1951–1970	Succeeded by Robert Boscawen
