= Walter Dyer =

Walter Dyer may refer to:

- Walter Alden Dyer (1878–1943), American author
- Walter Dyer (chairperson) (1882–1965), New Zealand chairperson of many education organisations
- Walter Dyer (MP) (died c.1423), English politician
