= John Hall (1632–1711) =

English politician and landowner

John Hall (17 May 1632 – 1711) was an English politician and landowner.

He was the eldest son of Sir Thomas Hall (1600–63), who acted as a Royalist commissioner during the English Civil War. Following the death of his father, John became head of the Halls, a wealthy gentry family, whose principal residence was 'The Hall', in Bradford-on-Avon, Wiltshire.

Hall served as justice of the peace for Somerset in 1662–80 and for Wiltshire in 1673–80 and from 1689 until his death in 1711. He was appointed High Sheriff of Wiltshire for 1669–70.

Hall was the member of parliament (MP) for Wells, Somerset, from 1673 to 1679 and from 1680 to 1685.

He married twice: first to Susan, the daughter and heiress of Francis Cox of Wells and secondly Elizabeth, daughter of Sir Thomas Thynne of Richmond, Surrey. He had no legitimate children and left his estate to his great-niece Rachel Baynton (reputedly his illegitimate daughter), who later married William Pierrepont, Earl of Kingston-upon-Hull.

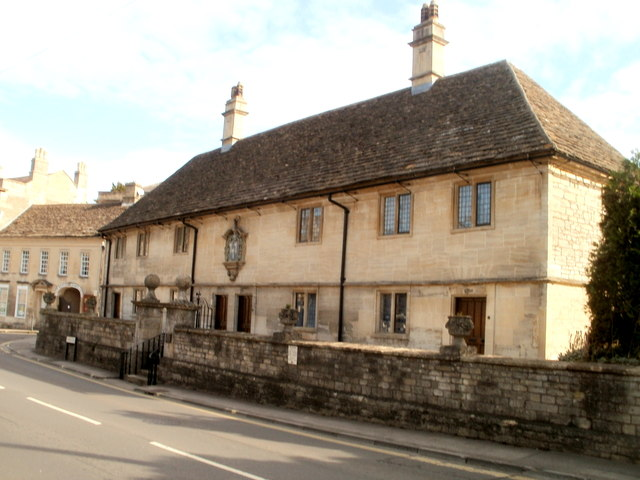
Men' Almshouses, Bradford-on-Avon

Towards the end of his life Hall built the Men's Almshouses in Bradford-on-Avon, providing for four old men. The building has the Hall arms in the front, and is dated 1700.

Parliament of England
Preceded by Maurice Berkeley; Richard Butler	Member of Parliament for Wells; 1673–1679; With: Maurice Berkeley	Succeeded by Edward Berkeley; William Coward
Preceded by Edward Berkeley; William Coward	Member of Parliament for Wells; 1680–1685; With: William Coward	Succeeded by Edward Berkeley; Thomas Wyndham
