= Thomas Godwin (bishop) =

English bishop (1517–1590)

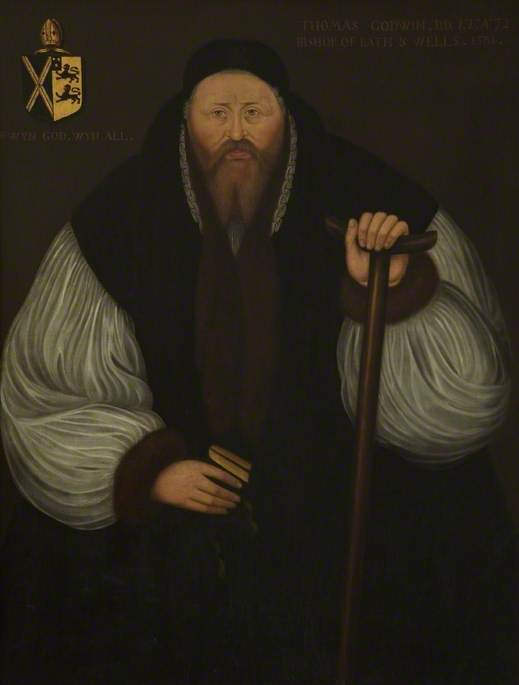
- Title: Bishop of Bath and Wells

Personal life
- Born: 1517 Wokingham, Berkshire
- Died: 1590 (aged 73) Wokingham, Berkshire
- Resting place: All Saints' Church, Wokingham
- Spouse: (1) Isabel Purefoy (2) Sybill

Religious life
- Religion: Church of England

Senior posting
- Based in: England
- Period in office: 1584- 1590
- Predecessor: Gilbert Berkeley
- Successor: John Still
- Previous post: Dean of Canterbury (1567- 1584)

Thomas Godwin (1517 – 19 November 1590) was an English bishop, who presided over the Diocese of Bath and Wells.

== Life ==
Thomas Godwin was both born and died in Wokingham in Berkshire. For tuition he entered the household of Richard Layton, then Archdeacon of Buckingham and subsequently Dean of York. Sponsored by Layton, he proceeded to Magdalen College, Oxford, graduating B.A. in 1543, gaining a fellowship, and proceeding M.A. in 1547. When Magdalen College established a school at Brackley, Godwin was appointed its first headmaster.

On the accession of the Catholic Queen Mary, Godwin was obliged to leave the school. To support his young family he returned to Oxford to study medicine, graduating B.Med. with licence to practice medicine on 17 June 1555.

After the accession of Queen Elizabeth he turned to divinity. Godwin rapidly became a popular reformation preacher. Elizabeth I was so pleased with his 'good parts' and 'goodly person' that in 1565 she appointed him one of her Lenten preachers. In June 1565 he was appointed Dean of Christ Church, Oxford, and proceeded B.D. and D.D. When Elizabeth visited Oxford in August 1566, Godwin was one of the four divines appointed to hold theological disputations before her. Among the Parker MSS.(Corpus Christi College, Cambridge) is a sermon preached by him before the queen at Greenwich during 1566.

The winter after her visit to Oxford Elizabeth promoted Godwin to Dean of Canterbury a post he held from March 1567 for 17 years (1567-1584). In 1576 he became one of the ecclesiastical commissioners. Elizabeth later appointed him Bishop of Bath and Wells on 10 August 1584.

== Family ==
Godwin was first married to Isabella Purefoy and had nine children. In later life at Wells he married a widow, not (as many old writers claimed) Margaret "Brennan" or "Boreman", recte Bowerman (who in fact married Thomas Godwin jnr), but one Sybill, who was buried on 1 December 1587 at Banwell, Somerset.

- Thomas Godwin, MP for Wells, who married Margaret, daughter of William Bowerman, MP for Wells.
- Francis Godwin, Bishop of Llandaff and of Hereford
- Robert Godwin, parson
- Matthew Godwin, Master of Music at Exeter Cathedral
- Paul Godwin, Canon of Wells Cathedral
- Margaret Swift (née Godwin), wife of Reverend Thomas Swift, rector of St. Andrew's Church, Canterbury. They were great-great-grandparents to the satirist Jonathan Swift, author of Gulliver's Travels. Margaret and their children are buried at Canterbury Cathedral.
- Blandia Purfrey (née Godwin), wife of Thomas Purfrey, MP for Wells
- Joyce Godwin
- Anne Godwin

== Bishop of Bath and Wells ==
Godwin was appointed to Wells in September 1584 at the age of 67 the second of the Protestant bishops consecrated. The see had been void for three years and came with difficult canons. While at Wells and long widowed, he lived a semi-invalid life increasingly lame with gout. Several of his family and extended family were also reverends and canons, his son Francis Godwin, the ecclesiastical historian, later becoming Bishop of Llandaff. Others immersed themselves in local politics.

During his time as bishop Sir Walter Raleigh tried to seize the manor and lands of Banwell from the bishopric on a hundred years' lease. When Bishop Thomas Godwin refused, Sir Walter Raleigh chose to demean the Bishop to Elizabeth 1st (who was against bishops marrying) stating incorrectly the bishop had married a much younger woman. This incensed the queen despite The Earl of Bedford warmly defending the bishop. In order to save Banwell for the bishopric Godwin had to lease Wilscombe Manor to Raleigh instead. However the damage to Godwin's long standing reputation with the queen had been done.

Suffering from quartan ague, Bishop Thomas Godwin returned home to Wokingham, Berkshire in 1590 where on 19 November 1590 he died. He was buried under the chancel of the parish church of All Saints' Church, Wokingham with an inscription by his son Francis sub-dean of Exeter, later Bishop of Llandaff.

On his death the See of Bath and Wells was left in an on-going situation of mistrust and corruption among its canons which Godwin had been unable to deal with.

Academic offices
Preceded by Thomas Sampson	Dean of Christ Church, Oxford; 1565–1567	Succeeded by Thomas Cooper
Church of England titles
Preceded by Nicholas Wotton	Dean of Canterbury; 1567–1584	Succeeded by Richard Rogers
Preceded by Gilbert Berkeley	Bishop of Bath and Wells; 1584–1590	Succeeded by John Still
