= James Kirton =

James Kirton may refer to:

- James Kirton (swimmer), British swimmer
- James Kirton (died 1620), MP for Ludgershall and Great Bedwyn
- James Kirton (MP for Wells) (died 1611)
