= John Ayshe =

English politician

John Ayshe (fl. 1589–1608) of Wells, Somerset, was an English politician.

He was a member (MP) of the parliament of England for Wells in 1589. He was Mayor of Wells in 1598 and 1608.

Parliament of England
Preceded by Thomas Godwyn; William Smith	Member of Parliament for Wells; 1589; With: Thomas Purfrey	Succeeded by Richard Goodwin; James Goodwin
