= Junyo =

Junyo (sometimes written Dyunyo) may refer to either of the Japanese ships:

- Japanese aircraft carrier Jun'yō
- Jun'yō Maru, a Japanese cargo ship, built in 1913 and sunk in 1944
