= John Hynden =

English politician

John Hynden (fl. November 1414), of Wells, Somerset, was an English politician.

He was a member (MP) of the parliament of England for Wells in November 1414.

Parliament of England
Preceded by John Podmore; Thomas Dynt	Member of Parliament for Wells; 1414; With: Thomas Dynt	Succeeded by ? ?
