= Hynden =

Hynden may refer to:

- Hynden Walch, voice actress
- John Hynden, politician
