= John Cutte =

English politician

John Cutte (fl. 1416) of Wells, Somerset, was an English politician.

== Family ==
Cutte was married with two sons. Their names are unknown.

== Career ==
He was a member (MP) of the parliament of England for Wells in October 1416.

Parliament of England
| Preceded by ? ? | Member of Parliament for Wells; 1416; With: Simon Bailly | Succeeded by Richard Setter; Hildebrand Eelwell |
