= Thomas Dynt =

English politician

Thomas Dynt or Dent (fl. 1414) of Wells, Somerset, was an English politician.

He was a member (MP) of the parliament of England for Wells in April 1414 and November 1414. He was pledged by another Wells MP, John Wycombe.
