= Hedworth Jolliffe, 2nd Baron Hylton =

British peer and Member of Parliament

The Right Honourable The Lord Hylton DL

Member of the House of Lords Lord Temporal
- In office 1 June 1876 – 31 October 1899; Hereditary Peerage
- Preceded by: The 1st Lord Hylton
- Succeeded by: The 3rd Lord Hylton

Member of Parliament for Wells
- In office 1855 – 7 December 1868
- Preceded by: Robert Tudway
- Succeeded by: constituency abolished

Personal details
- Born: 23 June 1829
- Died: 31 October 1899 (aged 70)
- Party: Conservative
- Education: Eton College; Oriel College, Oxford

Hedworth Hylton Jolliffe, 2nd Baron Hylton DL (23 June 1829 – 31 October 1899), was a British peer and Conservative Member of Parliament.

== Birth and education ==
Hylton was the second son of William George Hylton Jolliffe, 1st Baron Hylton, and Eleanor Paget. He was educated at Eton and Oriel College, Oxford.

== Crimean War service ==
In 1849, he joined the 4th Light Dragoons and served in the Crimean War, where his older brother was killed at Sebastopol. He was present at the Charge of the Light Brigade. He retired from the Army in 1856, following his election to Parliament.

== Parliamentary service ==
He was elected to the House of Commons for Wells in 1855, a seat he held until 1868.

In 1870 he succeeded his father as second Baron Hylton and entered the House of Lords.

== Marriages ==
Lord Hylton married his second cousin, Lady Agnes Mary Byng, daughter of George Byng, 2nd Earl of Strafford, in 1858. Their divorce was a Cause célèbre. There were children of this marriage, sons and a daughter, Agatha Eleanor Augusta Jolliffe, who married Ailwyn Fellowes MP.

Lord Hylton married again to Anne, daughter of Henry Lambert, who was the second wife and the widow of the third Earl of Dunraven.

== Death and succession ==
He died in October 1899, aged 70, and was succeeded in his titles by his surviving son Hylton George Hylton Jolliffe.

== Notes ==
Parliament of the United Kingdom
Preceded by Sir William Goodenough Hayter and Robert Charles Tudway	Member of Parliament for Wells; 1855–1868; With: Sir William Goodenough Hayter 1856–1868; Arthur Divett Hayter 1865–1868	Constituency abolished
Peerage of the United Kingdom
Preceded by William Jolliffe	Baron Hylton; 1870–1899	Succeeded by Hylton George Hylton Jolliffe
