= Dennis Boles (British Army officer) =

British Army officer and politician (1885–1958)

Boles in 1930.

Lieutenant-Colonel Dennis Coleridge Boles (4 June 1885 – 25 April 1958) was a British Army officer and Conservative Party politician in the United Kingdom.

Dennis Boles was the son of Francis James Coleridge Boles (brother of Sir Dennis Boles) of Rackenford Manor, Devon and Charlotte Jones (sister of Walter Jones) of The Elms, Warrington and Adelaide Crescent, Hove. He was educated at Eton College, where he was President of "Pop", and set a record score of 183 in the Eton v Harrow cricket match at Lord's in 1904. He also played cricket for Devon in the Minor Counties Championship between 1903 and 1909.

After attending the Royal Military College, Sandhurst, where he won the Sword of Honour, he was commissioned in the 17th Lancers and served in India. In the Great War he served on the Staff of the 5th Indian Cavalry Brigade in France, and then saw active service in France and Ireland as Adjutant of the 17th Lancers. Boles was a noted polo player, winning the Coronation Cup for the 17th Lancers against an Argentine team in 1922, and playing for the British Army against the American Army in 1925 at the Hurlingham Club in London. In 1928 he became lieutenant-colonel of the Royal Horse Guards, and Silver Stick to the King, before leaving the Army in 1936.

He was elected unopposed as the member of parliament (MP) for Wells in Somerset at a by-election in December 1939, and held the seat until he stepped down at the 1951 general election.

He married Monica, the daughter of John Reid-Walker of Ruckley Grange, Shifnal, in 1921 and had two sons and one daughter. He lived at Barrow Court, Galhampton, Somerset; and Forsinard Lodge, Sutherland.

Parliament of the United Kingdom
Preceded by Anthony Muirhead	Member of Parliament for Wells; 1939–1951	Succeeded by Lynch Maydon
