= Thomas White (died 1670) =

British politician, born 1630

Thomas White (ca. 1630 – 1670) was an English lawyer and politician who sat in the House of Commons in 1659 and 1660.

White was the eldest son of Daniel White of West Lavington, Wiltshire and his first wife Jane. He was admitted at Inner Temple in 1647 and called to the bar in 1654. He became Recorder of Wells in about 1656 and succeeded to the property of his father in 1659. In 1659 he was elected member of parliament (MP) for Wells in Somerset for the Third Protectorate Parliament. He was elected MP for Wells again in April 1660 for the Convention Parliament. He became a J.P. for Somerset in July 1660. He was commissioner for sewers in August and December 1660, and commissioner for assessment from August 1660 to 1663. In 1662 the commissioners for corporations removed him from the bench and dismissed him as recorder.

White died at the age of about 40 and was buried in Wells cathedral on 25 August 1670.

White married Jane Bull, daughter of William Bull of Shapwick, Somerset on 4 March 1656 and had a son and three daughters.

Parliament of England
Preceded by John Jenkyn	Member of Parliament for Wells; 1659; With: Sir Lislebone Long	Not represented in restored Rump
Not represented in restored Rump	Member of Parliament for Wells; 1660; With: Henry Bull	Succeeded by Sir Maurice Berkeley; Lord Richard Butler
