= List of mayors of Wells =

Mayor of Wells, Somerset, England:

- 1590: Leonard Crosse
- 1592: William Watkin
- 1593–1594: James Godwyn
- 1598: John Ayshe
- 1608: John Ayshe
- 1613–1614: James Godwyn
- 1750–1751 John Dorset Long
- 1751–1752 Thomas Strode
- 1752–1753 Charles Tudway
- 1753–1754 John Sutton
- 1754–1755 Robert Holloway
- 1755–1756 Charles Tudway
- 1756–1757 Thomas Miller
- 1757–1758 William Keate
- 1758–1759 John Long
- 1759–1760 John Sutton
- 1760–1761 William Nicholls
- 1761–1762 Charles Tudway
- 1762–1763 Joseph Lovell
- 1763–1764 Clement Tudway
- 1764–1765 Thomas Miller
- 1765–1766 Robert Tudway
- 1766–1767 William Rood
- 1767–1768 Charles Tudway
- 1768–1769 James Flood
- 1769–1770 Joseph Lovell
- 1770–1771 Thomas Millard
- 1771–1772 Robert Tudway
- 1772–1773 Clement Tudway
- 1773–1774 William Rood
- 1774–1775 Joseph Lovell
- 1775–1776 Clement Tudway
- 1776–1777 Thomas Millard
- 1777–1778 Robert Tudway
- 1778–1779 John Brock
- 1779–1780 William Rood
- 1780–1781 Clement Tudway
- 1781–1782 Joseph Lovell
- 1782–1783 Thomas Millard
- 1783–1784 William Rood
- 1784–1785 Clement Tudway
- 1785–1786 John Allford
- 1786–1787 John Brock
- 1787–1788 Clement Tudway
- 1788–1789 Thomas Millard
- 1789–1790 John Lovell
- 1790–1791 John Allford
- 1791–1792 Clement Tudway
- 1792–1793 George Lax
- 1793–1794 John Brock
- 1794–1795 Clement Tudway
- 1795–1796 Thomas Millard
- 1796–1797 John Lovell
- 1797–1798 Clement Tudway
- 1798–1799 George Lax
- 1799–1800 John Brock
- 1800–1801 Robert Lax
- 1801–1802 Edward Goldesborough
- 1802–1803 George Lax
- 1803–1804 Clement Tudway
- 1804–1805 Francis Drake
- 1805–1806 John Porch
- 1806–1807 Robert Lax
- 1807–1808 Edward Goldesborough
- 1808–1809 Clement Tudway
- 1809–1810 George Lax
- 1810–1811 John Paine Tudway
- 1811–1812 Joseph Teek
- 1812–1813 Edward Spencer
- 1813–1814 Maurice Davies
- 1814–1815 Henry Brookes
- 1815–1816 Robert Lax
- 1816–1817 Henry Brookes
- 1817–1818 Francis Besly
- 1818–1819 Joseph Teek
- 1819–1820 Henry Brookes
- 1820–1821 Stephen Davies
- 1821–1822 Henry Hope
- 1822–1823 Robert Brooks
- 1823–1824 Henry Brookes
- 1824–1825 Francis Besly
- 1825–1826 Henry Hope
- 1826–1827 Henry Brookes
- 1827–1828 Edward Spencer
- 1828–1829 Stephen Davies
- 1829–1830 Robert Welsh
- 1830–1831 John Lax
- 1831–1832 John Nicholls
- 1832–1833 John Lax
- 1833–1834 Francis Besly
- 1834–1835 Robert Brooks
- 1835–1836 Joseph Lovell
- 1836–1837 Joseph Lovell
- 1837–1838 John Lax
- 1838–1839 William Inman Welsh
- 1839–1840 Joseph Giles
- 1840–1841 John Fry
- 1841–1842 William Inman Welsh
- 1842–1843 John Belfour Plowman
- 1843–1844 James Garrod
- 1844–1845 William Perkins
- 1845–1846 James Garrod
- 1846–1847 John Belfour Plowman
- 1847–1848 Henry Bernard
- 1848–1849 Henry Bernard
- 1849–1850 Edward Nicklin Wells
- 1850–1851 Edward Nicklin Wells
- 1855-? (13 times by 1887) John Gifford Everett
- 1890–1892 Jonathan Slater
- 1897–1898 James Tate
- 1902–1904 Sidney Tom Richards (Conservative)
- 1913–1919 G.W. Wheeler
- 1921–1922 William Reakes
- 1923–1924 Edwin Crease
- 1926 Edwin Crease
- 1947–1949 Ernest Sheldon
- 1954–1956 Florence (Flooray) Melrose
- 1963–1965 Lillian M Osmond
- 1970–1971 Wilhelmina Pinching
- 1974–1975 David Tudway Quilter
- 1975–1976 Neil Mitchell
- 1976–1977 George Algar
- 1977–1978 Christine Stiles
- 1978–1979 Harry Parkes
- 1979–1980 Ernest Wright
- 1980–1981 Christina Baron
- 1981–1982 Helen Barrett
- 1982–1983 Stephen Fowler
- 1983–1984 Eileen Giles
- 1984–1985 Graham Livings
- 1985–1986 Peter Wride
- 1986–1987 Nan Rennett
- 1987–1988 Norman Kennedy
- 1988–1989 Pat Robinson
- 1989–1990 Josephine Robinson
- 1990–1991 Harvey Siggs
- 1991–1992 Sheila Pierce
- 1992–1993 Alan Hague
- 1993–1994 Kate Fry
- 1994–1995 John Howett
- 1995–1996 Nick Denison
- 1996–1997 Isobel Marshall
- 1997–1998 Roy Mackenzie
- 1998–1999 Rosemary Woods
- 1999–2000 Maureen Brandon
- 2000–2001 Desmond Gripper
- 2001–2002 David Anderson
- 2002–2003 Jean Hague
- 2003–2004 Colin Price
- 2004–2005 Harvey Siggs
- 2005–2006 Norman Kennedy
- 2006–2007 Simon Davies
- 2007–2008 David Anderson
- 2008–2010 Christina Borastero
- 2010–2011 Tony Robbins
- 2011–2012 Danny Unwin
- 2012–2013 Maureen Brandon
- 2013–2014 Theo Butt Philip
- 2014–2015 Chris Briton
- 2015–2016 Gordon Wilson
- 2016–2017 Alison Gibson
- 2017–2018 John North
- 2018–2019 Celia Wride
- 2019–2020 John Osman
- 2020–2022 Philip Welch
- 2022–2023 Stewart Cursley
- 2023–2024 Tanys Pullin
- 2024–2025 Jasmine Browne (650th Mayor of Wells)
