= Hylton Jolliffe, 3rd Baron Hylton =

British peer and Conservative politician

The Right Honourable The Lord Hylton

Deputy Chief Whip of the House of Lords Captain of the Yeomen of the Guard
- In office 21 May 1918 – 22 January 1924
- Monarch: George V
- Prime Minister: David Lloyd George; Bonar Law; Stanley Baldwin
- Preceded by: The Lord Suffield
- Succeeded by: The Lord Loch

Lord-in-waiting Government Whip
- In office 9 June 1915 – 18 May 1918
- Monarch: George V
- Prime Minister: H. H. Asquith; David Lloyd George
- Preceded by: The Lord Ranksborough
- Succeeded by: The Lord Somerleyton

Member of the House of Lords Lord Temporal
- In office 31 October 1899 – 26 May 1945; Hereditary peerage
- Preceded by: The 2nd Baron Hylton
- Succeeded by: The 4th Baron Hylton

Member of Parliament for Wells
- In office 7 August 1895 – 31 October 1899
- Preceded by: Sir Richard Paget, Bt.
- Succeeded by: Robert Edmund Dickinson

Personal details
- Born: 10 November 1862
- Died: 26 May 1945 (aged 82)
- Party: Conservative

Hylton George Hylton Jolliffe, 3rd Baron Hylton (10 November 1862 – 26 May 1945) was a British peer and Conservative politician.

Hylton was the eldest son of Hedworth Jolliffe, 2nd Baron Hylton, and Lady Agnes Mary Byng. Henry Paget, 1st Marquess of Anglesey was his maternal great-grandfather.

== Career ==
George succeeded the barony in 1899; prior to that he was educated at Eton college and Oriel College, Oxford. He pursued a brief military career as capital for the Somerset imperial yeomanry, then diplomatic service in 1888, then 3rd secretary in 1890 and 2nd secretary in 1894. He became Justice of the peace and county Alderman for Somerset where he sat in politics.

Hylton entered the Diplomatic Service in 1888, but in 1895 he was elected to the House of Commons for Wells. He held this seat until 1899, when he succeeded his father as third Baron Hylton and entered the House of Lords. In June 1915 Hylton was appointed a Lord-in-waiting (government whip in the House of Lords) in the newly formed coalition government, and in 1918 he was promoted him to Captain of the Yeomen of the Guard. The coalition government of David Lloyd George fell in 1922, but Hylton continued as Deputy Chief Whip also under Bonar Law and Stanley Baldwin. However, after the first Baldwin government fell in January 1924, he never returned to office.

He was created Viscount Hylton and owned much of Chaldon, of which he was Lord of the manor.

Lord Hylton married Lady Alice Adeliza Hervey, daughter of Frederick Hervey, 3rd Marquess of Bristol, in 1896. He died in May 1945, aged 82, and was succeeded in his titles by his son William George Hervey Jolliffe. Lady Hylton died in 1962.

Parliament of the United Kingdom
Preceded by Sir Richard Horner Paget	Member of Parliament for Wells; 1895–1899	Succeeded by Robert Edmund Dickinson
Political offices
Preceded by (new government)	Lord-in-waiting; 1916–1918	Succeeded by The Lord Somerleyton
Preceded by The Lord Suffield	Captain of the Yeomen of the Guard; 1918–1924	Vacant
Preceded by The Lord Colebrooke and The Duke of Devonshire	Government Chief Whip in the House of Lords; 1916–1922; With: The Lord Colebrooke	Succeeded by The Earl of Clarendon
Peerage of the United Kingdom
Preceded by Hedworth Hylton Jolliffe	Baron Hylton; 1899–1945	Succeeded by William George Hervey Jolliffe
