= Anthony Muirhead =

British Army officer & MP (1890-1939)

Anthony Muirhead MC TD MP

Member of Parliament for Wells
- In office 1929–1939
- Preceded by: Robert Sanders
- Succeeded by: Dennis Boles

Under-Secretary of State for Air
- In office 1937–1938
- Preceded by: Philip Sassoon
- Succeeded by: Harold Balfour

Personal details
- Born: 4 November 1890
- Died: 29 October 1939 (aged 48)
- Cause of death: Suicide
- Resting place: Great Haseley, Oxfordshire, England
- Party: Conservative

Military service
- Allegiance: United Kingdom
- Branch/service: British Army
- Rank: Lieutenant-colonel
- Unit: Queen's Own Oxfordshire Hussars; 100th (Worcestershire and Oxfordshire Yeomanry) Field Brigade; 53rd Anti-Tank Regiment
- Awards: Military Cross (1917)

Lieutenant-Colonel Anthony John Muirhead MC & Bar TD (4 November 1890 – 29 October 1939) was a Conservative Party politician in the United Kingdom. He was educated at Eton College, the Royal Military Academy, Woolwich, and then at Magdalen College, Oxford. He was elected at the 1929 general election as Member of Parliament (MP) for Wells in Somerset, and held the seat until his death in 1939, aged 48.

== Military career ==
Having been a member of Oxford University Officers' Training Corps, Muirhead was commissioned into the Territorial Force (TF) on the outbreak of World War I in August 1914 as a Second lieutenant in the Queen's Own Oxfordshire Hussars. He was promoted to Lieutenant in March 1915. He served as Aide-de-camp to Major-General Robert Fanshawe, General Officer Commanding 48th (South Midland) Division. He was promoted to Captain in May 1917 and was awarded the Military Cross (MC) in June that year. He became a General Staff Officer Grade 3 with 48th Divisional Headquarters in September 1917, and then was appointed Brigade major to 119th Brigade under the command of Brigadier-General Frank Percy Crozier. In January 1919 Muirhead was awarded a Bar to his MC for his service with 119th Bde at Armentières in the closing days of the war in 1918. He was promoted to Brevet Major in January 1919 and was also Mentioned in dispatches three times during the war.

After the war Crozier became an adviser to the Lithuanian Army in 1919–20 during the Lithuanian Wars of Independence, and Muirhead served as his chief of staff. In April 1920 Muirhead was appointed to the Deputy Assistant Adjutant and Quartermaster-General's Department of the TF. In December 1924 he returned to the Oxfordshire Hussars, now the 100th (Worcestershire and Oxfordshire Yeomanry) Brigade, Royal Field Artillery, in the part-time Territorial Army, with the regimental rank of major. In 1933 he was promoted Brevet Lieutenant-Colonel and in 1936 to lieutenant-colonel commanding the brigade. In 1938, the brigade became the 53rd (Worcestershire and Oxfordshire Yeomanry) Anti-Tank Regiment, Royal Artillery.

== Political career ==
In the National Government of Prime Minister Neville Chamberlain, he held junior ministerial office as Under-Secretary of State for Air from 1937 to 1938, and as Parliamentary Under-Secretary for India and Burma from 1938 to 1939.

== Death ==
Muirhead died as a result of suicide in 1939, purportedly out of fear that his leg injury would prevent him from seeing active service during the Second World War. He was buried in the churchyard at Great Haseley, Oxfordshire.

Parliament of the United Kingdom
Preceded by Sir Robert Sanders, Bt.	Member of Parliament for Wells; 1929–1939	Succeeded by Dennis Boles
Political offices
Preceded by Sir Philip Sassoon	Under-Secretary of State for Air; 1937–1938	Succeeded by Harold Balfour
Preceded by Lord Stanley	Parliamentary Under-Secretary for India and Burma; 1938–1939	Succeeded by Hugh O'Neill
