= HMS Tradewind =

T-class submarine of the Royal Navy, in service from 1943 to 1955

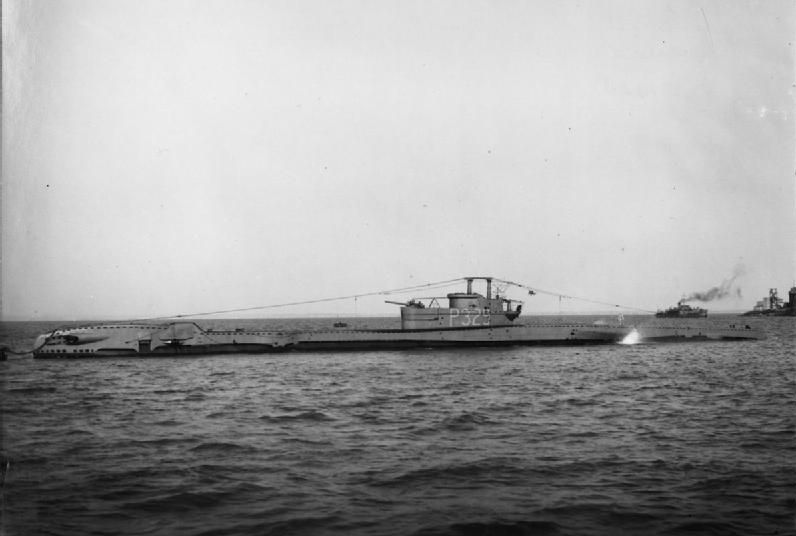
- HMS Tradewind P329

History

United Kingdom
- Name: HMS Tradewind
- Builder: Chatham Dockyard
- Laid down: 11 February 1942
- Launched: 11 December 1942
- Commissioned: 18 October 1943
- Identification: Pennant number P329
- Fate: Scrapped 14 December 1955
- Badge

General characteristics
- Class & type: British T class submarine
- Displacement: 1,290 tons surfaced; 1,560 tons submerged
- Length: 276 ft 6 in (84.28 m)
- Beam: 25 ft 6 in (7.77 m)
- Draught: 12 ft 9 in (3.89 m) forward; 14 ft 7 in (4.45 m) aft
- Propulsion: Two shafts; Twin diesel engines 2,500 hp (1.86 MW) each; Twin electric motors 1,450 hp (1.08 MW) each
- Speed: 15.5 knots (28.7 km/h) surfaced; 9 knots (20 km/h) submerged
- Range: 4,500 nautical miles at 11 knots (8,330 km at 20 km/h) surfaced
- Test depth: 300 ft (91 m) max
- Complement: 61
- Armament: 6 internal forward-facing 21 inch (533 mm) torpedo tubes; 2 external forward-facing torpedo tubes; 2 external amidships rear-facing torpedo tubes; 1 external rear-facing torpedo tubes; 6 reload torpedoes; QF 4 inch (100 mm) deck gun; 3 anti aircraft machine guns

HMS Tradewind was a British submarine of the third group of the T class. She was built as P329 at Chatham, and launched on 11 December 1942. As of 2021 she is the only ship of the Royal Navy to have been named Tradewind, after the trade winds.

== Second World War service ==
She spent most of her wartime career operating against the Japanese in the Far East, attacking enemy shipping and laying mines. She sank nine Japanese sailing vessels, and two small unidentified Japanese vessels, a Japanese tug and the Japanese merchant tanker Takasago Maru. The Japanese merchant cargo vessel Kyokko Maru was sunk after hitting a mine laid by Tradewind.

Her most infamous sinking was of the Japanese army cargo ship Junyō Maru which was headed for Sumatra, on 18 September 1944. Unbeknown to the Commanding Officer of Tradewind, Lt.Cdr. Lynch Maydon, the Japanese ship was carrying 4,200 Javanese slave labourers and 2,300 Allied prisoners of war from Batavia to Padang. 5,620 people died in the sinking.

== Post-war service ==
Tradewind survived the war and was modified in July 1945-September 1946 to become an acoustic trials submarine, and used for tests. The modifications included the removal of external torpedo tubes and guns, the bridge was faired, the hull streamlined and some internal torpedo tubes blanked over. Measurements made using Tradewind were used to overhaul several of the T class boats to increase their ability to act stealthily against Soviet submarines and surface ships.

In 1953 she took part in the Fleet Review to celebrate the Coronation of Queen Elizabeth II. She was scrapped at Charlestown on 14 December 1955.

== Publications ==
- Colledge, J. J.; Warlow, Ben (2006) [1969]. Ships of the Royal Navy: The Complete Record of All Fighting Ships of the Royal Navy from the 15th Century to the Present (3rd Rev ed.). London: Chatham Publishing. ISBN 978-1-86176-281-8. OCLC 67375475.
- Hutchinson, Robert (2001). Jane's Submarines: War Beneath the Waves from 1776 to the Present Day. London: HarperCollins. ISBN 978-0-00-710558-8. OCLC 53783010.
