= Richard Blakemore =

English politician (1775–1855)

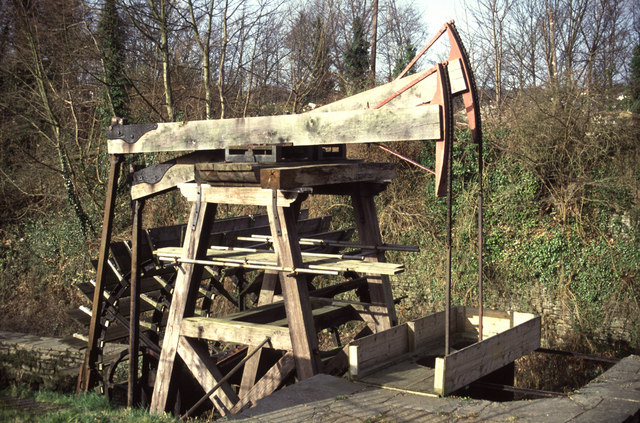
- Melingriffith Tin Plate Works (pump pictured) was owned by Blakemore.
- Born: 8 August 1775; Darlaston, Stafford
- Died: 17 April 1855 (aged 79)
- Occupations: Ironmaster and politician
- Known for: Held seats in southern Wales at The Leys, near Monmouth, and Velindre House, in Whitchurch, Cardiff

Richard Blakemore (8 August 1775 – 17 April 1855), MP was an ironmaster and politician. Born in the West Midlands region of England, he held seats in southern Wales at The Leys, near Monmouth, and Velindre House, in Whitchurch, Cardiff.

== Career ==
Through his uncle, the ironmaster John Partridge, Blakemore became a partner with Harford, Partridge and Company, a notable ironmaster firm in South Wales. He assumed management of the Melingriffith Tin Plate Works in Whitchurch at the end of the 18th century. Eventually, he became sole owner of the works, and was directing its management as late as 1838. He also owned the Pentyrch ironworks. He was a contemporary of the ironmasters Richard Crawshay and Richard Hill.

Blakemore was a magistrate for the counties of Glamorgan, Hereford, Monmouth, and Somerset. He served as a Deputy Lieutenant of Monmouth, Glamorgan, and Hereford. A Conservative, Blakemore represented Wells as a Member of Parliament; he was also the High Sheriff of Glamorgan (1826) and High Sheriff of Herefordshire (1830).

== Personal life ==
Blakemore was born in Darlaston, Stafford, England in 1775. He was the elder son of Thomas Blakemore (d. 1808), of Littleton Hall, West Bromwich and Darlaston. His mother was Anne (d. 1838), daughter of ironmaster John Partridge (1704–1791), of Ross-on-Wye. His mother's three brothers, John (1732–1810), Richard (1736–1778), and William (1739–1820), were all ironmasters; John, of Harford, Partridge and Company, assisted most in Blakemore's ironmaster career. His sister Ann married Rev. Luke Booker, vicar of Dudley, and an author of poetry and other publications. Mary, Esther, and Jane were the other sisters.

Blakemore held seats at The Leys and Velindre House. His other holdings included the Hadnock estate, purchased in 1822, after which he demolished the original house, and used the materials to rebuild and extend The Leys property on the other side of the River Wye. He constructed a trestle-work iron tower, 70 feet (21 m) high, as an observatory at the deer park of The Doward, Whitchurch.

Unmarried, Blakemore adopted his nephew, Thomas William Booker, and raised him at Melingriffith Tin Plate Works. Blakemore is buried at the family tombs located at All Hallows Church, Whitchurch. He was survived by his nephew, T. W. Booker, who added Blakemore to his surname, took over the management of Melingriffith, and became Member of Parliament for Herefordshire.

Parliament of the United Kingdom
Preceded by Nicholas Ridley-Colborne; John Lee Lee	Member of Parliament for Wells; 1837–1852; With: William Goodenough Hayter	Succeeded by Robert Charles Tudway; William Goodenough Hayter
