= Sir William Hayter, 1st Baronet =

British politician

The Right Honourable Sir William Hayter QC

Judge Advocate General
- In office 30 December 1847 – 30 May 1849
- Monarch: Victoria
- Prime Minister: Lord John Russell
- Preceded by: Charles Buller
- Succeeded by: Sir David Dundas

Financial Secretary to the Treasury
- In office 30 May 1849 – 9 July 1850
- Monarch: Victoria
- Prime Minister: Lord John Russell
- Preceded by: John Parker
- Succeeded by: George Cornewall Lewis

Parliamentary Secretary to the Treasury
- In office July 1850 – 21 February 1852
- Monarch: Victoria
- Prime Minister: Lord John Russell
- Preceded by: Henry Tufnell
- Succeeded by: William Forbes Mackenzie
- In office 5 January 1853 – 21 February 1858
- Monarch: Victoria
- Prime Minister: The Earl of Aberdeen; The Viscount Palmerston
- Preceded by: William Forbes Mackenzie
- Succeeded by: Sir William Jolliffe, Bt

Personal details
- Born: 28 January 1792 Winterbourne Stoke, Wiltshire
- Died: 26 December 1878 (aged 86) South Hill Park, Easthampstead, Berkshire
- Party: Whig; Liberal
- Spouse: Anne Pulsford (d. 1889)
- Education: Trinity College, Oxford

Sir William Goodenough Hayter, 1st Baronet, PC, QC (28 January 1792 – 26 December 1878) was a British barrister and Whig politician. He is best remembered for his two tenures as Parliamentary Secretary to the Treasury (government chief whip) between 1850 and 1852 and 1853 and 1858.

== Background and education ==
Born at Winterbourne Stoke, Wiltshire, Hayter was the youngest son of John Hayter and Grace, daughter of Stephen Goodenough, of Codford, Wiltshire. He entered Winchester College in 1804 and matriculated at Trinity College, Oxford, on 24 October 1810, taking his BA in 1814.

== Legal career ==
Hayter was called to the Bar, Lincoln's Inn, on 23 November 1819, and became an equity draftsman and conveyancer. He attended the Wiltshire sessions, but retired from practice on being made a Queen's Counsel on 21 Feb 1839. He was, however, bencher of his inn on 15 April 1839, and treasurer in 1853.

== Political career ==
On 24 July 1837 Hayter was returned to parliament for Wells, and sat for that constituency till 6 July 1865. In 1839 he voted for the repeal of the Corn Laws alongside Charles Pelham Villiers, and was present at all the divisions in favour of free trade. He served under Lord John Russell as Judge Advocate General from 30 December 1847 to 30 May 1849, when he was made Financial Secretary to the Treasury. In July 1850 he was appointed Parliamentary Secretary to the Treasury (chief government whip) by Russell, a post he held until March 1852, and again under Lord Aberdeen and Lord Palmerston from December 1852 to March 1858. The Dictionary of National Biography states that "When Lord Derby came into power in 1852, Hayter marshalled the disorderly ranks of the liberal party with great success, and in the following governments of Lord Aberdeen and Lord Palmerston his powers developed, and his reputation steadily increased".

Hayter was sworn of the Privy Council on 11 February 1848 and created a Baronet, of South Hill Park in the County of Berkshire, on 19 April 1858. Three years later, on 27 February 1861, he was presented by Lord Palmerston and 365 members of the House of Commons with a service of plate at a banquet in Willis's Rooms, according to the Dictionary of National Biography "in remembrance of the courtesy, fairness, and efficiency with which he had discharged his duties for many years as liberal 'whip'".

Hayter was not a frequent speaker in parliament, but took part in debates on matters within his knowledge. He was a member of the committee in Lord Denman's inquiry into the management of the woods and forests, as well as chairman of the committee on Feargus O'Connor's land scheme.

Apart from his political and legal career Hayter was involved in farming. According to the Dictionary of National Biography, "his farm, Lindsay, near Leighton, Buckinghamshire, was kept in the highest state of cultivation, and was a model of economy and profitable management". He was also a member of the council of the Agricultural Society from its start in 1838.

== Family ==
Hayter married Anne, eldest daughter of William Pulsford, of Linslade, Buckinghamshire, on 18 August 1832. During 1878 he fell into a depressed state of mind, and on 26 December was found drowned in a small lake in the grounds of his residence, South Hill Park, Easthampstead, Berkshire, aged 86. He was buried at Easthampstead on 2 January 1879 and was succeeded in the baronetcy by his only son Arthur, who was elevated to the peerage as Baron Haversham in 1906. Lady Hayter died in London on 2 June 1889, aged 82.

Parliament of the United Kingdom
Preceded by John Lee Lee; Nicholas Ridley-Colborne	Member of Parliament for Wells; 1837–1865; With: Richard Blakemore 1837–1852; Robert Tudway 1852–1855; Hedworth Jolliffe 1855–1865	Succeeded by Hedworth Jolliffe; Arthur Hayter
Legal offices
Preceded by Charles Buller	Judge Advocate General; 1847–1849	Succeeded by Sir David Dundas
Political offices
Preceded by John Parker	Financial Secretary to the Treasury; 1849–1850	Succeeded by George Cornewall Lewis
Preceded by Henry Tufnell	Parliamentary Secretary to the Treasury; 1850–1852	Succeeded by William Forbes Mackenzie
Preceded by William Forbes Mackenzie	Parliamentary Secretary to the Treasury; 1853–1858	Succeeded by Sir William Jolliffe, Bt
Baronetage of the United Kingdom
New creation	Baronet (of South Hill Park); 1858–1878	Succeeded by Arthur Divett Hayter
