= Richard Rogers (bishop) =

English priest

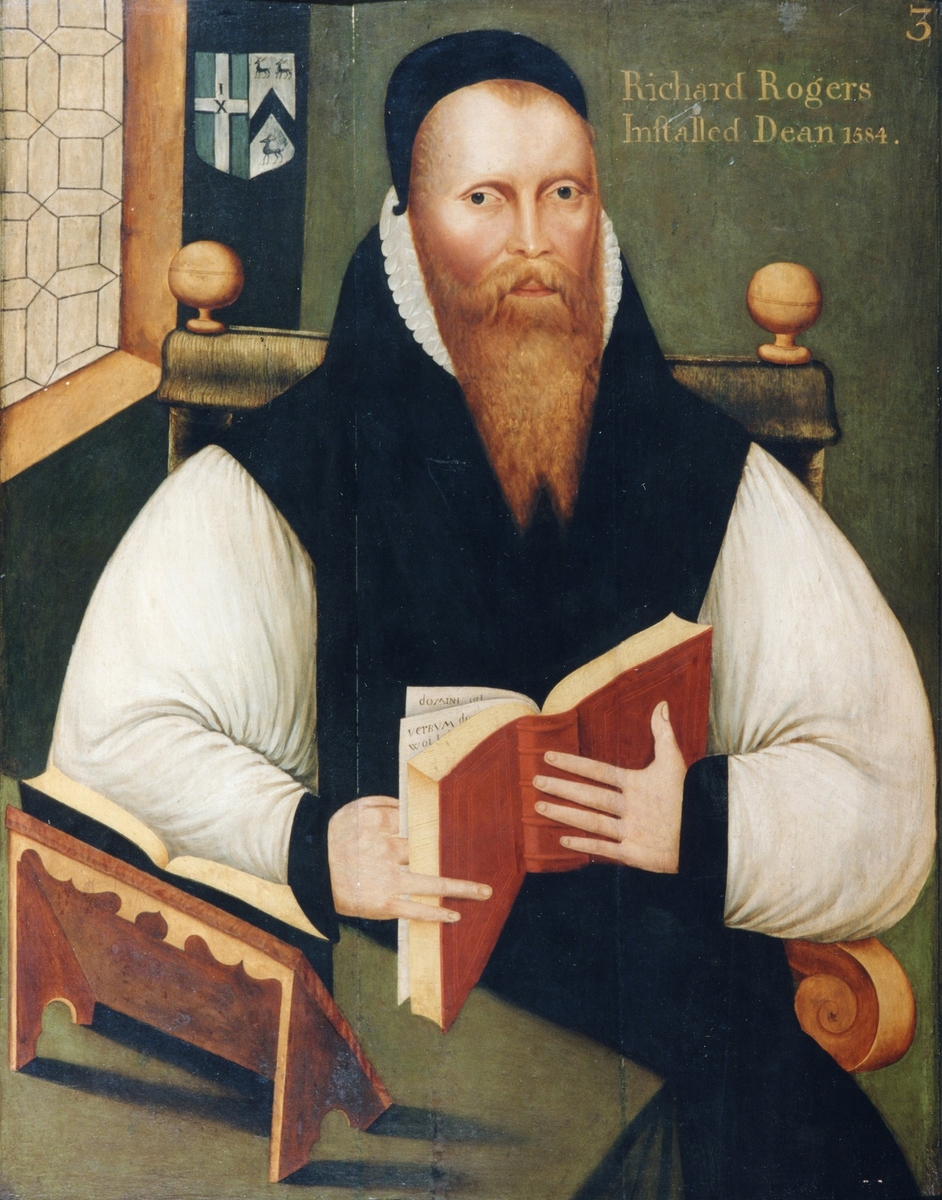
Image of Richard Rogers

Richard Rogers (1532/33 – 1597) was an eminent 16th-century priest who became Suffragan Bishop of Dover.

Richard Rogers was educated at Christ's College, Cambridge. In 1559, Rogers was made archdeacon of St Asaph, and on 15 May 1569 he was consecrated Suffragan Bishop of Dover. After his death no more Suffragan Bishops were appointed until 1870. He was the Dean of Canterbury from 1584 till his death.

== Notes ==
Church of England titles
Preceded by Thomas Godwin	Dean of Canterbury; 1584–1597	Succeeded by Thomas Nevile
