= Jon Goodwin =

Jon Goodwin may refer to:

- Jon Goodwin (canoer)
- Jon Goodwin, a winner of the British quiz show Fifteen to One

== See also ==
- Jonathan Goodwin (disambiguation)
- John Goodwin (disambiguation)
