= Robert Tudway =

British politician

Robert Charles Tudway

Member of Parliament for Wells
- In office 9 July 1852 – 20 October 1855 Serving with William Hayter
- Preceded by: Richard Blakemore; William Hayter
- Succeeded by: Hedworth Jolliffe; William Hayter

Personal details
- Born: 4 July 1808
- Died: 20 October 1855 (aged 47)
- Party: Conservative
- Spouse: Maria Catherine Miles (m. 1846)
- Parent: John Paine Tudway

Robert Charles Tudway (4 July 1808 – 20 October 1855) was a British Conservative politician.

Tudway was the son of former Wells Tory MP John Paine Tudway. In 1846, he married Maria Catherine Miles, daughter of Sir William Miles and Catherine née Gordon, and they had at least one child: Charles Clement Tudway.

Tudway was first elected Conservative MP for Wells at the 1852 general election and held the seat until his death in 1855.

Parliament of the United Kingdom
| Preceded by Richard Blakemore; William Hayter | Member of Parliament for Wells; 1852–1855; With: William Hayter | Succeeded by William Hayter; Hedworth Jolliffe |
