= John Wycombe =

English politician

John Wycombe of Wells, Somerset (fl. 1402), was an English politician.

He was a member (MP) of the parliament of England for Wells in 1402.

Parliament of England
Preceded by ? ?	Member of Parliament for Wells; 1402; With: Roger Chapman	Succeeded by Roger Chapman; Richard Groos
