= Thomas Purfrey =

16th-century English politician

Thomas Purfrey (c. 1556 – c. 1591), of Wells and Banwell, Somerset, was an English politician.

== Family ==
Purfrey was the son of William Purfrey, probably of Hollingbourne, Kent or Shalston, Buckinghamshire. He married Blandina Godwyn, whose mother was Isabel Purfrey. Blandina's father was Thomas Godwyn, bishop of Bath and Wells, and her brother was the Wells MP, Thomas Godwyn. There are no reports of who his heir(s) were.

== Career ==
He was a Member (MP) of the Parliament of England for Wells in 1589.

Parliament of England
Preceded by Thomas Godwyn; William Smith	Member of Parliament for Wells; 1589; With: John Ayshe	Succeeded by Richard Goodwin; James Goodwin
