= Jonathan Goodwin =

Jonathan Goodwin may refer to:

- Jonathan Goodwin (escapologist) (born 1980), British TV escapologist
- Jonathan Goodwin (American football) (born 1978), American football center
- Jonathan Goodwin (entrepreneur) (born 1972), founding partner of Lepe Partners

== See also ==
- John Goodwin (disambiguation)
- Jon Goodwin (disambiguation)
