= Clement Tudway =

British lawyer and politician

Clement Tudway (1734–1815) was a British lawyer and politician who sat in the House of Commons for 54 years from 1761 to 1815, being Father of the House from 1806.

Tudway was the eldest son of Charles Tudway and his wife Hannah. He matriculated at Oriel College, Oxford, in 1751. In 1752 he entered Middle Temple 1752 and was called to the bar in 1759. He married Elizabeth Hill, daughter of Sir Rowland Hill, 1st Baronet, on 7 June 1762. In 1770, he succeeded his father. He became recorder of Wells and was Mayor of Wells ten times.

Tudway was returned unopposed as Member of Parliament for Wells on his father's interest at the 1761 general election. At the 1768 general election there was a contest at Wells, but he topped the poll because his father could command enough votes. He was also returned as MP for Midhurst as a Government candidate at the 1774 general election but decided to sit for Wells where he was returned unopposed. By 1806 he was the longest standing MP in the House, but by this time his absences though ill-health were becoming frequent.

Tudway died while still an MP on 7 July 1815. He and his wife Elizabeth had no children.

Parliament of Great Britain
Preceded by Charles Tudway; Robert Digby	Member of Parliament for Wells; 1761 – 1800; With: Lord Digby 1761–65; Peter Taylor 1765; Robert Child 1766–82; John Curtis 1782–84; William Thomas Beckford 1784–90; Henry Berkeley Portman 1790–96; Charles Taylor from 1790	Succeeded by Parliament of the United Kingdom
Parliament of the United Kingdom
Preceded by Parliament of Great Britain	Member of Parliament for Wells; 1801–1815; With: Charles Taylor	Succeeded by John Paine Tudway; Charles Taylor
Preceded by Sir Philip Stephens, 1st Baronet	Father of the House; 1806-1815	Succeeded by Sir John Aubrey, 6th Baronet
