= 1939 Wells by-election =

UK parliamentary by-election

The 1939 Wells by-election was a parliamentary by-election held for the British House of Commons constituency of Wells in Somerset on 13 December 1939. The seat had become vacant when Anthony Muirhead, the constituency's Conservative Party Member of Parliament had died on 29 October, aged 48. He had held the seat since the 1929 general election. It was viewed as a significant turning point for politics in the local area.

The Conservative candidate, Lt. Colonel Dennis Boles, was returned unopposed.

This was the ninth election since the start of World War II, when unopposed by-elections were common, since the major parties had agreed not to contest by-elections when vacancies arose in seats held by the other parties. Contests occurred only when independent candidates or minor parties chose to stand, and the Common Wealth Party was formed in 1942 with the specific aim of contesting war-time by-elections.

== See also ==
- Wells (UK Parliament constituency)
- The town of Wells
- List of United Kingdom by-elections
