= John Goodwin =

John Goodwin may refer to:

== Politicians ==
- John Goodwin (Parliamentarian) (1603–1674), member of parliament for Reigate
- John B. Goodwin (1850–1921), mayor of Atlanta, Georgia in the late 1880s
- John N. Goodwin (1824–1887), first governor of Arizona Territory and U.S. representative from Maine
- John Goodwin (British Army officer) (1871–1960), British Army officer and governor of Queensland
- John A. Goodwin (1824–1884), American educator, journalist and politician

== Religion ==
- John Goodwin (preacher) (1594–1665), English preacher and religious writer
- John W. Goodwin (1869–1945), general superintendent of the Church of the Nazarene

== Others ==
- Jackie Goodwin (1920–1995), English footballer with Brentford
- J. Cheever Goodwin (1850–1912), American musical theatre librettist, lyricist and producer
- John B. L. Goodwin (1912–1994), American author and poet
- John Goodwin (author) (1878–?), pen name of Sidney Floyd Gowing, novels such as The House of Marney adapted for film
- Jon Goodwin (canoeist) (born 1943), British slalom canoeist
- John Goodwin (footballer) (1887–1954), Scottish footballer with Rangers and Ayr United
- John Goodwin (ice hockey) (born 1961), Emms Family Award winner and coach
- John Goodwin (mason), Boston mason involved in the Salem witch trials
- John Goodwin (theatre publicist) (1921–2018), theatre publicist, writer and editor
- John Magnin Goodwin, songwriter and composer, see Crazy Heart soundtrack
- John Thomas Hill Goodwin (1865–1950), Australian surveyor and public servant

== See also ==
- Jack Godwin (1904–1973), English rowing coxswain and magician
- John Goodwin Lyman (1886–1967), American-born Canadian modernist painter
- John Goodwin Tower (1925–1991), United States senator from Texas
- John Godwin (disambiguation)
- Jon Goodwin (disambiguation)
- Jonathan Goodwin (disambiguation)
