= Wells (constituency) =

Parliamentary constituency in the United Kingdom, 1885–2024

- Former county constituency for the House of Commons
- Boundary of Wells in Somerset

- Location of Somerset within England
- County: Somerset
- Electorate: 79,989 (December 2010)

1918–2024
- Seats: One
- Created from: East Somerset (Majority); Wells (Borough)
- Replaced by: Wells and Mendip Hills; Glastonbury and Somerton; Bridgwater

Wells
- Former borough constituency for the House of Commons

1885–1918
- Seats: One
- Created from: Mid Somerset and East Somerset
- Replaced by: Weston-super-Mare (Majority) and Wells (County)
- Seats: Two

Wells was a constituency (Note: A county constituency (for the purposes of election expenses and type of returning officer)) in Somerset in the House of Commons of the UK Parliament. Apart from between 2010–2015, Wells was represented by members of the Conservative Party since 1924. (Note: As with all constituencies, the constituency elected one Member of Parliament (MP) by the first past the post system of election at least every five years.)

Further to the completion of the 2023 Periodic Review of Westminster constituencies, the seat was abolished, with most of it being transferred to the new constituency of Wells and Mendip Hills, to be first contested at the 2024 general election.

== History ==
The original two-member borough constituency was created in 1295, and abolished by the Reform Act 1867 with effect from the 1868 general election. Its revival saw a more comparable size of electorate across the country and across Somerset, with a large swathe of the county covered by this new seat, under the plans of the third Reform Act and the connected Redistribution of Seats Act 1885 which was enacted the following year.

Political history

The seat was largely Conservative-held during the 20th century and has never elected a Labour MP. The only other political party to have been represented is the Liberal Democrats or their predecessor, the Liberal Party, who achieved a marginal victory in 2010, see marginal seat.

Prominent frontbenchers

Sir William Hayter was chief government whip of the Commons under three Liberal Prime Ministers governing from the Lords, (Lord John) Russell, Aberdeen and Palmerston.

So too in this role was Lord Hylton from 1916 to 1922 alongside the Lord Colebrooke in the Conservative-Liberal National coalition.

Robert Sanders was Deputy Chief Whip in the House of Commons, 1918–1919, and Minister of Agriculture and Fisheries, 1922–1924.

Robert Boscawen was a government whip (1988–1989).

David Heathcoat-Amory was Minister for Europe (1993–1994) and later a Shadow Cabinet member (1997–2001).

== Boundaries ==
Map of boundaries 2010–2024

1885–1918: The Borough of Wells, and the Sessional Divisions of Axbridge and Wells (except the parish of Binegar).

1918–1950: The Boroughs of Glastonbury and Wells, the Urban Districts of Shepton Mallet and Street, the Rural Districts of Shepton Mallet, Wells, and Wincanton, and in the Rural District of Frome the parishes of Cloford, Marston Bigot, Nunney, Wanstrow, Whatley, and Witharn Friary.

1950–1983: The Boroughs of Glastonbury and Wells, the Urban Districts of Frome, Shepton Mallet, and Street, and the Rural Districts of Frome, Shepton Mallet, Wells, and Wincanton.

1983–2010: The District of Mendip wards of Ashwick, Avalon, Chilcompton and Ston Easton, Ebbor, Glastonbury St Benedict's, Glastonbury St Edmund's, Glastonbury St John's, Glastonbury St Mary's, Moor, Nedge, Pylcombe, Rodney, Sheppey, Shepton Mallet, Street North, Street South, Wells Central, Wells St Cuthbert's, and Wells St Thomas, and the District of Sedgemoor wards of Axbridge, Axe Vale, Berrow, Brent, Burnham North, Burnham South, Cheddar, Highbridge, Mark, Shipham, and Wedmore.

2010–2024: The District of Mendip wards of Ashwick and Ston Easton, Avalon, Chilcompton, Glastonbury St Benedict's, Glastonbury St Edmund's, Glastonbury St John's, Glastonbury St Mary's, Knowle, Moor, Nedge, Pylcombe, Rodney and Priddy, St Cuthbert Out North and West, Shepton East, Shepton West, Street North, Street South, Street West, Wells Central, Wells St Cuthbert's, and Wells St Thomas, and the District of Sedgemoor wards of Axbridge, Axe Vale, Berrow, Brent North, Burnham North, Burnham South, Cheddar and Shipham, Highbridge, Knoll, and Wedmore and Mark.

== Constituency profile ==
Aside from energy, transportation, retail, and distribution, agriculture and tourism are important sectors in this part of Central Somerset.

The main settlements include the coastal resort of Burnham-on-Sea, the city of Wells, and contains several natural landmarks such as the Cheddar Gorge and Glastonbury Tor. The site of the Glastonbury Festival also lies within the constituency, which attracts large numbers of visitors every June. The founder of the festival, Michael Eavis, stood as the Labour candidate for the 1997 election, receiving 10,204 votes, Labour's highest total in the seat since 1974.

Workless claimants who were registered jobseekers were in November 2012 significantly lower than the national average of 3.8%, at 2.1% of the population based on a statistical compilation by The Guardian.

== Members of Parliament ==
=== MPs 1295–1640 ===
Parliament	First member	Second member
1386	Nicholas Cristesham	Thomas Phelpes
February 1388	Richard Ferrour	Nicholas Cristesham
September 1388	John Blithe	Thomas Hore
January 1390	Nicholas More	Thomas Tanner
November 1390		
1391	John Newmaster	Roger Chapman
1393	John Newmaster	John Blithe
1394	John Newmaster	Thomas Hore
1395	Nicholas Cristesham	John Comelond
January 1397	Nicholas More	Thomas Wynchester
September 1397	Roger Chapman	William Greynton
1399	Thomas Tanner	John Blithe
1401		
1402	John Wycombe	Roger Chapman
January 1404	Roger Chapman	Richard Groos
October 1404	Walter Dyer	John Bowyer
1406	Thomas Wey	Thomas Jay
1407	Walter Duddesdon	John Newmaster
1410	John Russell	Luke Wilton
1411		
February 1413	John Horewode I	John Podmore
May 1413	John Horewode I	Luke Wilton
April 1414	John Podmore	Thomas Dynt
November 1414	John Hynden	Thomas Dynt
1415		
March 1416		
October 1416	Simon Bailly	John Cutte
1417	Richard Setter	Hildebrand Elwell
1419	Richard Perys	Richard Langford
1420	Richard Setter	Hildebrand Elwell
May 1421	Hildebrand Elwell	Richard Perys
December 1421	Robert Elwell	John Pedewell
1510	John Welshot	John Mawdley I
1512	Walter Sarger	Richard alias Robert Ruynon
1515	Walter Sarger	Richard alias Robert Ruynon
1523	Walter Sarger	John Mawdley I
1529	John Cutte	John Mawdley II
1536	?	
1539	John Mawdley II	John Godwin
1542	John Godwin	James Dyer
1545	John Mawdley II	Anthony Gilbert
1547	Thomas Clerke	John Aylworth
First Parliament of 1553	John Aylworth	William Godwin
Second Parliament of 1553	Thomas Lewis	John Godwin
Parliament of 1554	Thomas Lewis	John Mawdley II
Parliament of 1554–1555	Thomas Lewis	William Gedney or Godwin
Parliament of 1555	Thomas Lewis	Maurice Llewellyn
Parliament of 1558	John Aylworth died during the 1572 Parliament; In his place Ayshton Aylworth	John Mawdley II
Parliament of 1559	John Aylworth died during the 1572 Parliament; In his place Ayshton Aylworth	John Mawdley II
Parliament of 1563–1567	John Aylworth died during the 1572 Parliament; In his place Ayshton Aylworth	John Hippisley
Parliament of 1571	John Aylworth died during the 1572 Parliament; In his place Ayshton Aylworth	Henry Newton
Parliament of 1572–1581	John Aylworth died during the 1572 Parliament; In his place Ayshton Aylworth	William Bowerman
Parliament of 1584–1585	James Bisse	George Upton
Parliament of 1586–1587	Thomas Godwyn	William Smith
Parliament of 1588–1589	Thomas Purfrey	John Ayshe
Parliament of 1593	Richard Goodwin	James Goodwin
Parliament of 1597–1598	Leonard Crosse	William Watkins
Parliament of 1601	James Kirton	George Upton
Parliament of 1604–1611	James Kirton	Sir Robert Stapleton (Edward Forsett)
Addled Parliament (1614)	Sidney Montagu	Thomas Southworth
Parliament of 1621–1622	Sir Edward Rodney	Thomas Southworth
Happy Parliament (1624–1625)	Sir Edward Rodney	Thomas Southworth
Useless Parliament (1625)	Sir Edward Rodney	Sir Thomas Lake
Parliament of 1625–1626	Sir Edward Rodney	Sir Thomas Lake
Parliament of 1628–1629	Sir Ralph Hopton	John Baber
No Parliament summoned 1629–1640

=== MPs 1640–1832 ===
Election	First member	First party	Second member	Second party
April 1640	Sir Edward Rodney	Royalist	John Baber	
November 1640	Sir Edward Rodney	Royalist	Sir Ralph Hopton	Royalist
August 1642	Rodney and Hopton disabled from sitting – both seats vacant			
1645	Lislebone Long	Recruiter	Clement Walker	
December 1648	Lislebone Long	Recruiter	Walker excluded in Pride's Purge – seat vacant	
1653	Wells was unrepresented in the Barebones Parliament			
1654	Lislebone Long		Wells had only one seat in the First and Second Parliaments of the Protectorate	
1656	John Jenkyn		Wells had only one seat in the First and Second Parliaments of the Protectorate	
January 1659	Sir Lislebone Long		Thomas White	
May 1659	Not represented in the restored Rump			
April 1660	Henry Bull		Thomas White	
1661	Sir Maurice Berkeley		Lord Richard Butler	
1673	Sir Maurice Berkeley		John Hall	
1679	Edward Berkeley		William Coward	
1680	John Hall		William Coward	
1685	Edward Berkeley		Thomas Wyndham (died December 1689)	
January 1690	Edward Berkeley		William Coward	
February 1690	Edward Berkeley		Hopton Wyndham	
1695	Edward Berkeley		William Coward	
1701	Henry Seymour Portman		William Coward	
1705	Henry Seymour Portman		Maurice Berkeley	
1708	Edward Colston		William Coward	
1710	Edward Colston		Maurice Berkeley	
1713	Sir Thomas Wroth	Tory	Maurice Berkeley	
1715	Thomas Strangways Horner	Tory	Maurice Berkeley	
May 1716	William Coward		William Piers	Whig
June 1716	Thomas Strangways Horner	Tory	William Piers	Whig
1717	John Dodd	Whig	William Piers	Whig
1719	Thomas Edwards		William Piers	Whig
1722	Thomas Edwards		Francis Gwyn	
1727	Thomas Edwards		Edward Prideaux Gwyn	
1729	Thomas Edwards		William Piers	
1734	Thomas Edwards		George Hamilton	
1735	William Piers		George Speke	
1741	Francis Gwyn		George Speke	
1747	Francis Gwyn		George Hamilton	
1754	Lord Digby		Charles Tudway	
1757	Captain Robert Digby		Charles Tudway	
1761	Lord Digby		Clement Tudway	
1765	Peter Taylor		Clement Tudway	
1766	Robert Child		Clement Tudway	
1782	John Curtis		Clement Tudway	
1784	William Beckford		Clement Tudway	
1790	Henry Berkeley Portman		Clement Tudway	
1796	Sir Charles Taylor	Whig		
1815	Sir Charles Taylor	Whig	John Paine Tudway	Tory
1830	John Edwards-Vaughan	Tory	John Lee Lee	Whig

=== MPs 1832–1868 ===
Election	First member	First party	Second member	Second party
1832	Norman Lamont	Whig	John Lee Lee	Whig
1834 by-election	Nicholas Ridley-Colborne	Whig	John Lee Lee	Whig
1837	Richard Blakemore	Conservative	William Hayter	Whig
1852	Robert Tudway	Conservative	William Hayter	Whig
1855 by-election	Hedworth Jolliffe	Conservative	William Hayter	Whig
1859	Hedworth Jolliffe	Conservative	William Hayter	Liberal
1865	Hedworth Jolliffe	Conservative	Arthur Hayter	Liberal
1868	borough constituency abolished			

=== MPs 1885–1918 ===
Election	Member	Party
1885	Sir Richard Paget, Bt.	Conservative
1895	Hylton Jolliffe	Conservative
1899 by-election	Robert Edmund Dickinson	Conservative
1906	Thomas Ball Silcock	Liberal
January 1910	George Sandys	Conservative
Parliamentary borough abolished, name transferred to a new county division

=== MPs 1918–2024 ===
Election	Member	Party	Notes
1918	Harry Greer	Conservative	Member for Clapham (1918)
1922	Robert Bruford	Conservative	
1923	Arthur Hobhouse	Liberal	
1924	Sir Robert Sanders, Bt.	Conservative	Member for Bridgwater (1910–1923)
1929	Anthony Muirhead	Conservative	Died October 1939
1939 by-election	Lt. Col. Dennis Boles	Conservative	
1951	Lynch Maydon	Conservative	
1970	Robert Boscawen	Conservative	Contested Somerton and Frome following redistribution
Constituency split, with the majority forming the new seat of Somerton and Frome with the minority joining with part of Weston-super-Mare
1983	David Heathcoat-Amory	Conservative	Paymaster General (1994–1996)
2010	Tessa Munt	Liberal Democrats	
2015	James Heappey	Conservative	Minister of State for the Armed Forces (2020–2024)
2024	constituency abolished: see Wells and Mendip Hills		

== Election results 1983–2024 ==
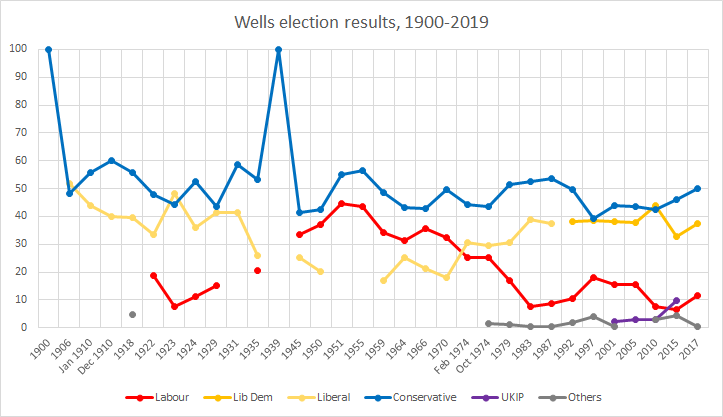
Wells election results

=== Elections in the 2010s ===
General election 2019: Wells
Party	Candidate	Votes	%	±%
Conservative	James Heappey	33,336	54.1	+4.0
Liberal Democrats	Tessa Munt	23,345	37.9	+0.3
Labour	Kama McKenzie	4,304	7.0	−4.7
Independent	Dave Dobbs	373	0.6	New
Motherworld Party	Susie Quatermass	270	0.4	New
Majority		9,991	16.2	+3.7
Turnout		61,628	73.5	−0.4
Conservative hold		Swing	+1.9	

General election 2017: Wells
Party	Candidate	Votes	%	±%
Conservative	James Heappey	30,488	50.1	+4.0
Liberal Democrats	Tessa Munt	22,906	37.6	+4.8
Labour	Andy Merryfield	7,129	11.7	+5.1
CPA	Lorna Corke	320	0.5	New
Majority		7,582	12.5	−0.8
Turnout		60,843	73.95	+2.2
Conservative hold		Swing	-0.5	

General election 2015: Wells
Party	Candidate	Votes	%	±%
Conservative	James Heappey	26,247	46.1	+3.6
Liberal Democrats	Tessa Munt	18,662	32.8	−11.2
UKIP	Helen Hims	5,644	9.9	+6.8
Labour	Chris Inchley	3,780	6.6	−0.9
Green	Jon Cousins	2,331	4.1	+3.0
Independent	Paul Arnold	83	0.1	New
Birthday	Dave Dobbs	81	0.1	New
Independent	Gypsy Watkins	76	0.1	New
Majority		7,585	13.3	N/A
Turnout		56,904	71.7	+1.4
Conservative gain from Liberal Democrats		Swing	+7.4	

General election 2010: Wells
Party	Candidate	Votes	%	±%
Liberal Democrats	Tessa Munt	24,560	44.0	+6.1
Conservative	David Heathcoat-Amory	23,760	42.5	−1.0
Labour	Andy Merryfield	4,198	7.5	−8.1
UKIP	Jake Baynes	1,711	3.1	+0.1
BNP	Richard Boyce	1,004	1.8	New
Green	Chris Briton	631	1.1	New
Majority		800	1.5	N/A
Turnout		55,864	70.3	+2.6
Liberal Democrats gain from Conservative		Swing	+3.6	

=== Elections in the 2000s ===
General election 2005: Wells
Party	Candidate	Votes	%	±%
Conservative	David Heathcoat-Amory	23,071	43.6	−0.2
Liberal Democrats	Tessa Munt	20,031	37.8	−0.5
Labour	Dan Whittle	8,288	15.6	+0.2
UKIP	Steve Reed	1,575	3.0	+0.8
Majority		3,040	5.8	+0.3
Turnout		52,965	68.0	−1.2
Conservative hold		Swing	+0.1	

General election 2001: Wells
Party	Candidate	Votes	%	±%
Conservative	David Heathcoat-Amory	22,462	43.8	+4.4
Liberal Democrats	Graham Oakes	19,666	38.3	−0.2
Labour	Andy Merryfield	7,915	15.4	−2.7
UKIP	Steve Reed	1,104	2.2	New
Wessex Regionalists	Colin Bex	167	0.3	New
Majority		2,796	5.5	+4.6
Turnout		51,314	69.2	−8.6
Conservative hold		Swing		

=== Elections in the 1990s ===
General election 1997: Wells
Party	Candidate	Votes	%	±%
Conservative	David Heathcoat-Amory	22,208	39.4	−10.2
Liberal Democrats	Peter Gold	21,680	38.5	+0.5
Labour	Michael Eavis	10,204	18.1	+7.5
Referendum	Patricia Phelps	2,196	3.9	New
Natural Law	Lynn Royse	92	0.2	New
Majority		528	0.9	−10.7
Turnout		56,380	77.8	−4.9
Conservative hold		Swing		

General election 1992: Wells
Party	Candidate	Votes	%	±%
Conservative	David Heathcoat-Amory	28,620	49.6	−3.9
Liberal Democrats	Humphrey Temperley	21,971	38.0	+0.4
Labour	John Pilgrim	6,126	10.6	+1.9
Green	Mike Fenner	1,042	1.8	New
Majority		6,649	11.6	−4.4
Turnout		57,759	82.7	+3.1
Conservative hold		Swing	−2.2	

=== Elections in the 1980s ===
General election 1987: Wells
Party	Candidate	Votes	%	±%
Conservative	David Heathcoat-Amory	28,624	53.5	+0.9
Liberal	Alan Butt-Philip	20,083	37.6	−1.4
Labour	Peter James	4,637	8.7	+0.9
Independent	John Fish	134	0.3	New
Majority		8,541	16.0	+2.4
Turnout		53,478	79.6	+2.0
Conservative hold		Swing	+1.3	

General election 1983: Wells
Party	Candidate	Votes	%	±%
Conservative	David Heathcoat-Amory	25,385	52.6	–0.5
Liberal	Alan Butt-Philip	18,810	39.0	+12.8
Labour	Andrew Leigh	3,747	7.8	–12.3
Independent	G. Livings	273	0.6	–0.1
Majority		6,575	13.6	–
Turnout		48,215	77.6	
Registered electors		62,159		
Conservative hold		Swing	–6.6	

1979 notional result
Party	Vote	%
Conservative	23,587	53.1
Liberal	11,652	26.2
Labour	8,898	20.0
Others	267	0.6
Turnout	44,404	
Electorate		

== Election results 1918–1983 ==
=== Elections in the 1970s ===
General election 1979: Wells
Party	Candidate	Votes	%	±%
Conservative	Robert Boscawen	30,400	51.35	
Liberal	Alan Butt-Philip	18,204	30.75	
Labour	Paul Murphy	10,025	16.93	
Independent	G. Livings	421	0.71	New
Wessex Regionalists	Viscount Weymouth	155	0.26	New
Majority		12,196	20.60	+6.59
Turnout		59,205	79.24	
Conservative hold		Swing		

General election October 1974: Wells
Party	Candidate	Votes	%	±%
Conservative	Robert Boscawen	23,979	43.64	
Liberal	Alan Butt-Philip	16,278	29.63	
Labour	G. Mortimer	13,909	25.31	
United Democratic Party	P. Howard	778	1.42	New
Majority		7,701	14.01	
Turnout		54,944	78.88	
Conservative hold		Swing		

General election February 1974: Wells
Party	Candidate	Votes	%	±%
Conservative	Robert Boscawen	25,430	44.25	
Liberal	Alan Butt-Philip	17,645	30.70	
Labour	D.K. Pearce	14,399	25.05	
Majority		7,785	13.55	
Turnout		57,474	83.29	
Conservative hold		Swing		

General election 1970: Wells
Party	Candidate	Votes	%	±%
Conservative	Robert Boscawen	25,106	49.6	+6.6
Labour	Frank R. Thompson	16,335	32.3	−3.3
Liberal	William Fedde J Pinching	9,174	18.1	−3.3
Majority		8,771	17.3	+9.9
Turnout		50,615	77.4	−4.1
Conservative hold		Swing		

=== Elections in the 1960s ===
General election 1966: Wells
Party	Candidate	Votes	%	±%
Conservative	Lynch Maydon	20,528	43.0	−0.2
Labour	John G Cousins	16,989	35.6	+4.1
Liberal	Howard Fry	10,224	21.4	−3.9
Majority		3,539	7.4	−4.3
Turnout		47,741	81.5	−0.9
Conservative hold		Swing		

General election 1964: Wells
Party	Candidate	Votes	%	±%
Conservative	Lynch Maydon	20,663	43.2	−5.4
Labour	Reginald George White	15,080	31.5	−2.7
Liberal	Howard Fry	12,132	25.3	+8.2
Majority		5,583	11.7	−2.7
Turnout		47,875	82.4	−1.2
Conservative hold		Swing		

=== Elections in the 1950s ===
General election 1959: Wells
Party	Candidate	Votes	%	±%
Conservative	Lynch Maydon	23,357	48.6	−7.8
Labour	Jon Antony A Evans	16,452	34.2	−9.3
Liberal	Paul R Hobhouse	8,220	17.1	New
Majority		6,905	14.4	+1.5
Turnout		48,029	83.6	+4.1
Conservative hold		Swing		

General election 1955: Wells
Party	Candidate	Votes	%	±%
Conservative	Lynch Maydon	25,624	56.4	+1.2
Labour	Maxwell Bresler	19,745	43.5	−1.3
Majority		5,879	12.9	+2.5
Turnout		45,369	79.5	−4.7
Conservative hold		Swing		

General election 1951: Wells
Party	Candidate	Votes	%	±%
Conservative	Lynch Maydon	26,524	55.2	+12.6
Labour	David Llewellyn	21,481	44.8	+7.6
Majority		5,043	10.4	+5.0
Turnout		48,005	84.2	−3.6
Conservative hold		Swing		

General election 1950: Wells
Party	Candidate	Votes	%
Conservative	Dennis Boles	20,613	42.6
Labour	Dorothy Archibald	17,987	37.2
Liberal	Anthony Marreco	9,771	20.2
Majority		2,626	5.4
Turnout		48,371	87.8
Conservative win (new boundaries)			

=== Election in the 1940s ===
General election 1945: Wells
Party	Candidate	Votes	%	±%
Conservative	Dennis Boles	13,004	41.3	−12.1
Labour	Cyril Morgan	10,539	33.5	+13.0
Liberal	Violet Bonham Carter	7,910	25.2	−0.9
Majority		2,465	7.8	−19.5
Turnout		31,453	75.0	+1.3
Conservative hold		Swing		

=== Elections in the 1930s ===
1939 Wells by-election
Party	Candidate	Votes	%	±%
Conservative	Dennis Boles	Unopposed	N/A	N/A
Conservative hold				

General Election 1939–40: Another general election was required to take place before the end of 1940. The political parties had been making preparations for an election to take place and by the Autumn of 1939, the following candidates had been selected;

- Conservative: Anthony Muirhead
- Liberal: James A Brown
- Labour:

General election 1935: Wells
Party	Candidate	Votes	%	±%
Conservative	Anthony Muirhead	14,898	53.4	−5.3
Liberal	Arnold Hilward Jones	7,277	26.1	−15.2
Labour	William James Waring	5,716	20.5	New
Majority		7,621	27.3	+9.9
Turnout		27,891	73.7	−13.8
Conservative hold		Swing		

General election 1931: Wells
Party	Candidate	Votes	%	±%
Conservative	Anthony Muirhead	17,711	58.7	+15.1
Liberal	John Thompson	12,440	41.3	−0.1
Majority		5,271	17.4	+15.2
Turnout		30,151	87.5	+5.0
Conservative hold		Swing		

=== Elections in the 1920s ===
Arthur Hobhouse

General election 1929: Wells
Party	Candidate	Votes	%	±%
Unionist	Anthony Muirhead	13,026	43.6	−9.0
Liberal	Arthur Hobhouse	12,382	41.4	+5.3
Labour	Ruby Davies	4,472	15.0	+3.7
Majority		644	2.2	−14.3
Turnout		29,880	82.5	+0.3
Unionist hold		Swing	-7.2	

General election 1924: Wells
Party	Candidate	Votes	%	±%
Unionist	Robert Sanders	12,642	52.6	+8.4
Liberal	Arthur Hobhouse	8,668	36.1	+11.9
Labour	Wilfred Thomas Young	2,726	11.3	+3.7
Majority		3,974	16.5	N/A
Turnout		24,036	82.2	+3.1
Unionist gain from Liberal		Swing		

General election 6 December 1923: Wells
Party	Candidate	Votes	%	±%
Liberal	Arthur Hobhouse	10,818	48.2	+14.8
Unionist	Robert Bruford	9,909	44.2	−3.5
Labour	Charles Henry Whitlow	1,713	7.6	−11.3
Majority		909	4.0	N/A
Turnout		22,440	79.1	+1.3
Liberal gain from Unionist		Swing	+9.1	

General election 1922: Wells
Party	Candidate	Votes	%	±%
Unionist	Robert Bruford	10,210	47.7	−8.1
Liberal	Arthur Hobhouse	7,156	33.4	−6.2
Labour	Len Smith	4,048	18.9	New
Majority		3,054	14.3	−1.9
Turnout		21,414	77.8	+12.8
Unionist hold		Swing		

=== Elections in the 1910s ===
General election 1918: Wells
Party		Candidate	Votes	%
C	Unionist	Harry Greer	9,786	55.8
	Liberal	John Coleby Morland	6,935	39.6
	National	G.C.S. Hodgson	804	4.6
Majority			2,851	16.2
Turnout			17,525	65.0
Registered electors			26,951	
	Unionist win (new seat)			
C indicates candidate endorsed by the coalition government.

== Election results 1885–1918 ==
=== Elections in the 1880s ===
General election 1885: Wells
Party	Candidate	Votes	%
Conservative	Richard Paget	4,200	55.7
Liberal	Pandeli Ralli	3,335	44.3
Majority		865	11.4
Turnout		7,535	79.3
Registered electors		9,501	
Conservative win (new seat)			

General election 1886: Wells
Party	Candidate	Votes	%	±%
Conservative	Richard Paget	Unopposed		
Conservative hold				

=== Elections in the 1890s ===
General election 1892: Wells
Party	Candidate	Votes	%	±%
Conservative	Richard Paget	4,335	56.1	N/A
Liberal	Beaumont Morice	3,395	43.9	New
Majority		940	12.2	N/A
Turnout		7,730	75.6	N/A
Registered electors		10,230		
Conservative hold		Swing	N/A	

General election 1895: Wells
Party	Candidate	Votes	%	±%
Conservative	Hylton Jolliffe	4,696	58.8	+2.7
Liberal	Beaumont Morice	3,286	41.2	−2.7
Majority		1,410	17.6	+5.4
Turnout		7,982	74.1	−1.5
Registered electors		10,771		
Conservative hold		Swing	−5.4	

Joliffe's elevation to the peerage, becoming Lord Hylton, caused a by-election.

By-election, 7 Dec 1899: Wells
Party	Candidate	Votes	%	±%
Conservative	Robert Edmund Dickinson	Unopposed		
Conservative hold				

=== Elections in the 1900s ===
General election 1900: Wells
Party	Candidate	Votes	%	±%
Conservative	Robert Edmund Dickinson	Unopposed		
Conservative hold				

Silcock

General election 1906: Wells
Party	Candidate	Votes	%	±%
Liberal	Thomas Ball Silcock	5,146	51.9	New
Conservative	Robert Edmund Dickinson	4,761	48.1	N/A
Majority		385	3.8	N/A
Turnout		9,907	84.5	N/A
Registered electors		11,725		
Liberal gain from Conservative		Swing	N/A	

=== Elections in the 1910s ===
General election January 1910: Wells
Party	Candidate	Votes	%	±%
Conservative	George Sandys	6,167	55.9	+7.8
Liberal	Thomas Ball Silcock	4,871	44.1	−7.8
Majority		1,296	11.8	N/A
Turnout		11,038	87.3	+2.8
Registered electors		12,642		
Conservative gain from Liberal		Swing	+7.8	

General election December 1910: Wells
Party	Candidate	Votes	%	±%
Conservative	George Sandys	6,178	60.1	+4.2
Liberal	Arthur Lane Wills	4,094	39.9	−4.2
Majority		2,084	20.2	+8.4
Turnout		10,272	81.3	−6.0
Registered electors		12,642		
Conservative hold		Swing	+4.2	

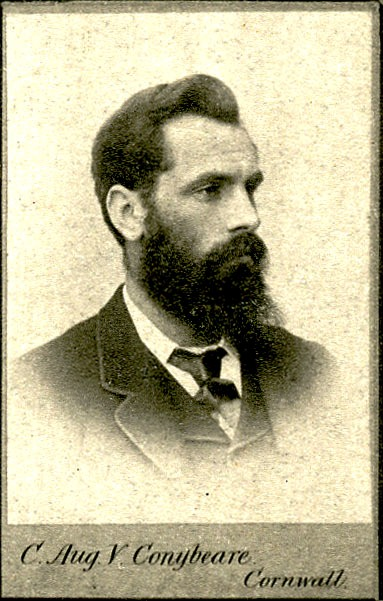

General Election 1914–15:

Another General Election was required to take place before the end of 1915. The political parties had been making preparations for an election to take place and by July 1914, the following candidates had been selected;

- Unionist: George Sandys
- Liberal: Charles Conybeare

== Election results 1832–1868 ==
=== Elections in the 1830s ===
General election 1832: Wells
Party	Candidate	Votes	%
Whig	Norman Lamont (MP for Wells)	169	30.2
Whig	John Lee Lee	167	29.9
Whig	Nicholas Ridley-Colborne	164	29.3
Tory	John Edwards-Vaughan	59	10.6
Majority		3	0.6
Turnout		318	94.1
Registered electors		338	
Whig hold			
Whig gain from Tory			

- Edwards-Vaughan resigned on the first day of polling

Lamont's death caused a by-election.

By-election, 5 May 1834: Wells
Party	Candidate	Votes	%
Whig	Nicholas Ridley-Colborne	Unopposed	
Whig hold			

General election 1835: Wells
Party	Candidate	Votes	%
Whig	Nicholas Ridley-Colborne	Unopposed	
Whig	John Lee Lee	Unopposed	
Registered electors		377	
Whig hold			
Whig hold			

General election 1837: Wells
Party	Candidate	Votes	%
Conservative	Richard Blakemore	Unopposed	
Whig	William Hayter	Unopposed	
Registered electors		402	
Conservative gain from Whig			
Whig hold			

=== Elections in the 1840s ===
General election 1841: Wells
Party	Candidate	Votes	%	±%
Conservative	Richard Blakemore	Unopposed		
Whig	William Hayter	Unopposed		
Registered electors		346		
Conservative hold				
Whig hold				

General election 1847: Wells
Party	Candidate	Votes	%	±%
Conservative	Richard Blakemore	Unopposed		
Whig	William Hayter	Unopposed		
Registered electors		375		
Conservative hold				
Whig hold				

Hayter was appointed Judge Advocate General of the Armed Forces, requiring a by-election.

By-election, 27 December 1847: Wells
Party	Candidate	Votes	%	±%
Whig	William Hayter	Unopposed		
Whig hold				

=== Elections in the 1850s ===
General election 1852: Wells
Party	Candidate	Votes	%	±%
Conservative	Robert Tudway	187	40.4	N/A
Whig	William Hayter	175	37.8	N/A
Radical	John Alexander Kinglake	101	21.8	N/A
Turnout		232 (est)	71.2 (est)	N/A
Registered electors		325		
Majority		12	2.6	N/A
Conservative hold		Swing	N/A	
Majority		74	16.0	N/A
Whig hold		Swing	N/A	

Tudway's death caused a by-election.

By-election, 21 November 1855: Wells
Party	Candidate	Votes	%	±%
Conservative	Hedworth Jolliffe	146	54.7	+14.3
Radical	John Alexander Kinglake	121	45.3	+23.5
Majority		25	9.4	+6.8
Turnout		267	70.3	−0.9
Registered electors		380		
Conservative hold		Swing	−4.6	

General election 1857: Wells
Party	Candidate	Votes	%	±%
Whig	William Hayter	Unopposed		
Conservative	Hedworth Jolliffe	Unopposed		
Registered electors		343		
Whig hold				
Conservative hold				

General election 1859: Wells
Party	Candidate	Votes	%	±%
Liberal	William Hayter	Unopposed		
Conservative	Hedworth Jolliffe	Unopposed		
Registered electors		327		
Liberal hold				
Conservative hold				

=== Elections in the 1860s ===
General election 1865: Wells
Party	Candidate	Votes	%	±%
Liberal	Arthur Hayter	Unopposed		
Conservative	Hedworth Jolliffe	Unopposed		
Registered electors		274		
Liberal hold				
Conservative hold				

== Elections before 1832 ==
=== Elections in the 1830s ===
General election 1830: Wells
Party	Candidate	Votes	%	±%
Tory	John Edwards-Vaughan	196	38.0	
Whig	John Lee Lee	195	37.8	
Tory	Richard Blakemore	125	24.2	
Turnout		308	c. 88.0	
Registered electors		c. 350		
Majority		1	0.2	
Tory hold		Swing		
Majority		70	13.6	
Whig hold		Swing		

General election 1831: Wells
Party	Candidate	Votes	%
Tory	John Edwards-Vaughan	Unopposed	
Whig	John Lee Lee	Unopposed	
Registered electors		c. 350	
Tory hold			
Whig hold			

== See also ==
- List of parliamentary constituencies in Somerset

== Sources ==
- Craig, F. W. S. (1983) [1969]. British parliamentary election results 1918–1949 (3rd ed.). Chichester: Parliamentary Research Services. ISBN 0-900178-06-X.
- D Brunton & D H Pennington, Members of the Long Parliament (London: George Allen & Unwin, 1954)
- Cobbett's Parliamentary history of England, from the Norman Conquest in 1066 to the year 1803 (London: Thomas Hansard, 1808) titles A-Z
- Henry Stooks Smith, The Parliaments of England from 1715 to 1847, Volume 2 (London: Simpkin, Marshall & Co, 1845) The Parliaments of England: From 1st George I., to the Present Time
