= Goodwyn =

Goodwyn is an English surname and given name.

== People ==
=== Given name ===
- Goodwyn Barmby (1820–1881), British Victorian utopian socialist

=== Surname ===
- Albert Taylor Goodwyn (1842–1931), U.S. Representative from Alabama
- Alfred Goodwyn (1850–1874), English Royal Engineer who represented his regiment at football
- Charles Wyndham Goodwyn, British philatelist, Keeper of the Royal Philatelic Collection 1995–2003
- Myles Goodwyn (born 1948), Canadian record producer, guitarist, lead vocalist, main songwriter and founding member of April Wine
- Peterson Goodwyn (1745–1818), soldier, politician and planter from Virginia
- S. Bernard Goodwyn, Justice on the Supreme Court of Virginia

== Fictional characters ==
- Dorie Goodwyn, a.k.a. Doremi Harukaze, the title character of the anime series Ojamajo Doremi
- Caitlyn Goodwyn, a.k.a. Pop Harukaze, Doremi/Dorie's younger sister and a supporting character in Ojamajo Doremi

== See also ==
- Goodwyn A, an Australian gas production platform, part of the North West Shelf Project
- Goodwyns, a housing estate in Dorking, England
