= Edward Berkeley (died 1707) =

English politician

Edward Berkeley (c. 1644 – 1707) was an English politician.

He was the son of Edward Berkeley of Pylle, Somerset and educated at Wadham College, Oxford and Lincoln's Inn (1665).

He was the Member of Parliament for Wells, Somerset from 1679 to 1701.

He married Elizabeth, the daughter and coheiress of John Ryves of Ranston, Dorset and had 3 sons (1 of whom predeceased him) and 3 daughters.
