= John Pedewell =

English politician

John Pedewell of Wells, Somerset, was an English politician.

== Family ==
Pedewell was probably the son of William Pedewell of Wells, Somerset. John Pedewell married a woman named Agnes. They had two sons, whose names are unrecorded.

== Career ==
He was a member (MP) of the parliament of England for Wells in December 1421 and 1426.
