= Walter Sarger =

16th-century English politician

Walter Sarger (by 1488 – 1535) of Wells, Somerset, was an English politician.

He was a member (MP) of the parliament of England for Wells in 1512, 1515 and 1523.
