= Richard alias Robert Ruynon =

16th-century English politician

Richard alias Robert Ruynon or Reynion (by 1478 – 1521?) of Shepton Mallet and Wells, Somerset, was an English politician.

He was a member (MP) of the parliament of England for Wells in 1512 and 1515.
