= John Horewode (MP for Chipping Wycombe) =

English politician

John Horewode (fl. 1421) was an English politician.

He was a member (MP) of the parliament of England for Chipping Wycombe in December 1421.
