= Richard Godwyn =

16th-century English politician

Richard Godwyn (died 1601) of Wells, Somerset, was an English politician, a Member of the Parliament of England for Wells in 1593.

Parliament of England
Preceded by Thomas Purfrey; John Ayshe	Member of Parliament for Wells; 1593; With: James Goodwin	Succeeded by Leonard Crosse; William Watkins
