= John Hippisley (1530–1570) =

English barrister and politician

John Hippisley (1530–1570) was an English barrister and politician.

== Life ==
Born in Ston Easton, Somerset, he was the son of John Hippisley and Agnes Aleyn. His father had acquired the manor of Ston Easton (major) from the Crown in 1544, for £500; John inherited the manor on his father’s death in 1558.

John became a senior lawyer at the Middle Temple in London and was described by Dr Hubert Hall in his social study Society in the Elizabethan Age as "perhaps the most successful country practitioner of his time".

He made a contribution towards the cost of building the Middle Temple Hall, and the expressions of gratitude from the Masters of the Bench suggest that he gave a considerable sum.

John represented Wells as Member of Parliament between 1562 and 1566 after briefly serving as MP for Bridport and was also Recorder of Bristol – the City's senior Judge – from 1551 until his death. In 1559 he bought the manor of Whitnell, where his grandfather had been tenant and bailiff, and in 1561 he bought the manor of Cameley and built Cameley Court.

With his mother Agnes still living in the manor house at Ston Easton, and managing the estate there, John seems to have preferred to live at Cameley, and is described as being "of Cameley" in the 1623 Visitation of Somersetshire.

In 1564 John obtained a coat of arms, and in 1570 he bought the manor of Emborough.

John's career was cut short when he died, aged just 40, on 12 August 1570. He was buried in Cameley nine days later and was succeeded by his son, also called John.
