= Thomas Tanner (MP) =

English politician

Thomas Tanner (died 1401) of Wells, Somerset, was an English politician.

He was a member (MP) of the parliament of England for Wells in April 1384, January 1390 and 1399.
