= Thomas Lewis (Wells politician) =

English politician

Thomas Lewis (fl. 1528–1559), of Wells, Somerset was an English politician.

He was a member (MP) of the parliament of England for Wells in October 1553, April 1554, November 1554 and 1555.
