= Aylworth =

Village in Gloucestershire, England

Coordinates: 51.89°N 01.85°W

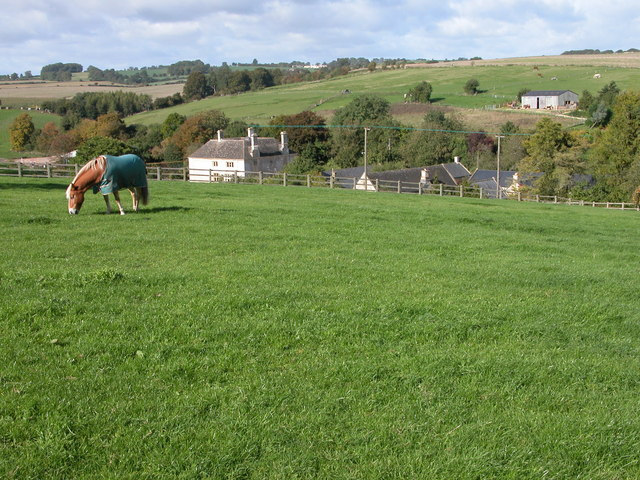
- A view of Aylworth from the south east

- Location within Gloucestershire
- OS grid reference: SP1022
- Shire county: Gloucestershire
- Region: South West
- Country: England
- Sovereign state: United Kingdom
- Police: Gloucestershire
- Fire: Gloucestershire
- Ambulance: South Western

Aylworth is a village in Gloucestershire, England.
