= John Horewode (MP for Wells) =

English politician

John Horewode (died 1417) of Wells, Somerset, was an English politician.

He was a member (MP) of the parliament of England for Wells in February and May 1413.

He married Margery and they had one son, Thomas, also an MP.
