= John Podmore =

English politician

John Podmore (fl. 1413–1414) was an English politician.

== Family ==
Podmore was the son of John and Joan Podmore. It is unclear if he had any connection to the town of Wells, Somerset other than being elected its MP.

== Career ==
He was a member (MP) of the parliament of England for Wells in February 1413 and April 1414.
