= James Godwyn =

English politician

James Godwyn (c. 1557 – 1616), of Wells, Somerset, was an English politician.

He was a member (MP) of the parliament of England for Wells in 1593. He was Mayor of Wells in 1593–94 and 1613–14.

Parliament of England
Preceded by Thomas Purfrey; John Ayshe	Member of Parliament for Wells; 1593; With: Richard Goodwin	Succeeded by Leonard Crosse; William Watkins
