= Jun'yō Maru =

Cargo steamship that became a Japanese hell ship

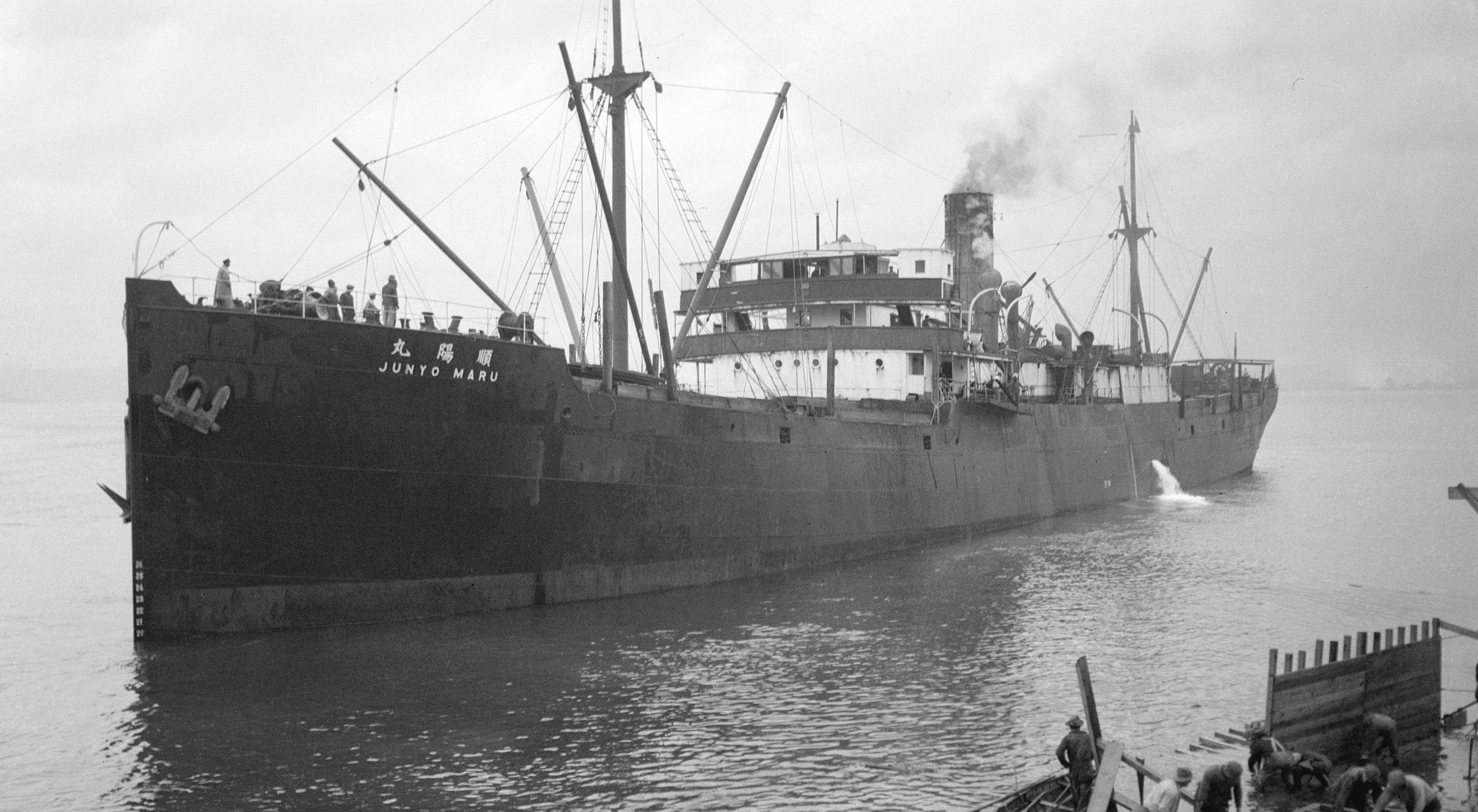
- Jun'yō Maru in 1933

History
- Name: 1913: Ardgorm; 1917: Hartland Point; 1918: Hartmore; 1921: Sureway; 1927: Junyo Maru; 1938: Zyunyo Maru
- Namesake: 1917: Hartland Point
- Owner: 1913: SS Ardgorm Co; 1917: Norfolk & N American SS Co; 1918: Johnston Line; 1921: Anglo-Oriental Nav Co; 1927: Sanyo ShaGoshi K; 1928: Kabafuto Kisen KK; 1938: Baba Shoji KK
- Operator: 1913: Lang & Fulton; 1917: Furness, Withy & Co; 1921: Yule, Catto & Co
- Port of registry: 1913: (United Kingdom of Great Britain and Ireland) Greenock; 1919: (United Kingdom of Great Britain and Ireland) Liverpool; 1927: (Empire of Japan) Takasago; 1928: (Empire of Japan) Tokyo
- Builder: Robert Duncan & Co, Port Glasgow
- Yard number: 324
- Launched: 30 October 1913
- Identification: 1913: UK official number 135334; code letters JDPQ; 1927: code letters THSV; 1934: call sign JKLB
- Fate: Torpedoed and sunk near Sumatra, 18 September 1944

General characteristics
- Type: cargo steamship
- Tonnage: 5,131 GRT, 3,287 NRT
- Length: 405.0 ft (123.4 m)
- Beam: 53.0 ft (16.2 m)
- Depth: 27.2 ft (8.3 m)
- Decks: 2
- Installed power: 1 × triple-expansion engine; 475 NHP
- Propulsion: 1 × screw

Jun'yō Maru (順陽丸) was a cargo steamship that was built in Scotland in 1913, served a succession of British owners until 1927, and was then in Japanese ownership until a Royal Navy submarine sank her in 1944 in Indonesian (then Dutch colonial) waters. It is the largest maritime disaster in Dutch maritime history.

The ship was built as Ardgorm for a Scottish tramp shipping company. In 1917 a subsidiary of Furness, Withy & Co bought her and renamed her Hartland Point. In 1918, she was transferred to a different Furness, Withy subsidiary and renamed Hartmore. In 1921, the Anglo-Oriental Navigation Company bought her and renamed her Sureway.

In 1927, Japanese owners bought the ship and renamed her Junyo Maru. In 1938, the registered spelling of name became Zyunyo Maru. The name's modern rendition into the Latin alphabet is Jun'yō Maru.

In 1944, Jun'yō Maru was being used as a hell ship, carrying about 4,200 Javanese slave labourers and about 2,300 Allied prisoners of war (PoWs) when the submarine HMS Tradewind sank her. More than 5,000 men were killed. This is one of the highest death tolls of any maritime disaster in World War II, and one of the highest death tolls of any ship sunk by submarine.

== Building and first owner ==
Robert Duncan & Co built the ship at Port Glasgow as yard number 324, launching her on 30 October 1913. Her registered length was 405.0 ft (123.4 m), her beam was 53.0 ft (16.2 m) and her depth was 27.2 ft (8.3 m). Her tonnages were 5,131 gross register tons (GRT) and 3,287 net register tons (NRT). She had a single screw, driven by a three-cylinder triple-expansion steam engine that was built by John G. Kincaid & Company of Greenock, and rated at 475 NHP.

The ship's first managers were Lang & Fulton Ltd, a Scottish firm who operated a small number of tramp steamships, to each of which they gave a name beginning with "Ard–". They named their new ship Ardmore and registered her at Greenock. Her UK official number was 135334 and her code letters were JDPQ.

== Changes of owner ==
In 1917 Furness, Withy bought two ships from Lang & Fulton: Ardglen, which was still being built, and Ardgorm, which Furness, Withy renamed Hartland Point, registered in Liverpool, and allocated to its Norfolk & North American Steamship Company subsidiary. In 1918 Furness, Withy transferred Hartland Point to its Johnston Line subsidiary and renamed her Hartmore. Also by 1919, the ship was equipped for wireless telegraphy.

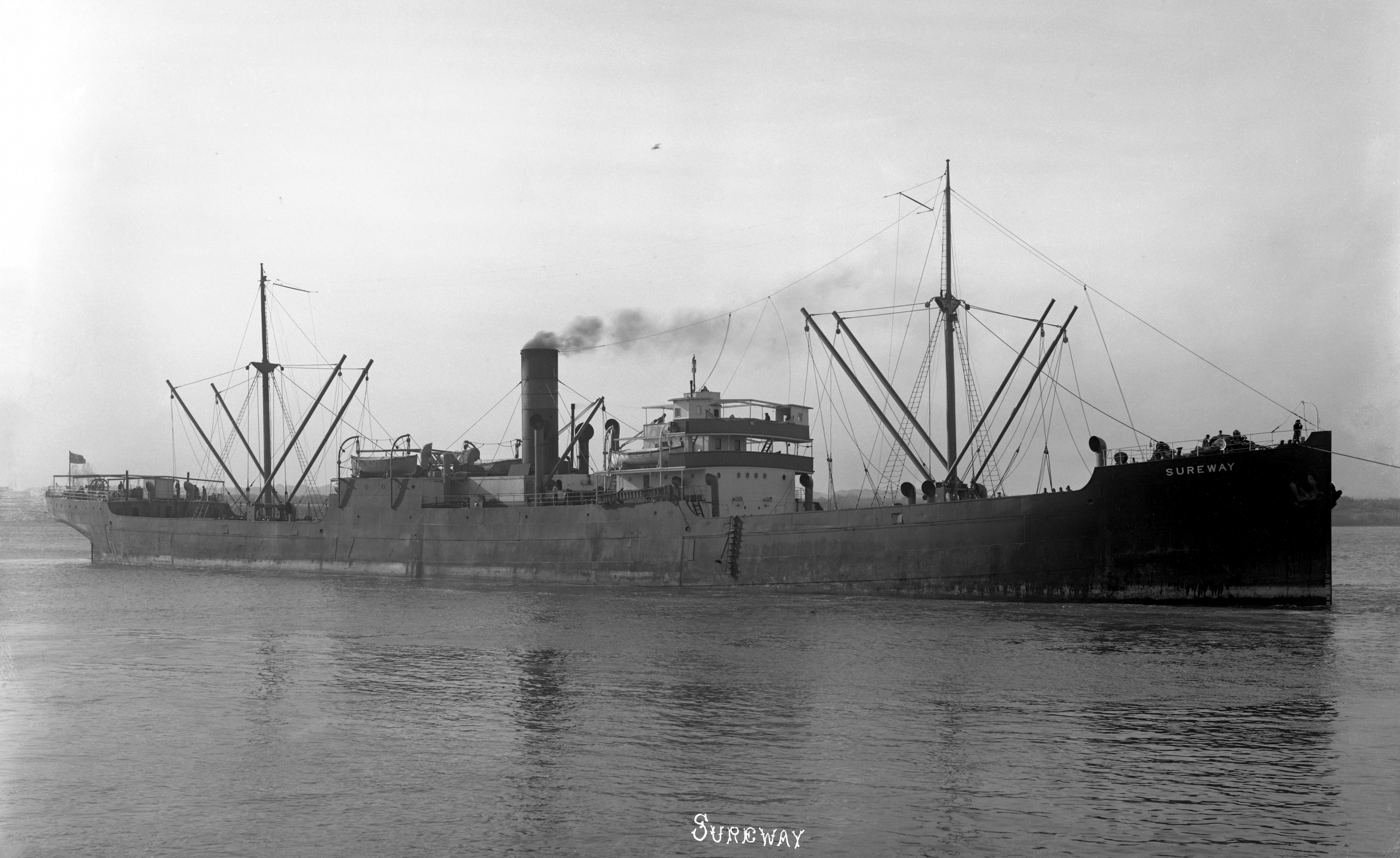
The ship as Sureway in the 1920s, probably in the Scheldt

In 1921, the Anglo-Oriental Navigation Company bought Hartmore, renamed her Sureway, and made Yule, Catto & Co her managers.

In 1927, Sanyo ShaGoshi Kaisha bought the ship, renamed her Junyo Maru, and registered her in Takasago. Her Japanese code letters were THSV. By 1928 Sanyo ShaGoshi Kaisha had sold her on to Kabafuto Kisen KK, who registered her in Tokyo.

By 1934, her call sign was JKLB. In 1938 Baba Shoji KK acquired her and her registered name became Zyunyo Maru. The name's modern rendition into the Latin alphabet is Jun'yō Maru.

== Hell ship ==
By September 1944, Jun'yō Maru had been fitted out as a prison ship with bamboo scaffolding between her decks and bunks three or four deep in her holds. She had almost no latrines, too little drinking water, only two lifeboats and very few liferafts.

She embarked about 4,200 or 4,300 Javanese forced labourers (rōmushas) and an estimated 2,200 to 2,300 Allied PoWs at the port of Tanjung Priok on Java near Batavia, to take them to Pekanbaru to build a railway across Sumatra. The PoWs included at least 1,700 Dutch, 506 Indonesians and 14 Americans.

The rōmushas were crammed into holds one and two, forward of the main superstructure amidships. The Allied PoWs were herded into holds three and four, aft of the superstructure. Some prisoners were left on deck. Many were already ill with malnutrition and dysentery before they embarked. Some died, others became delirious.

On 16 September, Jun'yō Maru left Tanjung Priok for Sumatra. She traversed the Sunda Strait and passed the island of Krakatoa. On 17 September, was heading for Padang, escorted by a small Imperial Japanese Navy ship that survivors described as a corvette or gunboat. By 18 September, she had two naval escorts, one on each quarter, which HMS Tradewind's crew described as motor launches.

== Sinking ==
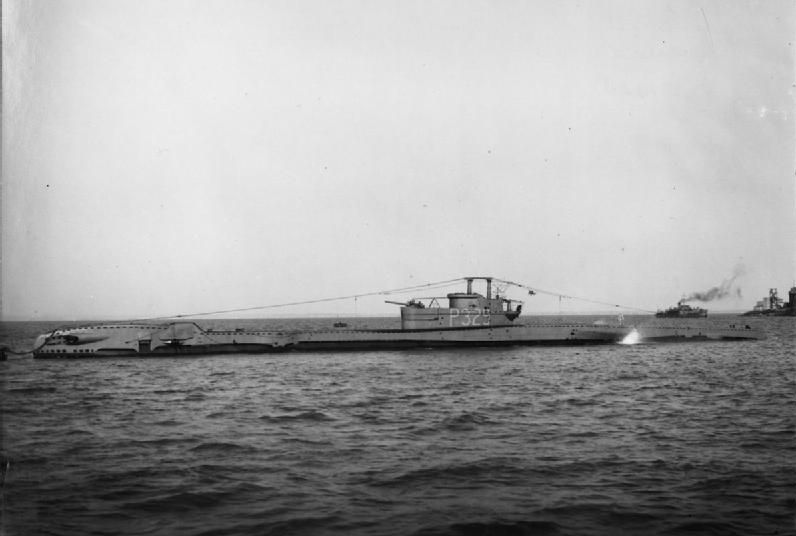
HMS Tradewind, which sank Jun'yō Maru

Jun'yō Maru was making a defensive zigzag course, but one of her turns placed her abeam of the submerged Tradewind. At about 1600 hrs on 18 September, Tradewind fired a spread of four torpedoes from a range of about 1,800 yards (1,600 m). Two hit Jun'yō Maru, one in her forward holds and the other aft. One escort vessel retaliated by dropping three depth charges, while the other rescued Japanese survivors. Tradewind dived deep and escaped damage. Jun'yō Maru sank by her stern in about 15 minutes at position 2°53′S 101°11′E.

Jun'yō Maru's Japanese crew launched one of her lifeboats, but it was holed and quickly swamped. Its occupants used an axe to repel PoWs in the water who tried to reach the boat. Rōmushas and PoWs in Jun'yō Maru's holds had difficulty getting up on deck to abandon ship. The senior British PoW, Lieutenant Commander H.C. Upton RNVR, organised PoWs to launch the liferafts and throw overboard any dunnage that might provide buoyancy for survivors in the water. Many rōmushas and PoWs either went down with the ship or drowned as they floated in the ocean.

The next morning, one of the Japanese escort vessels returned and rescued 680 surviving prisoners. They were taken to Pekanbaru, where they were put to work building the railway. A compiled list of names puts the number of allied POW deaths at around 1,449. It is unknown exactly how many rōmushas were killed, but most estimates are between 4,000 and 4,100.

== See also ==
- List of Japanese hell ships
- Cap Arcona and Thielbek – German prison ships sunk when transporting between 7,000 and 8,000 deportees.

== Bibliography ==
- Burrell, David (1992). Furness Withy 1891–1991. Kendal: World Ship Society. ISBN 0-905617-70-3.
- Lloyd's Register of Shipping. Vol. II.—Steamers. London: Lloyd's Register of Shipping. 1914 – via Internet Archive.
- Lloyd's Register of Shipping. Vol. II.—Steamers. London: Lloyd's Register of Shipping. 1919 – via Internet Archive.
- Lloyd's Register of Shipping. Vol. II.—Steamers and Motor Vessels. London: Lloyd's Register of Shipping. 1922 – via Internet Archive.
- Lloyd's Register of Shipping. Vol. II.—Steamers and Motorships. London: Lloyd's Register of Shipping. 1927 – via Internet Archive.
- Lloyd's Register of Shipping (PDF). Vol. II.–Steamers and Motorships of 300 Tons Gross and Over. London: Lloyd's Register of Shipping. 1934 – via Southampton City Council.
- Lloyd's Register of Shipping (PDF). Vol. II.–Steamers and Motorships of 300 Tons. Trawlers, Tugs, Dredgers, Etc. London: Lloyd's Register of Shipping. 1939 – via Southampton City Council.
- Mercantile Navy List. London: Registrar General of Shipping and Seamen. 1914 – via Crew List Index Project.
- Mercantile Navy List. London: Registrar General of Shipping and Seamen. 1918 – via Crew List Index Project.
- Mercantile Navy List. London: Registrar General of Shipping and Seamen. 1920 – via Crew List Index Project.
- Mercantile Navy List. London: Registrar General of Shipping and Seamen. 1923 – via Crew List Index Project.
