= John Blithe (MP) =

English politician

John Blithe (died 1410) of Wells, Somerset, was an English politician.

== Family ==
He married Christine Plomer. After Blithe's death, she married another Wells MP, Richard Setter.

== Career ==
He was a member (MP) of the parliament of England for Wells in 1388, 1393 and 1399.
