= William Godwin (MP) =

16th-century English politician

William Godwin (by 1520 – 1557), of Wells, Somerset, was an English politician.

== Family ==
Godwin's family were from Wells. He had four sons and four daughters.

== Career ==
He was a member (MP) of the parliament of England for Wells in March 1553 and November 1554.
