= Thomas Hore =

Member of the Parliament of England

Thomas Hore (died 1406) was an English MP for Wells, Somerset September 1388 and 1394.
