= Hildebrand Elwell =

English politician

Hildebrand Elwell (fl. 1417–1431) of Wells, Somerset, was an English politician.

== Family ==
He was the brother of Wells MP, Robert Elwell. Hildebrand married a widow.

== Career ==
He was a member (MP) of the parliament of England for Wells in 1417, 1420, May 1421 and 1431.
