= Luke Wilton =

English politician

Luke Wilton (fl. 1410–1413), of Wells, Somerset, was an English politician.

== Family ==
Wilton married Agnes, the widow of another MP for Wells, Richard Groos.

== Career ==
He was a Member (MP) of the Parliament of England for Wells in 1410 and May 1413.
