= Richard Perys =

English politician

Richard Perys (fl. 1419–1421) of Wells, Somerset, was an English politician.

== Family ==
Perys married a widow, whose name is unrecorded.

== Career ==
He was a member (MP) of the parliament of England for Wells in 1419 and May 1421.
