= Nicholas More (MP) =

English politician

Nicholas More (fl. 1390–1397) of Wells, Somerset, was an English politician.

He was a member (MP) of the parliament of England for Wells in January 1390 and January 1397.
