= John Godwin (by 1507 – 1556 or later) =

English politician

John Godwin (by 1507 – 1556 or later) of Wells, Somerset, was an English politician.

He was a Member (MP) of the Parliament of England for Wells in 1539 and October 1553.
