= John Mawdley (died 1540) =

16th-century English politician

John Mawdley or Maudelyn (by 1467 – 9 August 1540) of Wells, Somerset, was an English politician.

== Family ==
Mawdley married a woman named Joan, whose maiden name may have been Attwater. They had at least two sons, one of which, John Mawdley, was an MP for Wells, and one daughter.

== Career ==
He was a member (MP) of the parliament of England for Wells in 1510 and 1523.
