= Richard Setter =

English politician

Richard Setter alias Milers (before 1390 – 1422) was an English politician.

== Family ==
In 1410, he married Christine Plomer, the widow of another Wells MP, John Blithe.

== Career ==
He was a member (MP) of the parliament of England for Wells in 1417, 1420 and 1422.
