= James Kirton (MP for Wells) =

English politician

James Kirton (died 1611), of London and West Camel, Somerset, was an English politician.

He was born the 2nd son of Robert Kirton (d. c.1565) of Wells, Somerset and educated at New Inn and the Middle Temple (1585), where he was called to the bar in 1596. He was Recorder of Wells from 1601 to 1610.

He was a member (MP) of the parliament of England for Wells in 1601 and 1604.

He died by February 1611. He had married in 1599, Elizabeth, the daughter of Sir John Rodney of Pilton and Rodney Stoke, Somerset, with whom he had 3 sons and 2 daughters.
