= Ashton Aylworth =

16th-century English politician

Ashton Aylworth (died by 1602), of St. Andrew's, Holborn, London, was an English politician.

Aylworth was the eldest son of the MP, John Aylworth and the brother of the MP, Edward Aylworth. Ashton married Anne Fleetwood of The Vache, Buckinghamshire and they had at least one daughter.

He was a member (MP) of the parliament of England for Launceston in 1563 and for Wells in 1572.
