= Nicholas Cristesham =

14th-century English politician

Nicholas Cristesham (died c. 1403), of Wells, Somerset, was an English politician.

== Family ==
Cristesham was the son of John Cristesham. He seems to have spent his life in Wells. Nicholas married a woman named Maud.

== Career ==
He was a Member (MP) of the Parliament of England for Wells in 1366, 1372, 1373, January 1377, October 1377, 1378, January 1380, 1381, October 1383, April 1384, 1386, February 1388 and 1395.
