= Thomas Godwyn (MP) =

16th-century English politician

Thomas Godwyn (before 1561 – after 1586), of Banwell, Somerset, was an English politician.

== Family ==
Godwyn was the eldest son of Thomas Godwyn, bishop of Bath and Wells and Isabel Purfrey, the daughter of Nicholas Purfrey of Shelston, Buckinghamshire. He married twice: Frances, who died in 1588 and Margaret Bowerman of Wells, Somerset. In 1589, his sister's husband, Thomas Purfrey, represented Wells.

== Career ==
He was a Member (MP) of the Parliament of England for Wells in 1586.
