= John Aylworth =

16th-century English politician

John Aylworth (by 1516 – 28 December 1575), of Wells, Somerset, Dartington, Devon and Bangor Place, Holborn, London, was an English politician.

Aylworth was probably the second son of Anthony Aylworth of Aylworth, Gloucestershire. Aylworth married Elizabeth Ashton, and they had six sons and one daughter. Two of their sons, Ashton and Edward, became Members of Parliament.

He was a Member (MP) of the Parliament of England for Wells in 1547, 1553, 1558, 1559, 1563, 1571, 1572 and for Penryn in October 1553.
