= John Newmaster =

English politician

John Newmaster (fl. 1391–1407) of Wells, Somerset, was an English politician.

He was a member (MP) of the parliament of England for Wells in 1391, 1393, 1394 and 1407.
