= Roger Chapman (MP) =

English politician

Roger Chapman or Chepman (fl. 1391–1404) was an English politician.

He was a member (MP) of the parliament of England for Wells in 1391, September 1397, 1402 and January 1404.
