= Walter Dyer (MP) =

English politician

Walter Dyer (died c. 1423), of Wells, Somerset, was an English politician.

He was a member (MP) of the parliament of England for Wells in October 1404 and 1406.
