= John Mawdley (died 1572) =

English politician

John Mawdley (by 1501 – 6 April 1572), of the Middle Temple, London and Wells, Somerset, was an English politician.

== Family ==
Mawdley was the eldest son of Wells MP, John Mawdley.

== Career ==
He was a member (MP) of the parliament of England for Wells in 1529, 1539, 1545, April 1554, 1558 and 1559.
