= George Upton (died 1609) =

English politician

George Upton (1553–1609) was an English politician.

== Biography ==
He was the son of Geoffrey Upton, deputy receiver to the Bishop of Bath and Wells, of Trelaske, Cornwall and Warminster, Wiltshire.

He was a member (MP) of the parliament of England for Wells in 1584 and 1601, and for Bossiney in 1604.

He married twice but left no children.
