= Henry Goodwin =

Henry Goodwin may refer to:

- Henry B. Goodwin (1878–1931), Swedish photographer of German descent
- Henry C. Goodwin (1824–1860), U.S. Representative from New York
- Henry Martyn Goodwin (1820–1893), American minister
- Henry Goodwin (musician) (1910–1979), American jazz musician

== See also ==
- Henry O. Godwinn, American professional wrestler
- Harry Goodwin (disambiguation)
- Henry Godwin (disambiguation)
- Henry Goodwin Smith (1860–1940), American theologian
