= Conrad Janis =

American actor and musician (1928–2022)

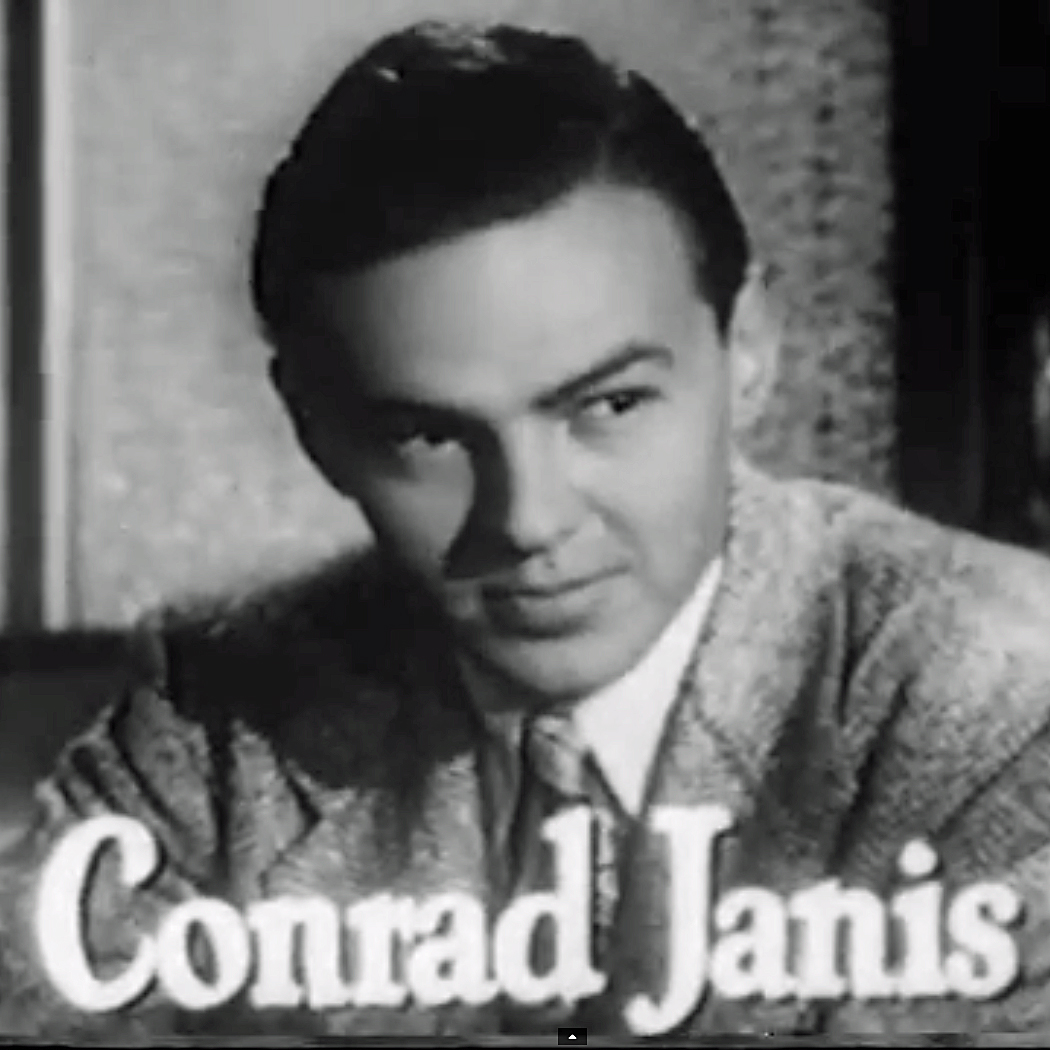
- In the trailer for The Brasher Doubloon (1947)
- Born: February 11, 1928; New York City, U.S.
- Died: March 1, 2022 (aged 94); Los Angeles, California, U.S.
- Occupations: Actor; trombonist
- Years active: 1945–2012
- Spouses: Vicki Quarles (m. 1948; div. 1957) Ronda Copland (m. 1979; div. 1983) Maria Grimm (m. 1987; died 2021)
- Children: 2

Conrad Janis (February 11, 1928 – March 1, 2022) was an American jazz trombonist and actor who starred in film and television during the Golden Age Era in the 1950s and 1960s, and continued acting until 2012. He played the role of Mindy McConnell's father Frederick in 53 episodes of Mork & Mindy, and appeared in many guest-starring roles on several notable television shows throughout the 1970s, 1980s, and 1990s, such as the sitcoms Maude, The Golden Girls, and Frasier. He competed in a NASCAR Grand National Series race in 1954, finishing 39th at the Linden Airport. Janis was part of an amateur sports car group and competed under the false name J. Christopher in the race to maintain his amateur status.

== Early life ==
Janis was born in Manhattan on February 11, 1928. His father, Sidney, was an art dealer and writer; his mother, Harriet (Grossman), was also a writer. He had one brother, Carroll. Janis successfully auditioned as an actor for a road company at the age of 13 and consequently spent the next two years with them. He also began doing radio voice work during this time.

== Career ==
=== Film and television ===
Janis secured a role in the play Dark of the Moon during its pre-Broadway run, in which he was spotted by a Hollywood talent scout. He stayed with the production when it ran in New York City, consequently making his Broadway debut in March 1945. He then made his film debut later that year as Ronald Stevens in the film Snafu. Next Janis played Johnikins in Margie (1946) with Jeanne Crain. He starred in the film noir The Brasher Doubloon with George Montgomery the following year.

Janis's work on television included starring in "Fit to Kill" on The Web on November 19, 1950. He played the eldest son Edward on the sitcom Bonino in 1953. He subsequently appeared in an episode of Get Smart as a KAOS agent, guest-starred as a dance marathon emcee on The Golden Girls, and appeared in the sci-fi sitcoms Quark and Mork & Mindy. He was also featured in The Buddy Holly Story and the Goldie Hawn / George Segal comedy The Duchess and the Dirtwater Fox. Janis made a brief appearance as himself in the jazz bar scene of Nothing in Common.

=== Music ===
Janis was a longtime advocate of traditional jazz. He assembled a band of jazz musicians in 1949 ("all of the guys that I idolized"), consisting of James P. Johnson (piano), Henry Goodwin (trumpet), Edmond Hall (clarinet), Pops Foster (bass), and Baby Dodds (drums), with himself on trombone. During the late 1970s, he formed the Beverly Hills Unlisted Jazz Band, which appeared multiple times on the The Tonight Show Starring Johnny Carson and gave eight sold-out performances at Carnegie Hall.

== Personal life and death ==
Janis's first marriage was to Vicki Quarles. Together, they had two children, Christopher and Carin. They later divorced. His second marriage to Ronda Copland also ended in divorce. Janis married his third wife, Maria Grimm, in 1987. They remained married until her death in September 2021.

Janis died on March 1, 2022, aged 94, in Los Angeles. His death was announced by his business manager Dean A. Avedon, who was also the executor of his estate.

== Partial filmography ==
Year	Title	Role	Notes
1945	Snafu	Ronald Stevens	Alternative title: Welcome Home
1946	Margie	Johnny 'Johnikins' Green	
1947	The Brasher Doubloon	Leslie Murdock	Alternative title: The High Window
1947	That Hagen Girl	Dewey Koons	
1948	Beyond Glory	Raymond Denmore, Jr.	
1958	Let's Rock	Charlie	Alternative title: Keep It Cool
1965	Get Smart	Victor	(Season 1, Episode 12)
1966	My Favorite Martian	Chad Foster	TV or Not TV (Season 3, Episode 19)
1972	Banacek	Video Technician	Let's Hear it for a Living Legend (Season 1 Episode 1)
1974	Airport 1975	Arnie	
1974	Cannon	Larry Warshaw	Daddy's Little Girl
1975	The Happy Hooker	Fred	
1976	Happy Days	Mr. Kendall	(Season 4, Episode 7)
1976	The Duchess and the Dirtwater Fox	Gladstone	
1976	Maude	Lyle Bellamy (Game Show Host)	(Season 5, Episode 8)
1977	Roseland	George	
1977–1978	Quark	Otto Bob Palindrome	8 episodes
1978–1982	Mork & Mindy	Frederick Fred McConnell	53 episodes
1978	The Buddy Holly Story	Ross Turner	
1980	Oh, God! Book II	Charles Benson	
1985	V: The Series	Dr. David Atkins	Episode: "War of Illusions"
1985	Brewster's Millions	Businessman in Car	
1985	Highway to Heaven	C.J. Barabbas	Episode: "The Devil and Jonathan Smith"
1986	Nothing in Common	Conrad Janis and the Unlisted Jazz Band	
1987	The Golden Girls	Dance Marathon Emcee	(Season 3, Episode 2)
1988	Murder She Wrote	Miles Hatcher	(Season 5, Episode 2 'A Little Night Work')
1989	Caddie Woodlawn	Rev. Tanner	
1989	Sonny Boy	Doc Bender	
1992	Mr. Saturday Night	Director	
1995	The Feminine Touch	Frank Donaldsonn	Also director; alternative title: The November Conspiracy
1996	The Cable Guy	Father 'Double Trouble'	
1997–2002	Frasier	Albert	3 episodes
2009	Maneater	Doc Gramm	
2012	Bad Blood	Lawrence	Also director
