= Harry Goodwin (disambiguation) =

Harry Goodwin was a British photographer.

Harry Goodwin may also refer to:

- Harry Goodwin (cricketer) (1870–1955), cricketer for Gloucestershire
- Harry Goodwin, candidate in Leek
- Harry Goodwin (footballer) (1903–1989), Scottish footballer
- Harry Goodwin (bowls) (born 1997), English lawn and indoor bowler

== See also ==
- Henry Goodwin (disambiguation)
- Harold Goodwin (disambiguation)
- Harry Godwin (1901–1985), English botanist and ecologist
