= Crowne Plaza Liverpool John Lennon Airport Hotel =

Hotel in Liverpool, England

Crowne Plaza Liverpool-John Lennon Airport
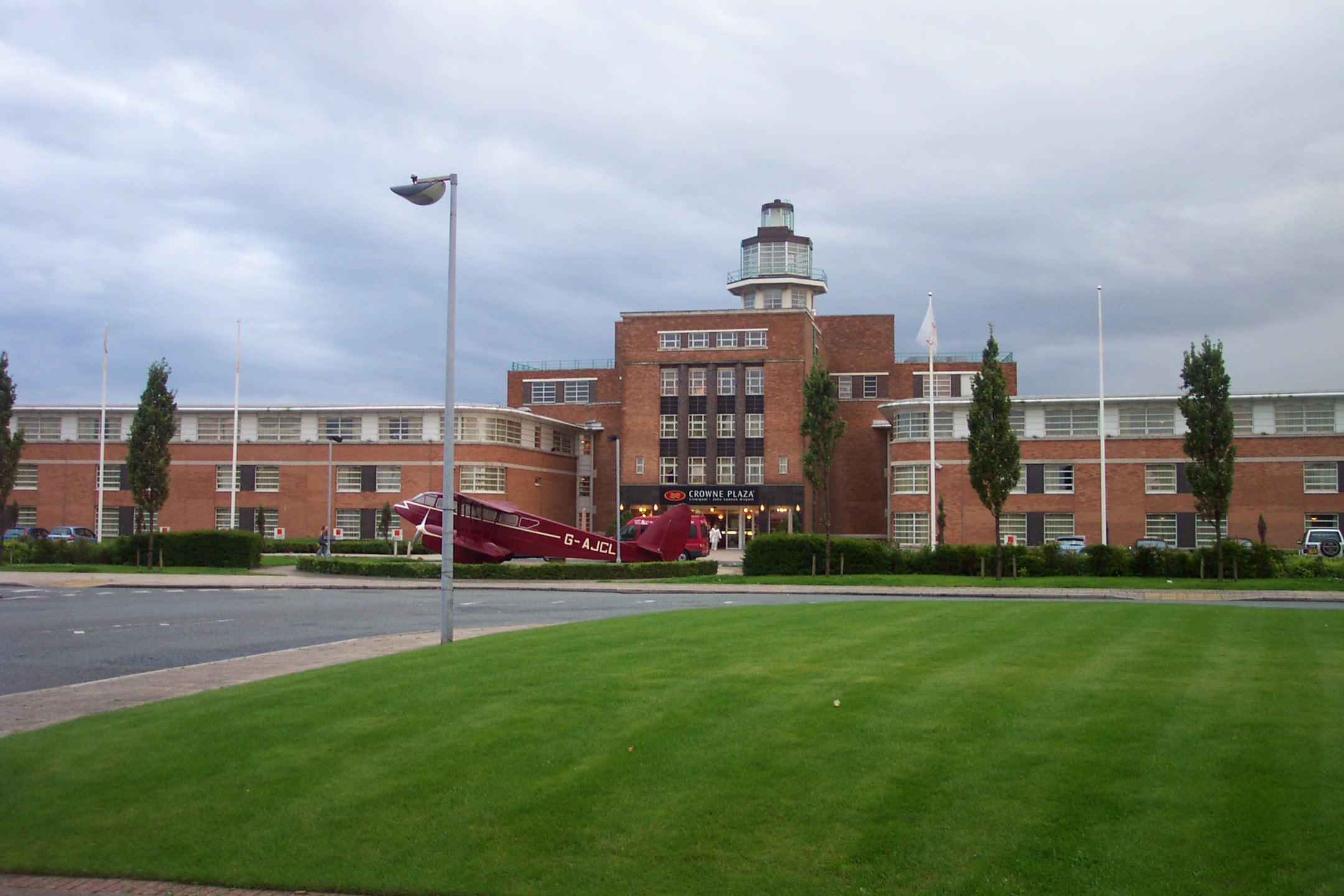
- Interactive map of the Crowne Plaza Liverpool-John Lennon Airport area

General information
- Location: Liverpool, Merseyside
- Coordinates: 53.347721°N 2.880639°W
- Opening: 14 May 2001
- Owner: Unknown
- Operator: Crowne Plaza (InterContinental Hotels Group

Technical details
- Floor count: 3 floors

Other information
- Number of rooms: 164
- Number of suites: 1

Website
- Official website

The Crowne Plaza Liverpool John Lennon Airport Hotel, formerly the Marriott Liverpool South Hotel, is an airport hotel near to Liverpool John Lennon Airport, serving the English city of Liverpool. Today a member of the Crowne Plaza chain owned by the InterContinental Hotels Group, the Grade II* listed Art Deco hotel building has an unusual history.

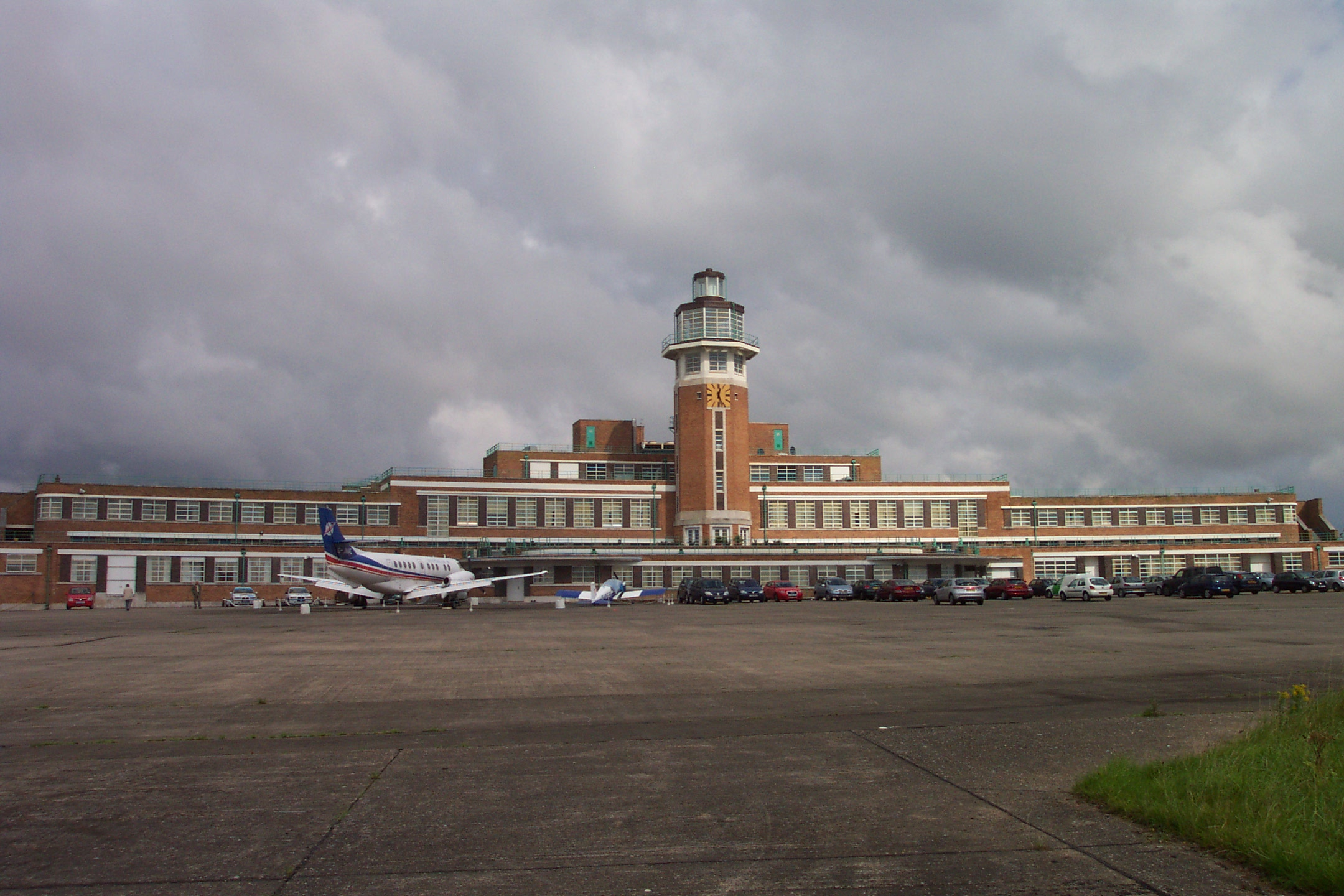
The hotel from the former airside. The preserved Jetstream can be seen, as can the famous terraces.

The building was constructed in the 1930s, as the terminal building for the airport, then known as Speke Aerodrome. It is still sometimes seen on early television news footage, with its terraces packed with fans waiting to greet the Beatles on their return from tour. The airport terminal was moved to a more modern building at Liverpool John Lennon Airport in 1986, and the original building was left derelict for over a decade. During this time, the building was featured on the cover art of the single "Don't Go Away", by Oasis. However it has since been renovated and adapted to become a hotel, opening for business in 2001. The adaption involved adding two new bedroom wings on the frontage of the hotel, but the airside aspect has been preserved intact.

The former apron of the terminal is also listed and retained in its original condition, although it is no longer connected to the airport or subject to airside access control. It is the home of several aircraft, including BAe Jetstream 41 prototype G-JMAC, Hawker Siddeley HS 748 G-BEJD, Bristol Britannia 308F G-ANCF and Percival Prince G-AMLZ, preserved by the Speke Aerodrome Heritage Group. Additionally, the group looks after a replica de Havilland Dragon Rapide that is displayed in front of the hotel entrance.

The two art deco style hangars that flank the terminal and apron have also been converted for new uses. One is now a leisure centre, whilst the other has been adapted as the headquarters of The Very Group, and is now known as Skyways House.
