= Henry Godwin =

Henry Godwin may refer to:

- Henry Godwin (Army officer) (1784–1853), Major-General of the Bombay Army
- Henry Haversham Godwin-Austen (1834–1923), English geologist
- Henry O. Godwinn (born 1964), ring name of wrestler Mark Canterbury
- Harry Godwin (1901–1985), botanist
- Henry Thomas Godwin (1853–?), Ontario farmer and political figure

== See also ==
- Henry Goodwin (disambiguation)
