= Harold Goodwin =

Harold Goodwin may refer to:

- Harold Goodwin (professor) (born 1952), professor at Manchester Metropolitan University
- Harold Goodwin (cricketer) (1886–1917), English cricketer at Cambridge University and Warwickshire
- Harold Goodwin (American actor) (1902–1987)
- Harold Goodwin (English actor) (1917–2004)
- Harold L. Goodwin (1914–1990), American writer
- Harold Goodwin (American football) (born 1973), offensive line coach

== See also ==
- Harry Goodwin (disambiguation)
- Goodwin (surname)
- Harold Godwin (ca. 1022–1066), king of England
- Harry Godwin (1901–1985), English botanist and ecologist
