= Harry Goodwin =

British photographer (1924–2013)

- Born: 21 July 1924; Fallowfield, Manchester, England
- Died: 23 September 2013 (aged 89); Trafford General Hospital, Davyhulme, Manchester
- Occupation: Photographer
- Years active: 1940s–2013

Harry Goodwin (21 July 1924 – 23 September 2013) was a British photographer, known for his images of pop musicians and sports personalities. He was the resident photographer of the BBC Television programme Top of the Pops from its inception in 1964 until 1973.

== Career ==
Born in Fallowfield, Manchester, Goodwin was the son of a bookmaker and grew up in Chorlton-cum-Hardy, Manchester. After being drafted into the RAF in 1943, Goodwin's initial photography experience was loading cameras in reconnaissance planes flying over Japanese Territory in Burma. When his unit moved to Kuala Lumpur he borrowed the equipment to take photographs of the local girls to sell to his comrades. After the war ended he returned to Manchester and began taking pictures professionally on the beauty pageant and boxing circuits. His first celebrity subject was comedian Ken Dodd. In the 1960s a job as a scene-shifter at the BBC's Manchester Studios gave him the opportunity to shoot television personalities. When in 1964 the studio hosted Top of The Pops for its first 12-week run, producer Johnnie Stewart hired Goodwin to shoot the bands. His weekly fee was £30, which was considered very low; at the time, Mick Jagger advised him to demand more, but as a compromise, the programme's executive producer, Johnnie Stewart, gave Goodwin a weekly mention on the programme's closing credits. His pictures were used as backdrops for non-appearing artists and the chart rundown. He continued until 1973, missing only six shows in that time, in the process photographing every single act that entered the Top 30 of the UK Singles Chart, except for Frank Sinatra and Elvis Presley. Often he would be dispatched to get a shot of an absent act, and was known for his tenacity in gaining photo opportunities against all odds.

Goodwin first photographed the Beatles in 1963 at The Apollo in Manchester, and went on to have a close relationship with the band. In 2007 Yoko Ono opened a permanent exhibit of Goodwin's photographs at the John Lennon Airport in Liverpool. The exhibit came about after the airport director, Neil Pakey chanced upon some of Goodwin's photographs on display in a Chorlton-cum-Hardy Barber's.

Trained as a boxer as a young man, Goodwin had a lifelong affinity for sports and boxing in particular. He gained accreditation with the British Boxing Board of Control photographing many champions including Muhammad Ali. His photograph of Sir Matt Busby was used for his plaque at Old Trafford.

Goodwin was always reluctant to sell prints and only the later retrospective exhibits gave the public the opportunity to view his work.

Several Goodwin prints are in the collection of the National Portrait Gallery in London, as is a picture of him, with Muhammad Ali and John Conteh. The 1999 Icons of Pop exhibit included his photographs of Sandie Shaw and Tom Jones. In 2003, after John Lennon had been voted No. 10 (by national vote) from "one hundred Britons", a Goodwin portrait of Lennon was selected for inclusion in the NPG/BBC publication Great Britons: The great debate. The 2006 exhibit Beatles on the Balcony featured Goodwin's work.

In 2004 the Museum of Lancashire in Preston mounted an exhibit Legends: The Photographs of Harry Goodwin. The exhibit moved to Lancaster City Museum in 2005, and returned to Preston in 2007.

In 2008, a Victoria and Albert Museum exhibit about the costumes of The Supremes included his photographs, as did an accompanying book. The exhibit moved to The Grundy Art Gallery in Blackpool., before travelling on to Birmingham and Bristol.

In December 2009, Goodwin was presented with a Lifetime Achievement Award by the Lord Mayor of Manchester.

In 2010, the Victoria and Albert Museum mounted a major exhibit of his photographs My Generation: The Glory Years of British Rock – Photographs from Top of the Pops 1964–1973, and again published an accompanying book. In October 2011, My Generation: The Glory years of British Rock was displayed for free at The Public in West Bromwich.

In 2012, the University of Salford mounted an exhibition of Goodwin's photographs in their Clifford Whitworth Library, after he donated an archive of his work to the university.

== Death ==
In 2013, Goodwin became unwell and was admitted to Trafford General Hospital. While there he received calls from Paul McCartney, Alex Ferguson, and Barry Gibb. Goodwin died in September 2013, aged 89.

== Books ==
- The Story of The Supremes, (Daryl Easlea) V&A Publishing (2008). ISBN 978-1-85177-552-1
- My Generation: The Glory Years of British Rock (w/Alywn W. Turner) V&A Publishing (2010), ISBN 978-1-85177-597-2
