= Yellow Submarine (sculpture) =

Sculpture in Liverpool, England

Coordinates: 53.3378°N 2.8561°W

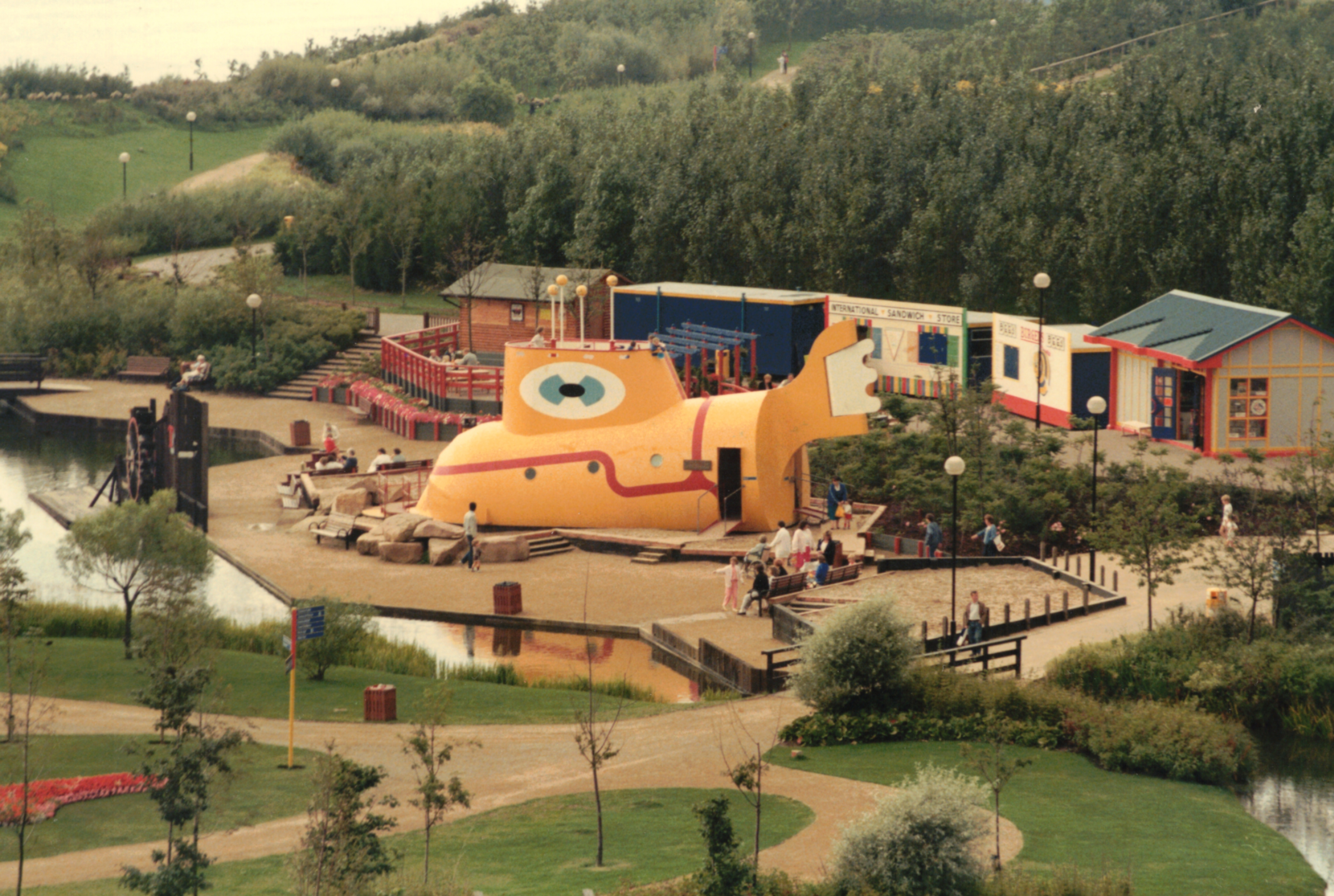
Yellow Submarine at the Liverpool International Garden Festival

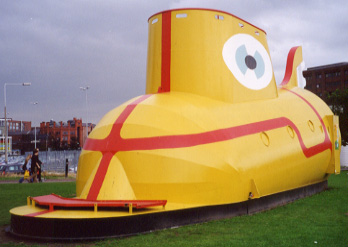
Yellow Submarine in Liverpool

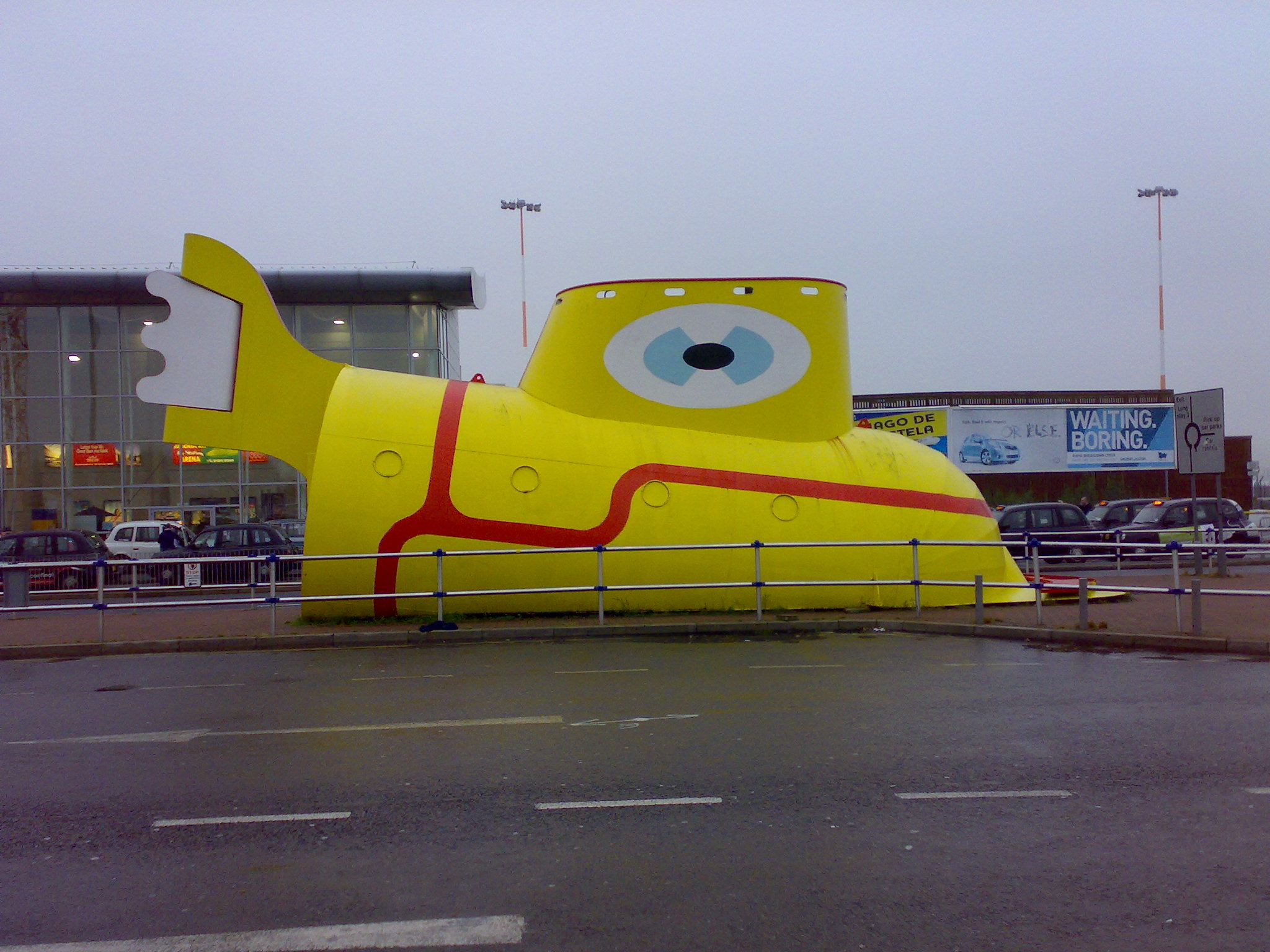
Yellow Submarine in its current location at Liverpool Airport

The Yellow Submarine in Liverpool is a large model representation of the submarine featured in the 1968 animated film Yellow Submarine, inspired by the 1966 song of the same name on The Beatles' album Revolver. It was built by a group of about 80 apprentices from Cammell Laird's shipyard, designed in part by Mr L Pinch, a draughtsman at the yard, for exhibition at the International Garden Festival in Liverpool in 1984. The Submarine was in a garden themed around the Beatles, one of 60 such themed gardens, and was highly popular. The garden took the form of an apple-shaped labyrinth, containing symbolic references to the group, and included a bronze statue of John Lennon, which now stands at Liverpool John Lennon Airport.

The Submarine itself is some 51 feet long (15.62 m) and 15 feet (4.57 m) high, and weighed 18 tons. Built of steel, it has a replica control cabin containing genuine submarine equipment, and twin spiral staircases leading to the bridge, which gave a panoramic view of the garden. These were accessible via doorways at the side. Painted in vivid yellow, the hull was tilted as if about to submerge.

After the Festival site closed, the Submarine was sited for several years in Chavasse Park, an open space in the city centre, where it was readily visible to traffic entering the city centre from the south. It was retired from public view when its condition deteriorated, but was renovated to find a new home at Liverpool John Lennon Airport in 2005. Airport boss Neil Pakey stated: "Other airports have the Concorde, we have the Yellow Submarine."
