= Henry Martyn Goodwin =

American minister

Henry Martyn Goodwin (June 8, 1820 – March 3, 1893) was an American minister and educator.

Goodwin, the second son of Caleb Goodwin, a leading merchant of Hartford, Connecticut, and Harriet (Williams) Goodwin, was born in Hartford on June 8, 1820. He graduated from Yale College in 1840. He began his theological studies in 1843 in the Union Seminary, New York City, whence he came to the Yale Divinity School in 1845 for the closing year of his course. In August, 1850, he took charge of the First Congregational Church in Rockford, Illinois, over which he was ordained in February, 1851. He resigned this charge at the end of the year 1871 and spent the next two years abroad. In 1875, he settled in Olivet, Michigan, where he was for twelve years associate pastor of the Congregational Church and Professor of English Literature in Olivet College, which gave him in 1876 the honorary degree of Doctor of Divinity. Late in the summer of 1892 he removed to the residence of a daughter in Williamstown, Mass., where he died after three days' illness, from pneumonia, on March 3, 1893, in his 73rd year.

He was a warm admirer of the Rev. Dr. Horace Bushnell, to whom he dedicated his most matured publication, a volume entitled Christ and Humanity; with a review of the Doctrine of Christ's Person (pp. xxv, 404), which appeared in 1875.

He married on November 6, 1854, Martha, daughter of Dr. John French, of Bath, New Hampshire, who died on March 17, 1876. Their children were two sons and two daughters.

His sermons and papers are held at the Congregational Library.
