= Henry Goodwin (musician) =

American jazz musician (1910–1979)

Henry Clay Goodwin (January 2, 1910, Columbia, South Carolina – July 2, 1979, New York City) was an American jazz trumpeter.

Goodwin learned to play drums and tuba in addition to trumpet while in high school in Washington, DC. He accompanied Claude Hopkins in Europe in 1925, and later in the 1920s he played with Cliff Jackson and Elmer Snowden. During the 1930s, he was with Lucky Millinder, Willie Bryant, Charlie Johnson, Cab Calloway, Kenny Clarke, and Edgar Hayes. Goodwin was primarily with Sidney Bechet and Cecil Scott during World War II, but he turned his focus away from big band ensembles after 1944, working with Scott in small groups as well as with Art Hodes, Mezz Mezzrow, and Bob Wilber. In the 1950s, he played with Jimmy Archey and Earl Hines, and occasionally with Dixieland revival groups during the 1960s.

Gunther Schuller described Goodwin as "a most assured swing stylist and specialist in the plunger and growl."
