= Liverpool John Lennon Airport =

International airport in Liverpool, England

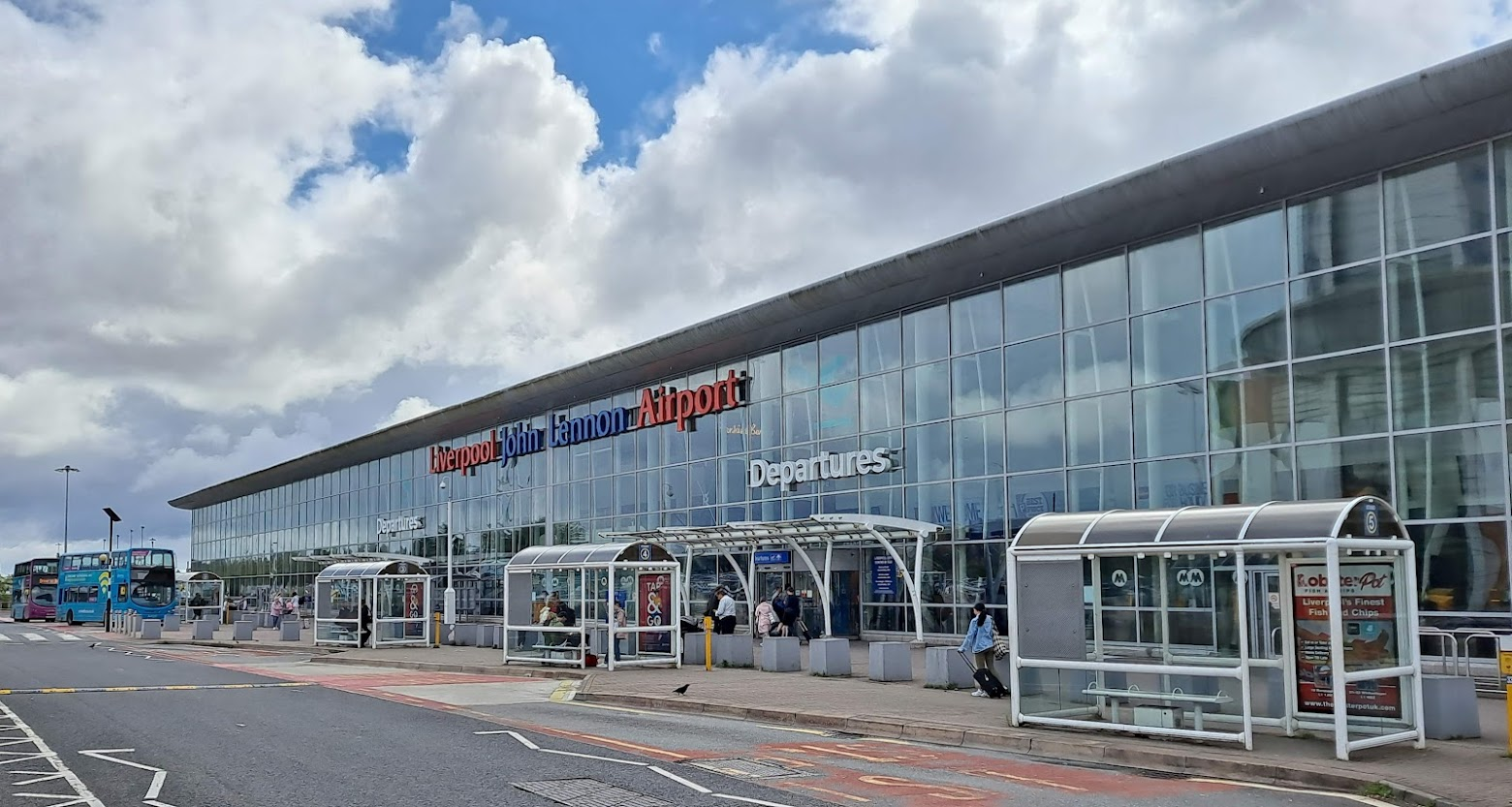
- IATA: LPL; ICAO: EGGP

Summary
- Airport type: Public
- Owner: Ancala Partners 94.2%; Liverpool City Council 5.8%
- Operator: Liverpool Airport Ltd.
- Serves: Liverpool City Region; North West England; North Wales
- Location: Speke, Liverpool, England
- Opened: 1 July 1933; 93 years ago
- Operating base for: easyJet; Jet2.com; Ryanair
- Elevation AMSL: 81 ft (25 m)
- Coordinates: 53°20′01″N 2°50′59″W
- Website: www.liverpoolairport.com

Map
- Location in Merseyside EGGP (England) EGGP (the United Kingdom)

Runways
Direction	Length		Surface
Direction	m	ft	Surface
09/27	2,286	7,500	Asphalt

Statistics (2025)
- Passengers: 5,600,000
- Passenger change 2023-24: ▲10.3
- Aircraft movements: 49,436
- Movements change 2022-23: ▲85%
- Sources: UK AIP at NATS; Statistics from the UK Civil Aviation Authority

Liverpool John Lennon Airport (IATA: LPL, ICAO: EGGP) is an international airport serving Liverpool, England, on the estuary of the River Mersey 7.5 miles (12 km) south-east of Liverpool city centre. Scheduled domestic, European, North African and Middle Eastern services are operated from the airport. The airport comprises a single passenger terminal, three general use hangars, a FedEx Express courier service centre as well as a single runway measuring 7,500 ft (2,286 m) in length, with the control tower south of the runway.

Originally called Speke Airport, as it is still colloquially known, it was operated by the Royal Air Force as RAF Speke in World War II. Between 1997 and 2007, annual passenger numbers increased from 689,468 to 5.47 million. It was renamed after Liverpudlian musician John Lennon of the Beatles in 2001. The airport handled 4.19 million passengers in 2023, making it the 12th-busiest airport in the UK.

== History ==
=== Imperial Airways ===
Built in part of the grounds of Speke Hall, Liverpool (Speke) Airport, as the airport was originally known, started scheduled flights in 1930 with a service by Imperial Airways via Barton Aerodrome near Eccles, Salford and Castle Bromwich Aerodrome, Birmingham to Croydon Airport near London. The airport was officially opened on 1 July 1933. By the late 1930s, air traffic from Liverpool was beginning to take off with increasing demand for Irish Sea crossings, and a distinctive passenger terminal, control tower and two large aircraft hangars were built.

=== Second World War ===
At the beginning of 1937, Liverpool City Council leased between 70 and 110 acres (28 and 45 hectares) of their Speke Estate on a 999-year lease to the Air Ministry. The price included at all times the use of Speke Airport next to the shadow factory site. The LMS Railway provided a siding. Erection of the building was planned to take 30 weeks and when complete it would provide employment for more than 5,000 people. It was to be managed by Rootes Securities on behalf of the Air Ministry. Work started Monday 15 February 1937.

During the Second World War, Speke was requisitioned by the Royal Air Force and known as RAF Speke. Rootes built in a "shadow factory" by the airport to produce Bristol Blenheims and 1,070 Handley Page Halifax bombers. Lockheed Aircraft Corporation assembled many types of planes at the airport, including Hudsons and Mustang fighters, that had been shipped from the United States in parts to Liverpool Docks. The airport was also home to the Merchant Ship Fighter Unit.

On 8 October 1940, Speke was witness to what is thought to be the fastest air-to-air combat "kilo" in the Battle of Britain and possibly of all time. Flight Lieutenant Denys Gillam took off in his Hawker Hurricane from Speke to be confronted by a Junkers Ju 88 passing across him. He shot the Junkers down while his undercarriage was still retracting, and, along with Alois Vašátko and Josef Stehlík, all of 312 Squadron, was credited with the kill. The moment has been caught in a painting by Robert Taylor called Fastest Victory.

=== Civil airport ===
Normal civil airline operations resumed after VE Day and passengers increased from 50,000 in 1945 to 75,000 in 1948, remaining ahead of Manchester Airport. Ownership by the Ministry of Aviation proved to be a drag on the airport's progress thereafter, and Manchester gained the lead from 1949, resulting in Liverpool's loss of the only ground-controlled radar approach unit available to North West airports, further hampering operation.

During the post-war years, Speke Airport hosted an annual air display in aid of the Soldiers, Sailors, and Air Force Association, a charity for veterans. The displays were immensely popular and attracted a huge crowd. On one such occasion on 21 May 1956, tragedy struck with the death of Léon Alfred Nicolas "Léo" Valentin, billed as the Birdman, when his balsa wood wings struck the opening of the aircraft from which he was exiting and he was hurtled into an uncontrollable spin. He attempted to deploy his emergency parachute, but it became entangled and 'Roman candled', leaving Leo to fall to his death. The local newspaper headlined the story with "The world has been robbed of a daring personality." Ironically, a few years earlier Valentin had been attributed with discovering the free-fall stable position still used by sports parachutists today for safe deployment.

=== New runway ===
The city took over control of the airport on 1 January 1961 and prepared development plans. In 1966, a new 7,500 ft (2,286 m) runway was opened by Prince Philip, Duke of Edinburgh on a new site to the southeast of the existing airfield. It enabled the airport to be open for business around the clock and is in use to this day. Control of the airport transferred to Merseyside County Council from Liverpool Corporation in the mid-1970s and then, ten years later, to the five Merseyside councils following the abolition of Merseyside County Council. In 1982, Pope John Paul II visited and met crowds at the old Liverpool airport.

=== Old terminal (1989) ===
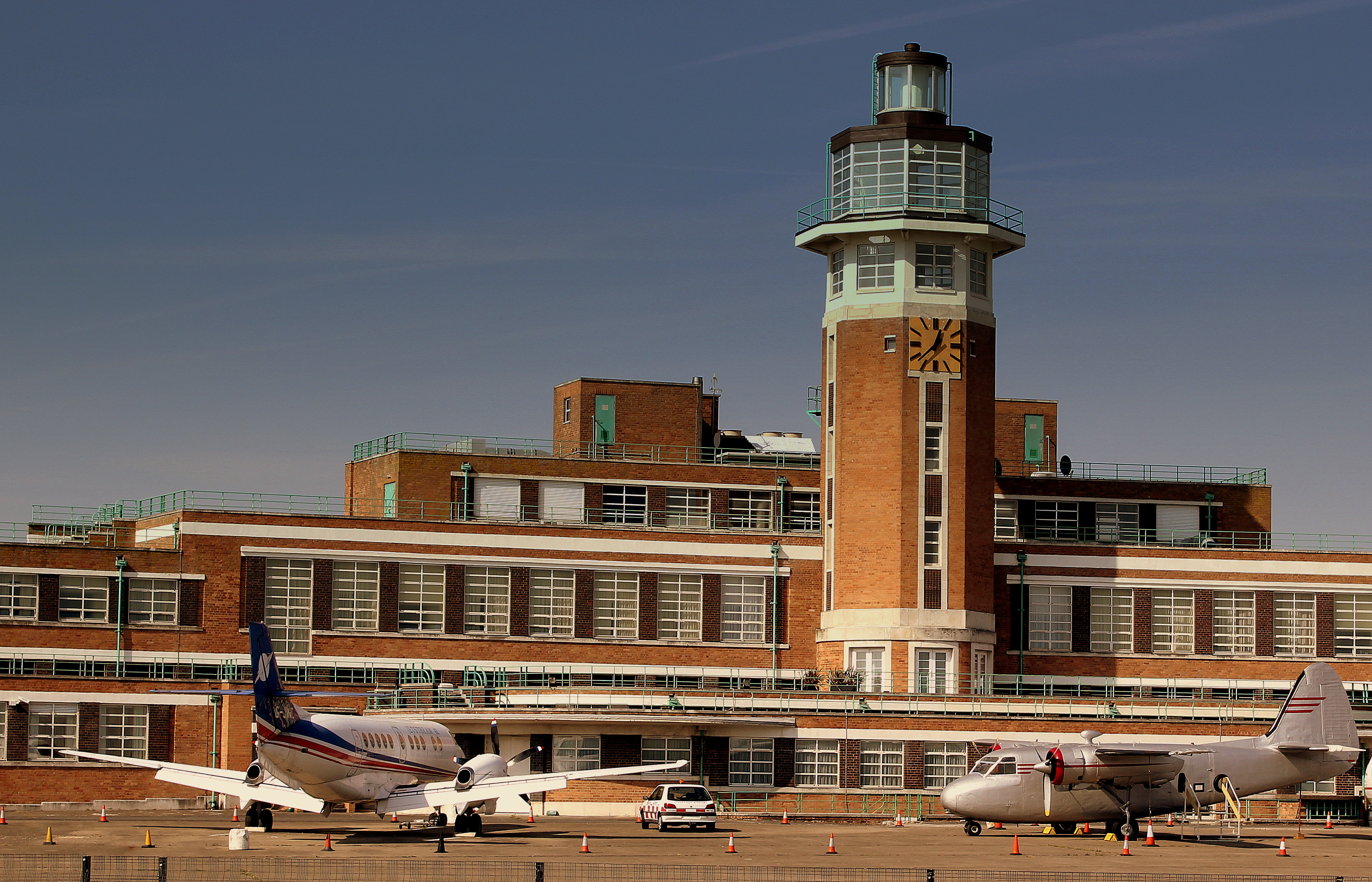
The old terminal building, used between the 1930s and 1986, now the Crowne Plaza Liverpool John Lennon Airport Hotel

A modern passenger terminal adjacent to the new runway opened in 1986 followed by the closure of the original 1930s building.

The original terminal building dating from the late 1930s, famously seen on early television footage with its terraces packed with Beatles fans, was left derelict until converted into a hotel, opening in 2001, preserving its Grade II listed Art Deco style. It was part of the Marriott chain of hotels, but is currently the Crowne Plaza Liverpool John Lennon Airport Hotel after a renovation in August 2008. The former apron of the terminal is also listed and retained in its original condition, although it is no longer connected to the airport or subject to airside access control. It is the home of several aircraft, including BAe Jetstream 41 prototype G-JMAC, preserved by the Speke Aerodrome Heritage Group, and Bristol Britannia G-ANCF. The two art-deco-style hangars that flank the terminal and apron have also been converted for new uses: one is now a David Lloyd leisure centre, the other the headquarters of the Very Group, called Skyways House.

In 1990, the airport was privatised, with British Aerospace taking a 76% shareholding in the new company. Subsequently, the airport has become a wholly owned subsidiary of Peel Holdings.

=== New terminal and renaming (2000) ===
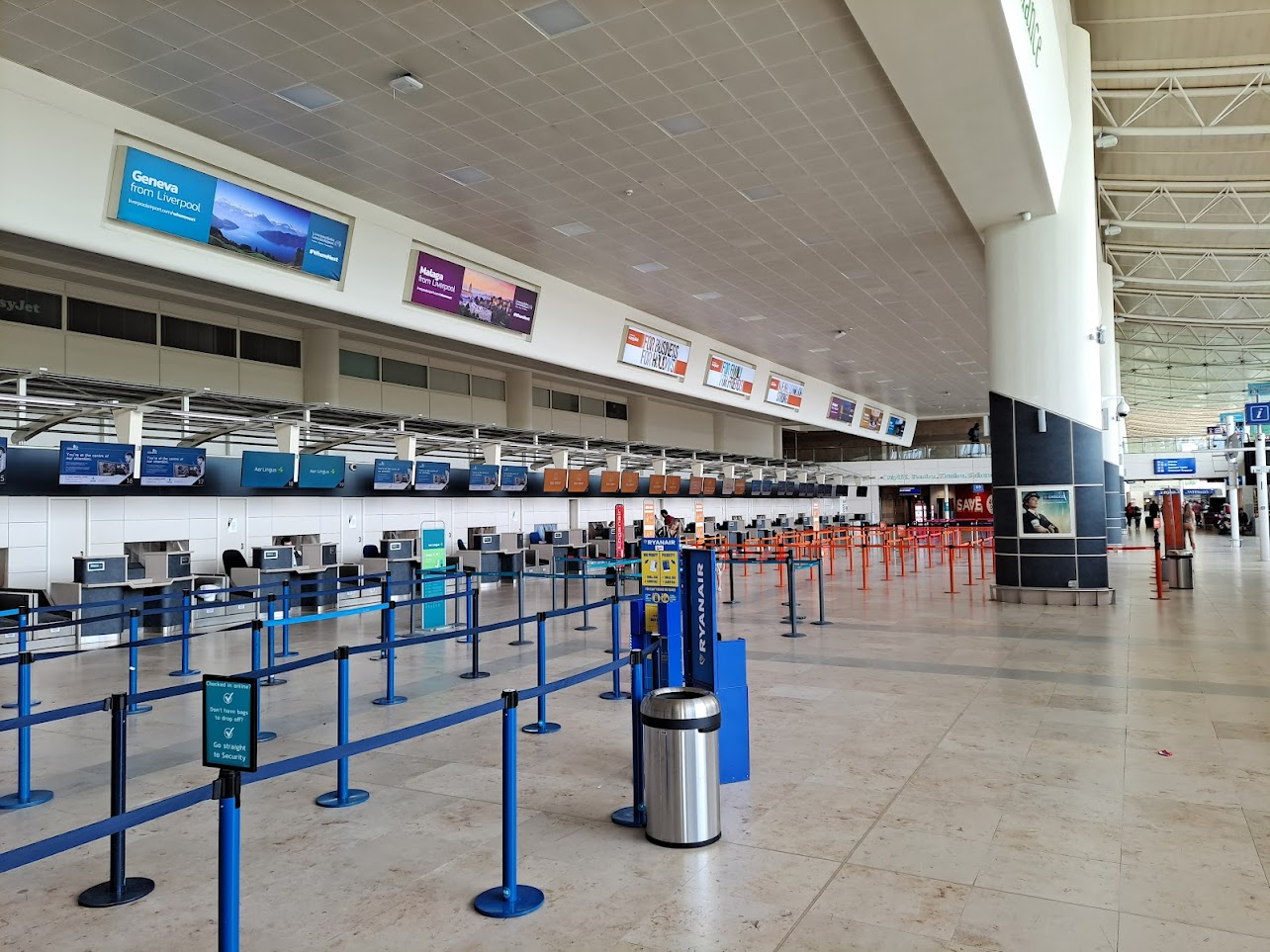
Check-in hall interior.

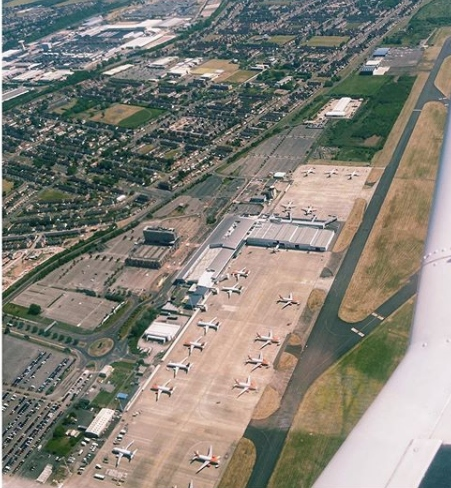
Aerial view of the airport - the passenger terminal, parking and general aviation hangars (in the top-right corner)

In 2000, work on a £42.5 million passenger terminal began, tripling its size and passenger capacity, completed in 2002 and opened by Queen Elizabeth II. There have since been further extensions to the airport terminal and airside.

In 2001, 21 years after his death, the airport was renamed in honour of the Beatles's John Lennon. A 7 ft (2.1 m) tall bronze statue stands overlooking the check-in hall. On the roof is painted the airport's motto, "Above us, only sky"; a line from Lennon's song "Imagine".

In 2005, the Yellow Submarine, a large-scale work of art, was installed on a traffic island at the entrance to the airport. A permanent exhibition of photographs of the Beatles in India, taken by Paul Saltzman in 1968 at the ashram of Maharishi Mahesh Yogi, can be seen above the retail units in the departure lounge.

In 2005, a new apron was constructed exclusively for EasyJet, to the east of the terminal with six stands and a pier with six boarding gates.

In September 2006, reconstruction started on the main runway and taxiways. This was the first time the runway had been reconstructed (as opposed to resurfaced) since it was opened in 1966. This work was completed in 2007. In addition to runway and shoulder work was the upgrade of the 40-year-old airfield group lighting with a new system, intended to upgrade the runway to ILS Category III standards.

In May 2007, Flyglobespan commenced a seasonal flight to Hamilton, 50 miles (80 km) from Toronto. This was the Liverpool airport's first transatlantic air service. Later that month, the carrier launched a route to New York City using a Boeing 757. Four of the seven weekly flights were nonstop, while the other three operated via Knock, Ireland. Yoko Ono, the widow of John Lennon, attended the inauguration ceremony. Several problems beset the service, including technical issues with the aircraft, lengthy delays and low passenger numbers. Flyglobespan ended up replacing the Boeing 757 with a smaller 737 due to the poor patronage. The company ended flights to both New York and Hamilton in October 2007.

In 2007, construction of a multi-level car park and a Hampton by Hilton hotel started. The hotel opened in October 2009. In June 2010, Vancouver Airport Services announced that it reached an agreement with The Peel Group to acquire 65% share in its airports, including Liverpool. In 2008, the airport hosted a public art exhibit. Liverpool 08 Collection, when Liverpool was the European Capital of Culture. Airside improvements include additional retail units and a more advanced security area aiming at reducing waiting times, completed in autumn 2010.

In April 2014, Peel repurchased the 65% stake it had sold in the airport giving it 100% ownership once more. In March 2016, Peel sold a 20% stake in the airport to Liverpool City Council for a reported £12M. This valued the airport at £60M. From 2019 to early 2020, the airport completed some renovation works which made it even easier to get around and also more aesthetically pleasing. This included changing the gate numbers from gates 30–43 to gates 11–17, in order to make the gates larger and more spacious, which also involved removing two by merging gates together. In addition, the departure hall, security hall and the entire experience throughout the airport has been altered massively by new decorations and images promoting the surrounding region.

In 2024, the airport was 47% owned by Peel, 47% by investment manager Ancala Partners, and 5% by Liverpool City Council. In October 2025, Peel relinquished all their shares.

=== Future expansion ===
Possible future developments include an investment of perhaps £100 million in the airport infrastructure: this might include a runway extension (enabling transatlantic/long-haul flights) as well as a new cargo area south of the runway, new taxiway, terminal expansion (including new food/drink outlets, larger security areas as well as 3 new piers/concourses), hotel/parking expansion as well as the plans for a new A-road to enhance motorway connections to the facilities. In addition, the airport wants to build a nature reserve on the coastal perimeter of the Oglet Shore. Plans also include schemes to improve public transport connections to the airport, including new bus and rail services to South Parkway.

== Terminal ==
The single terminal at Liverpool John Lennon Airport has a capacity of 7 million passengers a year and consists of an arrivals and a departures hall, both connected within short walking distance of each other. There are no jet bridges or travelators at Liverpool, requiring passengers to walk to/from the departure/arrival halls and gates. There are a number of retail and food outlets in the airport.

== Airport directors ==
Captain Harold James Andrews was appointed as the first airport manager in July 1932, and he was effectively the first full-time professional co-ordinator for the whole project. Jack Chadwick took over many of the management functions post-war until 1961. That year there was a traffic increase of 42%, attributed to the first airport marketing campaign initiated by the new airport director, Wing Commander H.W.G.Andrews.

In the late 1960s, Brian Trunkfield was the assistant director, and Keith Porter took over as airport director in the days when The Beatles were regular passengers. Chris Preece, a former executive of British Aerospace, was airport director during much of the British Aerospace years of ownership, replaced by Rod Rufus and then Rod Hill, who brought in Direct Holidays, part of the MyTravel Group on a commercial deal which was to prove the market for easyJet. Neil Pakey took over as managing director in 2002, taking the airport through its major passenger growth years.

On selling the airport to Vancouver Airport Services in 2010, the former operations director for Vancouver Airport, Craig Richmond, took over, and on 1 March 2013, Matthew Thomas, also from Vancouver Airport Services (by then renamed Vantage Airport Group), was appointed to the role. Andrew Cornish held the CEO position from September 2014 until the end of June 2017. John Irving became the new CEO with effect from 12 March 2018.

== Airlines and destinations ==
The following airlines operate regular scheduled flights to and from Liverpool:

Airlines	Destinations
Aer Lingus	Dublin
easyJet	Alicante, Amsterdam, Antalya, Barcelona, Belfast–City, Belfast–International, Berlin, Derry, Enfidha, Faro, Fuerteventura, Gran Canaria, Hurghada, Isle of Man, Jersey, Kraków, Lanzarote, Lisbon, Málaga, Malta, Marrakesh, Naples, Palma de Mallorca, Paris–Charles de Gaulle, Prague, Sharm El Sheikh, Tenerife–South; Seasonal: Almería, Bodrum, Corfu, Dalaman, Geneva, Girona (begins 28 March 2027), Heraklion, Kos, Larnaca, Murcia (begins 3 May 2027), Nice, Salzburg, Seville, Split, Vienna
Jet2.com	Alicante, Antalya, Fuerteventura, Funchal, Gran Canaria, Lanzarote, Málaga, Tenerife–South; Seasonal: Bergen, Bodrum, Burgas, Corfu, Dalaman, Faro, Heraklion, Ibiza, Kos, Kraków, Malta, Menorca, Palma de Mallorca, Paphos, Prague, Reus, Reykjavík–Keflavík, Rhodes, Vienna, Zakynthos
Loganair	Isle of Man
Ryanair	Alicante, Barcelona, Bergamo, Budapest, Copenhagen, Cork, Dublin, Faro, Kaunas, Knock, Košice, Kraków, Madrid, Málaga, Malta, Marrakesh, Paphos, Poznań, Shannon, Sofia, Szczecin, Tenerife–South, Tirana, Warsaw–Modlin, Wrocław; Seasonal: Bergerac, Corfu, Fuerteventura, Ibiza, Lanzarote, Palma de Mallorca, Porto, Reus, Rome–Ciampino, Rovaniemi, Turin, Zadar
Wizz Air	Bucharest–Otopeni, Iași, Warsaw–Chopin

== Statistics ==
=== Passengers and aircraft movements ===
Year	Passenger numbers		Aircraft movements	
Year	Total	% change (year on year)	Total	% change (year on year)
1997	689,468	–	83,354	–
1998	873,172	▲26.6	86,871	▲4.2
1999	1,304,959	▲49.5	75,489	▼13.1
2000	1,982,711	▲51.9	76,257	▲1.0
2001	2,253,398	▲13.7	74,659	▼2.1
2002	2,835,871	▲25.8	74,313	▼0.5
2003	3,177,009	▲12.0	84,405	▲13.6
2004	3,353,350	▲5.6	85,393	▲1.2
2005	4,411,243	▲31.5	92,970	▲8.9
2006	4,963,886	▲12.5	91,263	▼1.8
2007	5,468,510	▲10.2	86,668	▼5.0
2008	5,334,152	▼2.5	84,890	▼2.1
2009	4,884,494	▼8.4	79,298	▼6.6
2010	5,013,940	▲2.7	68,164	▼14.0
2011	5,251,161	▲4.7	69,055	▲1.3
2012	4,463,257	▼15.0	60,270	▼12.7
2013	4,187,439	▼6.2	55,839	▼7.4
2014	3,986,654	▼4.8	52,249	▼6.4
2015	4,301,495	▲7.9	55,905	▲7.0
2016	4,778,939	▲11.1	62,441	▲11.7
2017	4,901,157	▲3.0	56,643	▼9.0
2018	5,042,312	▲3.0	59,320	▲5.0
2019	5,043,975	0.0	58,968	▼1.0
2020	1,338,000	▼73.5	13,300	▼77.5
2021	1,165,508	▼1.1	13,233	▼1.0
2022	3,490,844	▲199.5	26,766	▲102.2
2023	4,193,623	▲20.1	49,436	▲84.7
2024	5,074,266	▲21.0	51,715	▲4.6
2025	5,600,000	▲10.3		

=== Route statistics ===
Busiest routes to and from Liverpool (2025)
Rank	Airport	Total passengers	Change 2024 / 25
1	Dublin	566,596	▲9.7%
2	Alicante	380,613	▲13.7%
3	Belfast–International	358,462	▼10.0%
4	Málaga	302,159	▲20.7%
5	Tenerife–South	302,159	▲21.4%
6	Palma de Mallorca	272,545	▲9.9%
7	Faro	221,007	▲0.1%
8	Lanzarote	178,711	▲12.6%
9	Isle of Man	156,414	▼12.0%
10	Amsterdam	126,393	▲0.5%

== Ground transport ==
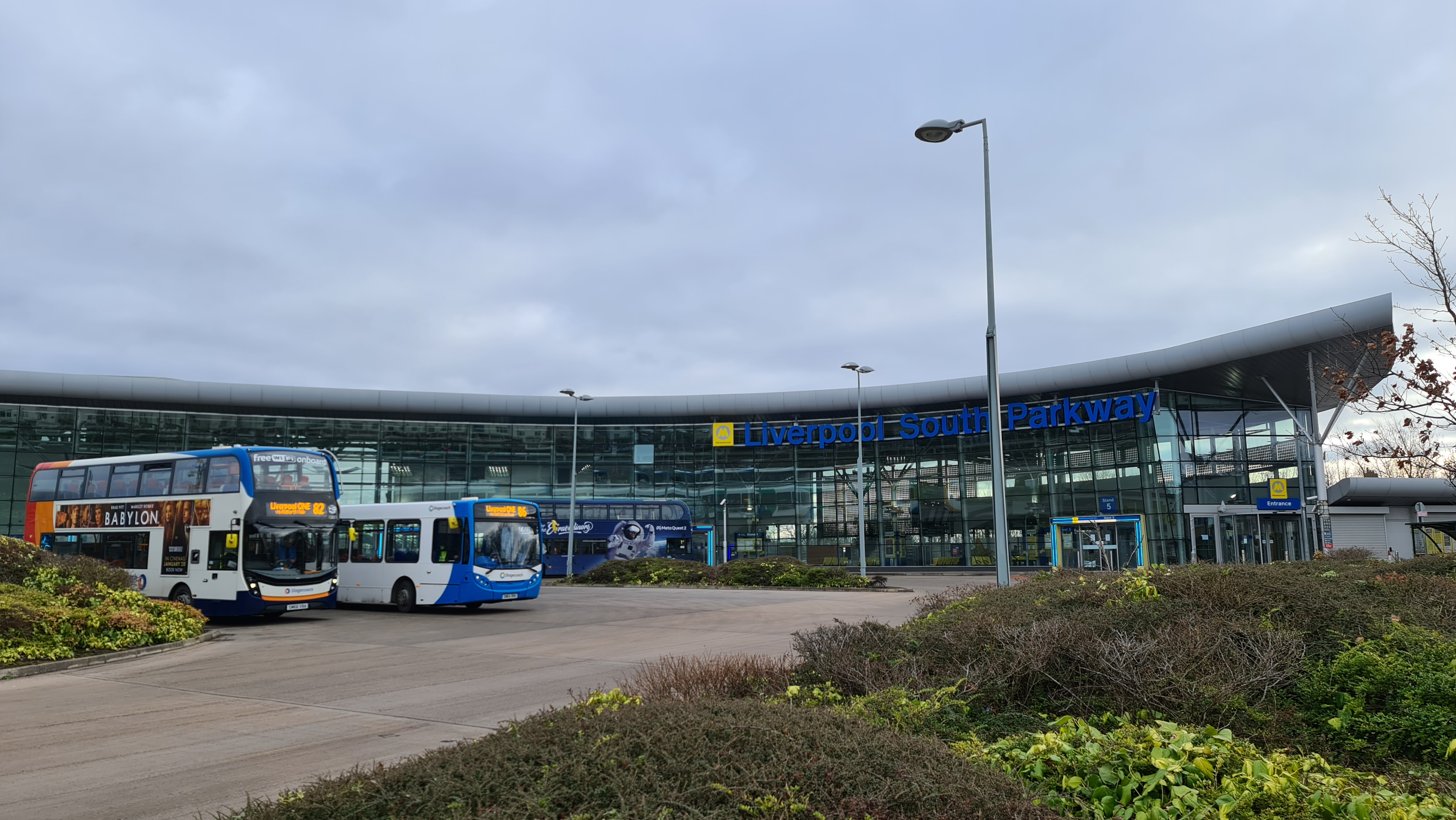
Liverpool South Parkway railway station was built to improve links to the airport.

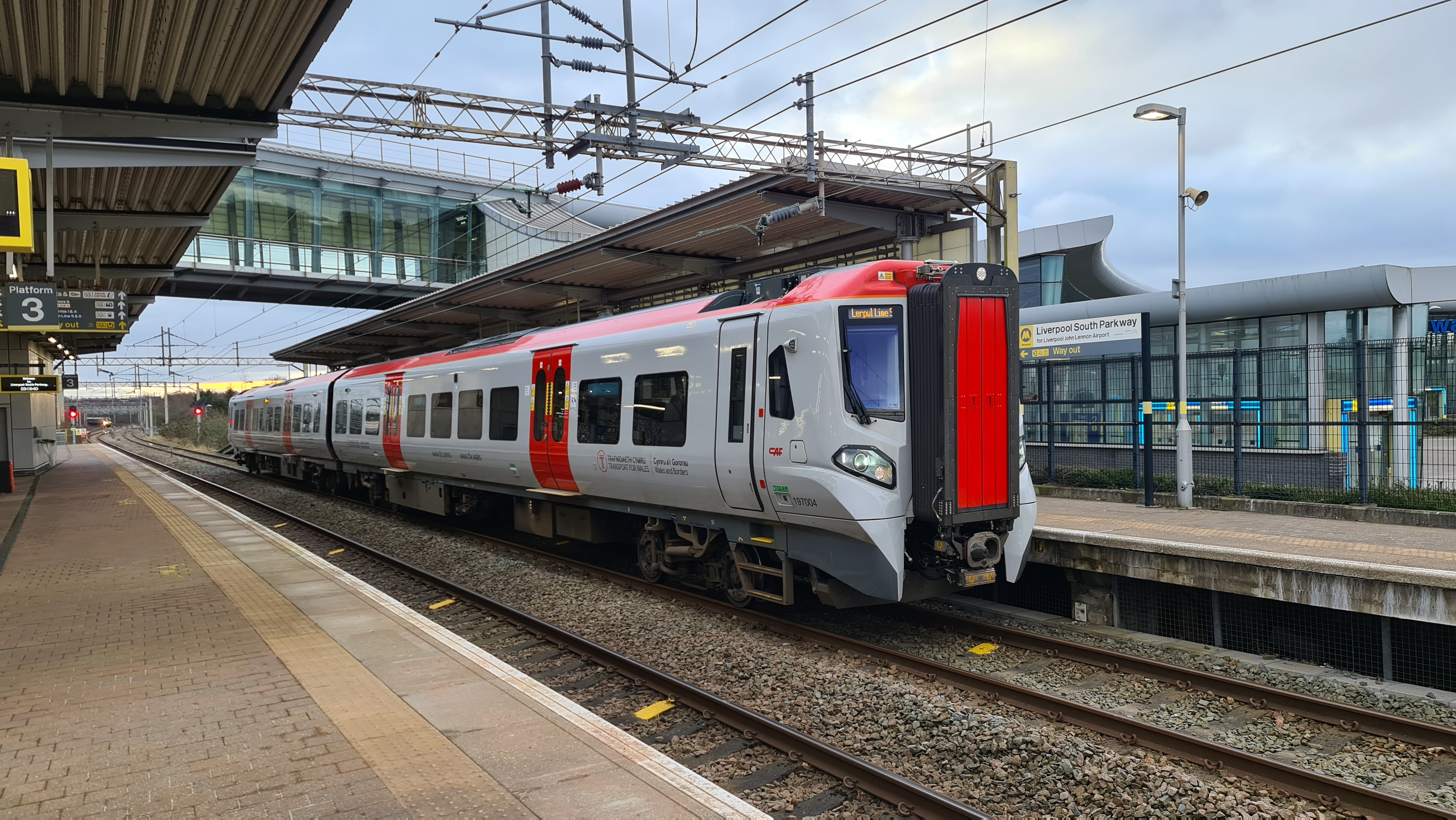
Platform view at Liverpool South Parkway Station.

Liverpool John Lennon Airport is within Merseytravel Area C, for local public transport tickets. Plusbus tickets are also available. Arriva North West provides buses to Liverpool City Centre. There is also an express service Arriva North West 500 that connects the airport with the city centre every 30 minutes

=== Road ===
The airport is accessible from the A533/Runcorn Widnes Bridge and Mersey Gateway Bridge to the south and from the M57 and Knowsley Expressway to the north.

=== Rail ===
The nearest Merseyrail Northern Line station is Hunts Cross at 2.2 miles (3.5 km) away, where there are frequent services to Liverpool Central and Ormskirk.

Liverpool South Parkway at 2.9 miles (4.7 km) from the airport is the closest intercity railway station, where there are Avanti West Coast, East Midlands Railway, London Northwestern Railway, Merseyrail, Northern Trains, TransPennine Express and Transport for Wales regular services.

=== Bus and coach ===
Regular bus services link the airport with surrounding urban areas, operated by Arriva North West and Merseytravel.

== Facilities ==
=== Hotels ===
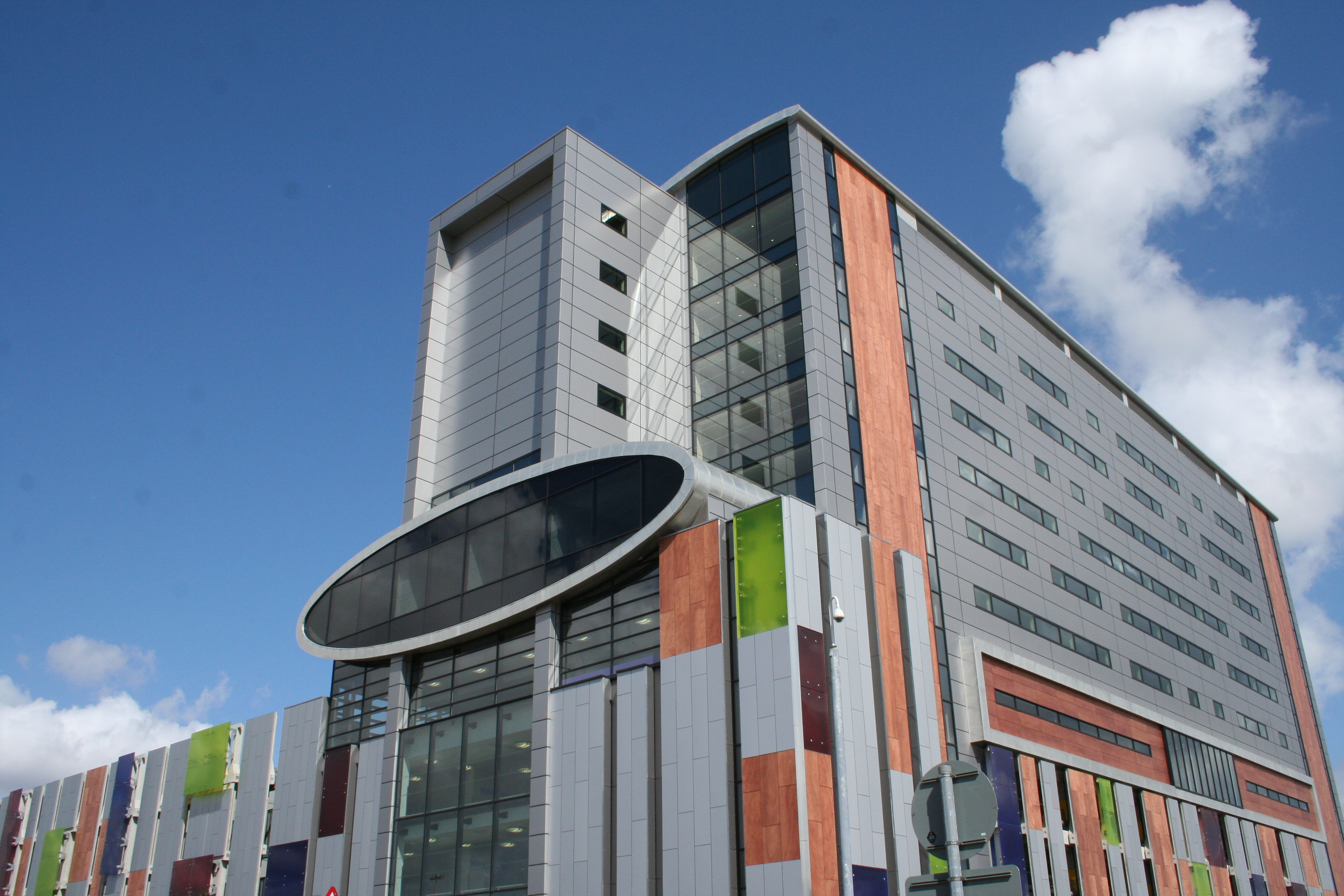
The Hampton by Hilton Liverpool John Lennon Airport

The original terminal building dating from the late 1930s, famously seen on 1960s television footage with its terraces packed with Beatles' fans, was part of the Marriott chain of hotels. It became the Crowne Plaza Liverpool John Lennon Airport Hotel after a renovation in August 2008.

The Hampton by Hilton Liverpool/John Lennon Airport is one of four Hilton Worldwide hotels in Liverpool. It is situated directly opposite the main terminal building, and is the second largest hotel serving the complex after the Crowne Plaza. The hotel was constructed as part of a £37 million development by Peel Holdings at John Lennon Airport (which also included a multi-storey car park).

There is also a Premier Inn and a Travelodge UK within walking distance to the airport terminal.

== Accidents and incidents ==
- On 20 July 1965 Vickers Viscount G-AMOL of Cambrian Airways crashed on approach from Isle of Man Airport, killing the two crew members on board as well as two people on the ground.
- On 10 May 2001 Spanair Flight 3203 (McDonnell Douglas MD-83 EC-FXI) was substantially damaged when the starboard undercarriage collapsed on landing from Palma de Mallorca Airport. All 51 people on board evacuated via the escape slides. It was repaired and returned to service five months later.

== See also ==
- The Yellow Submarine sculpture, previously displayed in Liverpool's Albert Dock, is now outside the airport entrance.
