= Neil Pakey =

British business executive

Neil Pakey (born 15 January 1961) is the CEO of Nieuport Aviation and has been Chair of the UK's Regional and Business Airports Group since 2016. He was CEO of Shannon Airport until June 2016. His 3-year tenure in turning around Shannon was regarded as a major success, according to Shannon Group chairwoman Rose Hynes. He was elected Chairman of the UK Regional and Business Airports’ Group in 2016.

Prior to joining Shannon he was an aviation industry spokesperson and presenter and was formerly Chair of the UK Airport Operators Association from 2006 to 2009, and managing director of one of Europe's fastest growing airports, Liverpool John Lennon Airport from 2002 to 2010, where annual passengers numbers increased from 867,000 in 1998 to 5.47 million in 2007. Pakey was appointed CEO of the Peel Airport's Group in 2005. He was awarded IOD Liverpool Director of the Year in 2006 and won the regional business accolade, Downtowner of the Year in Liverpool in 2006. He was recognised with an Honorary Fellowship from the University of Central Lancashire in 2008 for his contribution to tourism and the regional economy.

== Life and career ==
Pakey was educated at Marr College, Troon and the University of Central Lancashire before going to the University of Westminster and the Chartered Institute of Marketing, Maidenhead, where he gained a MSc in Transport Planning and Management and a postgraduate diploma in Marketing respectively. In 1991 he was recognised as a Fellow of the Chartered Institute of Logistics and Transport and in 1994 as a Fellow of the Chartered Institute of Marketing.

Pakey was the Chairman of the Airport Operators Association (AOA) from 2006 to 2009 and served on the Board in total from 2002 to 2012, speaking on behalf of the industry on key industry affairs. He was the first Chairman of the AOA to be elected by his peer group of Airport CEO's for three consecutive terms, championing the Sustainable Aviation ideology. He was recognised as an Honorary Member of the AOA in 2012. He also served on the National Aviation Security Committee from 2006 to 2012. He has presented to a range of UK government Committees including the Transport Select Committee and the Welsh Affairs Select Committee.

== European Commission ==
Pakey was appointed as the UK representative to the European Commission’s Air Transport Policy Unit as Expert Detachee, or National Expert for the UK from 1991 to 1994. During the time the Unit created and delivered the air transport liberalisation package or the so-called historic 3rd package. He was later Chairman of FARE, the Federation of European Regional Airports from 2007–2010.

== Previous airline experience ==
Pakey was previously employed by two airlines, British Caledonian Airways and Air Seychelles. He started out at British Caledonian on the passenger check-in counters and as a cargo agent and when he later moved to Air Seychelles, he did so to become their general manager of Marketing and Industry Affairs. He was also previously employed by Manchester Airport where he both headed up the Operations Planning, Business Planning and Air Service Development teams and became GM for Service Quality in 1995, the year Manchester Airport won the IATA Best World Airport award.

== Other activities ==
Pakey served as a non-executive director on the Yorkshire Tourist Board (2005–2010) and the Chairman of Mersey Tourism from 2002 to 2005, at the time when Liverpool won the European Capital of Culture award. Pakey also served on the board of the regional inward investment agency, Business Liverpool from 2005 to 2008.

== Liverpool John Lennon Airport ==
Peel Holdings employed Pakey when investing £50m into Liverpool Airport and looking for someone to grow the business and bring in new airlines and routes. In his executive role as CEO of Liverpool Airport, Pakey led the revival of Liverpool Airport, taking traffic levels from 700,000 passengers to 5.5 million per annum, also renaming the airport after Liverpool's famous son John Lennon, a move described at the time as ‘utter genius’ by Locum Destination Review.

In their book The Themed Space, editor Scott Lukas and co-author Peter Adey describe how the rebranding to John Lennon Airport, changed market perceptions, loyalty and ultimately the passenger numbers using the airport. "The rebranding exercise helped the airport mediate between and collapse the geographical scales and distances. The airport was able to force its way into the global audience that John Lennon and The Beatles had fostered and entertained. By connecting these scales the airport did not only raise awareness but it helped stimulate a sense of belonging and ownership. The rebranding reinforced the sense that the airport was something owned by the locality."

Pakey later co-credited his Peel Holding's chairman John Whittaker with the idea which he originally had on visiting John Wayne Orange County Airport. It was in June 2001 when, not long after the John Lennon naming was announced, Pakey and Peel received the acknowledgement for inspiring the renaming of the Louis Armstrong New Orleans Airport from the President of the airport.

Pakey secured major growth from the likes of easyJet and Ryanair at Liverpool, as well as many new airlines, some short-lived including a daily New York service with Flyglobespan. Pakey managed the airport through major strike action in 2003 without disruption to passenger flights. Pakey also led the Peel Airport's team in the conversion of RAF Finningley to Doncaster Sheffield Airport, the only new full runway length airport to open since the war. Most recently, Pakey was supporting the Vantage Airport Group from Vancouver who purchased Liverpool John Lennon Airport, with their global acquisitions and management of airports in the Caribbean, Canada and Cyprus.

== Shannon Airport ==
Pakey was the first chief executive appointed after the Irish Government made Shannon independent from Dublin Airport Authority. He oversaw the establishment of the Shannon Group, a new State company responsible for both the airport and developing an aviation business centre on its surrounding land. He was credited by Shannon Group chairwoman as having made "a vital contribution to the revitalisation of Shannon Airport and formation of the wider group." Under his tenure Shannon Airport achieved 5% growth in 2015 with three-successive years of passenger increases. It was announced in December 2015 that his 3-year contract would not be renewed, in what was described as "a major blow for the region". The news of Pakey's impending departure provoked substantial local surprise as he was considered to be doing outstanding work for Shannon.

== Personal life ==
Neil Pakey lives in Manchester, England and Toronto. He was diagnosed with diabetes when 21 years old, and has attributed his competitive drive to his development of diabetes and has also supported the JDRF as the regional fundraising walk chairman for Merseyside.
