= Goodwin (surname) =

Goodwin is a surname.

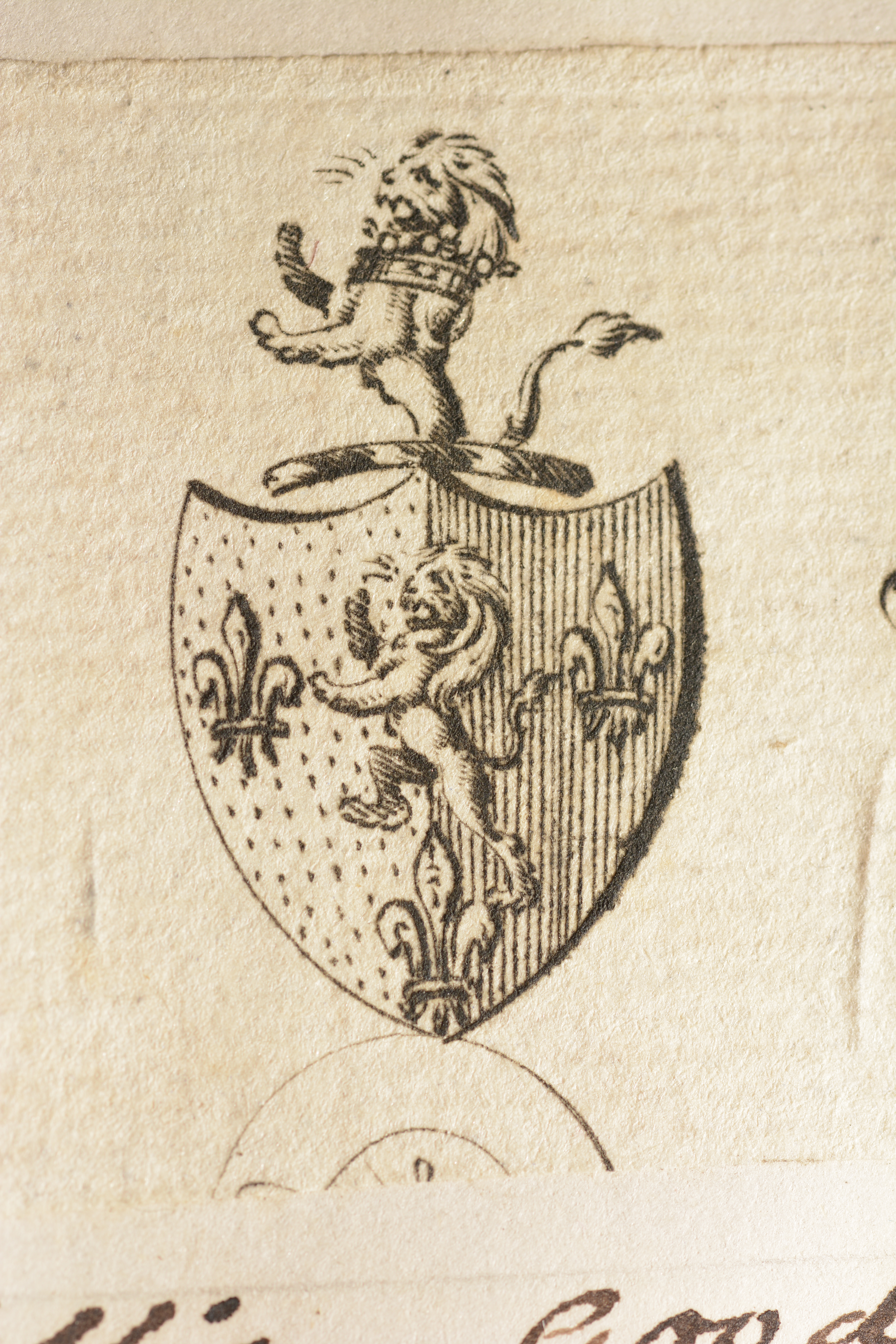
Goodwin coat of arms

Notable people with the surname include:

- Albert Goodwin (disambiguation), several people
- Alexander T. Goodwin (1837–1899), American politician from New York
- Alfred Goodwin (1923–2022), American judge
- Alfred Goodwin (pentathlete) (1902–1920), British modern pentathlete
- Alice Phelps Goodwin (1875–1935), American nurse and cookbook writer
- Andrew Goodwin (tenor) (living), Australian tenor
- Andrew Goodwin (cricketer) (born 1982), English cricketer
- Archie Goodwin (disambiguation), several people
- Barry Goodwin, American economist
- Betty Goodwin (1923–2008), Canadian artist
- Brandon Goodwin (basketball) (born 1995), American basketball player
- Brian Goodwin (1931–2009), Canadian mathematician
- Bridget Goodwin*****, New Zealand goldminer and character
- Bronx Goodwin (born 1984), Australian rugby player, son of Ted
- Bryson Goodwin (born 1985), Australian rugby player, son of Ted
- Candice Goodwin, chemical engineer and microbiologist turned writer, producer, podcaster and paranormal investigator
- Carte Goodwin (born 1974), American politician from West Virginia
- Charles Wycliffe Goodwin (1817–1878), British egyptologist, bible scholar, lawyer and judge
- Craig Goodwin (born 1991), Australian soccer player
- Craufurd Goodwin (1934–2017), Canadian-born American historian of economic thought
- Daisy Goodwin (born 1961), British television producer, poetry anthologist and novelist
- Dan Goodwin (born 1955), American stuntman
- Daniel Raynes Goodwin (1811–1890), American clergyman
- Denis Goodwin (1929–1975), British comedy writer
- Derek Goodwin (1920–2008), British ornithologist
- Deryck Goodwin (1927–1997), British physicist
- Doris Kearns Goodwin (born 1943), American historian
- Dorothy Goodwin (1914–2007), American educator and politician
- Elaine M. Goodwin (living), British mosaic artist
- Felix Goodwin (1884–1935), music publisher
- Francis Goodwin (disambiguation), several people
- Fred Goodwin (born 1958), British banker
- Freddie Goodwin (1933–2016), English football player
- George Goodwin Jr. (1786–1878), American politician from Connecticut
- Ginnifer Goodwin (born 1978), American actress
- Gordon Goodwin (1954–2025), American jazz pianist, saxophonist, composer, arranger and conductor
- Gordon Goodwin (athlete) (1895–?), British athlete
- Hannibal Goodwin (1822–1900), American Episcopal priest and film technology inventor
- Harold Goodwin (disambiguation), several people
- Harry Goodwin (1924–2013), British photographer
- Harry Goodwin (cricketer) (1870–1955), cricketer
- Henry B. Goodwin (1878–1931), Swedish photographer and expert on Nordic languages
- Ichabod Goodwin (1796–1882), American politician from New Hampshire
- Isobel Goodwin (born 2002), English footballer who plays in the Women's Super League
- Jason Goodwin (born 1964), British writer and historian
- Jeff Goodwin (born 1958), American sociology expert
- Jeff Goodwin (cricketer) (1929–2006), English cricketer
- Jennie Goodwin (living), New Zealand journalist, television newsreader and continuity announcer
- Jim Goodwin (born 1981), Irish footballer
- Jim Goodwin (baseball) (1926–2008), American baseball player
- Jimi Goodwin (born 1970), English rock musician, The Doves
- John Goodwin (disambiguation), several people
- Jonathan Goodwin (disambiguation), several people
- Josh Goodwin (born 1983), American basketball player
- Keith Goodwin (1938–2003), English cricketer
- Ken Goodwin (disambiguation), several people
- Laurel Goodwin (1942–2022), American actress
- Lavinia Stella Goodwin (1833–1911), American author, educator
- Luke Goodwin (born 1973), Australian rugby league footballer
- Marquise Goodwin (born 1990), American football player
- Maryellen Goodwin (1964–2023), American politician
- Matt Goodwin (rugby league) (born 1960), Australian rugby league footballer
- Matt Goodwin (Canadian football) (born 1950), Canadian footballer
- Matt Goodwin (author) (born 1981), British political scientist
- Melanie Wade Goodwin (1970–2020), American politician from North Carolina
- Murray Goodwin (born 1972), Zimbabwean cricketer
- Nat Goodwin (1857–1919), American actor and vaudevillian
- Paul Goodwin (conductor) (born 1956), English conductor and oboist
- Paul Goodwin (cricketer) (born 1978), English cricketer
- Paul Goodwin (curator) (living), British independent curator, academic and researcher
- Philip L. Goodwin (1885-1958), American architect
- Philip R. Goodwin (1881–1935), American painter and illustrator
- Raven Goodwin (born 1992), American actress
- Sir Reg Goodwin (1908–1986), British politician
- Ron Goodwin (1925–2003), British composer and conductor
- Richard B Goodwin (born 1934), British film producer
- Richard M. Goodwin (1913–1996), American economist
- Richard N. Goodwin (1931–2018), American writer, lawyer, and speechwriter
- Robert Felix Goodwin (1852–1919), music librarian
- Russell Goodwin, Wisconsin politician
- Sam Goodwin (1943–2005), Scottish footballer
- Sid Goodwin (1915–1980), Australian rugby player
- Simon Goodwin (born 1976), Australian football player
- Suzanne Goodwin (1916–2008), British novelist
- Ted Goodwin (born 1953), Australian rugby player
- Thomas Goodwin (1600–1680), British Puritan preacher
- Tom Goodwin (born 1968), American baseball player
- Trudie Goodwin (born 1951), English actress
- W. A. R. Goodwin (1869–1939), American preacher and preservationist
- Wayne Goodwin (born 1967), American politician
- William Goodwin (disambiguation), several people

== Fictional characters ==
- Archie Goodwin (character), a fictional detective from the Nero Wolfe books
- Barbara Goodwin, a character in the American sitcom television series The Hogan Family
- Josh Goodwin (EastEnders), from the British soap opera
