= Godwin =

Godwin is an English-language given name and surname with Anglo-Saxon origins. It means God's friend and is thus equivalent to Theophilus, Jedediah, Amadeus and Reuel.

However, the word "Godwin" can also mean "helper of mankind"

== Surname or only known name ==
=== House of Godwin ===
- Ancestry of the Godwins
- Godwin, Earl of Wessex (died 1053), earl in England under the Danish king Cnut the Great
  - Harold Godwinson
    - Edmund, son of Harold Godwinson
    - Godwin, son of Harold Godwinson
    - Harold, son of Harold Godwinson
    - Magnus, son of Harold Godwinson
    - Ulf, son of Harold Godwinson
  - Gyrth Godwinson
  - Sweyn Godwinson
  - Tostig Godwinson
  - Leofwine Godwinson
  - Wulfnoth Godwinson

=== Politics and governance ===
- Abraham Godwin (1763–1835), New Jersey General Assembly 1802–1806, Elector for Andrew Jackson 1828
- Abraham Godwin Jr. (1791–1849), New Jersey General Assembly 1821–1832, took vote to D.C. for Presidential Election 1840
- Hannibal Lafayette Godwin (1873–1929), North Carolina Congressman
- Helen Godwin, British politician
- Mary Wollstonecraft, later Mary Godwin (1759–1797), English author of A Vindication of the Rights of Woman
- Mills Godwin (1914–1999), Governor of Virginia
- Richard Godwin (1922–2005), First Under Secretary of Defense for Acquisition, Technology and Logistics
- William Godwin (1756–1836), English political philosopher

=== Religion ===
- Godwin of Stavelot, English saint
- Francis Godwin (1562–1633), English bishop and historian
- Godwin (bishop), bishop of Lichfield c. 1003 – 1017
- Jeff Godwin, American fundamentalist, former rock musician
- Thomas Godwin (bishop) (1517–1590), bishop of Bath and Wells

=== Arts and entertainment ===
- Alfred Godwin (1850-1934), English-born, American stained-glass artist
- Catherine Grace Godwin (1798–1845), Scottish poet
- Edward William Godwin (1833–1886), English architect
- Elizabeth Ayton Godwin (1817–1889), English hymnwriter, religious poet
- Fay Godwin (1931–2005), British photographer
- Frank Godwin (1889–1959), American illustrator, creator of Connie comic strip
- Frank Godwin (film producer) (1917–2012), English film producer
- Gail Godwin (born 1937), American novelist and short story writer
- George Stanley Godwin (1889–1974), English author
- Jack Godwin (1904–1973), English conjurer and magician
- Jeff Godwin, American fundamentalist, former rock musician
- Joscelyn Godwin (born 1945), English musicologist and translator
- Mary Godwin (artist) (1887–1960), British artist
- Mary Shelley (née Mary Wollstonecraft Godwin; 1797–1851), English author of Frankenstein
- Parke Godwin (1929–2013), American writer
- Parke Godwin (journalist) (1816–1904), American journalist
- Paul Godwin (1902–1982), Polish violinist and bandleader
- Peter Godwin (born 1957), Zimbabwean author and journalist
- Peter Godwin (singer), English new wave musician
- Robert Godwin (born 1958), British author
- Stephanie Godwin (1917–2006), English painter and illustrator
- Ted Godwin (1933–2013), Canadian artist
- Tom Godwin (1915–1980), American science fiction author

=== Science ===
- George Godwin (1813–1888), British architect, town planner and journalist
- Harry Godwin (1901–1985), English botanist
- Henry Haversham Godwin-Austen (1834–1923), English geologist and ornithologist
- Linda M. Godwin (born 1952), American astronaut
- Robert Alfred Cloynes Godwin-Austen (1808–1884), English geologist

=== Sport ===
- Billy Godwin (born 1964), American college baseball coach
- Chris Godwin (born 1996), American football player
- Jack Godwin (born 1904), British Olympic rower
- John Godwin (baseball) (1877–1956), American baseball player
- Neville Godwin (born 1975), South African tennis player
- Terry Godwin (born 1996), American football player
- Tommy Godwin (footballer) (1927–1996), Irish footballer
- Tommy Godwin (cyclist, born 1912) (1912–1975), English cyclist and world record holder for miles covered in a year
- Tommy Godwin (cyclist, born 1920) (1920–2012), British track cyclist active during the 1940s and 1950s
- Verdi Godwin (1926–2013), English footballer
- Wayne Godwin (born 1982), English rugby player

=== Military ===
- Captain Abraham Godwin (1724–1777), Captain of Marines on the USS Lady Washington in the American Revolutionary War
- Bill Godwin, Rhodesian brigadier
- Elizabeth Godwin, British army captain and first female officer of The Life Guards
- James Godwin, American admiral
- James Gowing Godwin (1923–1995), New Zealand military aviator
- John Godwin (Royal Navy officer) (1919–1945), British Naval Reserve officer during World War II

=== Other people ===
- Becky Godwin (1954–1968), daughter of Virginia Governor Godwin, killed by lightning
- Glen Stewart Godwin (born 1958), American murderer, former FBI Ten Most Wanted fugitive
- Mike Godwin (born 1956), American lawyer, created Godwin's law of Internet discussions (mentioning Hitler)

== Given name ==
- Godwin Abbe (1949–2024), Nigerian politician
- Godwin Akwaji (died 2020), Nigerian politician
- Godwin Emefiele, Nigerian banker
- Godwin Emeh (born 1969), Nigerian tennis player
- Godwin Igwebuike (born 1994), American football player
- Godwin Olofua, Nigerian badminton player
- Godwin Samararatne, Sri Lankan teacher

== Fictional characters ==
- Neil Godwin, from The Office

== Places ==
- Godwin, North Carolina
- Godwin-Austen Glacier

== Other uses ==
- General Godwin, convict ship
- "Godwin" (song), a song by Nigerian artiste Korede Bello
- Godwin: A Novel, a 2024 book by Joseph O'Neill
- Godwin's law on comparison with Nazis, named after American lawyer Mike Godwin
- Mills E. Godwin High School

== See also ==
- House of Godwin, Anglo-Saxon family
- Goodwin (disambiguation)
- List of Old English (Anglo-Saxon) surnames
