= Daniel Goodwin =

Daniel Goodwin may refer to:

- Dan Goodwin (born 1955), American climber
- D. James Goodwin, American record producer
- Daniel Raynes Goodwin (1811–1890), American clergyman
- Daniel Goodwin (Michigan judge) (1799–1887), Justice of the Michigan Supreme Court
- Danny Goodwin (born 1953), American baseball player
