= Commander-in-Chief's Guard in the American Revolution =

- Active: 1776–1783
- Disbanded: November 15, 1783
- Country: United States
- Branch: Continental Army
- Type: Infantry
- Role: Guard
- Size: Company
- Motto: Conquer or Die
- Facings: Red
- Arms: Brown Bess
- Wars: American Revolutionary War

Commanders
- Captain commandants: Caleb Gibbs (1776–81); William Colfax (1781–83)

The Commander-in-Chief's Guard was an infantry company of the Continental Army that protected General George Washington during the American Revolutionary War. Formed in 1776, the company was with Washington throughout the American Revolution until disbanded in 1783.

== Formation ==
The Commander-in-Chief's Guard was authorized on March 11, 1776, and organized the next day at Cambridge, Massachusetts. The purpose of the unit was to protect General Washington as well as the money and official papers of the Continental Army. Washington directed the formation of a "corps of sober, intelligent, and reliable men". "Despite its impressive unit designation and its important mission," wrote military historian Mark Boatner, the Guard "appears to have been nothing more than what today would be called a headquarters security detachment."

1. General Washington's mounted Bodyguard.; 2. The independent Company, Commander-in-Chief Washington.

The company was initially created by selecting four men from each Continental Army regiment present at the siege of Boston. Washington's general order on March 11 outlined the type of men that he hoped to recruit:

The General being desirous of selecting a particular number of men, as a Guard for himself, and baggage, The Colonel, or commanding Officer, of each of the established Regiments, (the Artillery and Rifflemen excepted) will furnish him with four, that the number wanted may be chosen out of them. His Excellency depends upon the Colonels for good Men, such as they can recommend for their sobriety, honesty, and good behaviour; he wishes them to be from five feet, eight Inches high, to five feet, ten Inches; handsomely and well made, and as there is nothing in his eyes more desirable, than Cleanliness in a Soldier, he desires that particular attention may be made, in the choice of such men, as are neat, and spruce. They are all to be at Head Quarters to morrow precisely at twelve, at noon, when the Number wanted will be fixed upon. The General neither wants men with uniforms, or arms, nor does he desire any man to be sent to him, that is not perfectly willing, and desirous, of being of this guard. They should be drill'd men.

The strength of the company was usually 180 men, although this was temporarily increased to 250 during the winter of 1779–80, when the army was encamped at Morristown, New Jersey in close proximity to the British Army. Because it was an honor to belong to the unit, care was taken to ensure that soldiers from each of the 13 states were represented in the Guard. Major Caleb Gibbs of Rhode Island was the first commander of the Guard, and was given the title of captain commandant. Gibbs was succeeded in 1779 by William Colfax.

Godfrey's 1904 history of The Commander-in-Chief's Guard provides "detailed sketches of its members", including six drummers, six fifers, and a drum-major. In the final days of the war, the unit consisted of only 64 men. It was furloughed June 6, 1783 at Newburgh, New York, and disbanded on November 15, 1783.

== Controversies ==
=== Hickey mutiny ===
Several members of the Commander-in-Chief's Guard were involved in a shadowy conspiracy early in the war. After the conclusion of the Boston campaign in 1776, General Washington and the Continental Army marched to New York City and prepared for an anticipated attempt by the British to occupy the city. New York's Royal Governor William Tryon had been driven out of the city by American Patriots and was compelled to seek refuge on a ship in New York Harbor. Nevertheless, the city had many Loyalists who favored the British side.

In the spring of 1776, Sergeant Thomas Hickey, a member of the Guard, was arrested with another soldier in New York for passing counterfeit money. While incarcerated, Hickey revealed to a prisoner named Isaac Ketcham that he was part of a wider conspiracy of soldiers who were prepared to defect to the British once the expected invasion came. Hickey claimed that eight members of the Guard were involved in the plot. William Greene was one of the conspirators, as a drummer in the Guard, and New York City Mayor David Mathews was accused of funding the operation to bribe soldiers to join the British. The suspected men of the Guard were taken into custody by the provost marshal of the Continental Army.

The conspiracy became greatly exaggerated in rumor, and was alleged to include plans to kidnap Washington, assassinate him and his officers, and blow up the Continental Army's ammunition magazines. Hickey was the only conspirator put on trial; he was court-martialed and found guilty of mutiny and sedition. He was executed in New York on June 28, 1776 before 20,000 spectators.

=== Milliner claim ===
Decades after the Revolution, it was not uncommon for aged veterans to claim to have served in General Washington's Life Guard. One of the more famous of the false claims was made by Alexander Milliner of New York, who was interviewed in 1864 by the Reverend Elias B. Hillard for his book The Last Men of the Revolution. Milliner claimed to be 104 and spun several stories of his (imagined) encounters with the general and "Lady Washington" during the last years of the Revolution. Later investigations determined that Milliner was only 94 (b. 1770) when he reminisced for Hillard. He had indeed served for several years as a drummer boy, but he did so in the New York Line and there was no record of a "Milliner" in the Life Guard.

== See also ==
- List of Continental Army units (1776)
- List of Continental Army units (1777–1784)
