= Goodwin =

Goodwin may refer to:

== Names ==
- Goodwin (surname), people with the surname
- Goody Rosen (born Goodwin Rosen; 1912–1994), Canadian Major League Baseball All Star outfielder
- Goodwin Liu (born 1970), American lawyer and politician
- Goodwin Knight (1896–1970), American politician, 31st Governor of California
- Goodwin Tutum Anim, Ghanaian journalist

== Places ==
- Goodwin, Alberta, a locality in Canada
- Goodwin Island, Nunavut, Canada
- Goodwin's (Station), now Brookhaven, Georgia, United States
- Goodwin, Nebraska, United States
- Goodwin Sands, a sandbank in the English Channel
- Goodwin, South Dakota, United States
- Goodwin, West Virginia, United States
- Lake Goodwin, Washington, United States
- Goodwins, the original name of the Yorkshire Trading Company, United Kingdom

== Other uses ==
- Goodwin & Company, a tobacco manufacturer
- Goodwin College, East Hartford, Connecticut
- Goodwin Field, a stadium in Fullerton, California
- Goodwin Fire, a major wildfire that burned 20,000+ acres near Mayer, Arizona
- Goodwin Heart Pine, a reclaimed wood flooring manufacturer
- Goodwin Procter, LLP, an American law firm
- Goodwin Sports Centre, a sports facility in Sheffield, England

== See also ==
- Godwin (disambiguation)
- Justice Goodwin (disambiguation)
