= Matt Goodwin (disambiguation) =

Matt Goodwin (born 1981) is a British political commentator.

Matt Goodwin may also refer to:

- Matt Goodwin (rugby league) (born 1960), Australian rugby league footballer
- Matt Goodwin (Canadian football) (born 1970), American gridiron football player

== See also ==
- Goodwin (surname)
- Goodwin (disambiguation)
