= Wood flooring =

Product manufactured from timber that is designed for use as flooring

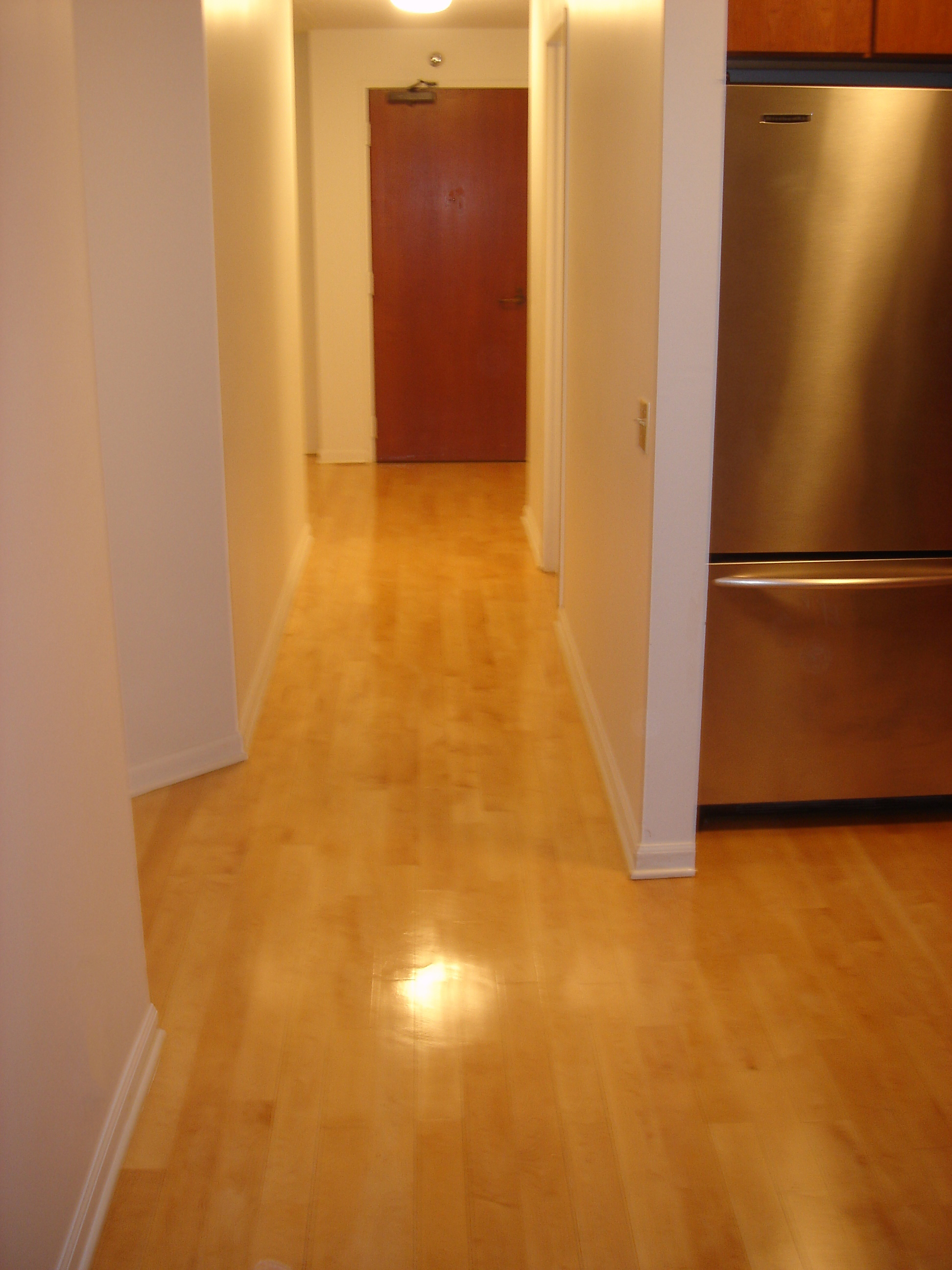
An example of solid wood flooring with a top coating of polyurethane

Wood flooring is any product manufactured from timber that is designed for use as flooring, either structural or aesthetic. Wood is a common choice as a flooring material and can come in various styles, colors, cuts, and species. Bamboo flooring is often considered a form of wood flooring, although it is made from bamboo rather than timber.

== Types ==
=== Solid ===
==== Hardwood flooring ====
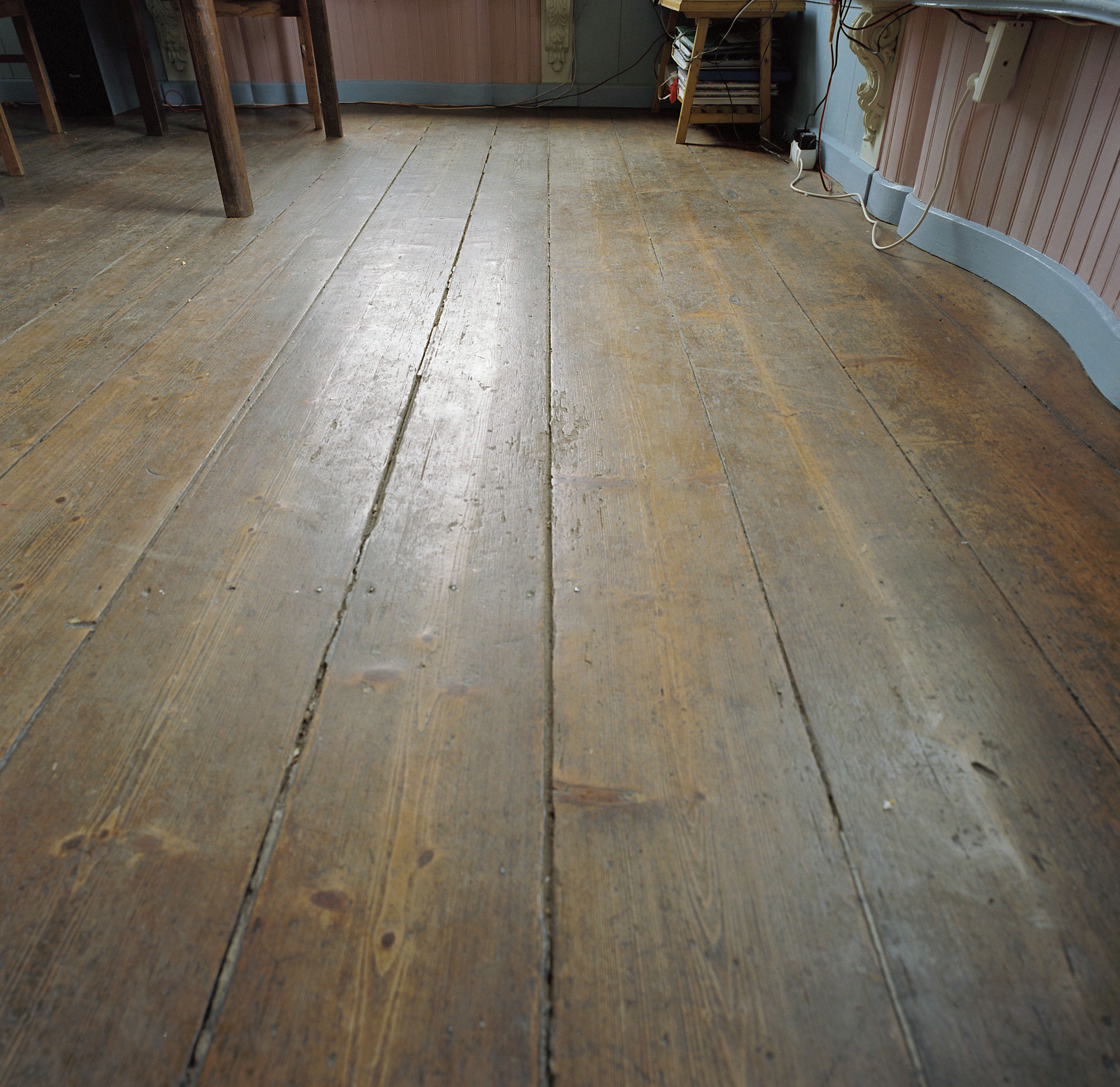
Hardwood flooring

Solid hardwood floors are made of planks milled from a single piece of timber. Solid hardwood floors were originally used for structural purposes, being installed perpendicular to the wooden support beams of a building known as joists or bearers. With the increased use of concrete as a subfloor in some parts of the world, engineered wood flooring has gained some popularity. However, solid wood floors are still common and popular, but are commonly more expensive in the United States and considered higher end. Solid wood floors have a thicker wear surface and can be sanded and finished more times than an engineered wood floor. It is not uncommon for homes in New England, Eastern Canada, USA, and Europe to have the original solid wood floor still in use today.

==== Solid wood manufacturing ====
Solid wood flooring is milled from a single piece of timber that is kiln or air dried before sawing. Depending on the desired look of the floor, the timber can be cut in three ways: flat-sawn, quarter-sawn, and rift-sawn. The timber is cut to the desired dimensions and either packed unfinished for a site-finished installation or finished at the factory. The moisture content at time of manufacturing is carefully controlled to ensure the product does not warp during transport and storage.

A number of proprietary features for solid wood floors are available. Many solid woods come with grooves cut into the back of the wood that run the length of each plank, often called 'absorption strips,' that are intended to reduce cupping. Solid wood floors are mostly manufactured 0.75 inches (19 mm) thick with a tongue-and-groove for installation.

===== Other wood manufacturing styles =====
====== Rotary-peel ======
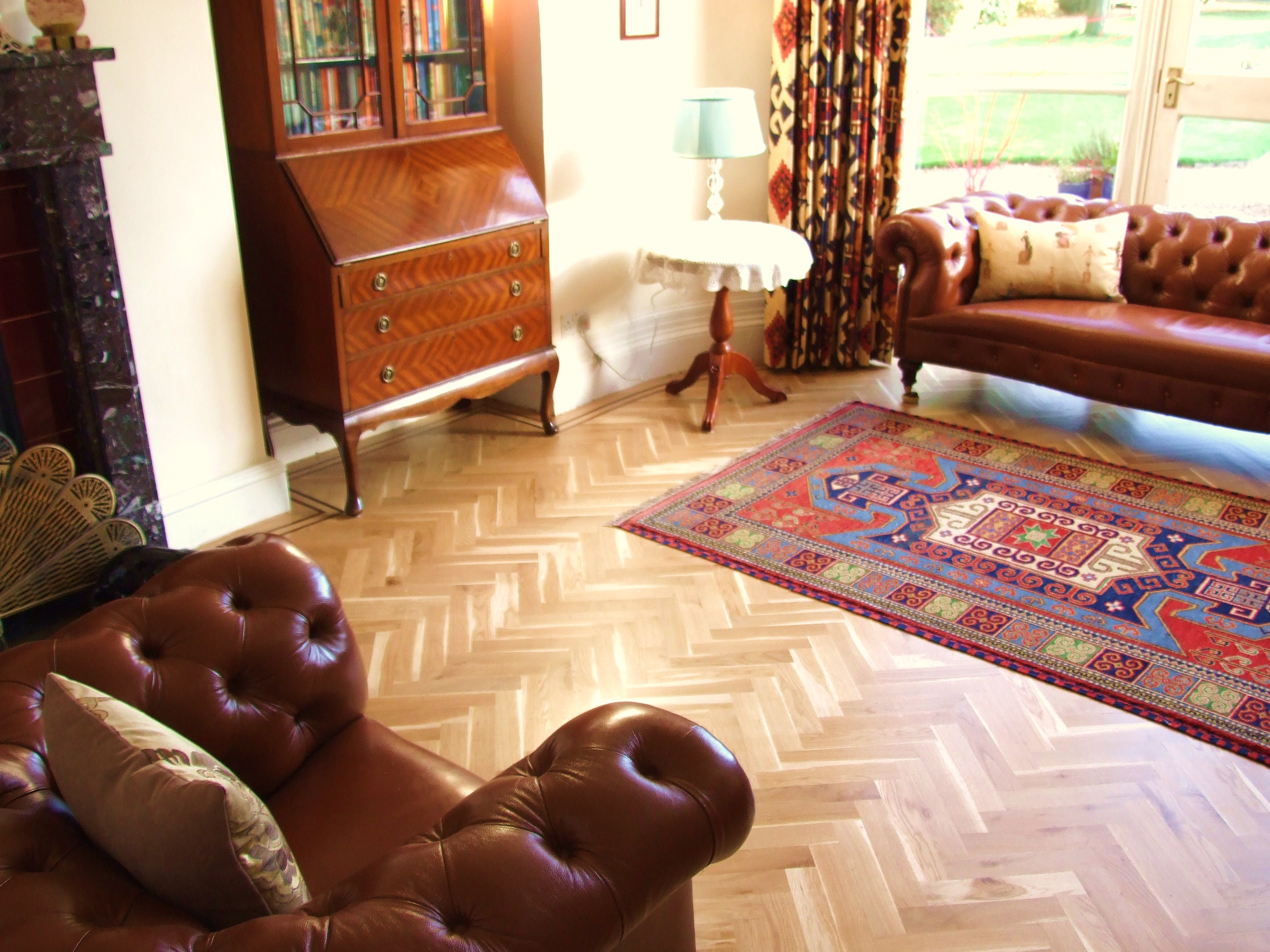
Oak herringbone parquet floor with two-strip wenge border

This process involves treating the wood by boiling the log in water. After preparation, the wood is peeled by a blade starting from the outside of the log and working toward the center, thus creating a wood veneer. The veneer is then pressed flat with high pressure. This style of manufacturing tends to have problems with the wood cupping or curling back to its original shape. Rotary-peeled engineered hardwoods tend to have a plywood appearance in the grain.

====== Sliced-peel ======
This process begins with the same treatment process that the rotary peel method uses. However, instead of being sliced in a rotary fashion, with this technique the wood is sliced from the log in much the same manner that lumber is sawn from a log – straight through. The veneers do not go through the same manufacturing process as rotary peeled veneers. Engineered hardwood produced this way tends to have fewer problems with "face checking", and also does not have the same plywood appearance in the grain.

====== Dry solid-sawn ======
Instead of boiling the hardwood logs, in this methods they are kept at a low humidity level and dried slowly to draw moisture from the inside of the wood cells. The logs are then sawn in the same manner as for solid hardwood planks. This style of engineered hardwood has the same look as solid hardwood, and does not have any of the potential problems of "face checking" that rotary-peel and slice-peel products have, because the product is not exposed to added moisture

=== Engineered ===
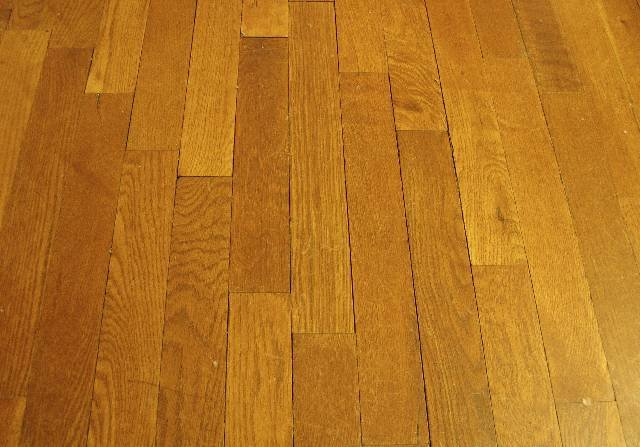
Wood flooring is a popular feature in many houses.

Engineered wood flooring consists of two or more layers of wood adhered together to form a plank. Typically, engineered wood flooring uses a thin layer (lamella) of a more expensive wood bonded to a core constructed from cheaper wood. The increased stability of engineered wood is achieved by running each layer at a 90° angle to the layer above. This stability makes it a universal product that can be installed over all types of subfloors above, below or on grade. Engineered wood is the most common type of wood flooring in Europe and has been growing in popularity in North America.

Laminate and vinyl floors are often confused with engineered wood floors, but are not. Laminate flooring uses an image of wood on its surface, while vinyl flooring is plastic formed to look like wood.

The several different categories of engineered wood flooring include:

- All-timber-wood floors made from multiple layers of sawn wood. Most engineered wood flooring is in this category, and does not use rotary-peeled veneer, composite wood (such as HDF), or plastic in their construction.
- Veneer floors use a thin layer of wood over a core that is commonly a composite wood product.
- Acrylic-impregnated wood flooring uses a layer of wood that is impregnated with liquid acrylic then hardened using a proprietary process.
- Birch plywood is commonly used as the substrate in engineered flooring due to its strength, durability, and waterproof properties. It is composed of several thin layers of birch veneer core glued together. It is well-suited for commercial vehicle flooring and trailer decking for its flexibility and ability to endure heavy foot traffic.

== Comparison of solid wood with engineered wood ==
It is difficult to compare solid wood flooring to engineered wood flooring due to the wide range of quality in both product categories and each type has its limitations. Solid hardwood is more prone than engineered timber to "gapping" (excessive space between planks), "crowning" (convex curving upwards when humidity increases) and "cupping" (a concave or "dished" appearance of the plank, with the height of the plank along its longer edges being higher than the centre) with increased plank size. Patented installation systems for engineered wood may allow for faster installation and easy replacement of boards. Engineered wood also allows for a floating installation where the planks are not fastened to the subfloor, but to each other. Engineered flooring is suitable for underfloor and radiant heating systems, while solid wood should not be used with underfloor heating.

Some characteristics are common to each category: solid wood is more frequently site-finished, is always in a plank format, is generally thicker than engineered wood, and is installed by nailing. Engineered wood is more frequently pre-finished, is very rarely site-finished and is installed by staple down or floating installation.

== Installation systems ==
Wood can be manufactured with a variety of different installation systems:

1. Tongue-and-groove: One side and one end of the plank have a groove, the other side and end have a tongue (protruding wood along an edge's center). The tongue and groove fit snugly together, thus joining or aligning the planks, and are not visible once joined. Tongue-and-groove flooring can be installed by glue-down (both engineered and solid), floating (engineered only), or nail-down (both solid and engineered).
2. "Click" or Woodloc systems: a number of patented "click" systems now exist. These click systems are either "unilin" or "fiboloc". A "click" floor is similar to tongue-and-groove, but instead of fitting directly into the groove, the board must be angled or "tapped" in to make the curved or barbed tongue fit into the modified groove. No adhesive is used when installing a "click" floor, making board replacement easier. This system not only exists for engineered wood floors but also engineered bamboo and a small number of solid floors (such as "parador solido click") and is designed to be used for floating installations. It is beneficial for the do-it-yourself market.
3. Floor connection system: A wide range of connection systems exist, as most of them are mill-specific manufacturing techniques. The general principle is to have grooves on all four sides of the plank with a separate, unconnected, piece that is inserted into the grooves of two planks to join them. The piece used for the connection can be made from wood, rubber, or plastic. This installation system allows for different materials (i.e. wood and metal) to be installed together if they have the same connection system.
4. Wood flooring can also be installed utilizing the glue-down method. This is an especially popular method for solid parquet flooring installations on concrete sub-floors. Additionally, engineered wood flooring may use the glue-down method as well. A layer of mastic is placed onto the sub-floor using a trowel similar to those used in laying ceramic tile. The wood pieces are then laid on top of the glue and hammered into place using a rubber mallet and a protected 2x4 to create a level floor. Traditionally, parquet floors will require sanding and re-finishing after the glue-down installation method due to the small size pieces. However, most new engineered parquet blocks don't require this extra step.
5. Floating installation: A floating installation is where the flooring is installed on top of a layer of underlayment or moisture barrier. The individual planks are glued together using a tongue and groove adhesive such as PVA wood glue. Space for expansion should be left at the edges of the room. Cabinets and walls should not be installed on top of floating floors. Subfloors should be flat and it is not recommended to install on top of more than one layer of existing flooring.
6. Another installation method, secret nailing, offers similar benefits to the glue-down or fully bonded method for boards of at least 18mm. Thinner boards may require a glue-down or floating installation instead.

== Finishing, buffing, sanding and drying ==
=== Floor finishes ===
1. Polyurethane – Polyurethane floor finishes were first introduced around 1942. Water-based urethane is harder than oil-modified polyurethane and is much safer for the user. Within both categories there are many variations and other names used to describe the finish. They have very different refinishing and maintenance requirements.
2. Natural shellacs, lacquers, and varnishes were used in the past, as were waxes, often blended with oils.
3. Oil – Oiled floors have existed for several thousand years and oil is the most common floor finish used globally. Oils used for floor finishing are natural drying oils of vegetable origin that are not to be confused with petroleum based oils and contain no VOCs. Pre-finished oil floors can be UV cured.
4. Brushed and oiled – Steel brushes are used in the direction of the grain which opens up the surface of the wood and removes splinters. The wood is then oiled.

=== Buffing ===
Generally, older solid hardwood floors need to be buffed every 3–5 years. The process usually takes about one day. Buffing refers to the process of using a stand up floor buffer. The floor is abraded with 180 grit screen on the buffer. This allows for the new coat of finish to mechanically adhere to the floor. This process works with great results as long as the floor hasn't had any waxes or synthetic cleaners. Factory finished floors do not require buffing.

=== Refinishing ===
Refinishing is sanding the finish off old wood floors and smoothing them out. In most cases, only as little as 1/32-inch of wood is needed for refinishing. Hardwood floors specifically are known for their longevity, so it can be challenging to determine when they need to be refinished. Typically, floors that are more than 10 years old will need refinishing. Though, other signs the wood needs work include: visible scratches and nicks, a dull finish, and uneven coloring.

=== Floor sanding ===
Sanding provides a method for smoothing an installed floor, compensating for unevenness of the subfloor. Additionally, sanding is used to renew the appearance of older floors. Sanding using successively finer grades of sandpaper is required to ensure even stain penetration when stains are used, as well as to eliminate visible scratches from coarser sandpaper grades used initially. Prior to modern polyurethanes, oils and waxes were used in addition to stains to provide finishes. Beeswax and linseed oil, for example, are both natural crosslinking polymers and harden over time.

=== Floor scraping ===
Prior to the 20th century, hardwood floors were refinished by scraping. This process revealed undamaged wood but left many shallow gouges in the floor. Scraping may be performed using such tools as chisels, planes, and cabinet scrapers. Modern methods duplicate this using proprietary machinery.

== See also ==
- Parquetry
- Reclaimed lumber
- Reclaimed Wood Council
