= Goodwin Heart Pine =

Florida, USA company

Goodwin Heart Pine Company
- Type: Corporation
- Industry: Manufacturing building materials
- Founded: 1976
- Founder: George Goodwin
- Headquarters: Tampa, Florida, United States
- Area served: United States
- Key people: Branden Pastilong (President); Kurt Plum (CEO)
- Products: Reclaimed wood, including river-recovered Heart Pine, river-recovered Cypress, reclaimed Heart Pine and sustainable Lumber
- Owner: Branden Pastilong
- Number of employees: 11–50 employees
- Parent: North Rome Lumber
- Website: www.heartpine.com

Goodwin Heart Pine is a company located in Tampa, Florida. It specializes in reclaiming antique heart pine and heart cypress from rivers and old buildings to produce lumber for flooring, stair parts and millwork. Goodwin's product range also includes other sustainable and rare woods, including wild black cherry. Goodwin Heart Pine also produces precision-engineered wood flooring from these specialty woods. The company has a focus of harvesting resin-saturated deadhead logs from rivers that loggers felled in the 1800s, which sank due to their high resin content. The interior of the reclaimed logs is typically preserved by the tree's resin.

== History ==
In 1976, George Goodwin began as a master carpenter and home builder. After a diver friend gave him antique long leaf pine logs found in the Suwannee River for his own project, the idea to reclaim logs from rivers was expanded into a sawmill operation in Micanopy, Florida. The company became incorporated in Florida in 1984. In 2002 it received Federal Trademark registration for "River-Recovered" from the US Patent & Trademark Office. In 2003, George and Carol Goodwin created the Reclaimed Wood Council, which was formed to educate buyers and set standards for reputable manufacturers of reclaimed woods. In 2007 the company introduced Precision Engineered wood flooring (PE), manufactured using reclaimed and sustainable woods. In 2025, North Rome Lumber announced the acquisition of Goodwin Company Brand and the Heartpine.com Legacy.

== Products and services ==
Goodwin Heart Pine's specialties include antique river-recovered heart pine and heart cypress, antique heart pine, wild black cherry and precision-engineered wood, flooring, stair parts and millwork.

The company provides both river-recovered and other sustainable kiln-dried wood flooring, stair millings and lumber that meets the Florida Green Building Coalition and Leadership in Environmental and Engineering Design (LEED) standards.

== Awards and recognition ==
Goodwin Heart Pine has gained national recognition by providing the wood used for The National Wood Flooring Association's Floor of the Year in the following years:

- 1997, 1999, 2000, 2002, 2009, 2010: Floor of the Year, National Wood Flooring Association designed by DM Hardwood Designs.
- 2008 Floor of the Year, National Wood Flooring Association designed by Goodwin Heart Pine Company.
- 2011 Floor of the Year, National Wood Flooring Association designed by Precision Floorcrafters.
