= George Hand =

George Hand may refer to:

- George Edward Hand (1809–1889), American state legislator
- George Hand (bishop) (died 1945), colonial Anglican bishop of Antigua
- George David Hand (bishop) (1918–2006), Australian Anglican bishop, Archbishop of Papua New Guinea
