= Abraham Godwin Jr. =

American politician

Abraham Godwin
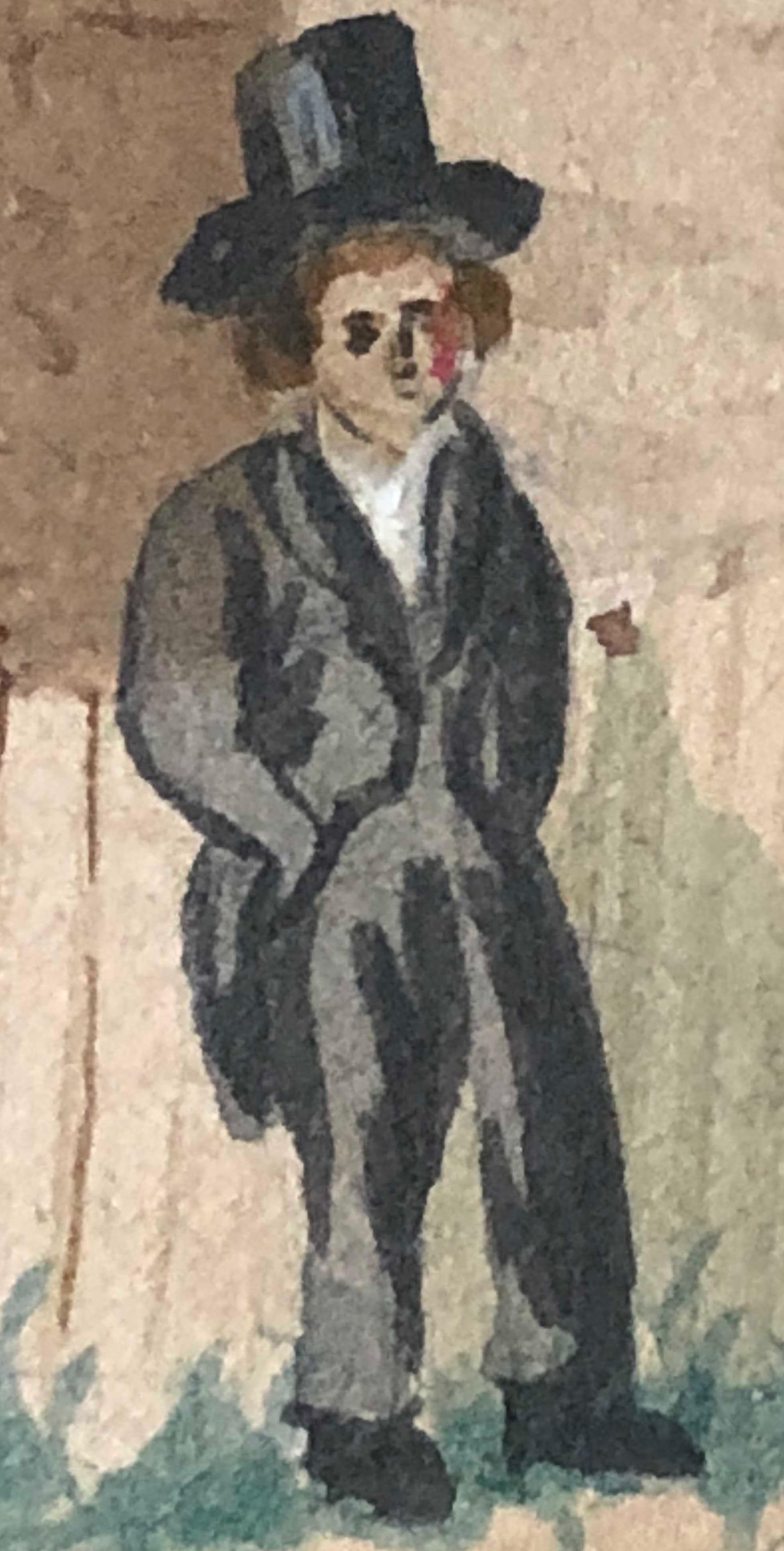

Postmaster of Paterson, New Jersey
- In office 1816 – 1829, 1849
- Preceded by: Henry Godwin

New Jersey State Legislature
- In office 1821–1832

Personal details
- Born: Abraham Godwin; July 14, 1791 Morristown, New Jersey, U.S.
- Died: August 18, 1849 (aged 58) Paterson, New Jersey, U.S.
- Spouse: Martha Parke
- Children: 6

Abraham Godwin Jr. (July 14, 1791 – August 18, 1849) was the first Lieutenant of the expedition to Canada in 1812 led by Generals Brown and Izard. He later rose to the rank of Brigadier General in the New Jersey state militia. In 1816, when his eldest brother Henry committed suicide, he became Postmaster of Paterson, a position he would hold until 1829 and briefly again before his death in 1849. In 1821, he was elected to the New Jersey General Assembly, serving until 1832. In November 1840, Abraham delivered New Jersey electoral votes to Washington, D.C. for that year's presidential election.

== Personal life ==
He is the son of Abraham Godwin, grandson of Captain Abraham Godwin, husband of Martha Parke, and father of three sons. His eldest was famous Parke Godwin, his second son Henry was a lawyer in Binghamton, New York, and disappeared in the Civil War, and the youngest son Abraham, was a house painter, captured at the Battle of the Wilderness and died a prisoner of the Confederacy in Andersonville, Georgia. At the Godwin Hotel on the Passaic in 1828 he created Passaic County. He was elected as an officer for the State of New Jersey at the New York Convention on October 26, 1831. He lived in the house his grandfather built and his grandmother Phebe turned into a Tavern known as the 'Widow Godwin Tavern', right down the street from the Passaic Hotel/Godwin Tavern. An old resident of Paterson recalls back to their youth about their memories of Abraham as the Postmaster:

It was a very fine coach, hung on straps, and comfortable to ride in. It had room inside for nine, and two more passengers could be accommodated on top. A rack for trunks and packages was fixed behind. it bowled along the turnpike drawn by four speedy horses. this was all before the railroads came.

The driver was a man of pleasant address, and well thought of by all. How proud we boys were to grab up the mail bag when he threw it down in front of the tavern and run with it across to the postoffice, where its contents were emptied and sorted. He always promised us something when he came up the next time. After the pouch, the only one carried, and still containing mail for other villages, had been returned to him, and he had watered his horses, and rested and warmed himself, the stage was off. Its going left the village corners again quiet for a day or two.

He made an interesting picture, his genial stage-driver, with his high beaver hat surmounting his cherry read face, and his great muffler and brown overcoat. Strange to say, he died of consumption some years later, brought on by long exposure to severe and treacherous weather. I remember his being helped down from the seat one winter's day, when the thermometer was said to have been eighteen below.

He commanded the martial music at his father's funeral and Revolutionary War hero William Colfax's funeral in 1838. He inherited his father's epaulets. In 1820, Abraham became partners with Thomas Rogers and went into business running a cotton mill. They leased several mills over the years and worked together until 1830 when Thomas Rogers decided to go on his own. Soon after, he founded the Rogers Locomotive and Machine Works. On 2 March 1831, books to receive stock in the "Paterson and Hudson River Valley Railroad Company" were commissioned by Abraham at the Godwin Hotel, which was being run by Abraham's sister Maria and her husband Henry Post. This railroad would go on to split Godwin Avenue in two, creating Godwin Street.

== Death ==
Abraham died in the Widow Godwin Tavern on August 18, 1849, from tuberculosis, and was buried in Cedar Lawn Cemetery in Paterson, New Jersey. He and his wife's gravestones were tipped over. Abraham's was split in half. In 2017, the stones were returned upright and fixed with cement.
