= Justice Goodwin =

Justice Goodwin or Justice Goodwyn may refer to:

- Alfred Goodwin (1923–2022), associate justice of the Supreme Court of Oregon
- Daniel Goodwin (Michigan judge) (1799–1887), associate justice of the Michigan Supreme Court
- John L. Goodwyn (1903–1968), associate justice of the Alabama Supreme Court
- S. Bernard Goodwyn (born 1961), chief justice of the Supreme Court of Virginia

== See also ==
- Judge Goodwin (disambiguation)
