= Judge Goodwin =

Judge Goodwin may refer to:

- Alfred Goodwin (1923–2022), judge of the United States Court of Appeals for the Ninth Circuit
- Charles Barnes Goodwin (born 1970), judge of the United States District Court for the Western District of Oklahoma
- Charles Wycliffe Goodwin (1817–1878), assistant judge and acting chief judge of the British Supreme Court for China and Japan
- Joseph R. Goodwin (born 1942), judge of the United States District Court for the Southern District of West Virginia
- William Nelson Goodwin (1909–1975), judge of the United States District Courts for the Eastern and Western Districts of Washington

== See also ==
- Justice Goodwin (disambiguation)
