= Caleb Gibbs =

Continental Army officer (1748–1818)

- Born: February 28, 1748; Newport, Rhode Island
- Died: November 6, 1818 (aged 70); Charlestown, Massachusetts, U.S.
- Spouse: Catherine Hall (m. 1787)
- Military career
- Allegiance: United States
- Branch: Continental Army
- Service years: 1776–1784
- Rank: Brevet Lieutenant Colonel
- Units: 14th Continental Regiment; 2d Massachusetts Regiment; Jackson's Continental Regiment
- Commands: Commander-in-Chief's Guard
- Battles: American Revolutionary War; Siege of Yorktown

Caleb Gibbs (February 28, 1748–November 6, 1818) was a Continental Army officer who served as captain commandant of the Commander-in-Chief's Guard from 1776 to 1781.

== Early life and military career ==
Gibbs was born on February 28, 1748, in Newport, Rhode Island. He took up residence in Marblehead, Massachusetts. During the American Revolutionary War, Gibbs was appointed as the adjutant of the 14th Continental Regiment, commanded by Colonel John Glover of Marblehead, on January 1, 1776. On 12 March 1776, General Washington appointed Captain Gibbs as the commander of the Commander-in-Chief's Guard, with the title of Captain Commandant. Five years later, in 1781, Gibbs was succeeded as commander by William Colfax. During his command of Washington's "Life Guard" Gibbs was promoted to the rank of Major on July 29, 1778. On January 1, 1781 Gibbs was reassigned to the 2d Massachusetts Regiment. On October 14, 1781 he fought at the Siege of Yorktown where he was wounded in action. Gibbs was brevetted to the rank of Lieutenant Colonel on September 30, 1783.

In November 1783, following the British evacuation of New York, the 2nd Massachusetts was disbanded. Gibbs was retained in Jackson's Continental Regiment, commanded by Colonel Henry Jackson, the only infantry regiment remaining in the Continental Army. Gibbs was discharged from the Continental Army on June 20, 1784 when Jackson's Regiment was disbanded.

== Later life and death ==
In 1798 Gibbs was recommended by retired Major General Henry Knox for command of a regiment when the United States Army was expanded during the Quasi-War with France. Knox said of Gibbs, "No officer of the late American army would discipline and command a regiment with greater effect." On November 6, 1818, Gibbs died in Charlestown, Massachusetts.

== Personal life ==
In 1783, Gibbs became an Original Member of the Massachusetts Society of the Cincinnati. In January 1787, Gibbs married Catherine Hall, the daughter of James Hall of Boston. They had a daughter named Catherine N. Gibbs who married J. C. Park.
