= William Godwin (disambiguation) =

William Godwin was a British political philosopher, novelist, and journalist.

William Godwin is also the name of:

- William Godwin the Younger (1803–1832), English writer
- William Godwin (MP) (died 1557), English politician
- William Godwin (sport shooter) (1912–2000), British Olympic shooter
- Billy Godwin (born 1964), American baseball coach

== See also ==
- William Godwin (biography), 1984 biography of the philosopher by Peter Marshall
- Edward William Godwin (1833–1886), English architect-designer
- William Goodwin (disambiguation)
