= Society for Establishing Useful Manufactures =

1791 corporation to promote industry

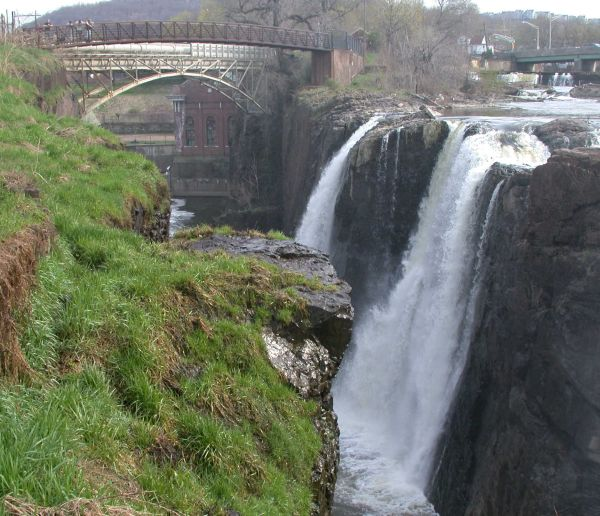
The Great Falls of the Passaic River, showing the turbine housing of the S.U.M. dating from 1911

The Society for Establishing Useful Manufactures (S.U.M.) or Society for the Establishment of Useful Manufactures was a private state-sponsored corporation founded in 1791 to promote industrial development along the Passaic River in New Jersey in the United States. The company's management of the Great Falls of the Passaic River as a powersource for grist mills resulted in the growth of Paterson as one of the first industrial centers in the United States. Under the society's long-term management of the falls, the industrialization of the area passed through three great waves, centered first on cotton, then steel, and finally silk, over the course of over 150 years. The venture is considered by historians to have been a forerunner for many public–private partnerships in later decades in the United States.

== History ==
=== Alexander Hamilton's vision ===
The society was the brainchild of United States Assistant Secretary of the Treasury Tench Coxe, who convinced United States Secretary of the Treasury Alexander Hamilton to support the creation of a quasi-public manufacturing town. Hamilton, who had visited the Great Falls of the Passaic River in 1778, envisioned it as a planned industrial site, using the waterfall as source of mechanical power. The society was chartered by New Jersey under Hamilton's direction to exploit the falls for this planned city, which Hamilton called a "national manufactory". The enterprise was exempt from property taxes for ten years. The society founded the city of Paterson in the vicinity of the falls, naming it in honor of William Paterson, the governor of New Jersey. Hamilton commissioned civil engineer Pierre Charles L'Enfant, responsible for the layout of the new capital at Washington, D.C. to design the system of canals known as raceways supplying the power for the watermills in the new town.

The chartering of the company as a state-favored enterprise, exempt from certain taxes, became the prototype for such public-private enterprises in the 19th century. Contemporaries such as George Logan criticized the SUM for these privileges, as well as for importing what they saw as the stratified class relations and economic dependence of the Old World.

=== Shift in strategy ===
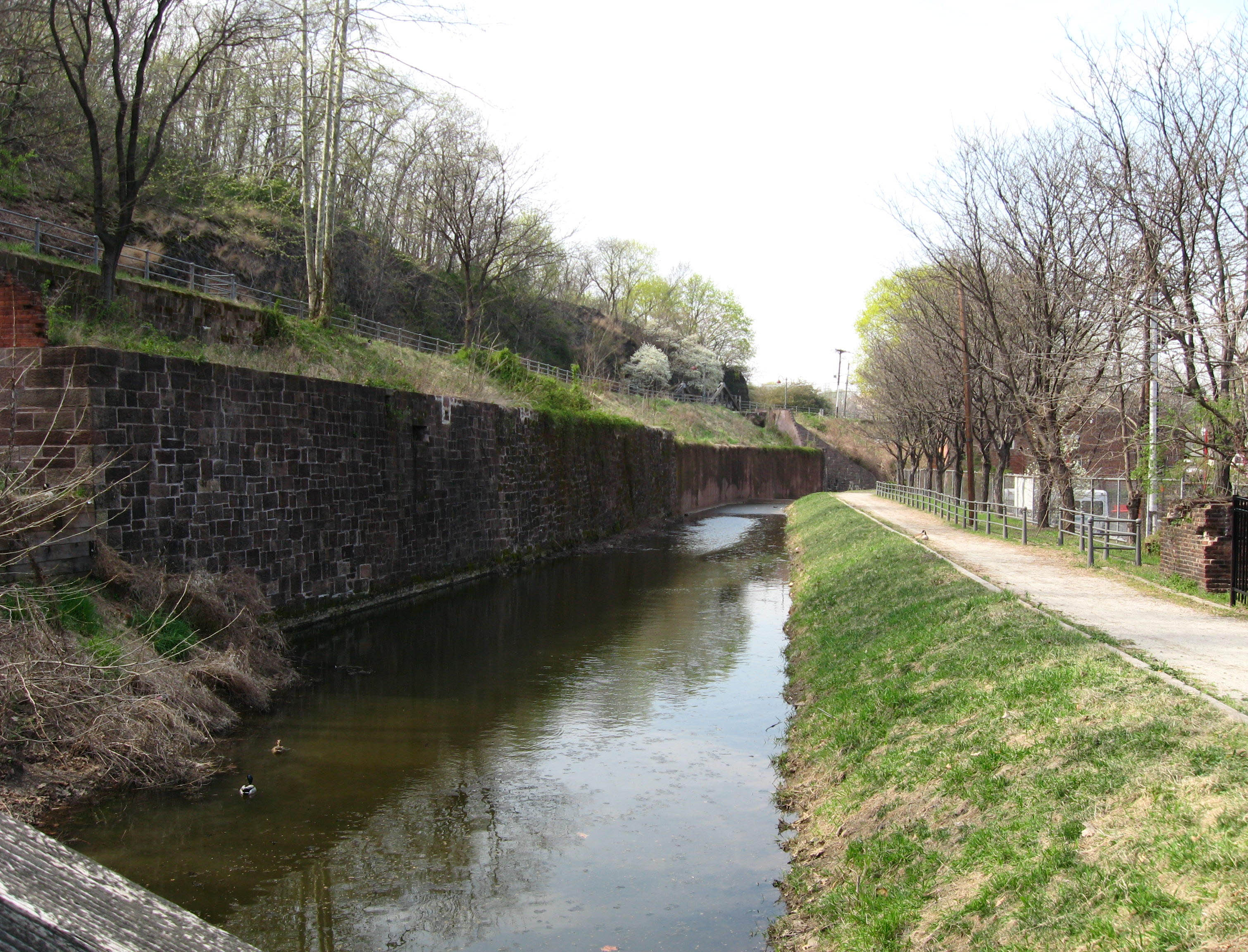
Middle mill race of three. Top race is at left

By 1796, the society's efforts to build its own mills had failed, largely because the slow profits it generated were not enough to cover its start-up costs. In 1791 the Society had brought in one Thomas Marshall, who claimed to have been superintendent of the Masson Mill in England, to take charge. However it would seem that he was unsuccessful. Nevertheless, the society successfully promoted real estate development in the area, leasing sites to other private ventures to establish their own mills while maintaining control of the falls as a power source through ownership of the dams and raceways that supplied the mills. The company's management of the falls subsequently became a lucrative source of profits as the area became the nucleus for a burgeoning mill industry. By 1815, thirteen water-powered cotton mills were operating beside the falls, operated by over 2,000 workers. As a result of the society's success in promoting industry, the population of Paterson grew from 500 in the 1790s to over 5,000 by 1820.

In 1830, the society was involved in a dispute with the recently formed Morris Canal and Banking Company, which had been chartered to build a canal connecting the Passaic River to the Delaware River. The Morris Canal Company had placed a dam on the Rockaway River and diverted water for its own purposes, thus reducing the volume of flow over the falls and threatening the society's ventures. The subsequent court decision allowed the Morris Canal to be built without disrupting the water supply to the falls.

The company's harnessing of the falls for mill operations was described in 1834 by publisher Thomas Gordon who wrote in the Gazetteer of the State of New Jersey:

A dam of 4 1/2 feet high, strongly framed and bolted into the rock in the bed of the river above the falls, turns the stream through a canal excavated in the traprock of the bank, into a basin; whence, through strong guardgates, it supplies in succession three canals on separate planes, each below the other; giving to the mills on each, a head and fall of about 22 feet. By means of the guardgate, the volume of water is regulated at pleasure, and uniform height preserved...The expense of maintaining the dam, canals, and main sluicegates, and of regulating the water, is borne by the company.

=== Evolution of local industry ===
During the 19th century, the success of mill operations attracted many immigrants experienced in mill operations from England, Scotland, Ireland and other areas of Europe. Some artisans brought with them illegal copies of British mill operations which were subsequently duplicated in Paterson.

By the 1830s, the textile mill industry in the area had been surpassed by larger and better-capitalized steam-powered operations in New England. As a result, the local mill industry shifted toward the manufacture of steel and locomotives. The Rogers Locomotive and Machine Works, which began operating in 1832, was the first such success. By the time of the American Civil War, the milling of steel and the manufacture of locomotives had become the dominant industry. In the 1880s, the area became the center of the nation's silk industry.

The society continued operations into the 20th century but fell into decline with the abandonment of the area by industry. In 1945, the society's charter and property were acquired by the city of Paterson.

== See also ==
- Bibliography of Alexander Hamilton
- Technological and industrial history of the United States
- Holyoke Canal System, using similar multi-level mill races
- Abraham Godwin
