= Francis Goodwin =

Francis Goodwin may refer to:

- Francis Goodwin (architect) (1784–1835), English architect
- Francis Goodwin (MP) (1564–1634), English politician
- Francis Goodwin (cricketer) (1866–1931), English cricketer

== See also ==
- Francis Godwin (1562–1633), an English historian, author, and bishop
