= William Colfax =

American politician

- Colfax in uniform, c. 1783

Personal details
- Born: July 3, 1756 New London, Connecticut
- Died: September 9, 1838 (aged 82) Passaic County, New Jersey, U.S.
- Resting place: Colfax Family Burying Ground, Wayne, New Jersey, U.S.
- Spouse: Hester Schuyler (m. 1783)
- Relatives: Schuyler Colfax (grandson)

Military service
- Allegiance: United States
- Branch: Continental Army; New Jersey Militia
- Years of service: 1775–1783; 1812–1815
- Rank: Captain (U.S.); Brigadier General (N.J.)
- Commands: Commander-in-Chief's Guard
- Battles: American Revolutionary War; Battle of Bunker Hill; Battle of White Plains (WIA); Siege of Yorktown; War of 1812

William Colfax (July 3, 1756 – September 9, 1838) was an American politician who served as captain commandant of the Commander-in-Chief's Guard from 1781 to 1783. He also served as a senior officer of New Jersey Militia in the War of 1812.

== Military service ==
=== Connecticut Line ===
When Colfax was 17 years old, he was commissioned as a lieutenant in the Continental Army leading him to be present at the Battle of Bunker Hill in 1775. Colfax was wounded three times in battle during the war, one of those times was at the Battle of White Plains in October 1776. Another was on July 3, 1781, four miles from Valentine's Hill north of New York City near Kingsbridge. Upon one occasion, when he was in the act of giving the word of command to his men, a bullet struck his uplifted sword, shattering the blade, and glancing, skinned one of his fingers. On another occasion, also while riding on horseback in an exposed position a bullet was sent through his body, just above the hip and below the bowels, entering in front and coming out behind. The long buff waistcoat he wore at the time is preserved by his grandchildren, and the hole is apparent, made by the almost fatal shot.

In the excitement of the battle the Colfax did not notice the wound, but still galloped from point to point over the field delivering orders. Some Hessian soldiers, who had been taken prisoners, saw the blood streaming from his side and into his boot, and gleefully exclaimed, "Mein Gott! de Captain is wounded again." As he kept on in the fight some of his own men saw the blood flow and cried to him, "Captain! the blood is running out of your boot!" Looking down, he noticed his condition for the first time and recognized that it must be serious, and rode over toward the field hospital. Dr. Ledyard looked at the wound and bade him go at once into the hospital, and stay in, the latter order being needed to keep Colfax indoors. The excitement over, the wounded Colfax succumbed to the loss of blood and grew faint and weak as a child. After hurriedly examining and dressing the injury, Dr. Ledyard subsequently asked, "Do you want to be cured quickly, or to let this thing linger along?" To which the Captain replied, "As quickly as possible." The surgeon promptly applied the bistouri, tore the wound open and dressed it, whereupon it soon healed. However, recovery was attended by an eruption of boils, covering Colfax from head to heels. Washington, seeing the state of his captain, told him, "You are in a deplorable condition; I will give you a furlough that you may go home till you recover." Colfax persisted in staying with the army till they went into winter quarters at Morristown, in the winter of 1779–1780. During that season he went home to Connecticut on horseback through snow in March so deep that he rode over the fence-tops. He returned greatly improved in health, and was with the army till the close of the war.

=== Commander-in-Chief's Guard ===
While the American army was encamped at Valley Forge, Washington issued an order, dated March 17, 1778, directing that "one hundred chosen men are to be annexed to the Guard of the Commander in-Chief, for the purpose of forming a corps, to be instructed in the manoeuvres necessary to be introduced into the Army, and to serve as a model for the execution of them." Colfax succeeded Caleb Gibbs on January 1, 1781, as captain (by Washington's appointment) of his Life Guard until September 5, 1783, having gone on furlough in July. During his service in the Life Guard, Colfax was promoted from second lieutenant to first lieutenant, and then finally to captain in April 1783. Colfax was present at the Surrender of Lord Cornwallis, at Yorktown and permitted by Washington to occupy a prominent position, on horseback, near Washington. According to Connecticut records, he served in the Continental Army until January 1, 1780. Colfax retired from the army on November 3, 1783.

== Later life ==
He was appointed by the legislature to be a Justice of the Peace for the Court of Common Pleas of Bergen County for many years. He served in the New Jersey legislature from 1806–13, in the General Assembly (1806, 07, 09, 10, and 11) and the Legislative Council (1808, 12, and 13). In 1811 he was Brigadier General of the Second Division of Infantry, Bergen Brigade where in the War of 1812 he had a command at Sandy Hook.

== Death ==
William Colfax died after couple days of illness on September 9, 1838. The services were held in the Reformed Dutch Church at Pompton and were led by Reverend Isaac S. Demarest. He received full military honors, the Militia of Paterson and the whole town showed up. General Abraham Godwin and Colonel Cornelius G. Garrison commanded the martial music. Colfax was buried at his estate in Wayne, New Jersey.

== Personal life ==
William was the fifth child born to George Colfax (born: December 25, 1727) and Lucy Avery (married April 13, 1749), who had a total of ten children. Colfax was about 5'-10" tall and weighed about 190-200 lbs. He had blue eyes, dark hair, and was clean shaven. His hair was powdered and worn in a queue, tied with a black ribbon, till his later years. He was married to Hester Schuyler, cousin of Philip Schuyler, of Pompton on August 27, 1783, together they had six children. They lived in Hester's inherited Schuyler-Colfax House in Wayne, New Jersey, which today is a museum. Their grandson was Schuyler Colfax, the 17th Vice President of the United States.
