= Albert Goodwin (disambiguation) =

Albert Goodwin (1887–1918) was a Canadian trade unionist.

Albert Goodwin may also refer to:

- Albert Goodwin (historian) (1906–1995), English historian
- Albert Goodwin (artist) (1845–1932), English landscape painter

== See also ==
- Goodwin (surname)
