= United States Attorney for the District of Michigan =

Defunct U.S. federal prosecutor's office

United States Attorney for the District of Michigan is a defunct United States Attorney's office that served Michigan Territory and then the state of Michigan until 1863. The U.S. Attorney for Michigan was the chief law enforcement officer for the United States District Court for the District of Michigan. The district was succeeded by the United States Attorney for the Western District of Michigan and the United States Attorney for the Eastern District of Michigan.

== Office holders ==
- Solomon Sibley (1815–1824)
- Andrew G. Whitney (1824–1826)
- Daniel LeRoy (1826–1834)
- Daniel Goodwin (1834–1841)
- George C. Bates (1841–1845)
- John Norvell (1845–1850)
- George C. Bates (1850–1853)
- Samuel Barstow (1852–1853)
- George E. Hand (1853–1857)
- Joseph Miller Jr. (1857–1861)
- William L. Stoughton (1861–1862)
- Alfred Russell (1861–1863)
