= Josh Goodwin =

American basketball player (born 1984)

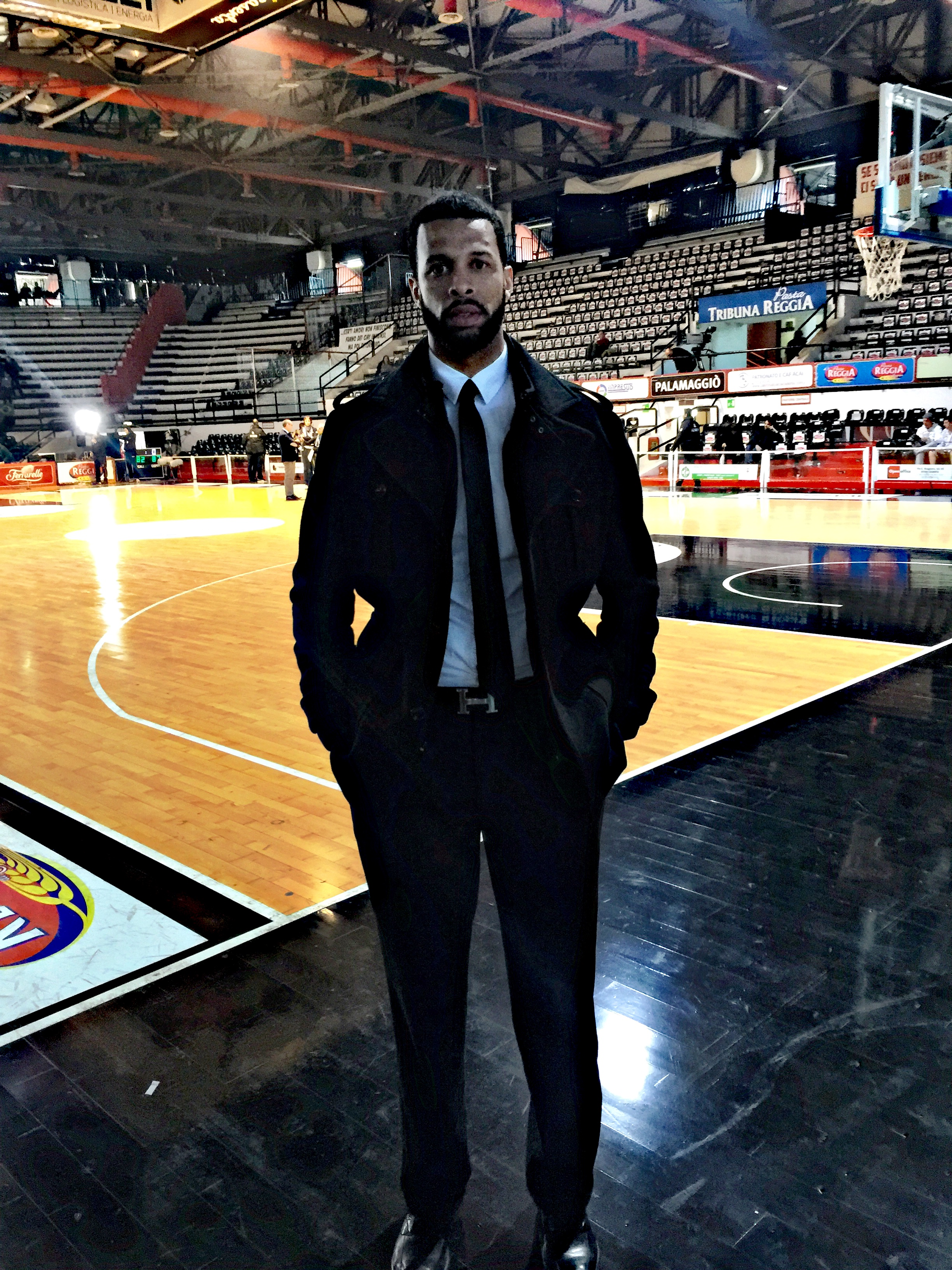
- Goodwin in 2016

Personal information
- Born: July 22, 1983 (age 42) Lake Charles, LA, U.S.
- Listed height: 6 ft 9 in (2.06 m)
- Listed weight: 206 lb (93 kg)

Career information
- College: Lamar (2003–2006)
- NBA draft: 2006: undrafted
- Playing career: 2006–2007
- Position: Forward
- Number: 44

Career history
- 2006: BG Karlsruhe
- 2006: Norrköping Dolphins
- 2007: Jalaa SC
- 2007: Manawatu Jets
- 2007: Al-Jahra

Career highlights
- Dubai International Tournament -07 (Runner-Up)

Joshua Jermaine Goodwin (born July 22, 1983) is an American retired basketball player. After three seasons playing collegiately for Lamar, he spent two years playing professionally in several countries.

== College career ==
Goodwin played collegiately in the NCAA for Lamar Cardinals basketball playing 71 games and starting 20 overall, with averages of 5.8 points, 5.5 rebounds FGP:55.3%. His best year was as a senior, with averages of 6.9 points, 6.0 rebounds and led the team with 57.2% from the field. Set a career high scoring 31 points and 15rebs vs. Nicholls St. on March 1, 2006. Goodwin was a junior college transfer from Southwestern Christian College where he averaged 16.3 points, 8.9rebounds, and 2.0 blocks per game.

== International career ==
After going undrafted in 2006, he signed a contract to play in Karlsruhe Germany for Union Shops Rastatt Basketball Bundesliga where he led the league in rebounds and averaged (11.3ppg, Reb-1(11.2rpg), 1.0spg). He also played in Sweden for Norrköping Dolphins where he averaged (10.5ppg, 2.5rpg, 1.0ast, 2FGP: 58.3%) in FIBA EuroCup Challenge. In 2007 he signed in New Zealand to play for the Manawatu Jets then finishing up in Dubai, and Bahrain playing for Nuwaidrat.

=== Sports management ===
In 2007 while playing professionally abroad he founded Higher Level Sports Agency as the CEO signing clients Darius Rice and Donald Little to lucrative contracts.

== Personal life ==
Goodwin is the son of the late Patrice Sias and Jessie Goodwin, and has a sister named Kayla Cole.
