= Jeff Godwin =

American Christian fundamentalist preacher

Jeffrey Godwin is a Christian fundamentalist preacher and author from Bloomington, Indiana, USA. He is best known for his numerous books critical of both secular and Christian rock music. Godwin is a former drug addict and rock musician. He claims that he survived the stampede that claimed the lives of 12 fans of The Who at their Cincinnati concert on December 3, 1979.

== Conversion ==
Godwin was converted to fundamentalist Christianity in 1984 by his future wife's family. Subsequently, Godwin became a King James Only fundamentalist very much in line with Jack Chick, who published his first three works.

== Teachings on rock music ==
According to Godwin, rock and roll music traces its origins back thousands of years. Its rhythms were written by Satan and his demons and have a subliminal power to control a listener's mind. The rhythms eventually found their way, via Africa, into blues, jazz and other forms of African American music before they appeared in rock music. In addition, rock music is loaded with references to sexual behavior of all kinds, and he believes it encourages fornication amongst youths and inspires lust. He also believe it inspires rage and it preaches "rebellion, hatred, drug abuse, suicide, fornication and the dark things of Satan".

When Ozzy Osbourne bit the head off a dove, Godwin viewed it as Osbourne's desire to destroy the Holy Spirit, which is often represented by a dove. Satanic symbols dating back centuries, Godwin maintains, can be found in the album covers of rock music, testifying to Satan's power. While Godwin believes that Satanic messages have been backmasked (recorded backwards) on rock albums, he believes that Satan's presence in rock music has rarely required hiding. Godwin sees Satan's influence in music as being maintained by secret alliances between rock musicians, producers and promoters uniting with demons and Satan himself. He further believes that Christian rock is another diversion created by Satan, as the rock music industry itself is compromised by Satan. The Christianity preached in Christian rock, he says, is feel good, inoffensive and does not genuinely preach Christ.

== Published works ==
- Godwin, Jeff (1986). Devil's Disciples: The Truth About Rock Music. Chino, California: Chick Publications. ISBN 0-937958-23-9. OCLC 16700225.
- Godwin, Jeff (1988). Dancing With Demons: The Music's Real Master. Chino, California]: Chick Publications. ISBN 0-937958-28-X. OCLC 19979900.
- Godwin, Jeff (1990). What's Wrong With Christian Rock?. Chino, California]: Chick Publications. ISBN 0-937958-36-0. OCLC 124631260.
- Godwin, Jeff (1995). Rock & Roll Religion: A War Against God. Bloomington, Indiana: Rock Ministries. ISBN 0-9643732-0-3. OCLC 36469503.
