= Abraham Godwin =

American politician

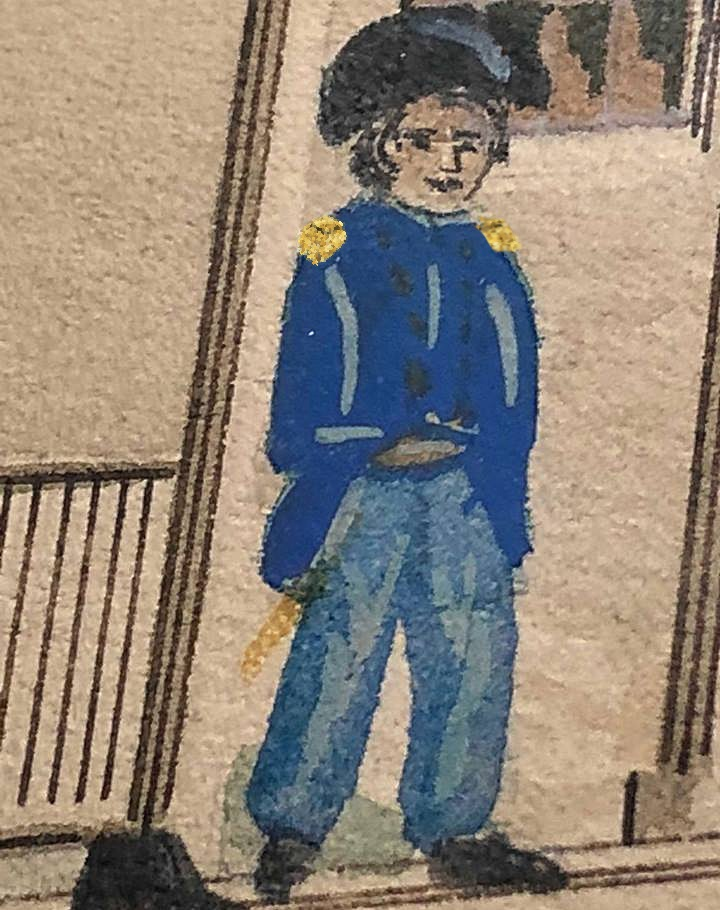

State Legislature of New Jersey
- In office 1802–1806

Personal details
- Born: Abraham Godwin; July 16, 1763 Totowa, New Jersey, British America
- Died: October 5, 1835 (aged 72) Paterson, New Jersey, U.S.
- Party: Democratic Party
- Spouse: Maria Munson
- Occupation: Fife Major, Brigadier General, Politician, Freemason, Master Engraver, Inn Keeper, Musician, Poet, Artist.

Abraham Godwin (July 16, 1763 – October 5, 1835) was a representative in the New Jersey General Assembly, former fife major in the American Revolutionary War, and brigadier general during the War of 1812.

== Personal life ==
Abraham Godwin was born to Captain Abraham Godwin and Phebe Coole in Totowa, New Jersey. His father built up the area around Totowa, now known as Paterson, New Jersey, building the Godwin Hotel and creating the first stage coach line for tourists to travel to the Passaic Falls. Abraham Godwin married Mary Maria Munson on July 3, 1783, in the First Presbyterian Church in Morristown, New Jersey. They had nine children, Phebe, Henry, Caleb, Susanna, Abraham, Maria, Catharine, Elizabeth, and Margaret. His son Henry committed suicide after going bankrupt producing cotton in 1816. His grandson, Parke Godwin, was an acclaimed author and journalist.

== Career ==
=== Revolutionary War ===
Abraham's father joined the American cause in early 1776 and was captain of Marines stationed on board the USS Lady Washington in New York City. Abraham's older brother Henry became a Quartermaster in Fishkill, New York, and his younger brother David was a Drummer. Abraham and David were re-united with their father when they enlisted in New York City. Abraham's father survived getting shot during the Siege of New York. Knowing the topography of New Jersey, they led George Washington's army to Totowa where he stayed at the Godwin Hotel. After that they split ways, Washington to the Delaware River, and the Godwins to Fishkill. The Godwins had much debt to the Tories, and lost half their land as a result. The British raided the Godwin homestead, stripping Phebe and the daughters of everything. This sickened Abraham's father even more, to the point where he died early in 1777. In the spring, Abraham, Henry, and David were ordered to Fort Montgomery to lay a chain across the North River. On October 7, 1777, the Battle of Forts Clinton and Montgomery took place. David was ordered to send for help, Henry was captured by the British, and Abraham jumped into the Hudson and swam to shore. Abraham was present at the Siege of Yorktown, witnessed the surrender of Charles Cornwallis to George Washington, and received an honorable discharge signed by George Washington.

Abraham Godwin, now Brigadier General of the New Jersey militia, marches a troop of Seventy Six men to Sandy Hook point, where they would build the first American forts. August 17th, 1814.

=== Master engraver ===
Towards the end of the war Abraham became an engraving apprentice of Andrew Billings, a silversmith and an engraver of bookplates. Within a few years Abraham became better than his master. Abraham soon found himself with high-profile projects, like his engraving of the certificate for the General Society of Mechanics and Tradesmen of the City of New York or his certificate for the Fire Department of New York City, among others. He most likely painted a portrait of George Washington while he stayed at the Passaic Hotel.

=== Society for Establishing Useful Manufactures ===
Alexander Hamilton had envisioned the Passaic Falls as a powerhouse for manufacturing since his first visit in 1778. While he was Treasury Secretary he led the Society for Establishing Useful Manufactures and they decided on the newly named Paterson. They met at the Godwin Hotel. Abraham led the group surveying the land surrounding the falls. Hamilton made the final call to place the factories right next to the falls rather than dig expensive canals to place them miles away. They all agreed.

=== New Jersey General Assembly (1802–1806) ===
Abraham voted for the gradual abolition of slavery in 1804, and the law was overruled in 1807. Godwin also attended numerous lodge meetings with the Freemasons in Trenton, New Jersey from 1802 to 1820.

=== Brigadier General in the War of 1812 ===
Abraham quickly rose to the rank of brigadier general because of his time in the New Jersey State Legislature. His son was a Lieutenant. He patrolled the beaches between Atlantic City and Sandy Hook, and was praised when he brought volunteers from Paterson to help build the first fort in Sandy Hook.

== Later life ==
Abraham retired to a peaceful life running a hotel in Paterson. He wrote poems and songs, continued engraving, and made many paintings. The Godwin Hotel was a well known tourist attraction while he was alive. It was advertised in the papers that there was always a fiddler ready to play. He was nominated the only elector for Andrew Jackson in New Jersey in 1828. In 1829, the greatest honor was bestowed upon him, the township just north of the Passaic river was named Godwinville.

=== Death ===
He died of unknown causes in Paterson on October 5, 1835.

== Legacy ==
Godwinville was renamed Ridgewood in the 1876 by Samuel and Cornelia Dayton. The Paterson and Ramapo Railroad Company fought this decision. The Godwin Hotel lost its prestige after Abraham died, and it fell into disrepair. The building was torn down in 1915. Many remnants of Godwin still remain in Paterson, Ridgewood, and the surrounding areas. There are two roads in Paterson, Godwin Street and Godwin Avenue, that were chopped in half by the train tracks. From Wyckoff through Midland Park and ending at Ridgewood another Godwin Avenue exists, formerly known as Godwinville Road. In 1951, the Captain Abraham Godwin chapter of the Sons of the American Revolution erected a monument to Abraham Godwin in Van Neste Square in Ridgewood, New Jersey. In 2016, the monument had lights installed so it could be viewed at night.
