= Barry Goodwin =

American economist

Barry Kent Goodwin is an American economist, currently the Wm Neal Reynolds Distinguished Professor at North Carolina State University.

== Career ==
Barry Goodwin is the William Neal Reynolds Distinguished Professor and Graduate Alumni Distinguished Professor in the Departments of Agricultural and Resource Economics and Economics.

He has held faculty positions at Kansas State University and the Ohio State University. His research and teaching activities are focused on applied economics, policy, trade, and econometrics.
