= George Edward Hand =

American politician and judge

- Born: August 16, 1809; Madison, Connecticut
- Died: August 30, 1889 (aged 80); Madison, Connecticut
- Education: Yale College
- Occupations: Politician, Judge

George Edward Hand (August 16, 1809 – August 30, 1889) was an American politician and judge.

Hand, son of Daniel and Artemisia (Meigs) was born in Madison (then East Guilford), Connecticut, August 16, 1809. The only survivor of a large family of brothers and sisters is Daniel Hand, well known for his recent gift to the American Missionary Association.

He graduated from Yale College in 1829. After teaching for a short time in Connecticut, he went to Detroit, Michigan, where he studied law and was admitted to practice. He was soon recognized as a lawyer of ability and promise, and in 1835 he was appointed Judge of Probate for the county. In 1846 he was elected to the Michigan House of Representatives. Under President Pierce he held the office of U.S. Attorney for the district of Michigan. In later life he relinquished active practice, and was occupied with the care of his large property in real estate—until symptoms of softening of the brain appeared about 1884. In 1885 he was taken to his early home in Madison, where he died on August 30, 1889, at the age of 80. He was never married.
