= Deryck Goodwin =

Deryck William Goodwin (28 September 1927 – 12 March 1997) was an English physicist, particularly researching into lasers. In later years he was an Anglican priest.

== Life ==
He was born in Lincoln, and was educated at Lincoln School. He studied at the University of Birmingham, where after graduating he completed a PhD.

At the Royal Radar Establishment in Malvern, he investigated indium antimonide as an infrared detector; he built a ruby laser, thought to be the first ruby laser to operate in Britain, and investigated the spectroscopy of possible laser materials.

He joined the academic staff of the University of York soon after its establishment, and helped to set up the undergraduate and postgraduate programmes in physics. He continued his research into lasers, investigating materials for lasers, and possible applications. He wrote articles in newspapers and magazines about laser technology and its importance outside scientific research.

Goodwin was ordained as an Anglican priest in 1978, and for nine years was a non-stipendiary curate at Elvington, near York. He retired from the university in 1986, and became vicar of Burton Pidsea, near Hull. He was afterwards rector of Middleton with Newton, Levisham and Lockton in North Yorkshire, until retirement in 1994.

He advised about the lighting of churches, and set up Goodwin Lighting, a voluntary consultancy. The service, initially in the Diocese of York, spread beyond the region and included Lincoln Cathedral, Westminster Abbey and Fountains Abbey.

Goodwin died of cancer in 1997, aged 69. His wife Joyce née Lumley, whom he married in 1988, died in 2013.
