= William Goodwin =

Billy, Bill, Will or William Goodwin may refer to:

== Performers ==
- Bill Goodwin (1910–1958), American radio, film and TV personality
- Bill Goodwin (jazz drummer) (born 1942), American musician

== Public officials ==
- William Gradwell Goodwin (1862–1942), English mayor of Newcastle-under-Lyme
- William S. Goodwin (1866–1937), American congressman from Arkansas
- William Nelson Goodwin (1909–1975), American federal judge

== Scholars ==
- William Goodwin (priest) (1555–1620), English academic and Anglican Dean of Christ Church
- William Watson Goodwin (1831–1912), American classical scholar
- William Archer Rutherfoord Goodwin (1869–1939), American Episcopal clergyman, a/k/a W. A. R. Goodwin

== Sportsmen ==
- Billy Goodwin (1892–1951), English footballer with Manchester United
- Bill Goodwin (Welsh footballer) (1892–1972), full-back with Crewe Alexandra F.C.
- William Goodwin, American winner of two miles at 1927 USA Indoor Track and Field Championships
- Will Goodwin (born 2002), English footballer, forward with Colchester United

== See also ==
- William Godwin (disambiguation)
