= Parke Godwin (journalist) =

United States journalist (1816–1904)

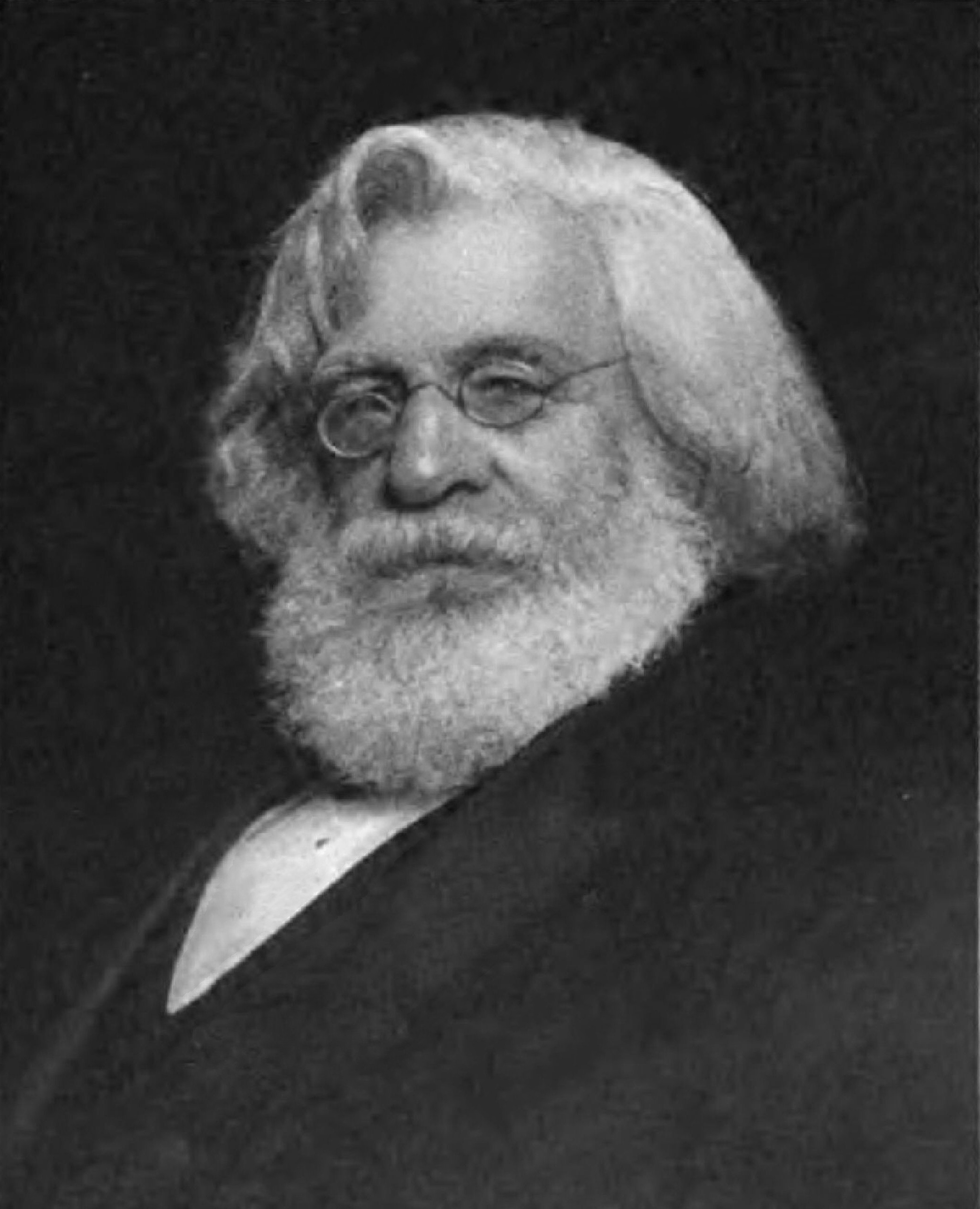
- Born: February 28, 1816; Paterson, New Jersey
- Died: January 7, 1904 (aged 87); New York, New York
- Occupation: Journalist

Parke Godwin (February 28, 1816 – January 7, 1904) was an American journalist associated with New York.

== Biography ==
Godwin was born on February 28, 1816, in Paterson, New Jersey. His father Abraham Godwin was a Lieutenant in the War of 1812, and his grandfather Abraham Godwin a Fife Major in the American Revolution. He graduated from Princeton University in 1834, studied law, and was admitted to the bar of Kentucky, but did not practice. He married the eldest daughter of William Cullen Bryant, and moved to New York City in 1837.

He became interested in journalism and by the 1830s was writing for the Evening Post and The United States Magazine and Democratic Review under John L. O'Sullivan. The reforms he advocated in the Democratic Review were subsequently introduced into the constitution and code of New York. Except for one year, he was connected with the Evening Post from 1837 to 1853. In 1843 he ran a weekly called Pathfinder, but it only lasted three months.

He was deputy collector in the New York Custom House under President James K. Polk, an early member of the Republican Party, and a consistent advocate of free trade. He supported the Republicans with speeches and writing.

He became a supporter of Fourierism and wrote a book which became an authority on the movement. However, in 1845, he was critical of the work of Albert Brisbane and his view of Associationism (Fourierism), though he still contributed to the new incarnation of Brisbane's journal The Phalanx printed at Brook Farm in Massachusetts. Godwin saw these sorts of communities as embracing the democratic ideals and equal rights. Further, he believed there was a connection between democracy and religion; as he said "Christianity and Democracy are one." In May 1846, Godwin was elected Foreign Corresponding Secretary of the New England Fourier Society.

In 1850, Godwin and his family allowed Catharine Forrest to stay with them during the public scandal that erupted surrounding her divorce from actor Edwin Forrest. Also in the 1850s, Godwin became an ardent abolitionist and felt that slavery diluted the American concept. In 1855, he asked: "What is America, and who are Americans? ...The real American gives his mind and heart to the grand constituent ideas of the republic... no matter whether his corporeal chemistry was first ignited in Kamschatka [sic] or the moon". Godwin was against slavery, but ridiculed the New England reform movements for not attempting to impact the rest of the country. He said, "If the Deity should consult New England about making a new world, they would advise that it should be made the size of Massachusetts, have no city but Boston and insist in making an occasional donation to a charitable institution and uttering shallow anti-slavery sentiments."

Godwin became an associate editor of Putnam's Magazine with George William Curtis under managing editor Charles Frederick Briggs; the three also collaborated on a gift book called The Homes of American Authors (1852). Godwin expressed his antislavery sentiments in Putnam's and criticized then-president Franklin Pierce; backlash from Democrats hurt the circulation of the magazine, especially after November 1854, when Godwin published his essay "American Despotisms". In 1857, he and fellow editor Curtis supported Frederick Law Olmsted as designer of Central Park.

In 1865, Godwin returned to the Evening Post. He became sole editor of Putnam's from January 1868 to November 1870. In June 1878, he succeeded Bryant as editor of the Evening Post after his father-in-law's death, remaining in that position for three years, until the paper was sold to Henry Villard. Later, he edited the posthumous works of William Cullen Bryant as Poetical Works (1883) and Complete Prose Writings (1884) as well as A Biography of William Cullen Bryant, with Extracts from his private Correspondence (1883).

Godwin died of an illness at 5:30 a.m. on January 7, 1904, at his New York home, surrounded by several of his daughters.

== Works ==
Besides the works mentioned above, he wrote:

- Popular View of the Doctrines of Charles Fourier (New York, 1844)
- Constructive Democracy (1851)
- Vala, a Mythological Tale (1851)
- A Handbook of Universal Biography (1851; new ed., entitled Cyclopedia of Biography, 1871)
- Political Essays (1856)
- History of France (1st vol., 1861)
- Out of the Past, a volume of essays (1870)
- New Study of Shakespeare's Sonnets (1901)

He made translations from the prose of Goethe, Fouqué, and Zschokke.
