= Jeff Goodwin (cricketer) =

English cricketer

Personal information
- Full name: Thomas Jeffrey Goodwin
- Born: 22 January 1929; Bignall End, Staffordshire, England
- Died: 15 February 2006 (aged 77); Leicester, Leicestershire, England
- Batting: Left-handed
- Bowling: Left-arm fast-medium
- Role: Bowler

Domestic team information
- Years: Team
- 1950–1959: Leicestershire

Career statistics
Competition	First-class
Matches	136
Runs scored	474
Batting average	5.44
100s/50s	0/0
Top score	23*
Balls bowled	19,307
Wickets	335
Bowling average	30.17
5 wickets in innings	15
10 wickets in match	2
Best bowling	8/81
Catches/stumpings	40/–
- Source: CricketArchive, 12 October 2024

Thomas Jeffrey Goodwin (22 January 1929 – 15 February 2006) was an English cricketer active from 1950 to 1959 who played for Leicestershire. He was born in Bignall End, Staffordshire. He appeared in 136 first-class matches as a lefthanded batsman who bowled left arm fast medium. He scored 474 runs with a highest score of 23* and took 335 wickets with a best performance of eight for 81.
