= Francis Goodwin (cricketer) =

English cricketer (1866–1931)

Francis Herbert Goodwin (4 January 1866 – 20 January 1931) was an English cricketer active in 1894 who played for Lancashire. He was born in Rainhill and died in Liverpool. He appeared in three first-class matches as a lefthanded batsman, scoring 14 runs with a highest score of 10.
