= Ken Goodwin =

Ken Goodwin may refer to:

- Ken Goodwin (comedian) (1933–2012), English comedian
- Ken Goodwin (academic) (1934–2014), Australian academic
- Ken Goodwin (RAF officer), British pilot, Air Force Commander in 74 Squadron RAF from 1966 to 1969
- Ken Goodwin (field hockey) (born 1961), Canadian former field hockey goalkeeper
