= Alfred Goodwin (pentathlete) =

British modern pentathlete

Personal information
- Born: Alfred Allan Goodwin; 16 December 1902 Worcester, Worcestershire England
- Died: 29 April 1950 (aged 47) Aldershot, Hampshire, England

Sport
- Sport: Modern pentathlon

Alfred Allan Goodwin OBE (16 December 1902 – 29 April 1950) was a British modern pentathlete. He competed at the 1928 Summer Olympics.

== Personal life ==
Goodwin served in the Suffolk Regiment during the Second World War and was captured in Greece in 1941, spending the rest of war in prisoner of war camps in Germany. Following the war, he was made an OBE for his military service. Goodwin continued to serve and by his death in 1950, was a lieutenant colonel.
