= Daniel Goodwin (Michigan judge) =

American judge (1799–1887)

- Portrait of Goodwin by Alvah Bradish
- Born: November 24, 1799; Geneva, New York
- Died: August 25, 1887 (aged 87); Detroit, Michigan
- Occupation: Justice of the Michigan Supreme Court

Daniel Goodwin (November 24, 1799 – August 25, 1887) was a justice of the Michigan Supreme Court from 1843 to 1846.

== Early life, education, and career ==
Born in Geneva, New York, Goodwin was a descendant of Ozias Goodwin, who settled in Hartford, Connecticut, as early as 1635. His father, Dr. Daniel Goodwin, was a physician. Goodwin graduated from Union College in 1819, where his classmates included William H. Seward, and Bishops Doane and Potter. He read law with noted New York attorney John Canfield Spencer in Canandaigua, New York.

In 1825 he moved from New York to Detroit, then in the Michigan Territory, where his father had just died.

== United States Attorney ==
Before Michigan became a state in 1837, President Andrew Jackson offered Goodwin the district judgeship, but Goodwin thought the salary too small, and the position went to Ross Wilkins instead. Jackson, however, made Goodwin United States Attorney for the District of Michigan.

As U.S. Attorney, Goodwin prosecuted many individuals for violations of the Neutrality Act of 1794 during the Patriot War of 1837 and 1838, in which bands of U.S. citizens invaded Upper Canada to harass British troops stationed there. These prosecutions were unpopular, leading to threats against Goodwin, who was for a time given protective accompaniment by friends including General Hugh Brady and explorer Robert Stuart. In January 1838, Goodwin tried Thomas Sutherland, organizer of the attacks. However, witnesses were uncooperative and Judge Wilkins consistently sustained defense objections, ultimately dismissing the case. In July and December 1838, seven or more Patriots, following "filibuster" jaunts into Upper Canada, were charged by Goodwin only to be acquitted by Wilkins.

== Judicial service and other later-life activities ==
On July 13, 1843, Goodwin was appointed Judge of the First Circuit and Associate Justice of the Michigan Supreme Court. He served until October 1846, when he resigned. Goodwin was president of the Constitutional Convention of 1850, and also took part in the prosecution of the famous railroad conspiracy case in Detroit that year, in which Governor Seward was the leading counsel for the defense. In 1851, Goodwin was elected a circuit judge in the Upper Peninsula, and was thereafter continuously re-elected until 1881, serving for thirty years He was also a member of the Constitutional Convention 1867.

Goodwin died in Detroit at age of eighty-seven.

Political offices
Preceded by George Morell	Justice of the Michigan Supreme Court; 1843–1846	Succeeded by George Miles
