= Daniel Raynes Goodwin =

The Reverend Daniel Raynes Goodwin
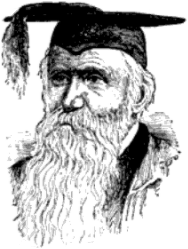
- Born: April 12, 1811; North Berwick, Maine, U.S.
- Died: March 15, 1890 (aged 78); Philadelphia, Pennsylvania, U.S.
- Education: Bowdoin College
- Occupation: Educator

Daniel Raynes Goodwin (1811–1890) was an American Episcopal cleric and academic. He was the fourth President of Trinity College in Hartford, Connecticut, and the twelfth provost of the University of Pennsylvania.

== Biography ==
Daniel Raynes Goodwin was born in North Berwick, Maine on April 12, 1811, graduated from Bowdoin College in 1832, and served as thirteenth President of University of Pennsylvania.

He died at his home in Philadelphia on March 15, 1890.

An oil portrait of Daniel Raynes Goodwin is in the collection of the Strawbery Banke Museum in Portsmouth, New Hampshire. The home of Goodwin's brother, Ichabod Goodwin, who was governor of New Hampshire, is also on the grounds of the Strawbery Banke Museum.

== Bibliography ==
- Memoir of John Merrick, Esq. Prepared for the Maine Historical Society (1862)
- Southern Slavery in Its Present Aspects: Containing a Reply to a Late Work of the Bishop of Vermont on Slavery (1864)
- The New Ritualistic Divinity: Being a Defense of the Protestant Episcopal Church in Pennsylvania (1879)
- The Presbyter's Reply to the Priests Letter (1879)
- Notes of the Investigation by the Bishop and Standing Committee in Reference to Certain Practices at St. Clement's Church (1880)
- Shall the Protestant Episcopal Church in the United States of America Cease to Exist?
- Longfellow Memorial Address: Before the Alumni of Bowdoin College, July 12, 1882 (1882)
- Notes on the Late Revision of the New Testament Version (1883)
- Christian Eschatology (1885)
