= Reclaimed lumber =

Processed wood reused for other applications

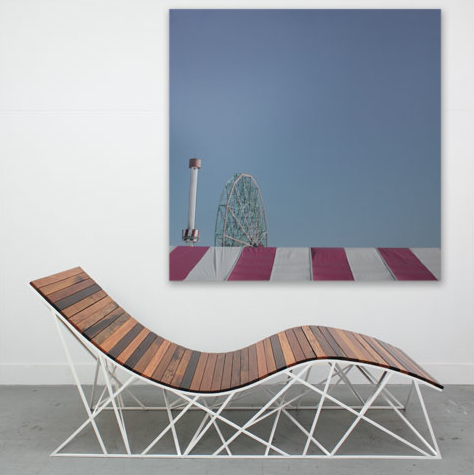
A lounge chair using reclaimed wood

Reclaimed lumber is processed wood retrieved from its original application for purposes of subsequent use. Most reclaimed lumber comes from timbers and decking rescued from old barns, factories and warehouses, although some companies use wood from less traditional structures such as boxcars, coal mines and wine barrels. Reclaimed or antique lumber is used primarily for decoration and home building, for example for siding, architectural details, cabinetry, furniture and flooring.

== Wood origins ==
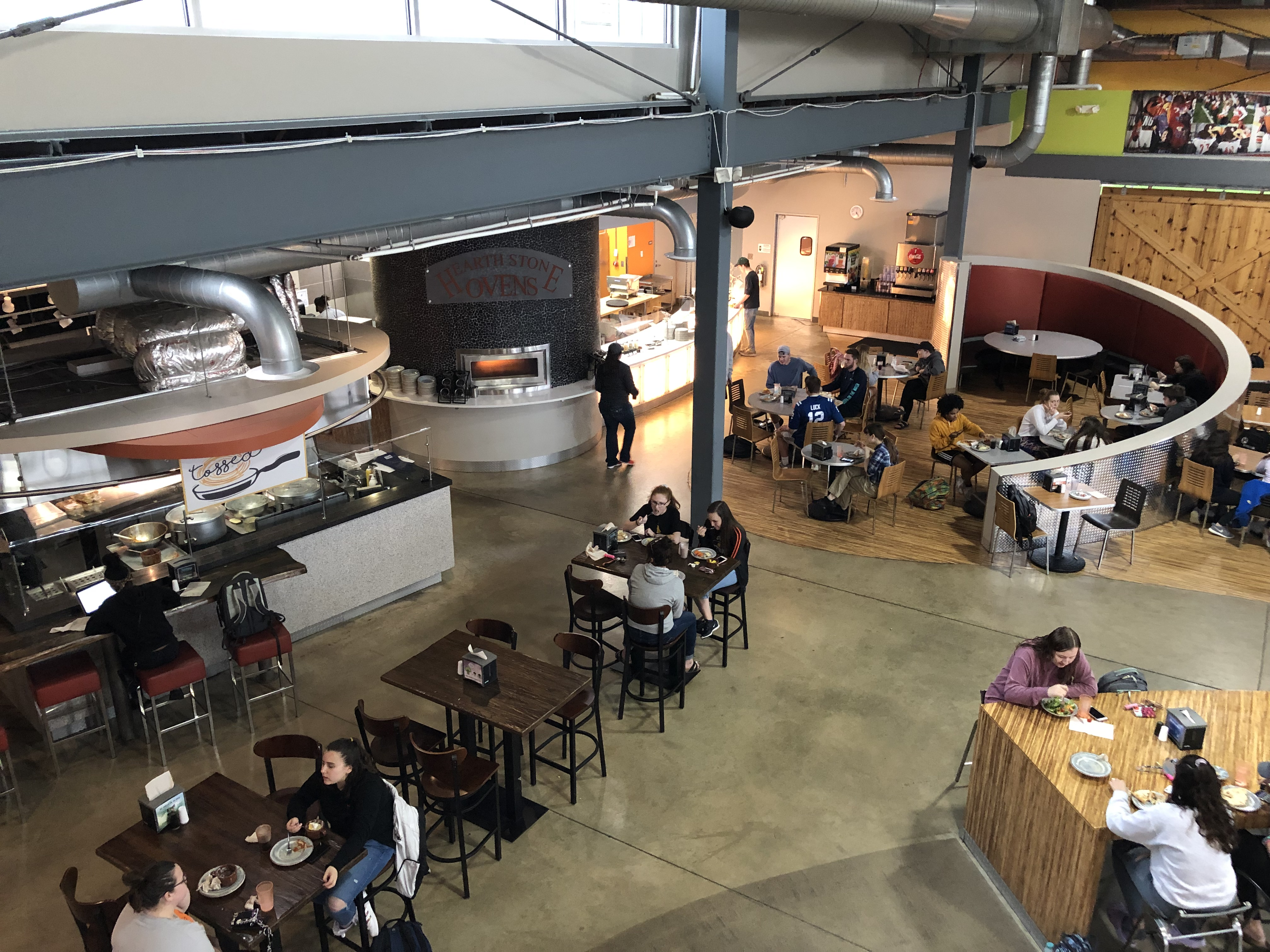
This dining hall uses wood recycled from barns for flooring, walls, and furniture.

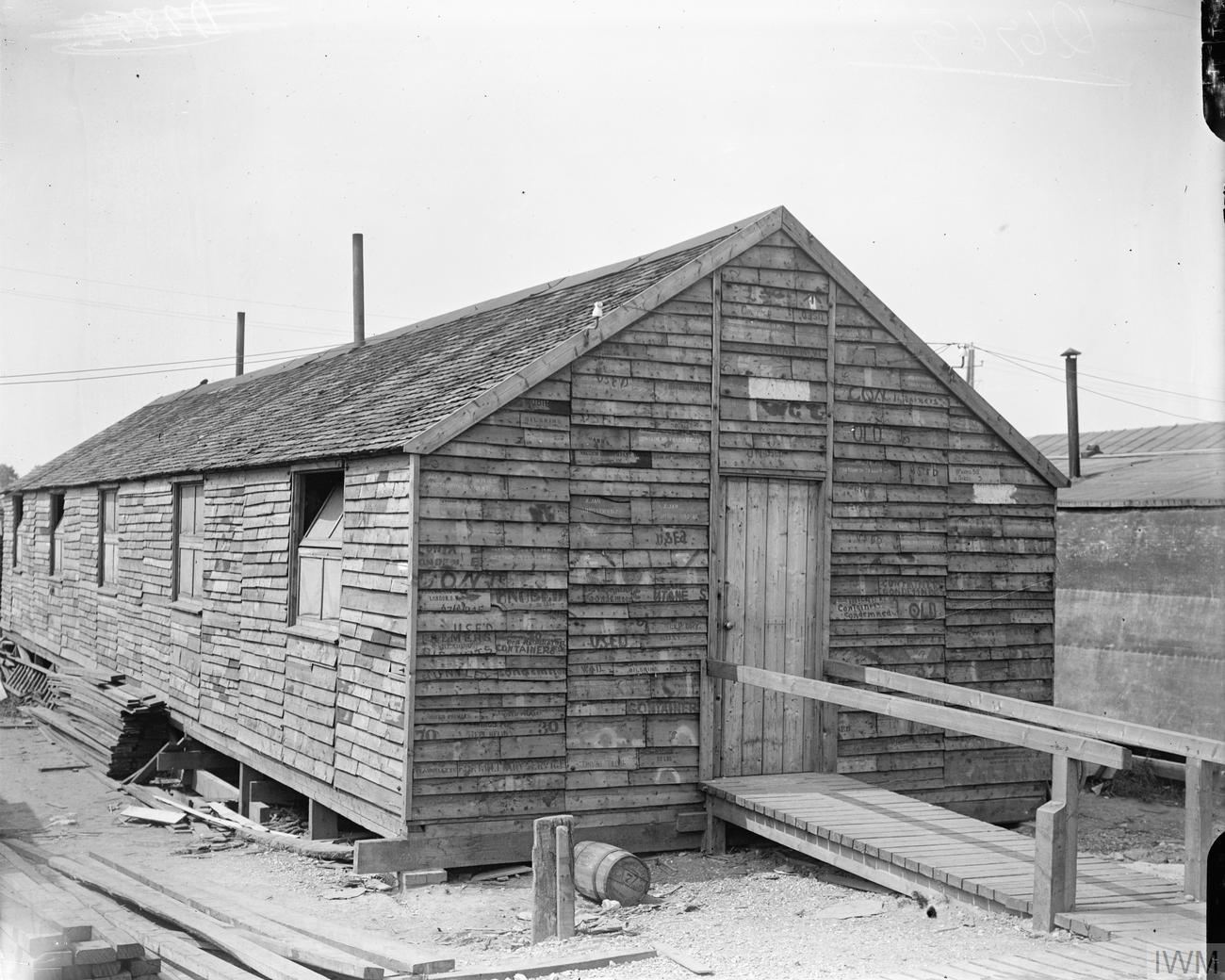
A Tarrant hut during World War I built with wood from old boxes and crates

In the United States of America, wood once functioned as the primary building material because it was strong, relatively inexpensive and abundant. Today, many of the woods that were once plentiful are only available in large quantities through reclamation. One common reclaimed wood, longleaf pine, was used to build factories and warehouses during the Industrial Revolution. The trees were slow-growing (taking 200 to 400 years to mature), tall, straight, and had a natural ability to resist mold and insects. They were also abundant. Longleaf pine grew in thick forests that spanned over 140,000 square miles (360,000 km^{2}) of North America. Reclaimed longleaf pine is often sold as "heart pine", where the word "heart" refers to the heartwood of the tree.

Previously common woods for building barns and other structures were redwood (Sequoia sempervirens) on the U.S. west coast and American chestnut on the U.S. east coast. Beginning in 1904, a chestnut blight spread across the US, killing billions of American chestnuts, so when these structures were later dismantled, they were a welcome source of this desirable but later rare wood for subsequent reuse. American chestnut wood can be identified as pre- or post-blight by analysis of worm tracks in sawn timber. The presence of worm tracks suggests the trees were felled as dead standing timber, and may be post-blight lumber.

Barns are one of the most common sources for reclaimed wood in the United States. Those constructed through the early 19th century were typically built using whatever trees were growing on or near the builder's property. They often contain a mix of oak, chestnut, poplar, hickory and pine timber. Beam sizes were limited to what could be moved by man and horse. The wood was often hand-hewn with an axe and/or adze. Early settlers likely recognized American oak from their experience with its European species. Red, white, black, scarlet, willow, post, and pine oak varieties have all been used in North American barns.

Mill buildings throughout the Northeast also provide an abundant source of reclaimed wood. Wood that is reclaimed from these buildings includes structural timbers – such as beams, posts, and joists – along with decking, flooring, and sheathing. These buildings often have no economic or reuse possibility, can be a fire hazard, and may require varying degrees of environmental cleanup. Reclaiming lumber and brick from these retired mills is considered a better use of materials than landfill-based disposal.

Another source of reclaimed wood is old snowfence. Recycled from the mountains and plains of the Rocky Mountain region, snowfence boards are a source of consistent and structurally sound reclaimed wood.

Other woods recycled and reprocessed into new wood products include coast redwood, hard maple, Douglas fir, walnuts, hickories, red and white oak, and Eastern white pine.

== Properties ==
Reclaimed lumber is popular for many reasons: the wood's unique appearance, its contribution to green building, the history of the wood's origins, and the wood's physical characteristics such as strength, stability and durability. The increased strength of reclaimed wood is often attributed to the wood often having been harvested from virgin growth timber, which generally grew more slowly, producing a denser grain.

Reclaimed beams can often be sawn into wider planks than newly harvested lumber, and many companies claim their products are more stable than newly-cut wood because reclaimed wood has been exposed to changes in humidity for far longer.

== Reclaimed lumber industry ==
The reclaimed lumber industry gained momentum in the early 1980s on the West Coast when large-scale reuse of softwoods began. The industry grew due to a growing concern for environmental impact as well as declining quality in new lumber. On the East Coast, industry pioneers began selling reclaimed wood in the early 1970s but the industry stayed mostly small until the 1990s as waste disposal increased and deconstruction became a more economical alternative to demolition. A trade association, the Reclaimed Wood Council, was formed in May 2003 but dissolved in January 2008 due to a lack of participation among the larger reclaimed wood distributors.

Reclaimed lumber is sold under a number of names, such as antique lumber, distressed lumber, recovered lumber, upcycled lumber, and others. It is often confused with salvage logging.

== LEED ==
The Leadership in Energy and Environmental Design (LEED) Green Building Rating System is the US Green Building Council's (USGBC) benchmark for designing, building and operating green buildings. To be certified, projects must first meet the prerequisites designated by the USGBC and then earn a certain number of credits within six categories: sustainable sites, water efficiency, energy and atmosphere, materials and resources, indoor environmental quality, innovation and design process.

Using reclaimed wood can earn credits towards achieving LEED project certification. Because reclaimed wood is considered recycled content, it meets the 'materials and resources' criteria for LEED certification, and because some reclaimed lumber products are Forest Stewardship Council (FSC) certified, they can qualify for LEED credits under the 'certified wood' category.

== See also ==
- Pallet crafts
- Timber recycling
