= Reclaimed Wood Council =

US building material trade association

The Reclaimed Wood Council was a trade association that promoted reclaimed wood from old buildings or from logs reclaimed from rivers. The council was formed in May 2003 and dissolved in January 2008.
