= Commander-in-Chief's Guard =

Infantry company of the United States Army

- The Commander-in-Chief's Guard in 2017
- Active: 1776–1783; 1973–present
- Country: United States
- Branch: Army
- Type: Infantry
- Role: Infantry Rifle Company Special Ceremonial Unit
- Size: Company
- Part of: 3d Infantry Regiment
- Garrison: Fort Myer, Virginia
- Facings: Red
- Anniversaries: Organization Day (March 12)
- Arms: Brown Bess

The Commander-in-Chief's Guard, formally known as Company A, 3d Infantry Regiment, is an infantry unit of the United States Army.

== History ==
=== American Revolutionary War ===
The Commander-in-Chief's Guard was organized on March 12, 1776, at Cambridge, Massachusetts, as the bodyguard and personal escort to General George Washington. To the consternation of the revolutionary government in Philadelphia, it came to be referred to as "His Excellency's Guard" and "Washington's Life Guard"; in April 1777 the Second Continental Congress warned that the use of such monikers in official communications was prohibited. The Commander-in-Chief's Guard had a fluctuating strength that normally hovered between 180 and 250 men and was disbanded on November 15, 1783.

=== American Revolution Bicentennial ===
The 3rd Infantry Regiment, of which Company A is part, was activated on June 3, 1784, and deactivated in 1946. In 1948 the regiment was reactivated and tasked with the military defense of the District of Columbia. The former "ceremonial detachment" of the Military District of Washington, a company-sized public duties unit, was reassigned to the 3rd Infantry Regiment as Company A, 1st Battalion. On December 1, 1973, in preparation for celebrations of the American Revolution Bicentennial, Company A was designated the Commander-in-Chief's Guard and took its current form.

== Role ==
The company is a "Special Ceremonial Unit"that has public duties and riot control missions within the Washington metropolitan area". The Commander-in-Chief's Guard is designated by the U.S. Army as a "Special Ceremonial Unit" and is part of the 3rd Infantry Regiment, the United States' presidential escort regiment. It supports general officer retirement ceremonies, state arrivals, and the presidential inauguration.

== Equipment ==
=== Uniform ===
The Commander-in-Chief's Guard at the presidential inauguration, 2013

The company is a "Special Ceremonial Unit," a United States designation for units authorized uniforms other than the Army Service Uniform when executing public duties. Its ceremonial uniform consists of blue greatcoats and white coveralls. Cover consists of black tricorn hats and white powdered wigs.

=== Arms ===
It is equipped with muskets modeled on the Brown Bess (a design first developed in 1722 for service with the British Army), instead of the M14 rifle issued to the rest of the regiment for public duties. The Commander-in-Chief's Guard utilizes a banner that is a modified version of the personal position standard of George Washington.
