= Captain Abraham Godwin =

American settler and carpenter

Abraham Godwin
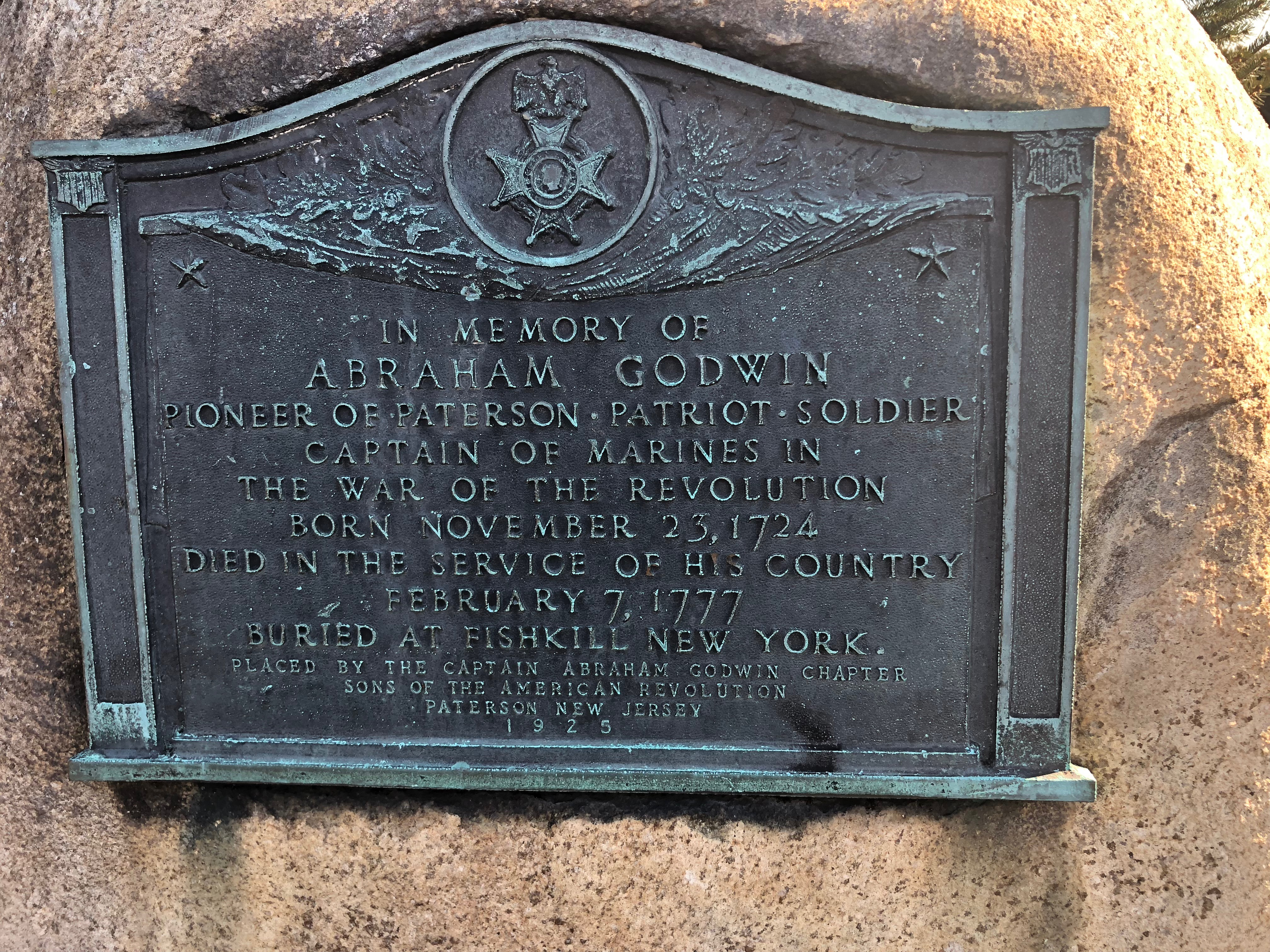
- Born: November 23, 1724; Dutchess County, New York
- Died: February 9, 1777 (aged 52); Fishkill, New York
- Other names: Gordon, Captain
- Occupations: Carpenter, stagecoach route, town collector, innkeeper, marine captain
- Spouse(s): Phebe Cool (Cole, Kool)
- Children: Abraham Godwin

Abraham Godwin (November 23, 1724 – February 9, 1777) was a carpenter from New York City and one of the first American settlers in the area of Paterson, New Jersey, earlier known as Acquackanonk. He built the Godwin Hotel, and opened a stage coach line for tourists visiting the Passaic Falls, briefly holding a monopoly. In April 1758, after making a good impression on the Dutch, Abraham was selected Town Collector for the Saddle River Township, now known as Saddle Brook. Godwin became a member of the general committee of local government in 1775.

== Early settlement in New Jersey ==
Godwin's parents came over from England in 1720 and worked as a carpenter for the Dey company in New York City. He visited the Falls of the Passaic and was determined to leave the city to build a new life for himself. Even the natives encouraged him to do so. The Dey company was determined to keep one of their best workers so they offered him all the property west of Broadway and south of Dey street on the southern tip of Manhattan.

In 1755 Abraham Godwin purchased lot Number eight of the Boght Division of the Acquackanonk Patent, (now Riverside), Paterson, New Jersey). Originally, Godwin built a house across the street from the notorious Godwin Hotel (later renamed Passaic Hotel). He brought his family from New York City to the country when the house was finished. The Native-Americans would still come and camp across the river for a few weeks during the summer. They were friendly, and Abraham would give them liquor but told them that it could make them violent. They understood his warnings and would use it to dance. His children would play with the natives and come home covered in paint and pine needle attire.

The Ringwood Iron Works would travel through Paterson to get to the city and over time Abraham got to know the management at the company. They appointed Godwin as an agent to get Iron from the city. He bought a large tract of land on the other side of the river. If the river would become too high to cross, the iron would be stored on this land. He then built two more houses, the Doremus house and the Benson house. The Benson house was demolished in August 1883. When he would go into the city the natives would send warriors to his dwelling to keeps its occupants safe.

He had three sons, Henry, Abraham and David.

== American Revolution ==
Godwin joined the American Revolutionary War in New York on February 13, 1776, after a failed attempt to join in New Jersey. He was declared enemy of the King. Abraham owned considerable real estate, but his creditor from New York City, who was loyal to the King, demanded he pay off his debts. In order to satisfy his creditor, half of his estate was sold to Jacob Van Winkle, a neighbor and well-known Tory. Godwin built another house with a half acre he bought from Abraham Van Houten. Abraham was stationed in New York City as Captain of Marines on board the row galley USS Lady Washington. Godwin was shot sometime around the Battle of Brooklyn, but survived.

Godwin was wounded in 1777 and taken to Fishkill, New York, where he died. He was buried at the Fishkill Supply Depot Burial Ground.

After the war, his son Abraham Godwin reclaimed the family Hotel and estate. He ran the Hotel very successfully until his death in 1835.

== Memorial ==
There is a rock in Paterson's Eastside Park with a plaque on it placed in his honor placed by the Captain Abraham Godwin Chapter of the Sons of the American Revolution.

== See also ==
- Battle of Fort Lee
- Totowa section
