= Billy Goat Trail =

Hiking Trail in Montgomery County, Maryland, US

Coordinates: 38.9938°N 77.2458°W

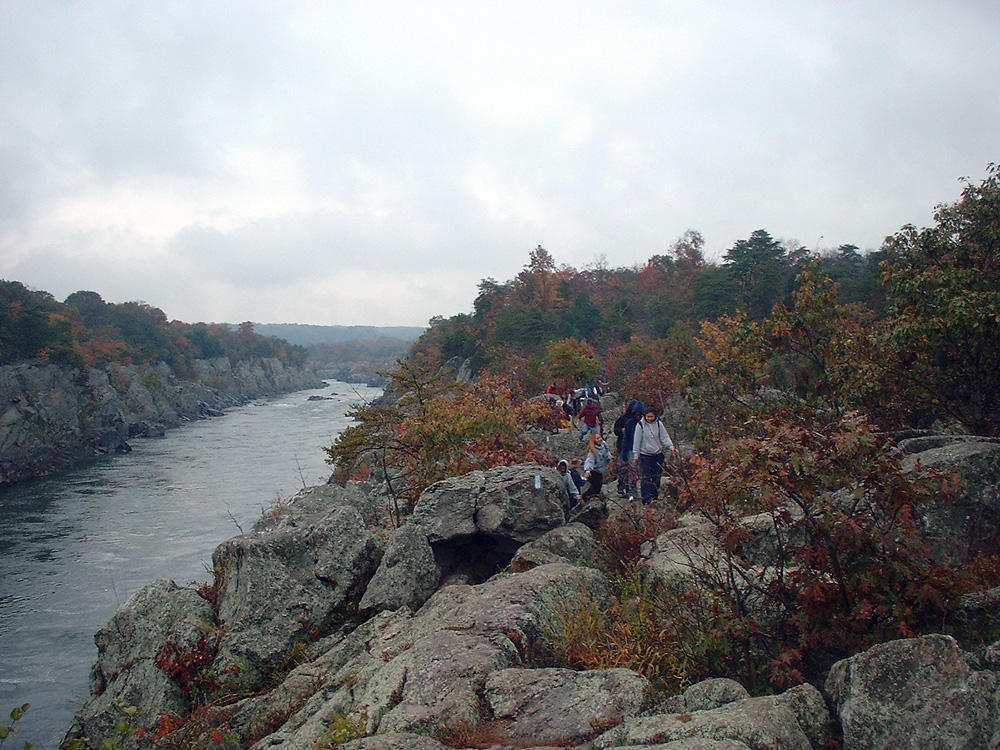
- Scrambling over boulders on Section A. Mather Gorge at left.
- Length: 4.7 mi (7.6 km)
- Location: Montgomery County, Maryland, United States
- Trailheads: C&O Canal; Bear Island
- Use: Hiking Trail Running
- Difficulty: Strenuous (Section A); Moderate (Section B); Easy (Section C)
- Season: All year
- Sights: Chesapeake and Ohio Canal National Historical Park

The Billy Goat Trail is a 4.7-mile (7.6 km) hiking trail that follows a path between the C&O Canal and the Potomac River within the Chesapeake and Ohio Canal National Historical Park near the Great Falls in Montgomery County, Maryland. The trail has three sections: Section A, the northernmost, is 1.7 miles (2.7 km); Section B is 1.4 miles (2.3 km); and Section C, the southernmost, is 1.6 miles (2.6 km)

== Description ==
The Billy Goat Trail was laid out by the YMCA Triangle Club in 1919.

Section A of the trail, by far the most popular, is on Bear Island and traverses rough and rocky terrain, including a steep climb along a cliff face along the Potomac River's Mather Gorge. At another point in the trail, hikers are required to scramble over and around huge boulders. Sections B and C are less strenuous; section B requires only one brief scramble, and section C has none. Most of the trail is well marked with light blue trail blazes.

Section A is best accessed from the Great Falls Tavern Visitor Center. Section B and Section C are best accessed from the Carderock Recreation Area. All sections of the trail are free, although an entrance fee ($20 per car in 2021) is charged when entering and parking near the Great Falls Tavern Visitor Center. No fee is charged when parking near Carderock. Dogs are not allowed on Section A, nor on Olmsted Island (location of the Great Falls overlook), but are permitted on a leash at all times everywhere else in the park. It takes about 2 1/2 hours to walk the Section A loop from the parking lot.

The three sections of the trail do not directly connect with each other, but are connected to each other by the towpath along the C&O Canal. The end point of section C is about 2.75 miles (4.4 km) southeast along the towpath from the starting point of section A.

== Section A gallery ==
Pictures are approximately upstream to downstream on the trail.

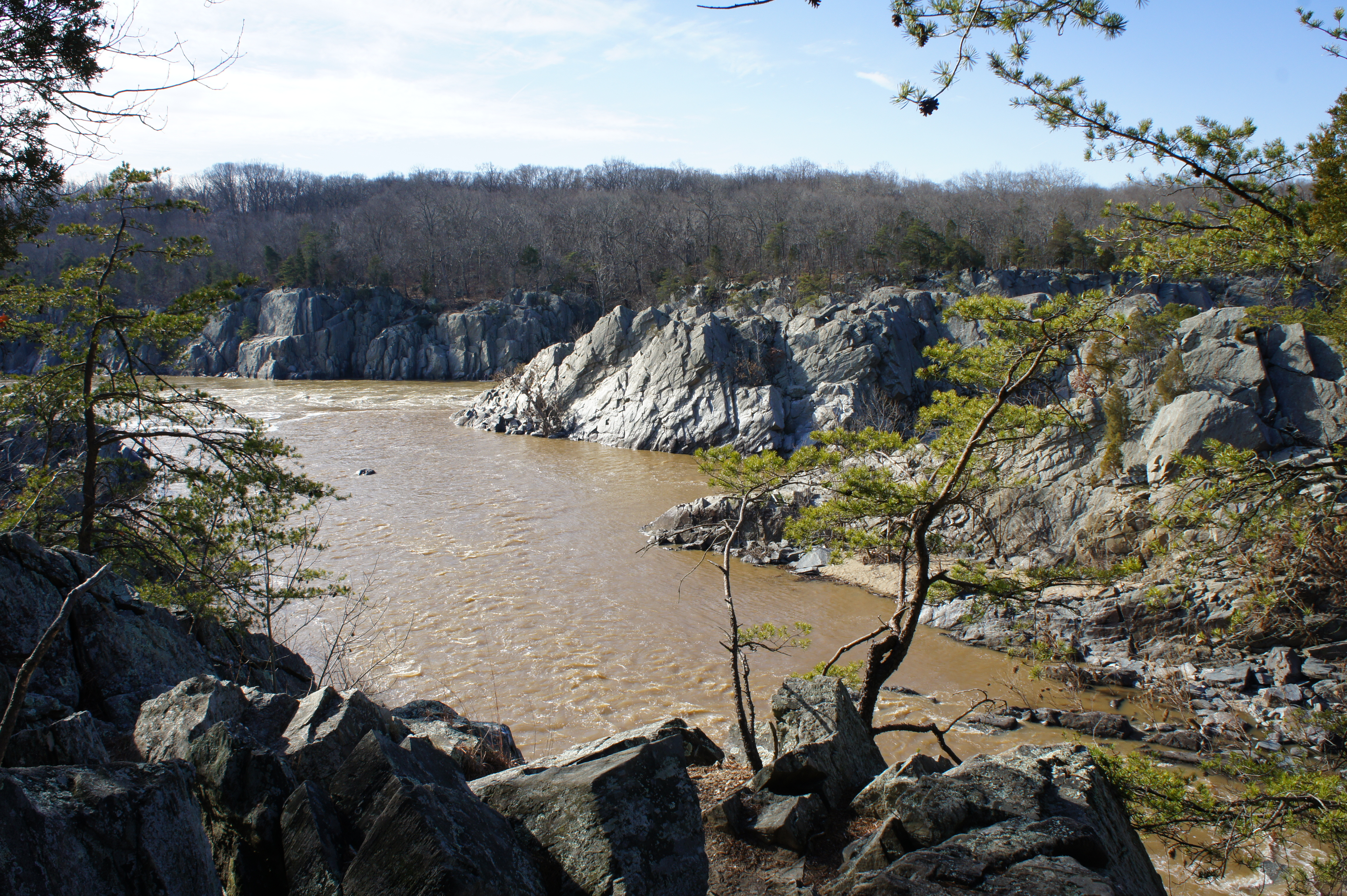
River View from trail

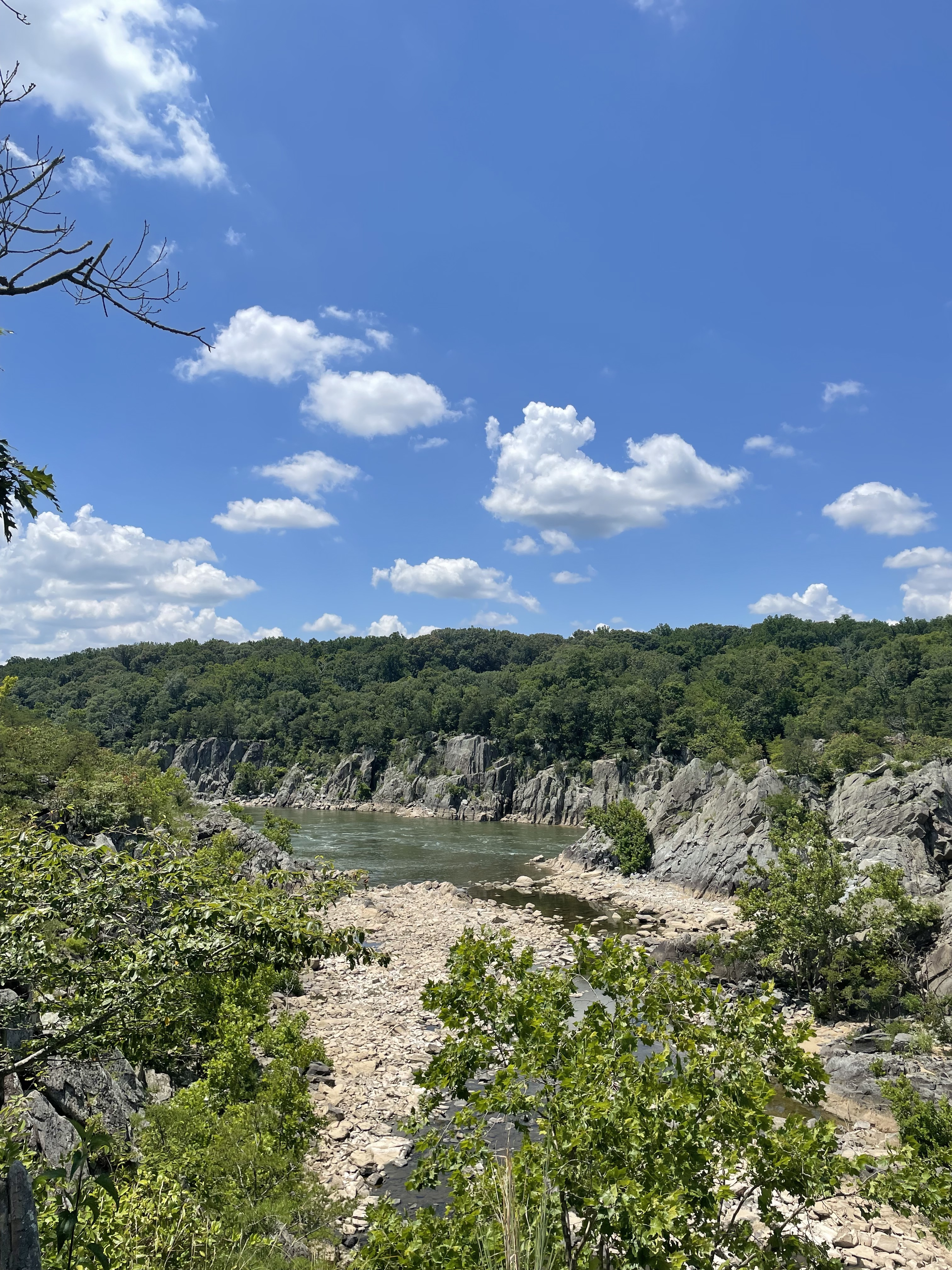
View of the Potomac River from Trail (via Bear Island)

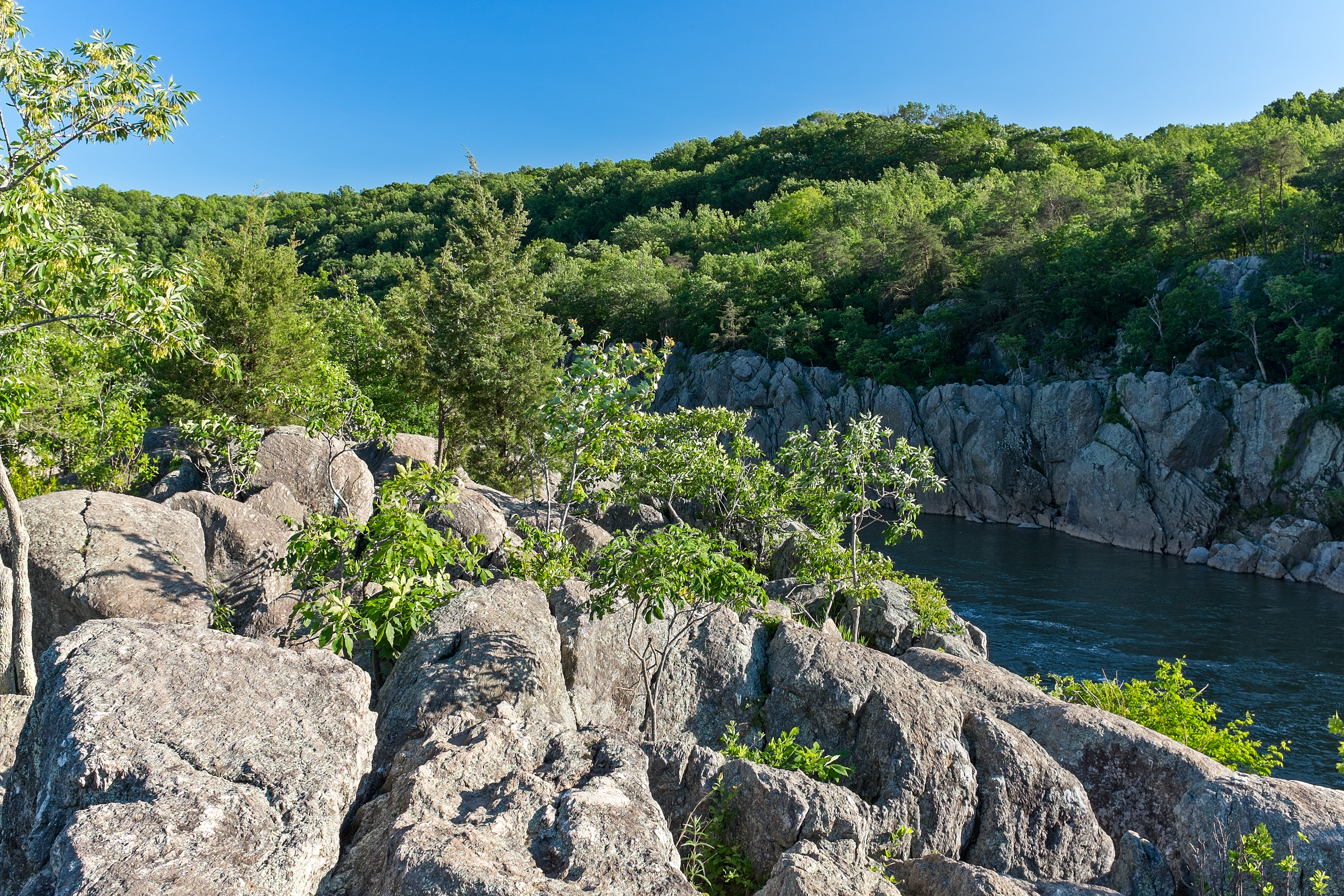
View of Pothole Alley, with Mather Gorge

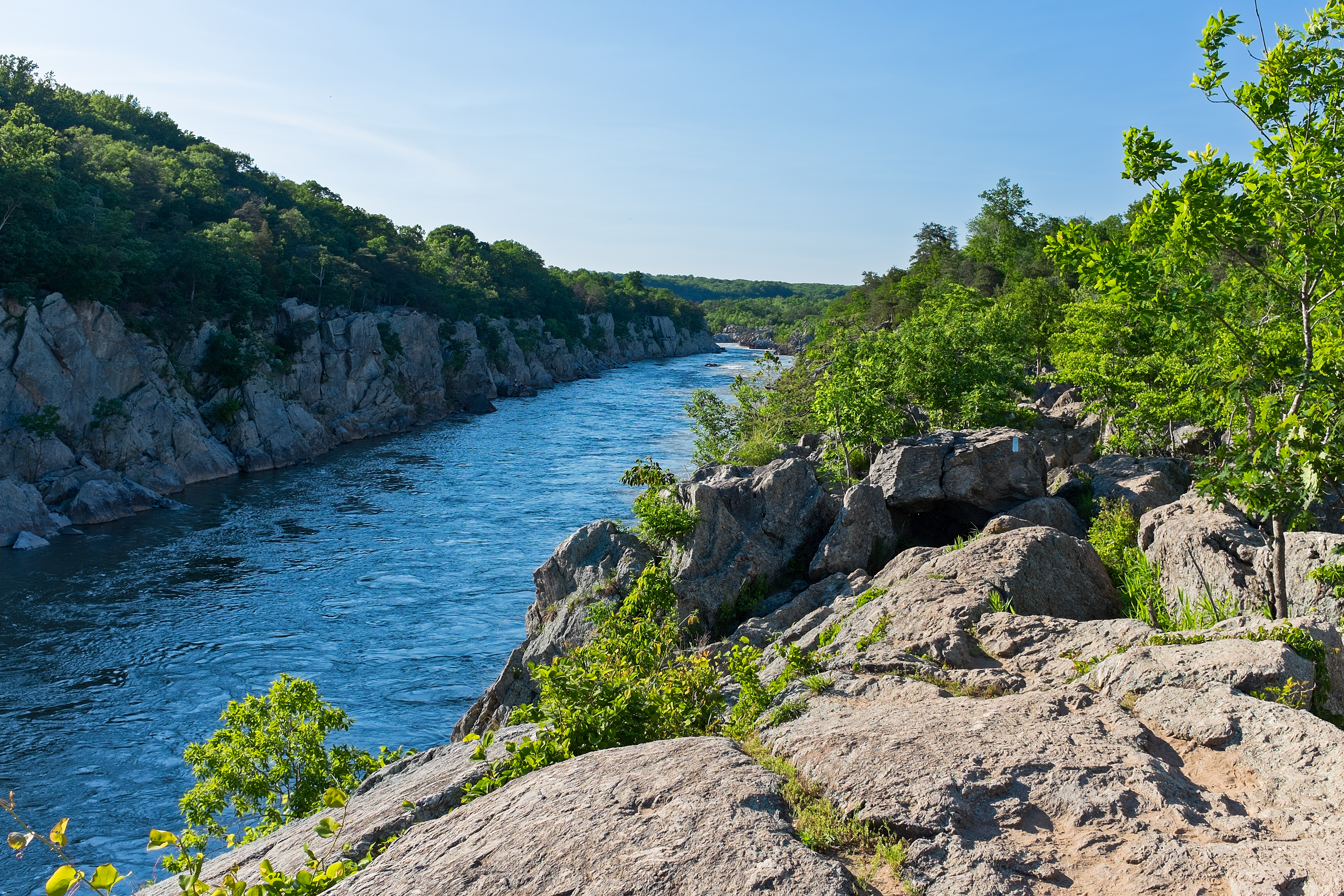
Pothole Alley, a little to the south of the first view

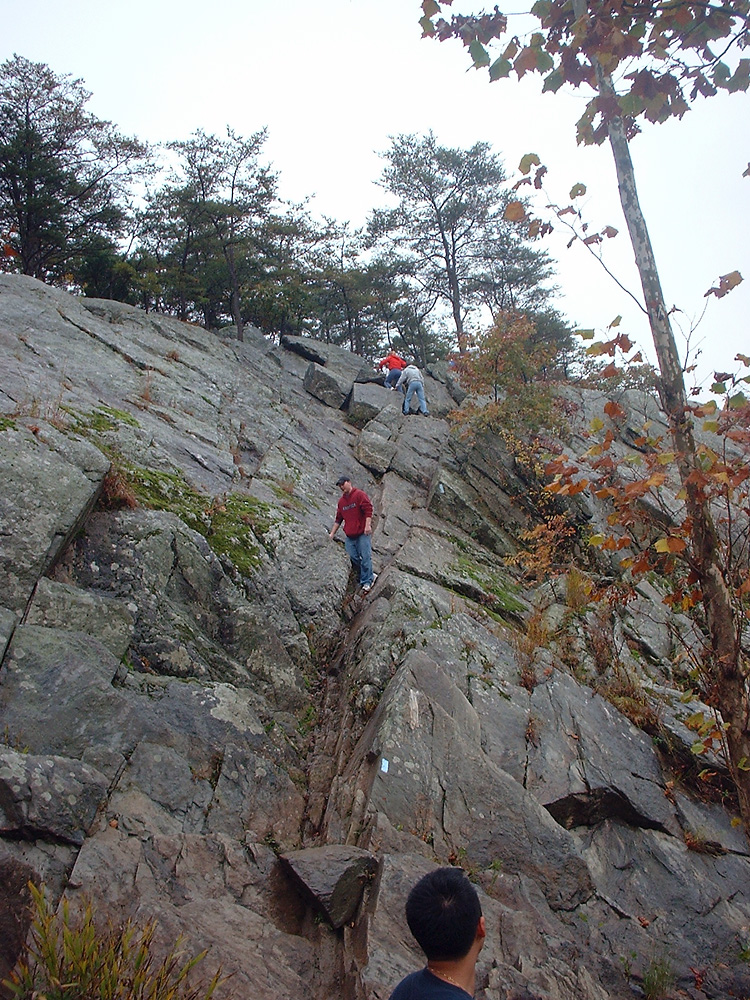
Steep cliff face on Section A of the trail

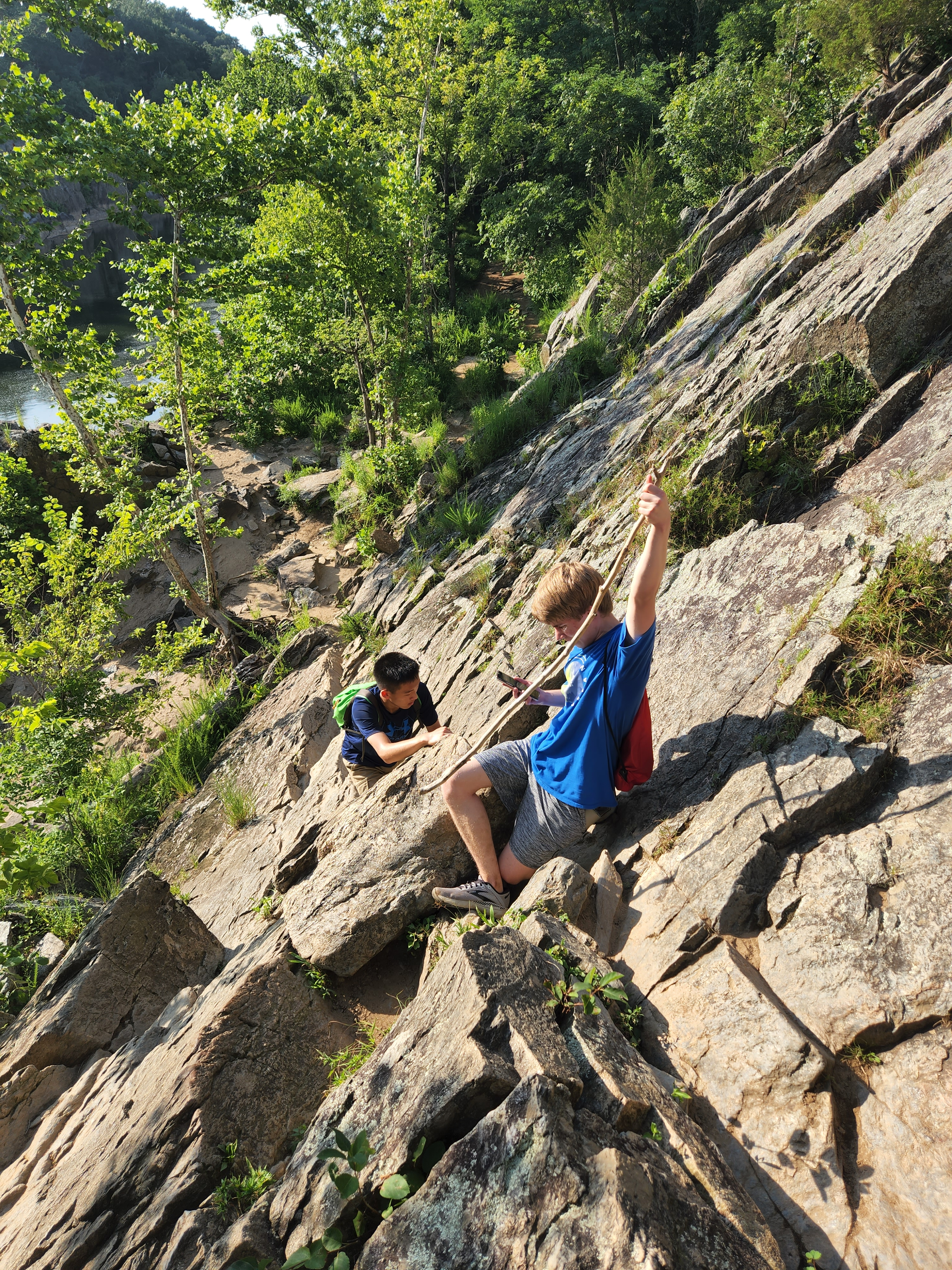
View down the cliff face

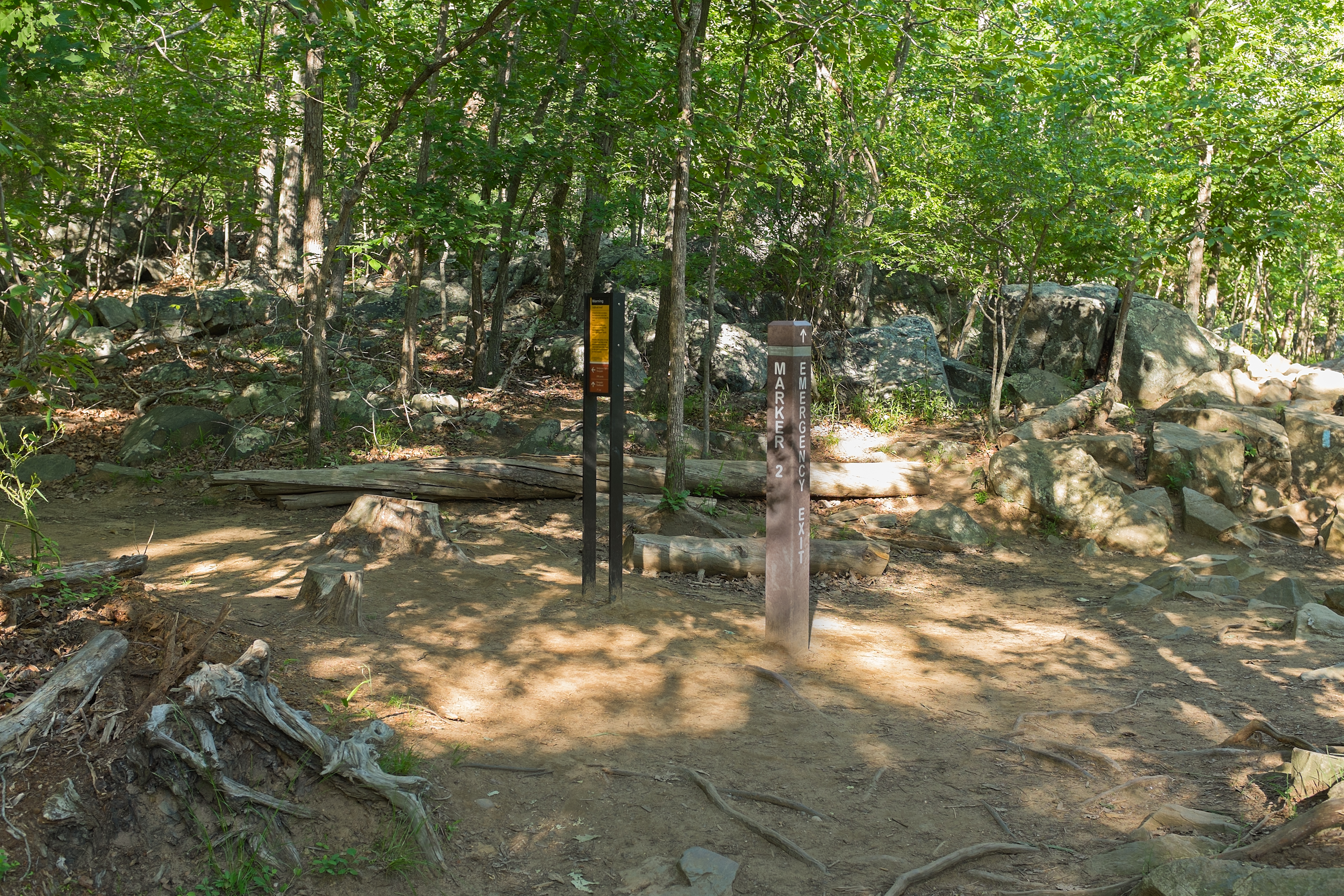
Marker 2, about halfway through the trail. To the left goes the Emergency Exit trail

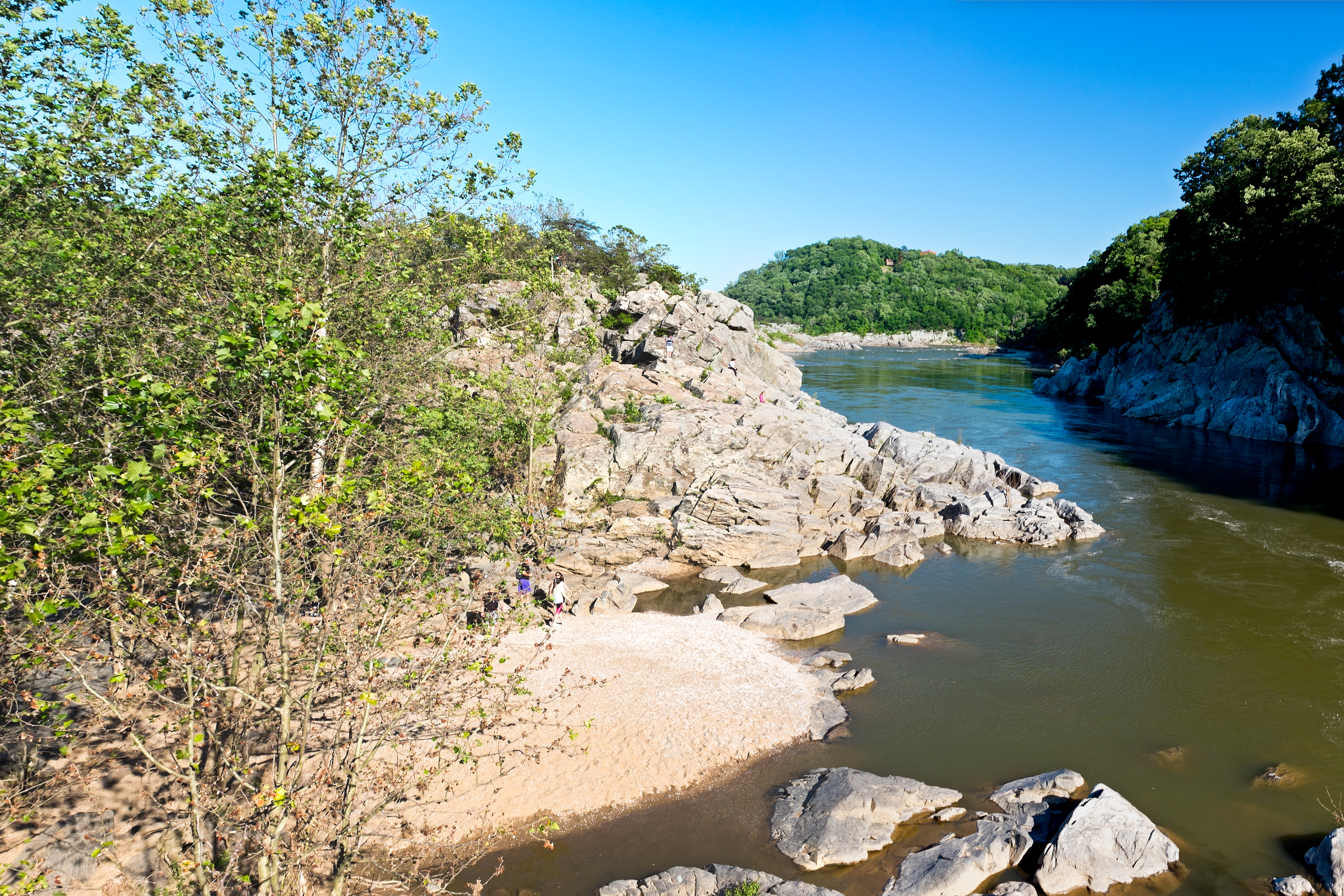
View of Purplehorse "Beach" from above

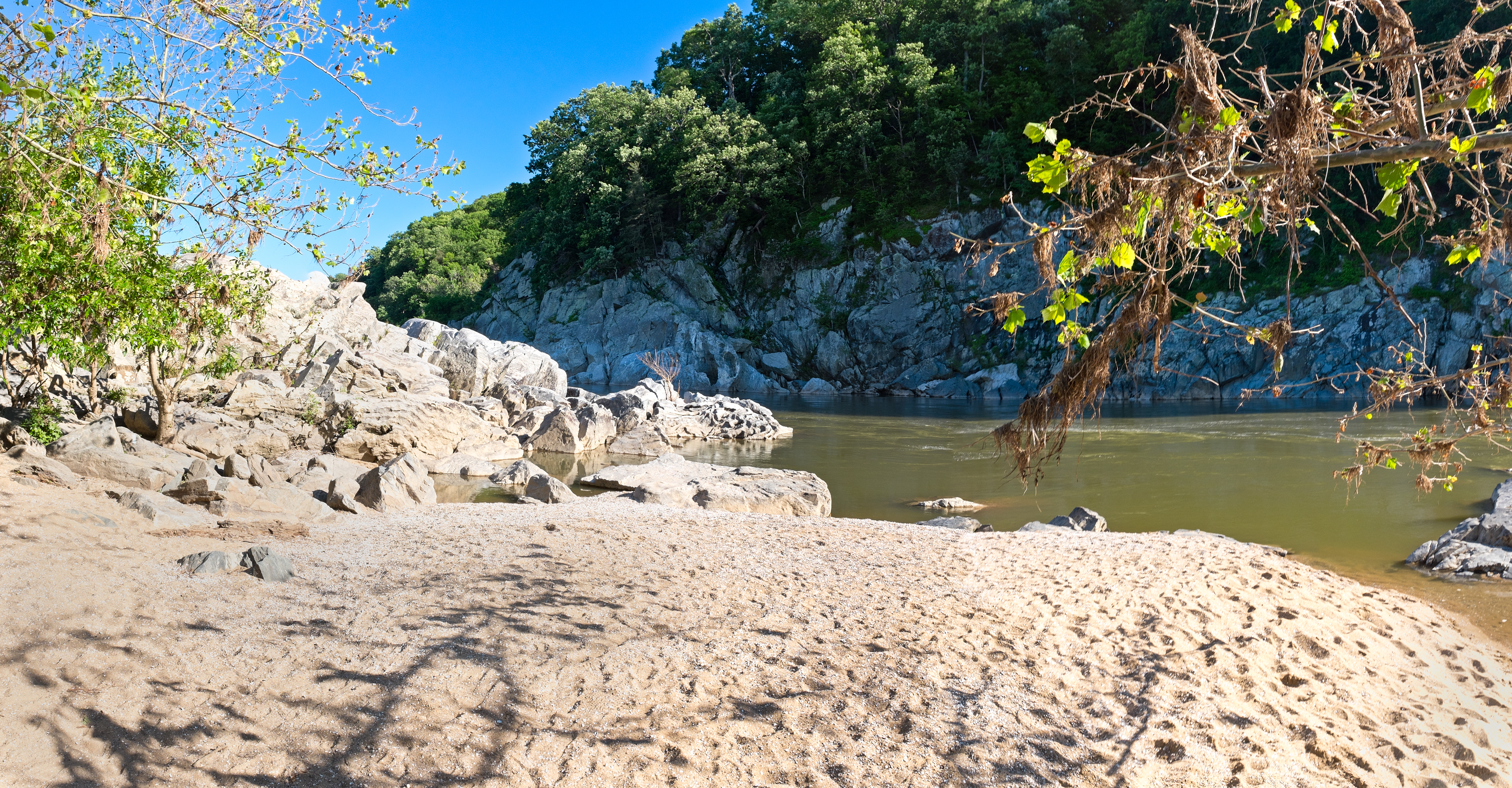
The Purplehorse "Beach". No swimming here: river is dangerous and people drown.

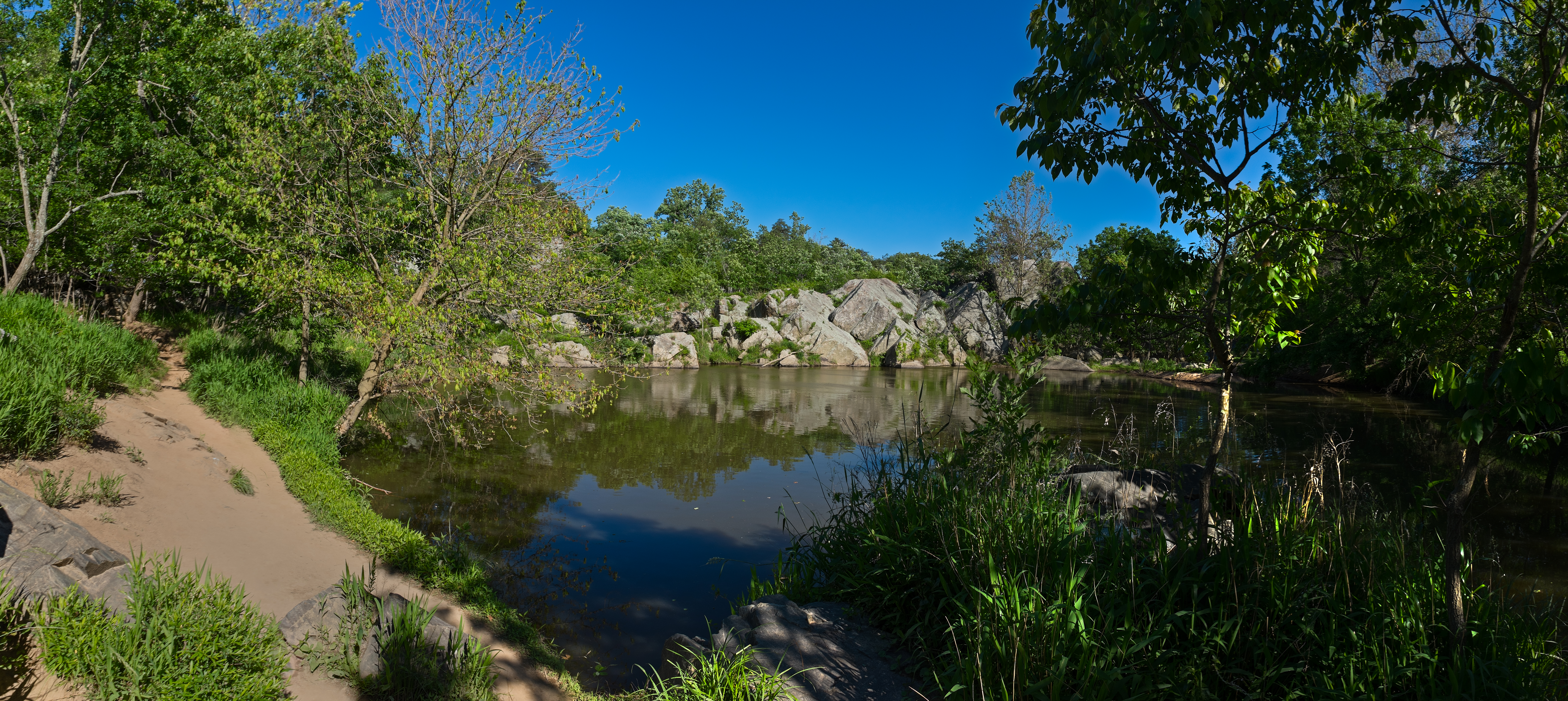
Beaver Pond along the trail

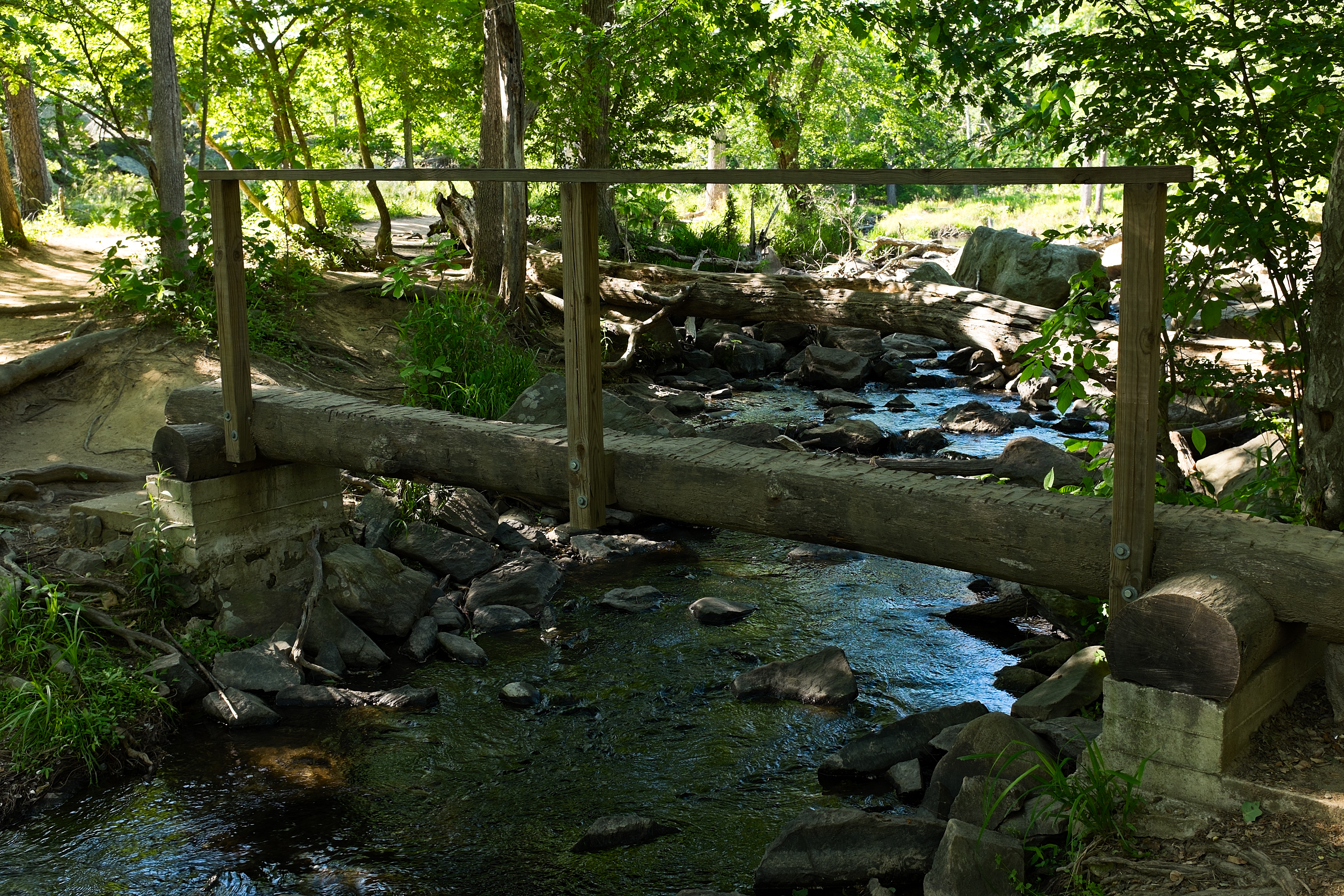
Log bridge at Marker 3

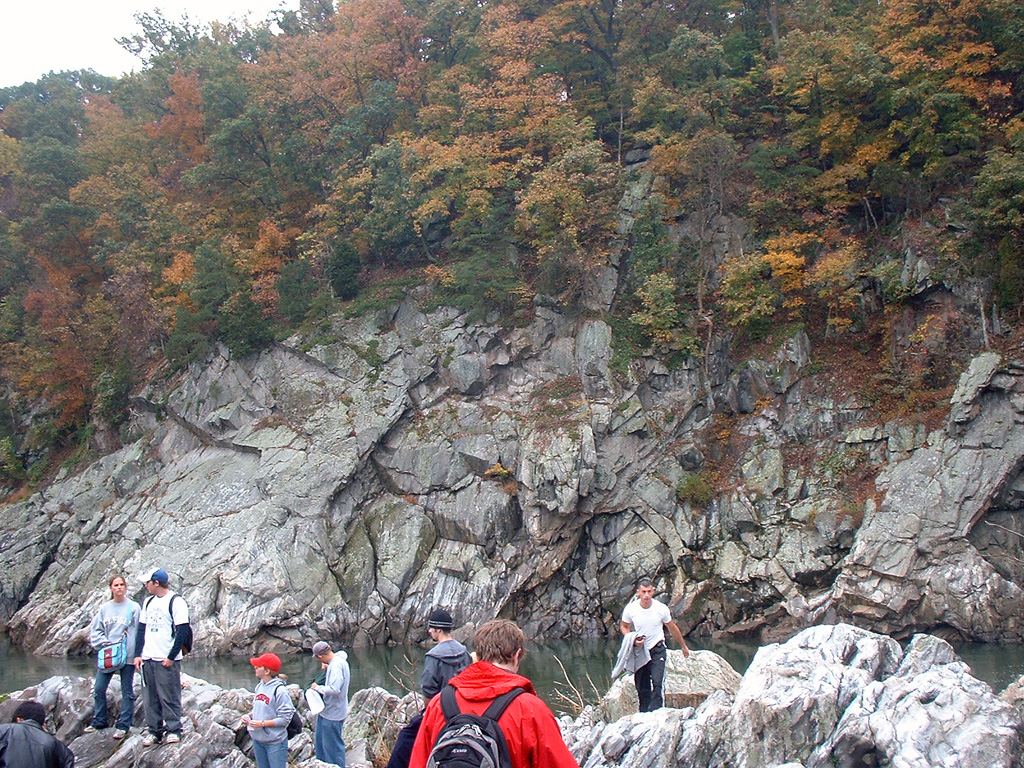
View from the trail

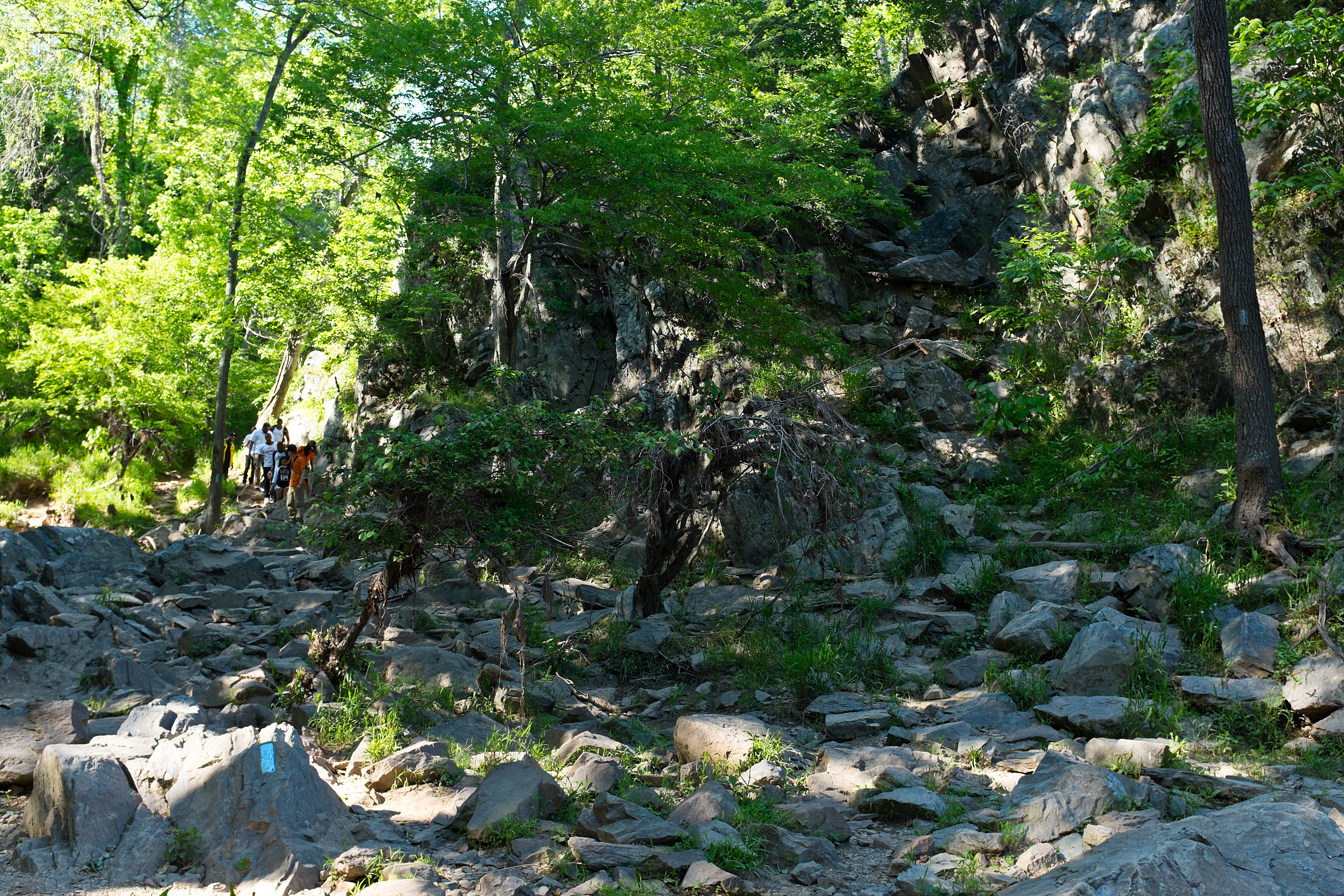
Trail crosses stream near downstream end

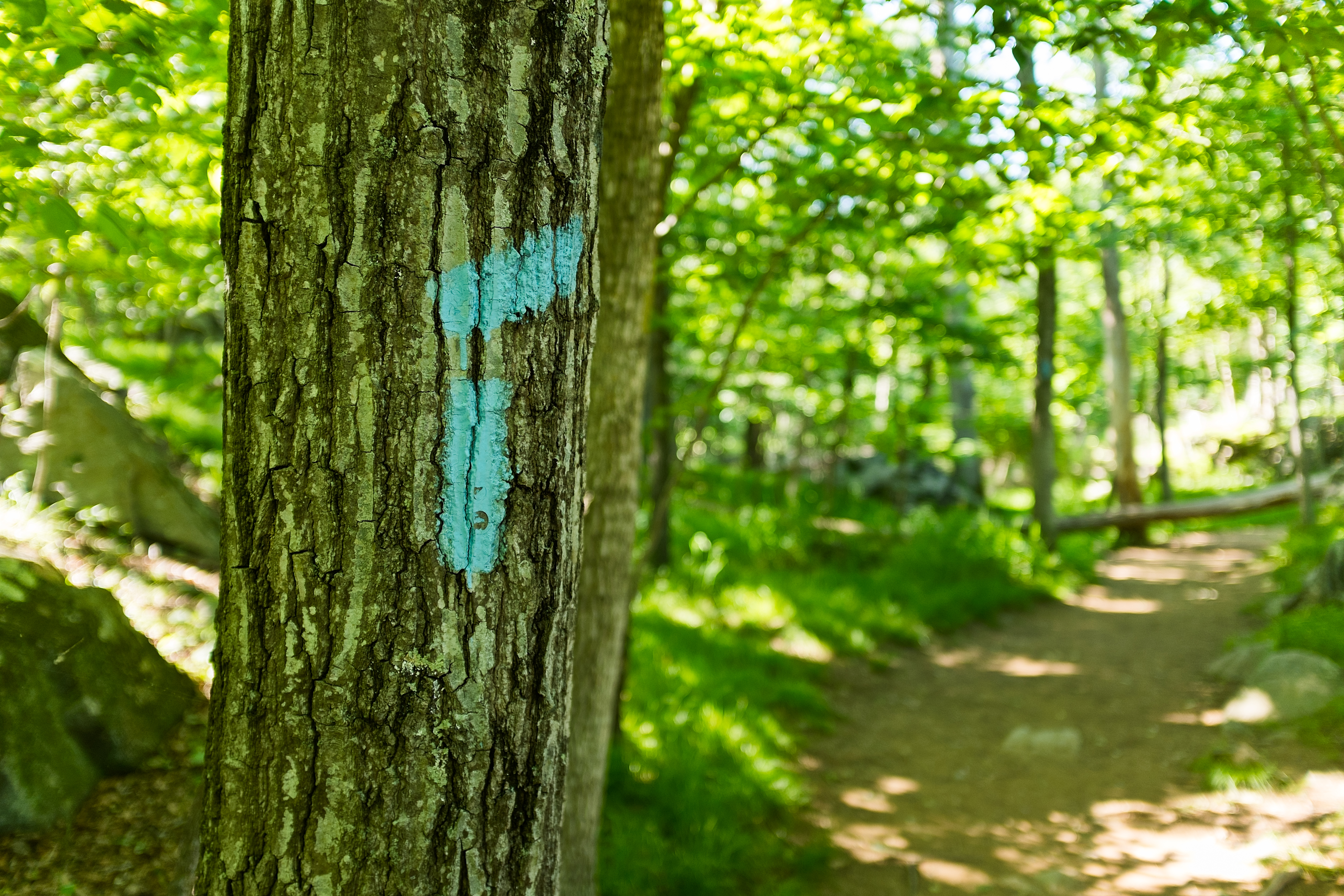
Trail goes to right here

== Section B gallery ==
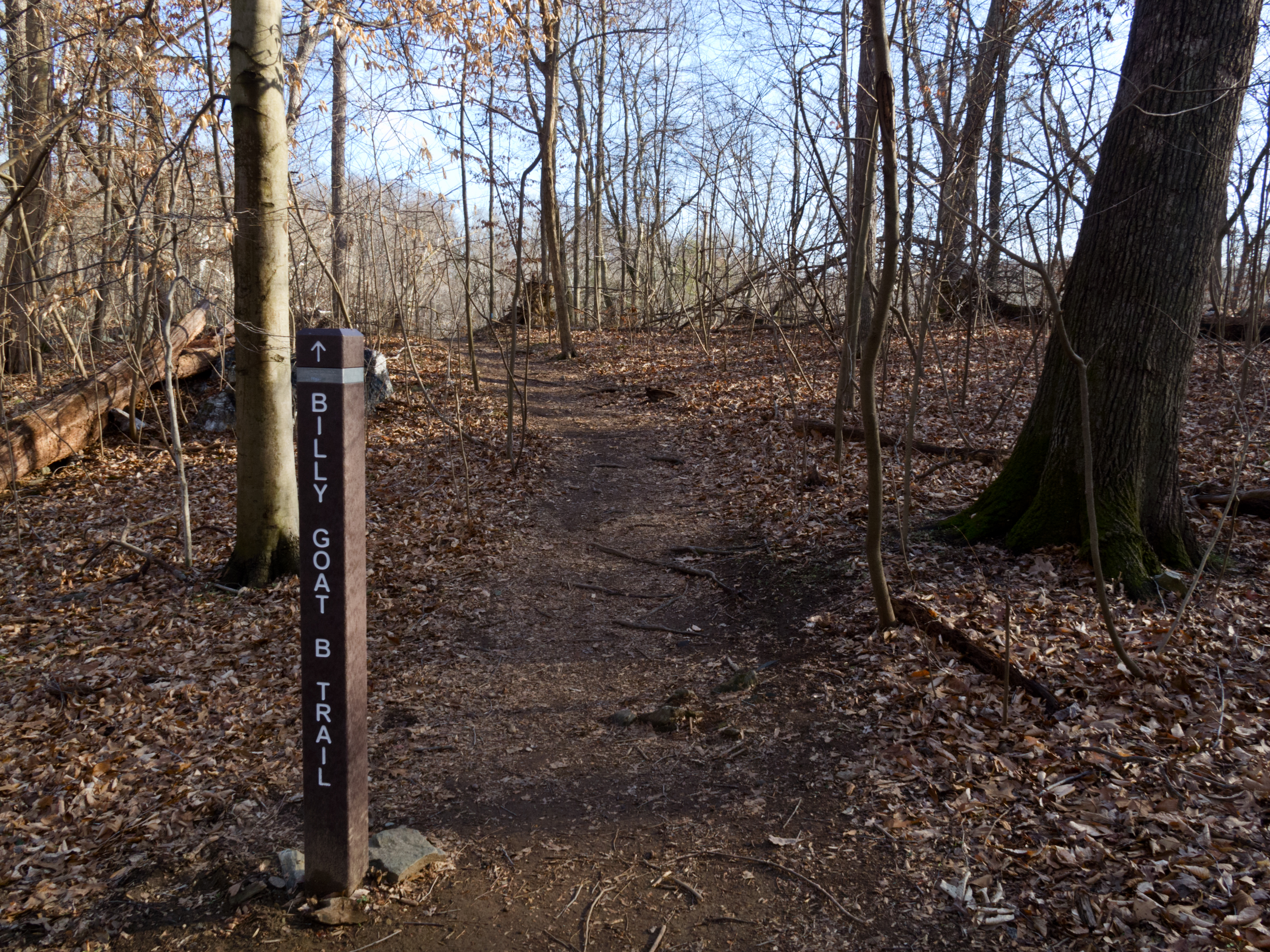
Downstream entrance of the B trail, just above Carderock

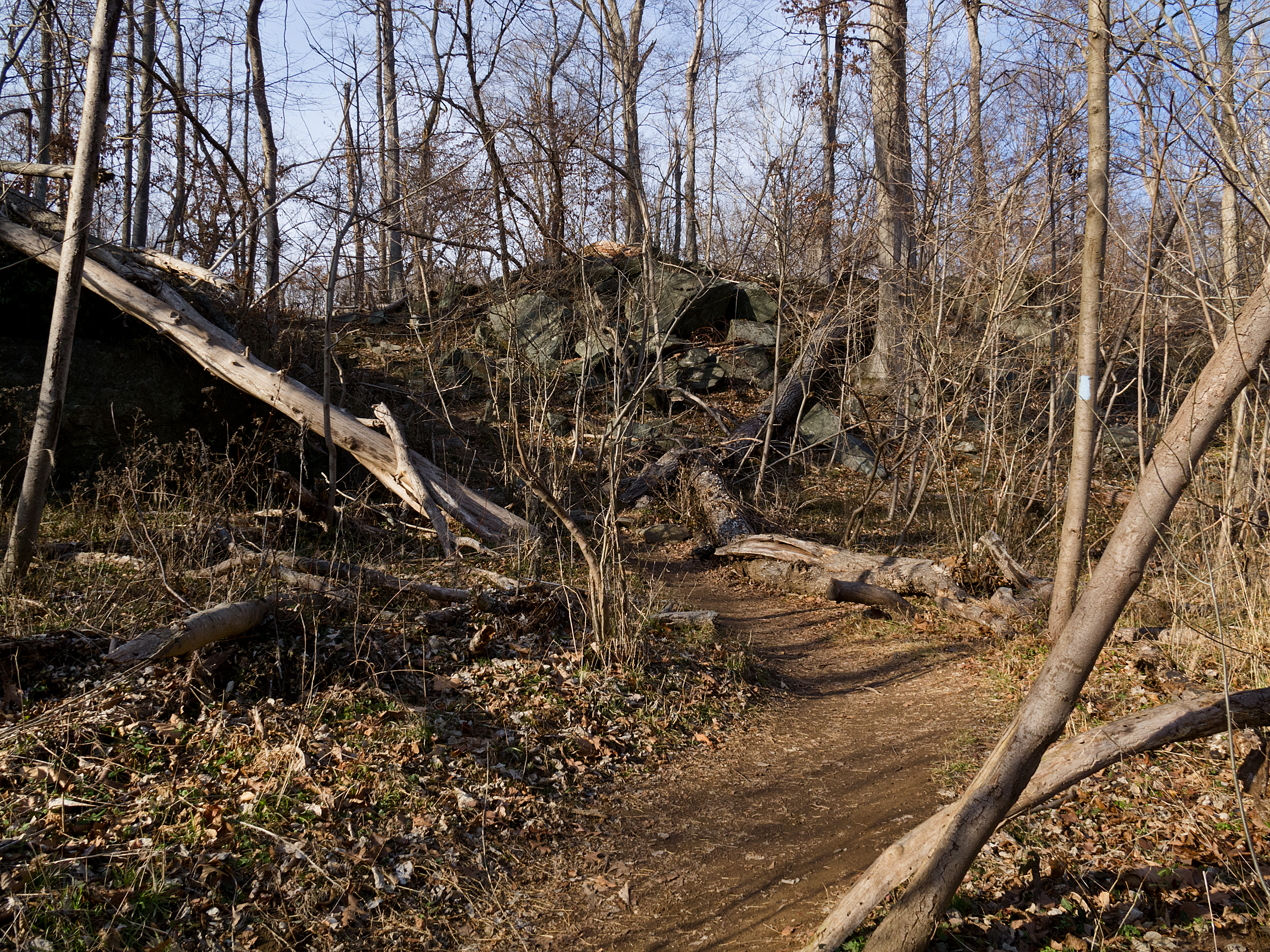
B trail in winter

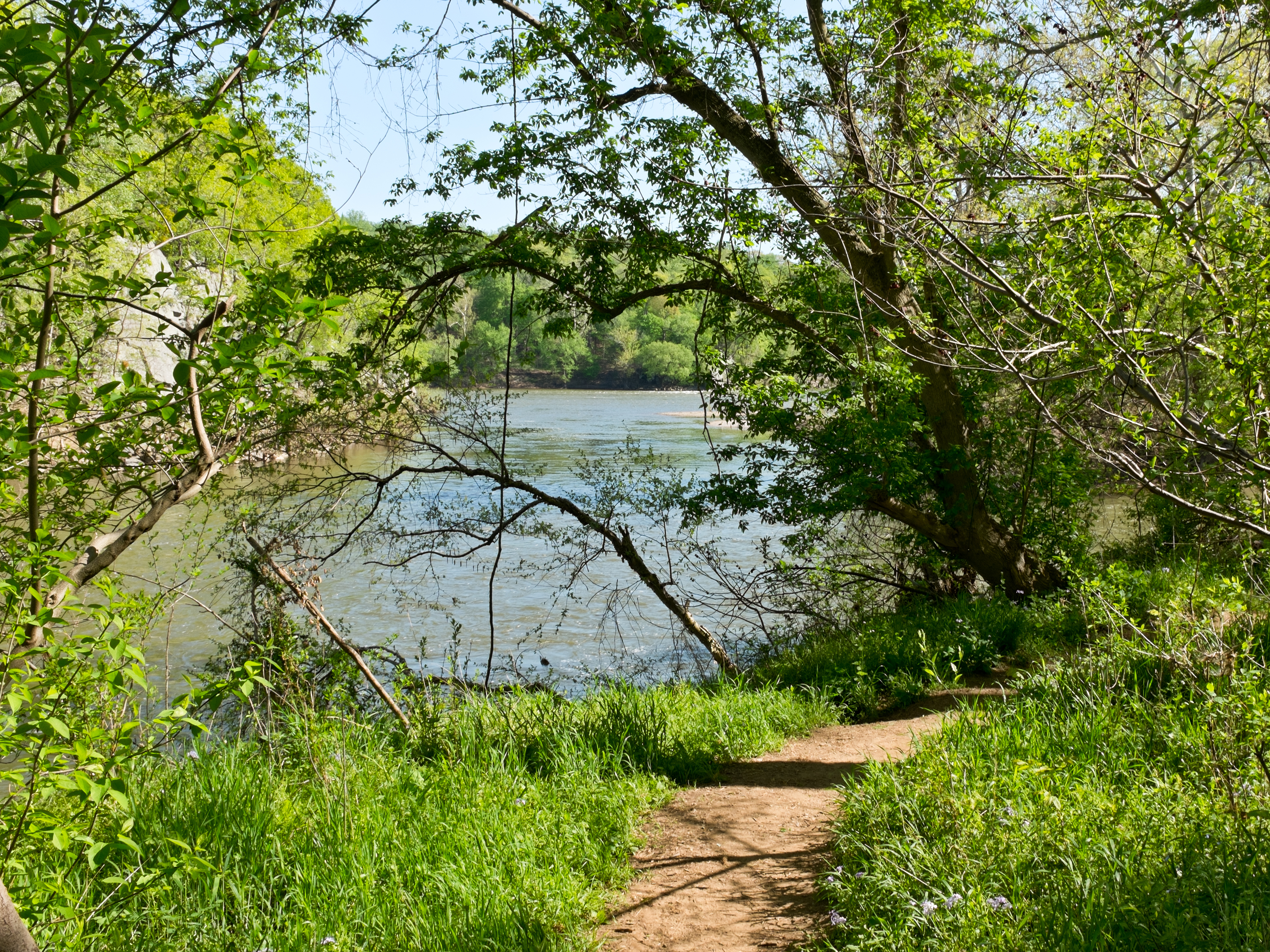
B trail, near the downstream entrance

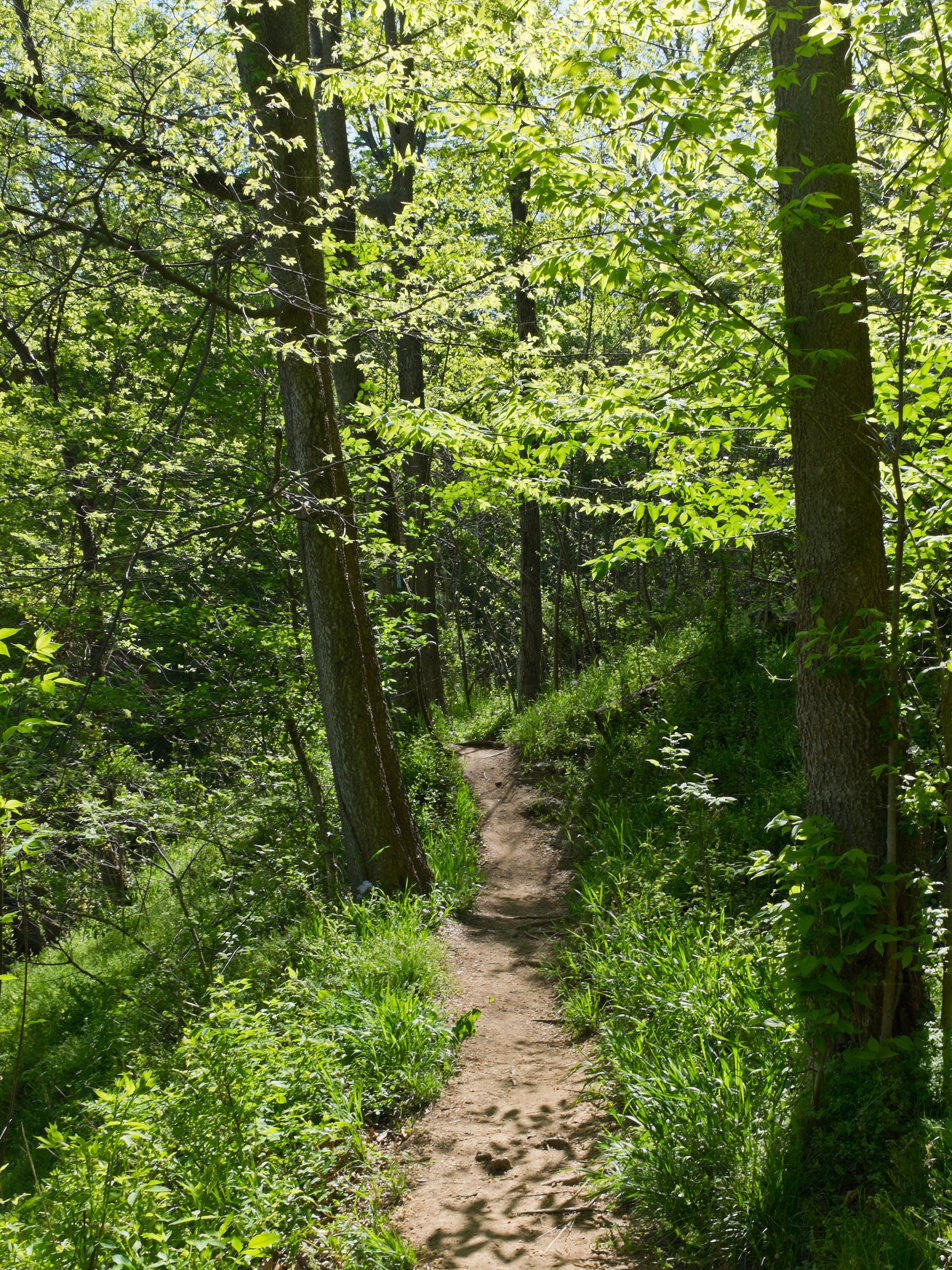
B trail

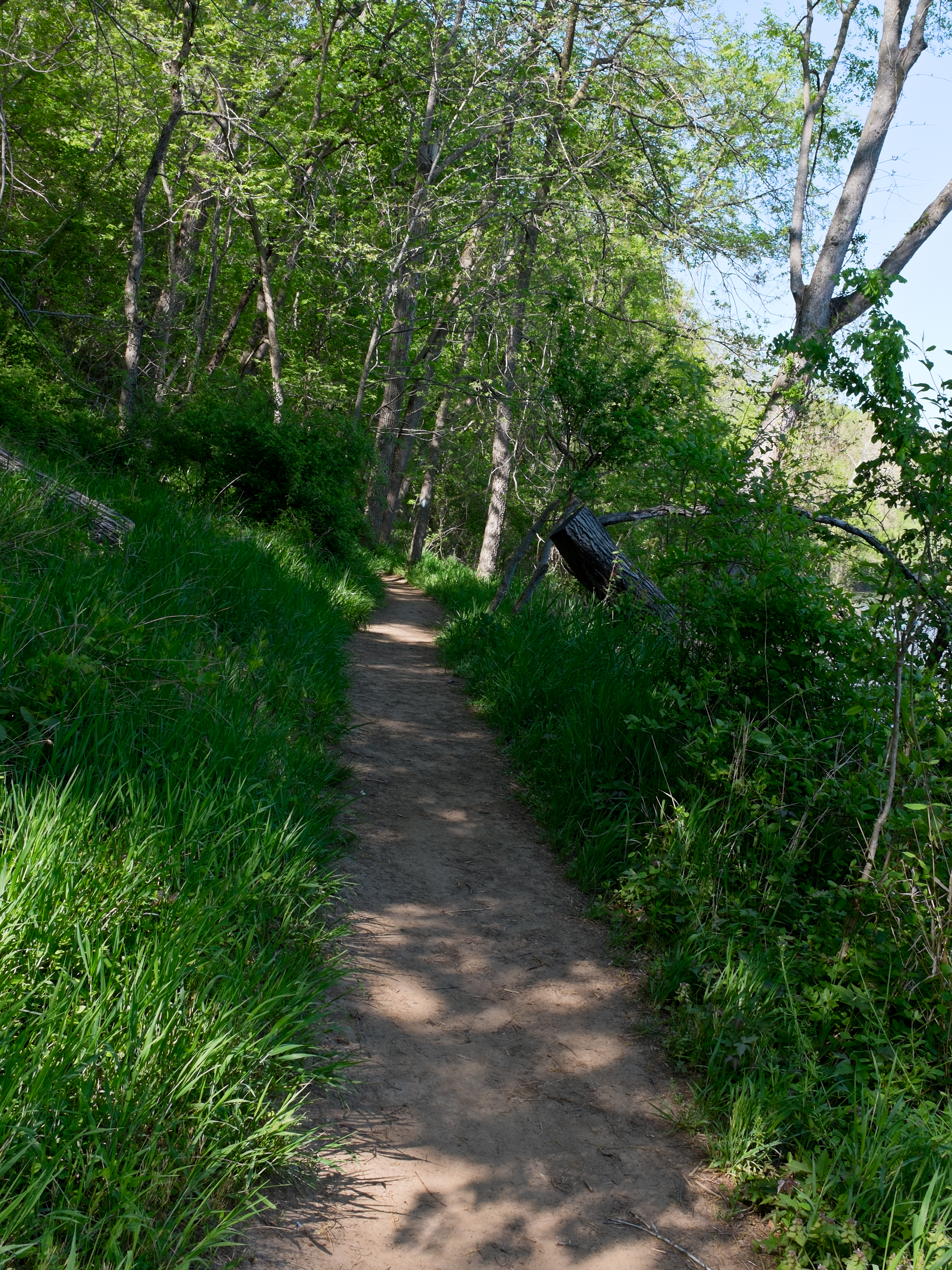
B trail, Potomac River on the right

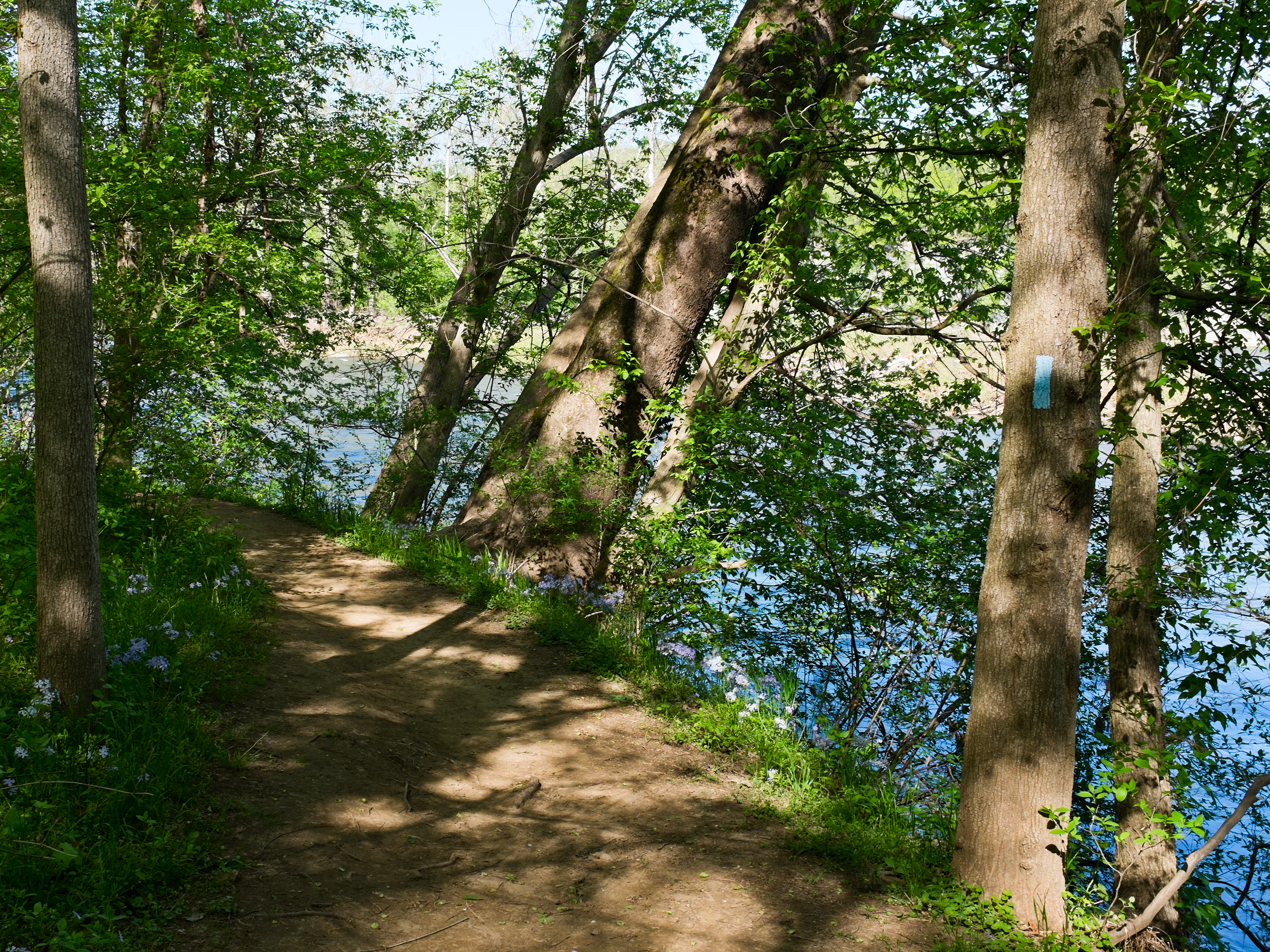
B trail, Potomac River to the right, through the trees

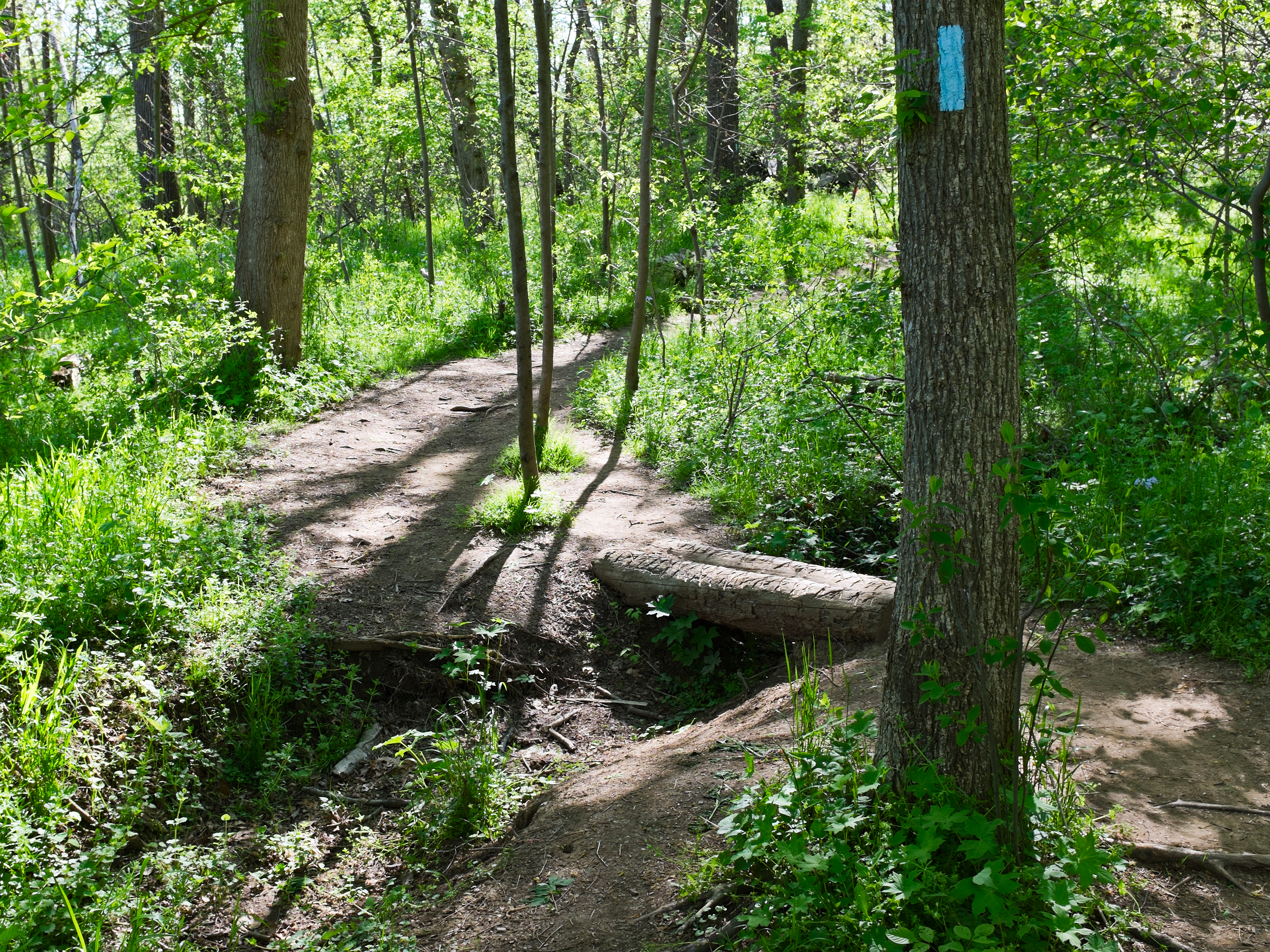
B trail crossing a small gully with log bridge

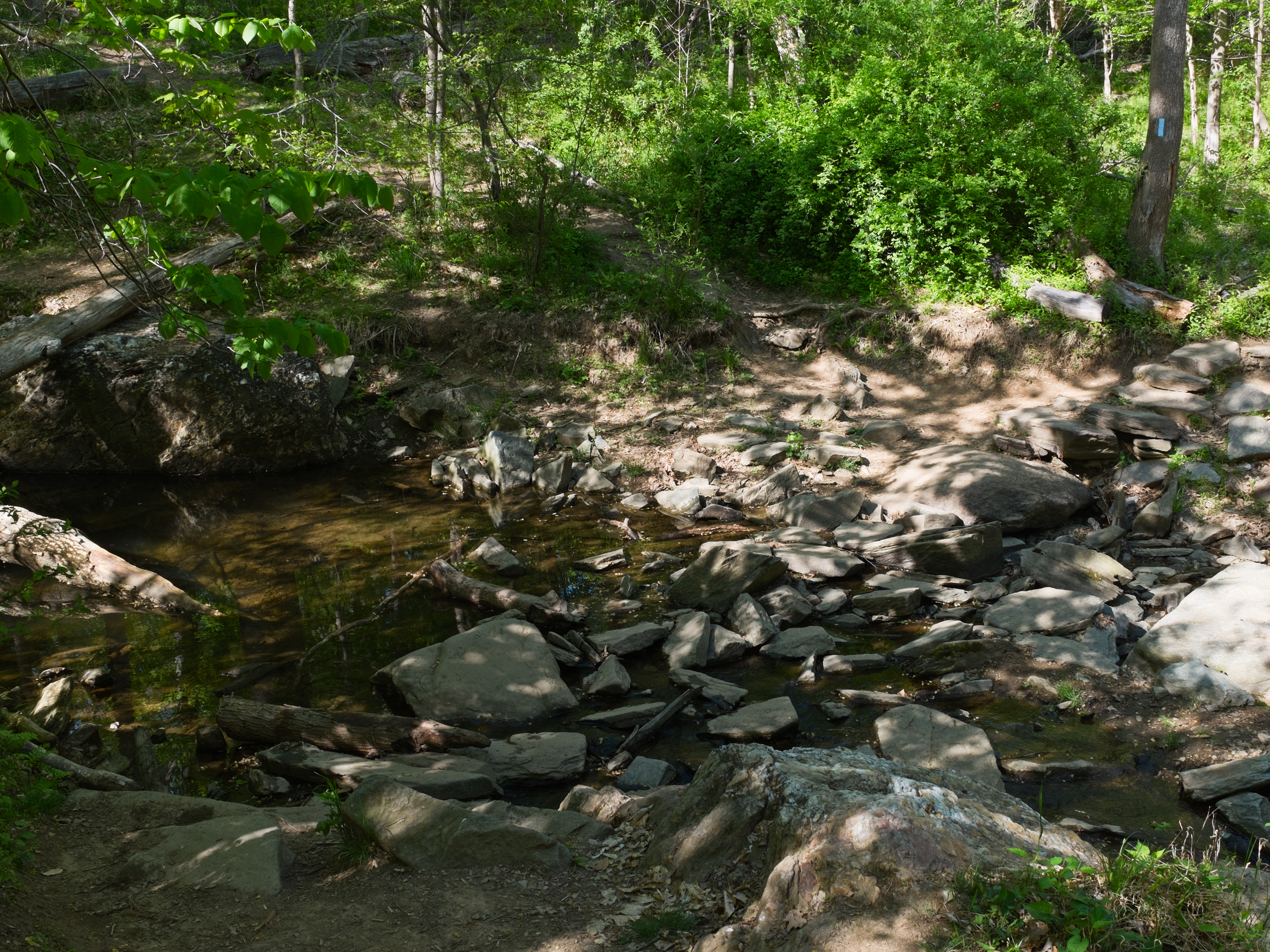
The B trail crosses a small stream

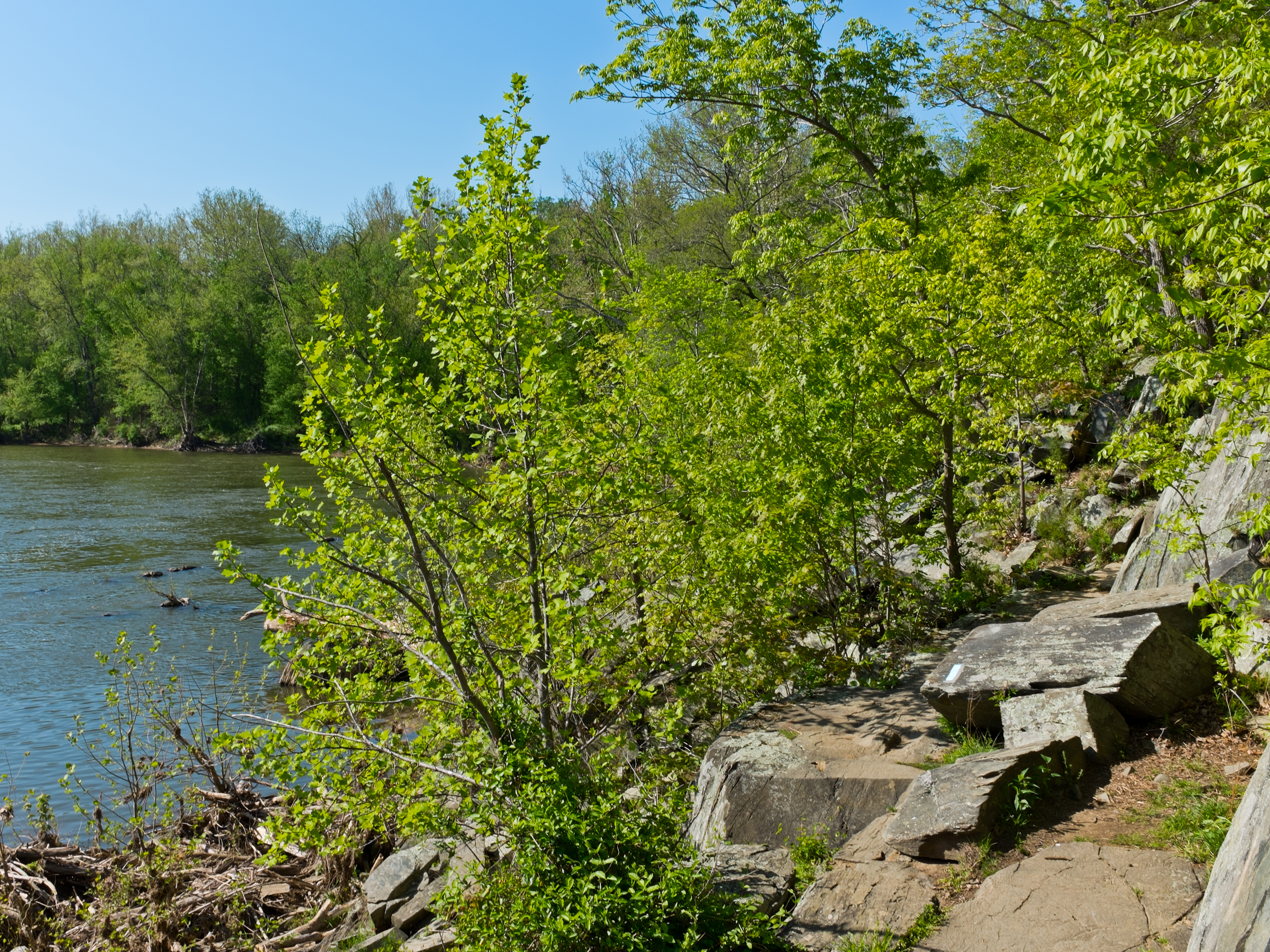
View of Potomac river from B trail

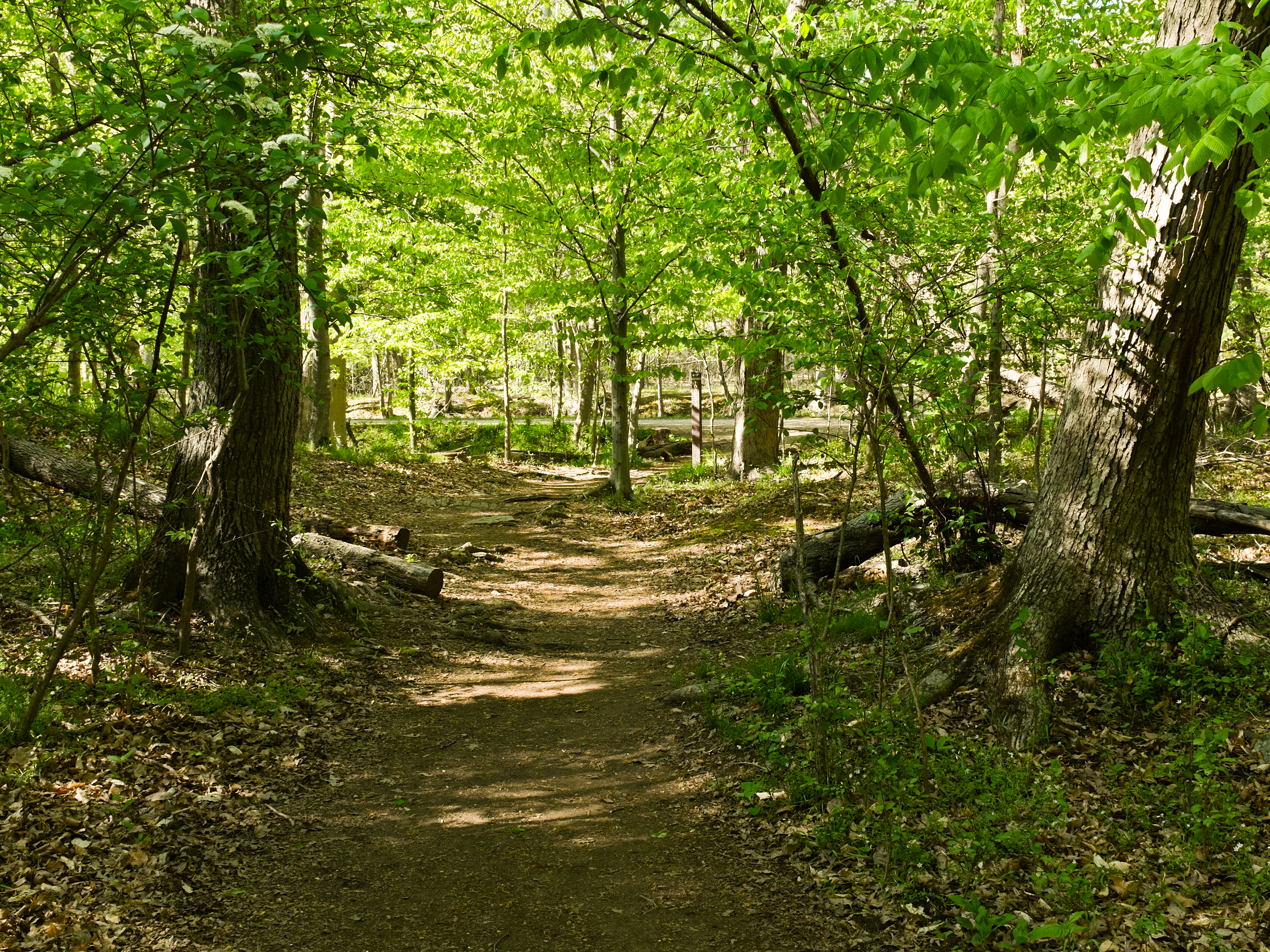
Upstream entrance of the B trail, with the C&O Canal towpath in the background

== Section C gallery ==
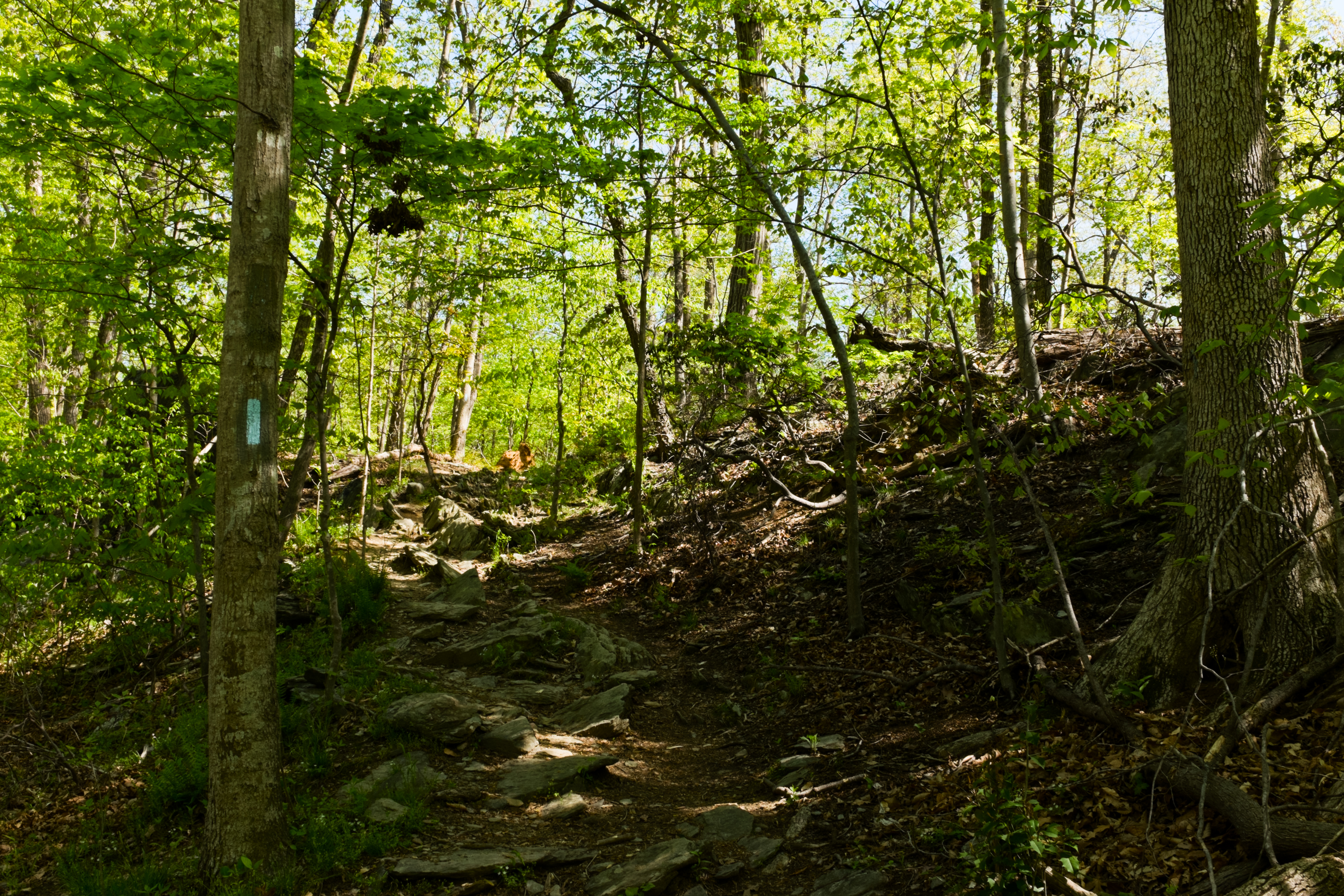
C section, near upstream end at canal

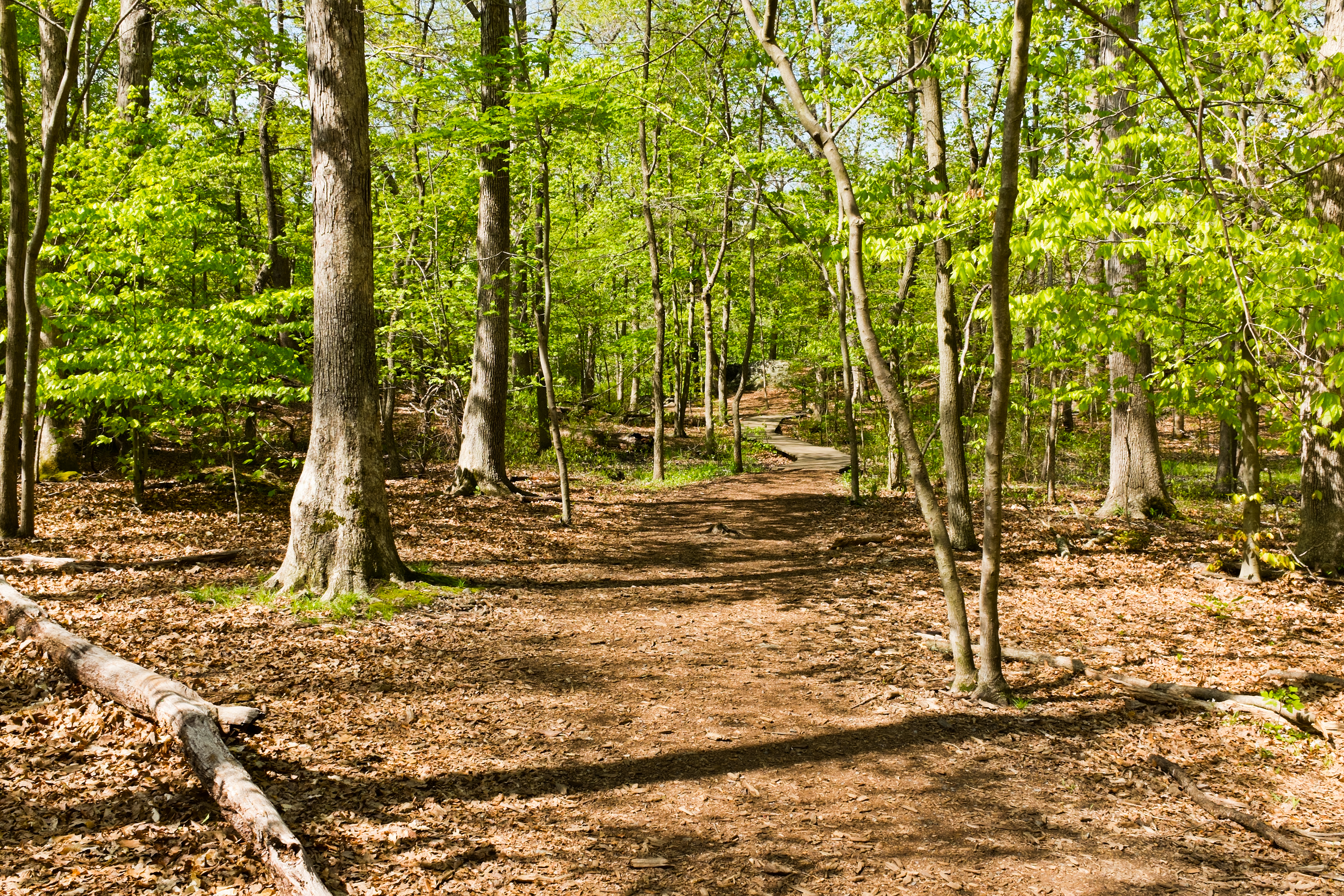
One of the approaches to the C trail, from the western parking lot

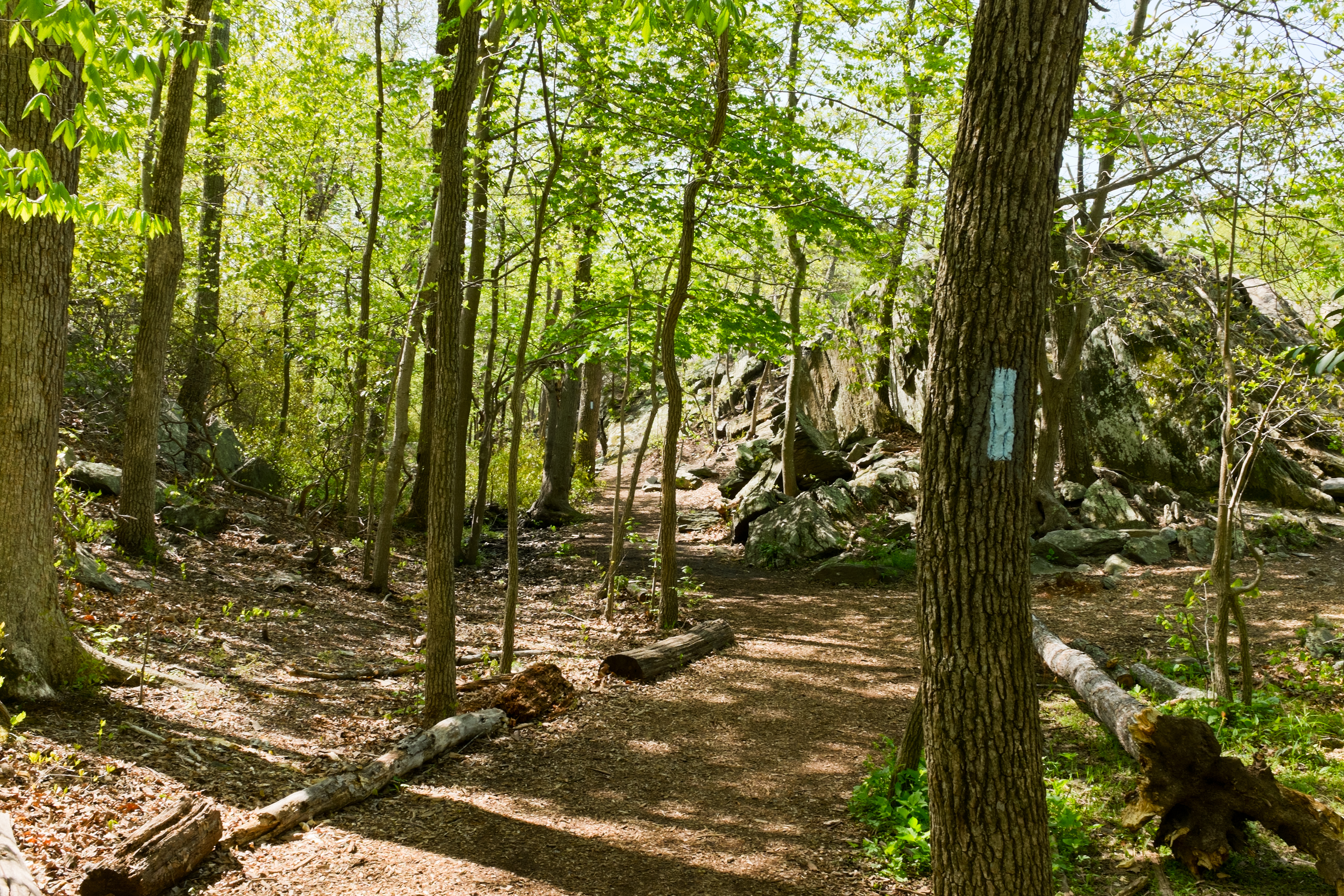
Part of the C trail in Carderock

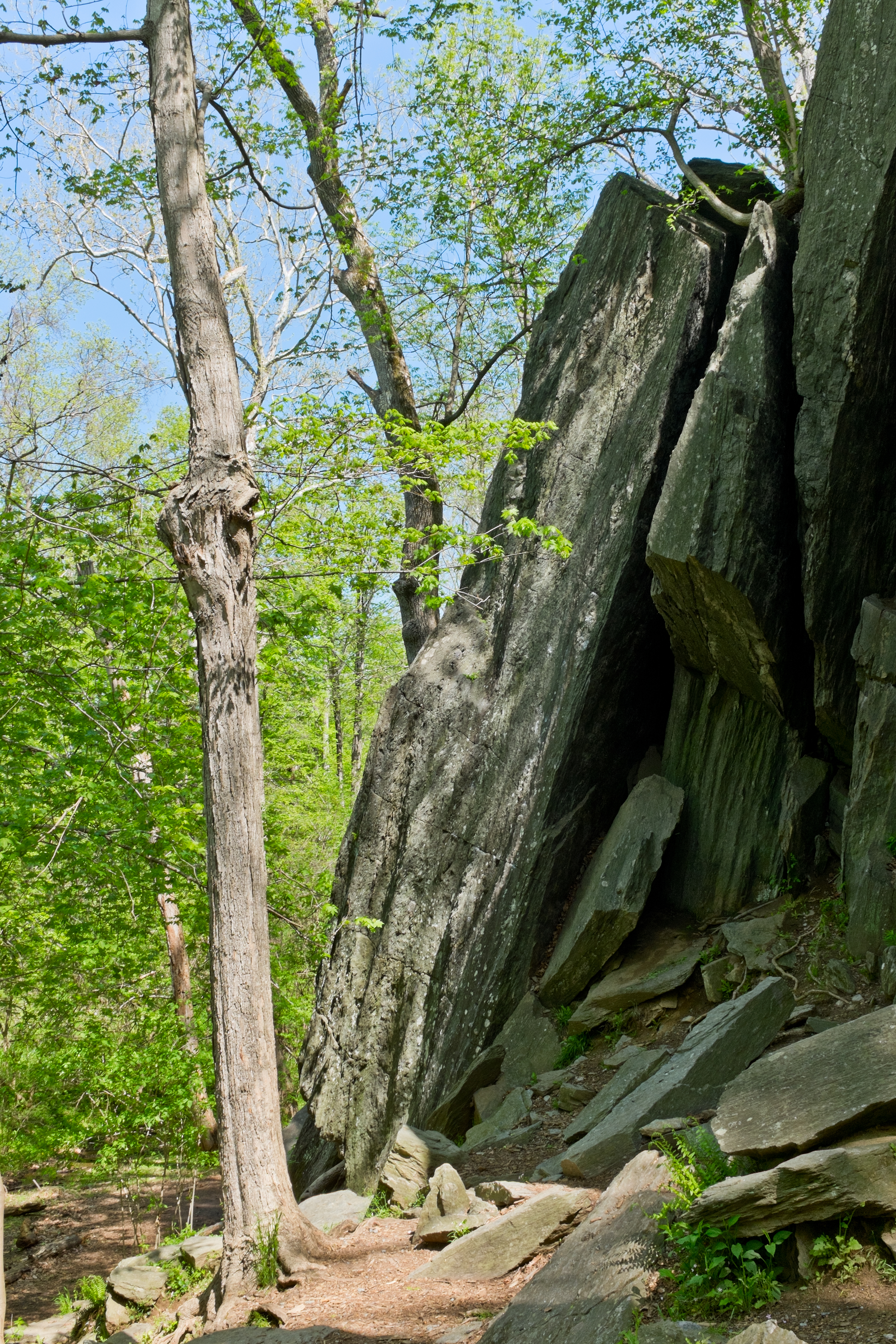
Cliffs of Billy Goat C trail, a favorite spot of rock climbers

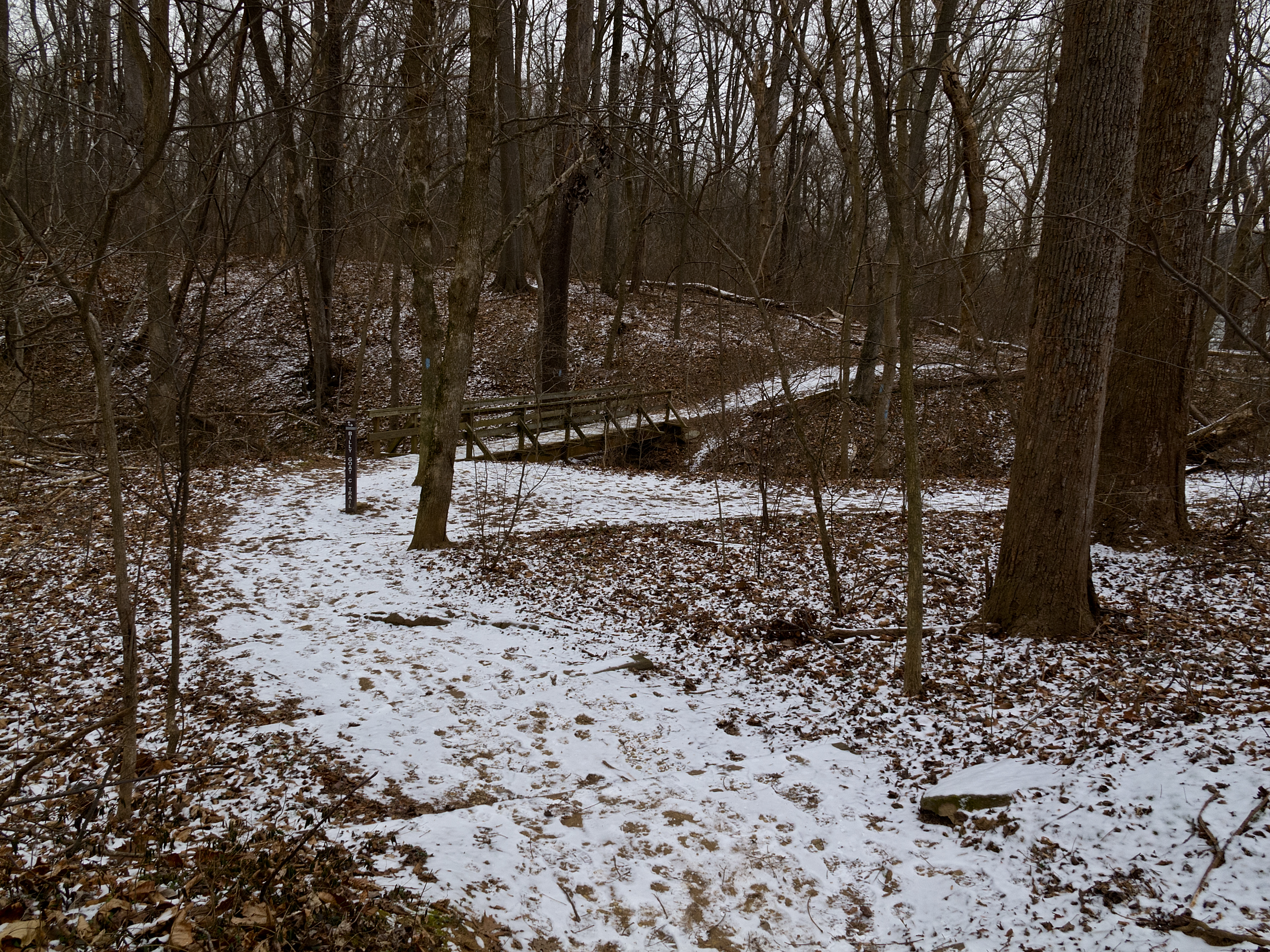
Billy Goat C trail, near the midpoint

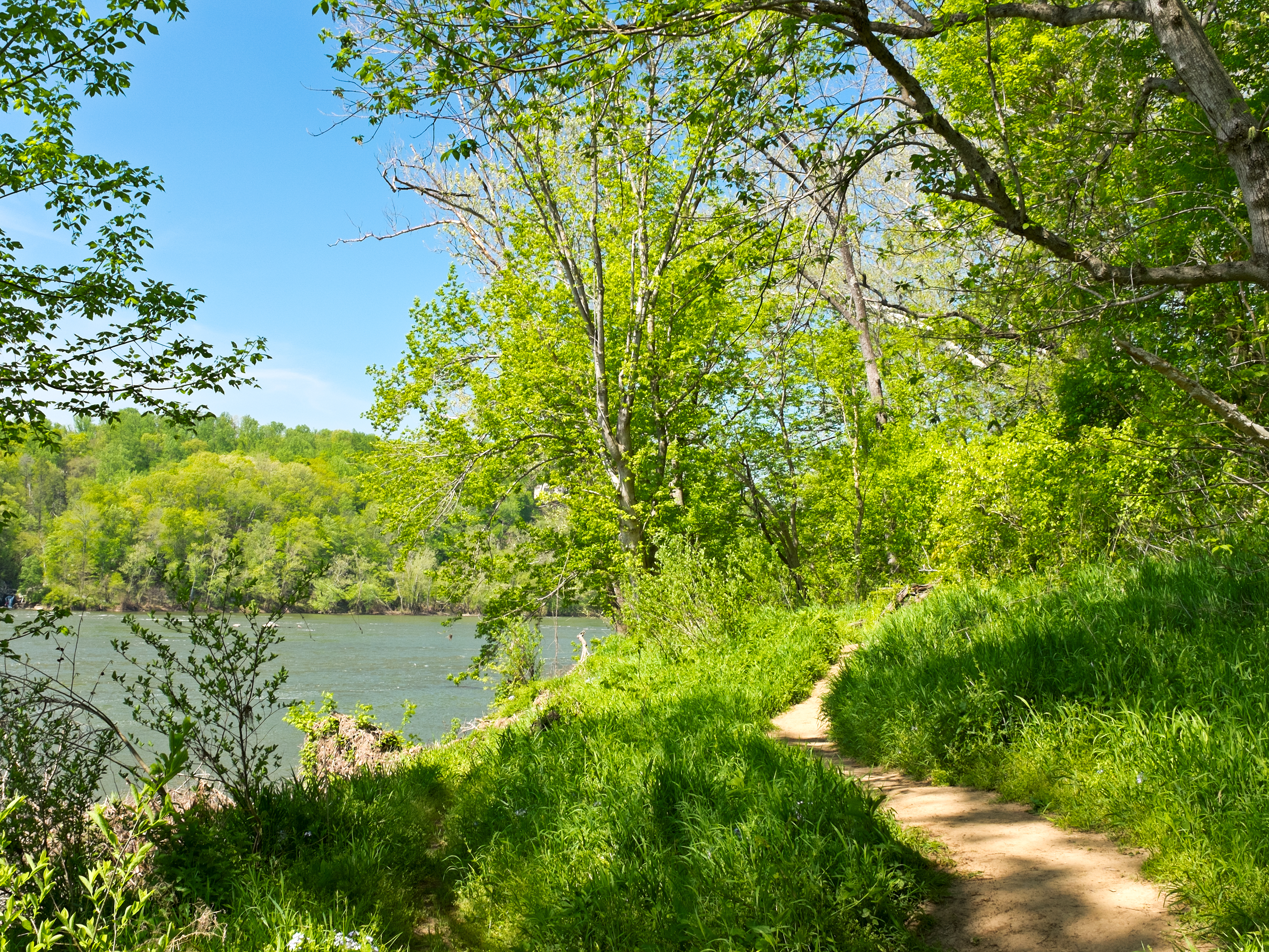
View of Potomac River from C trail

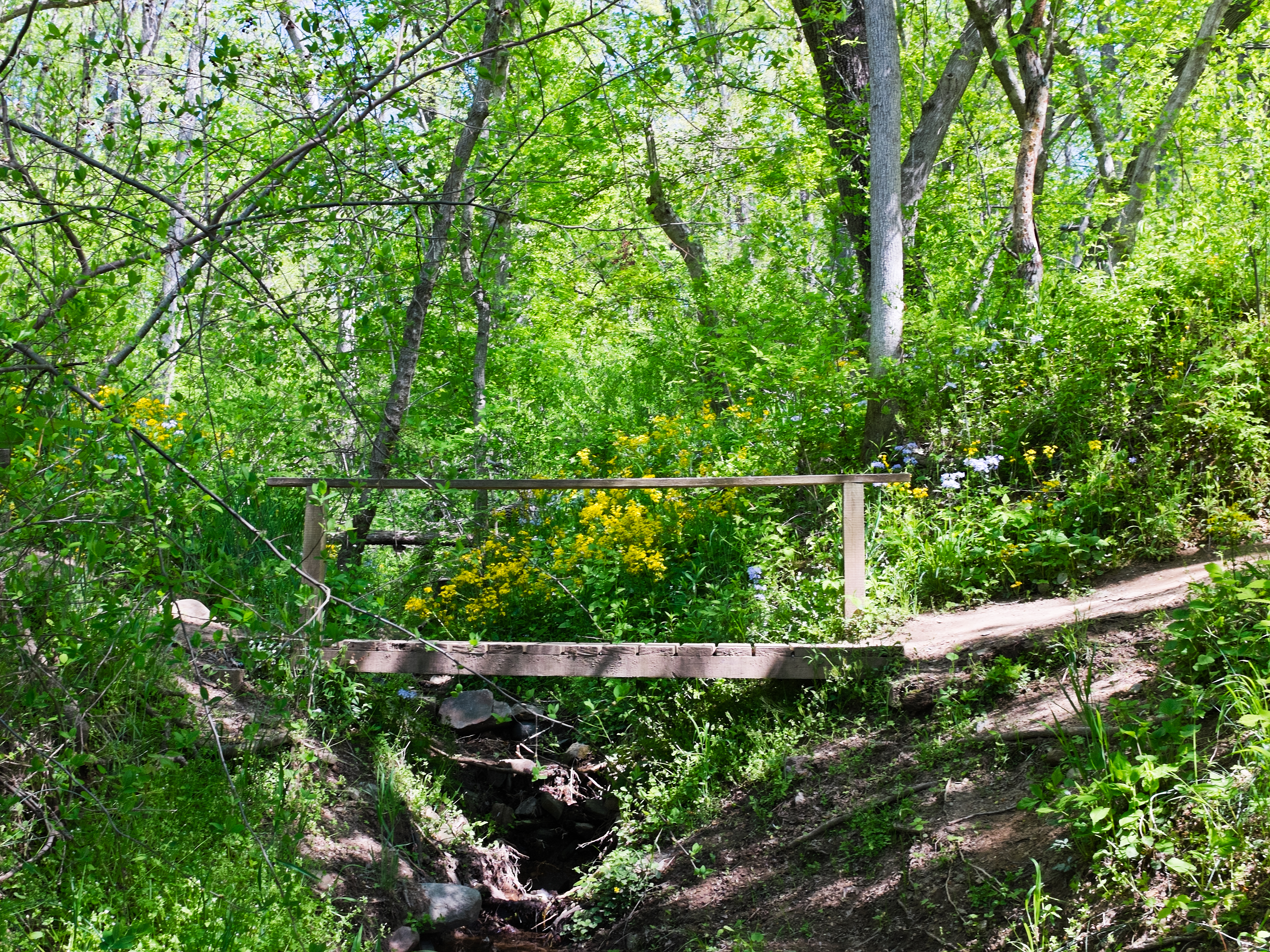
C trail uses a small bridge to cross

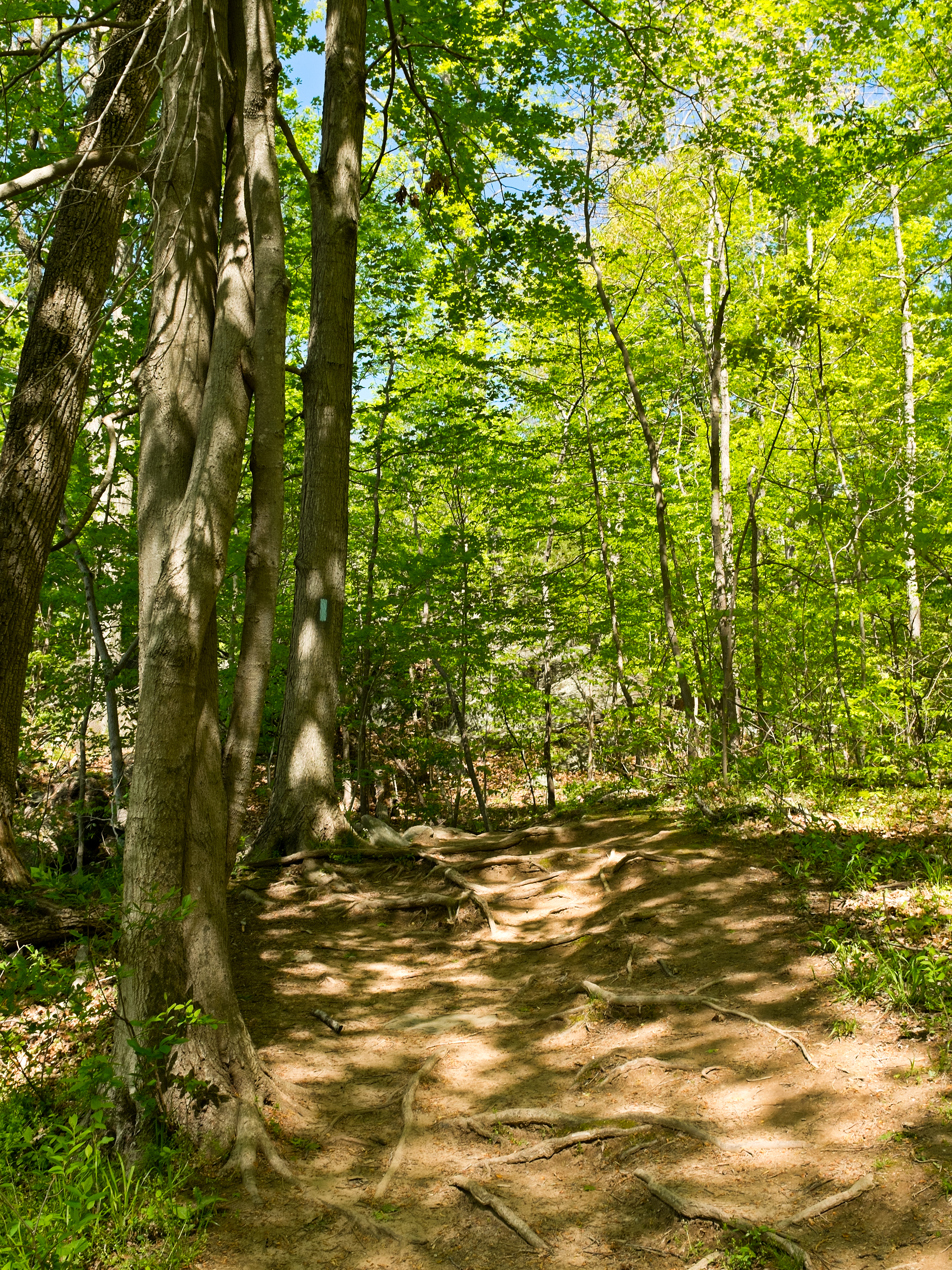
Billy Goat C Trail

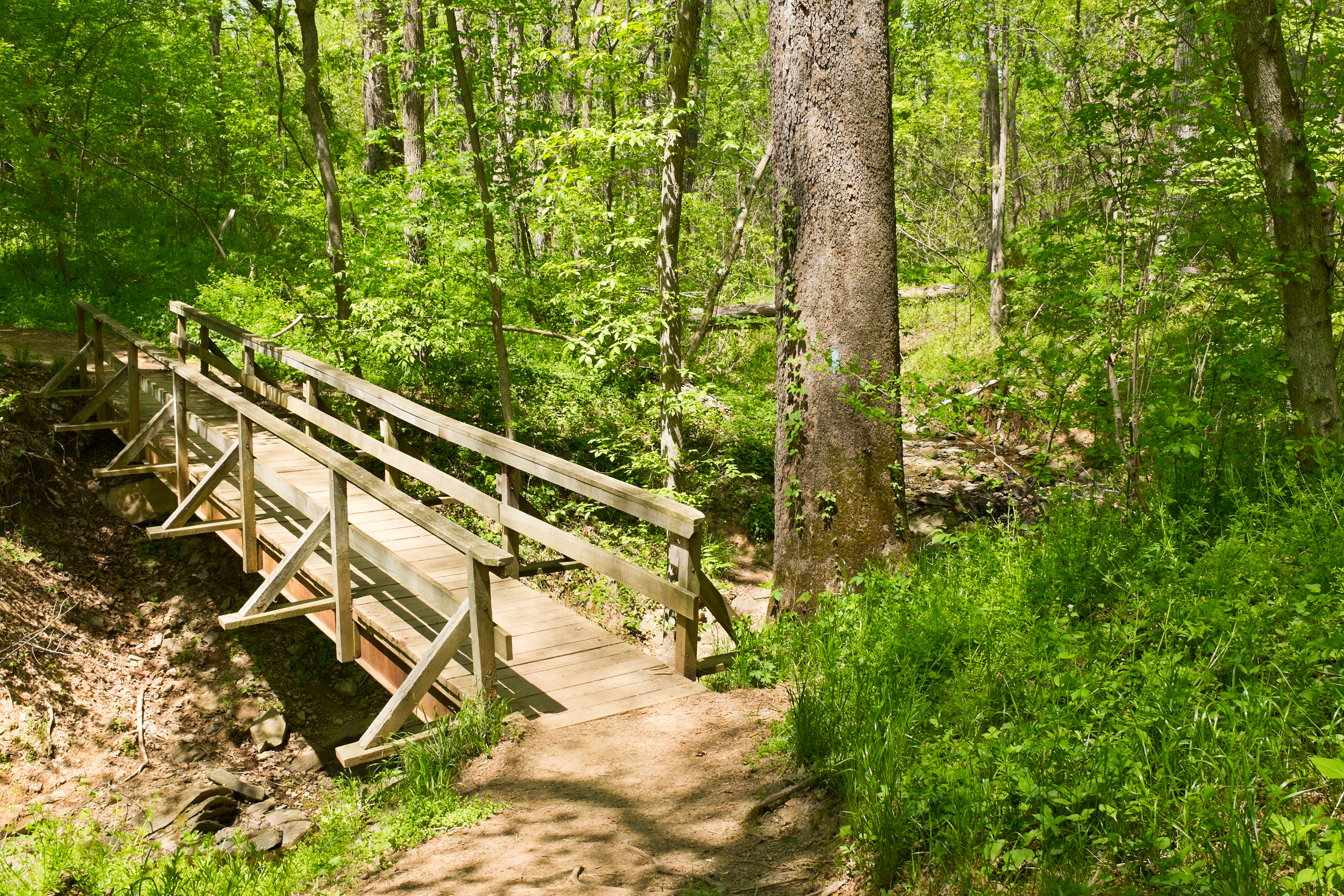
Bridge over stream. This is near the southernmost parking lot.

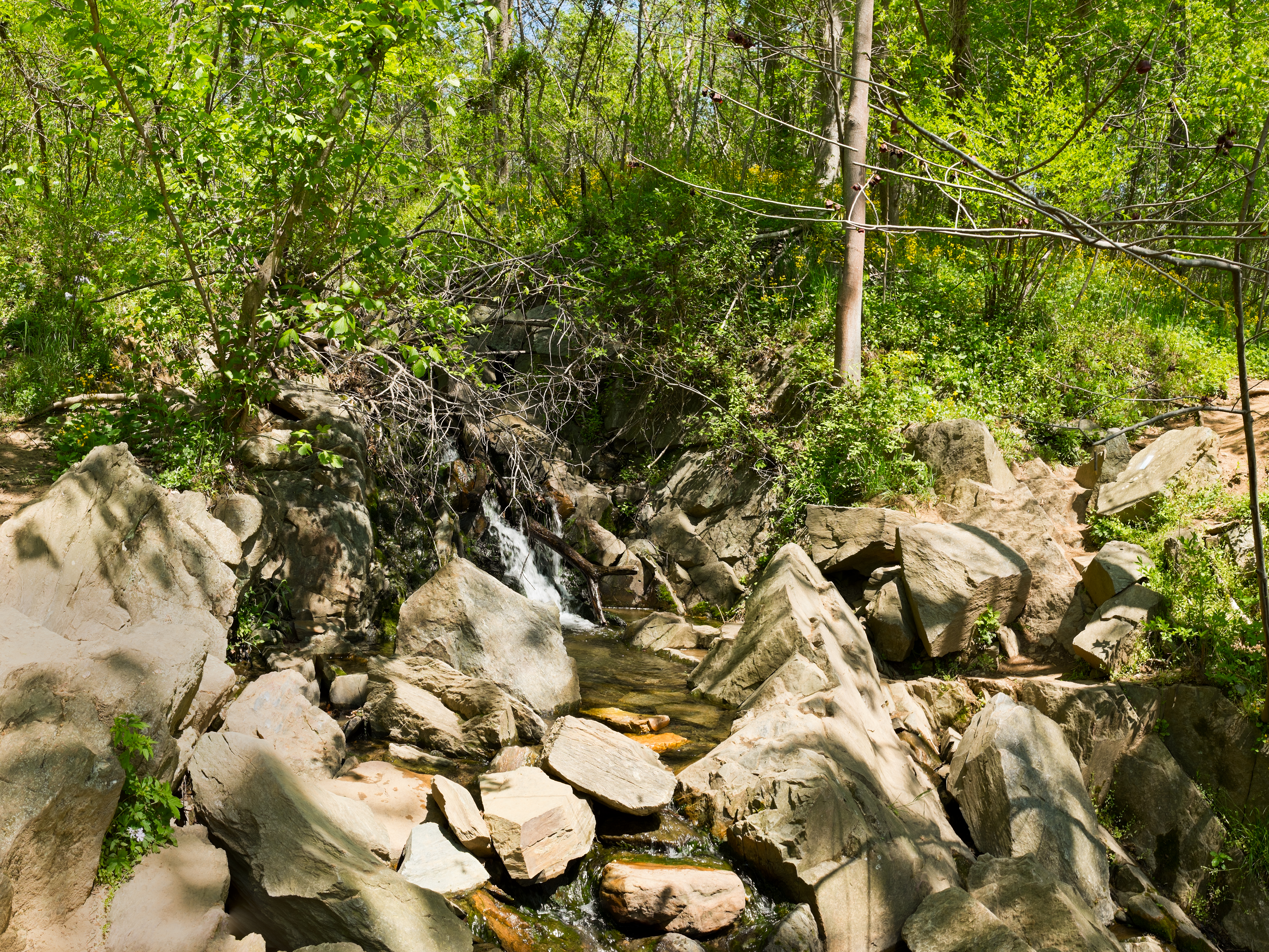
Trail crosses a small stream

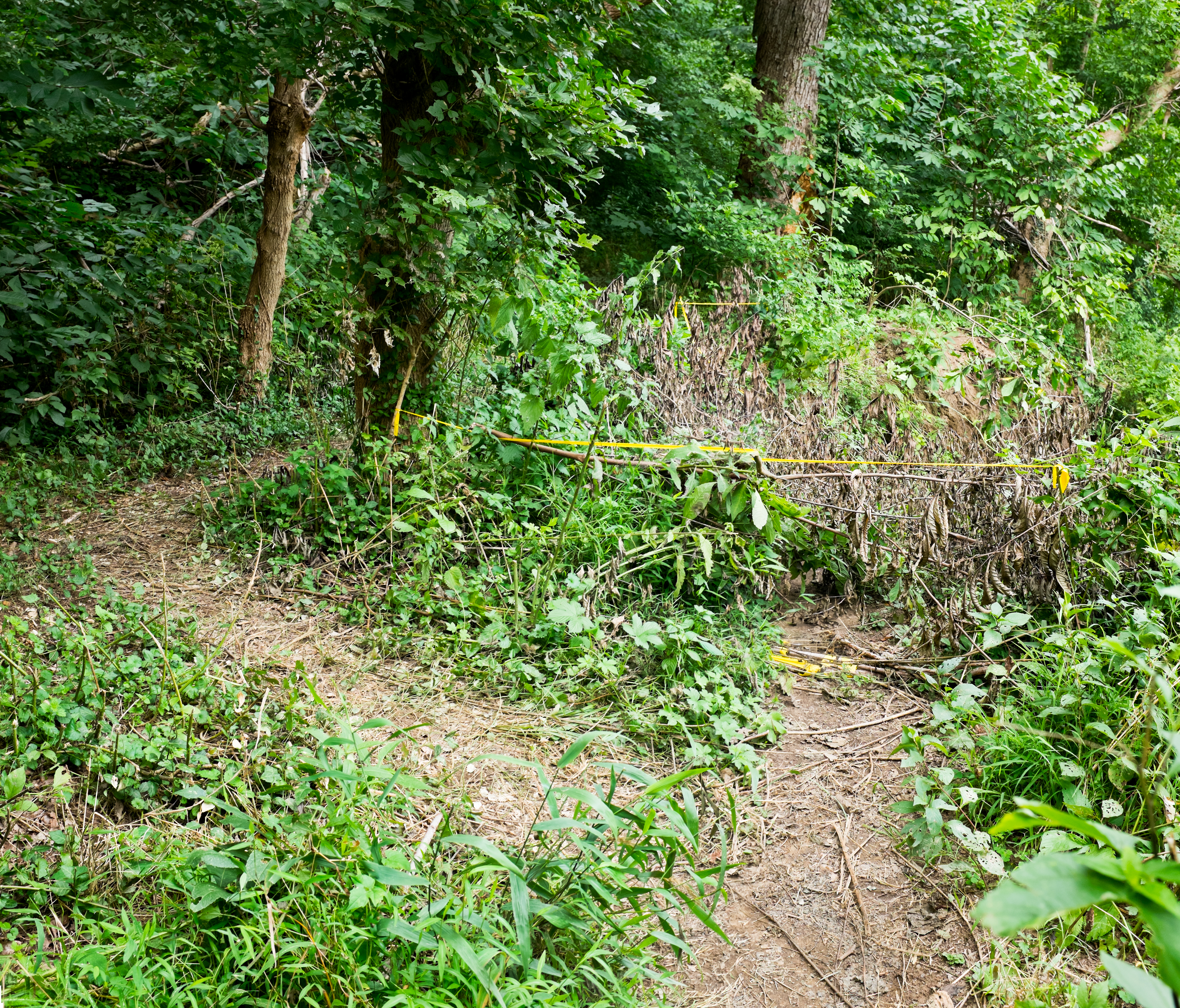
A washout in the trail. Detour goes to the left.

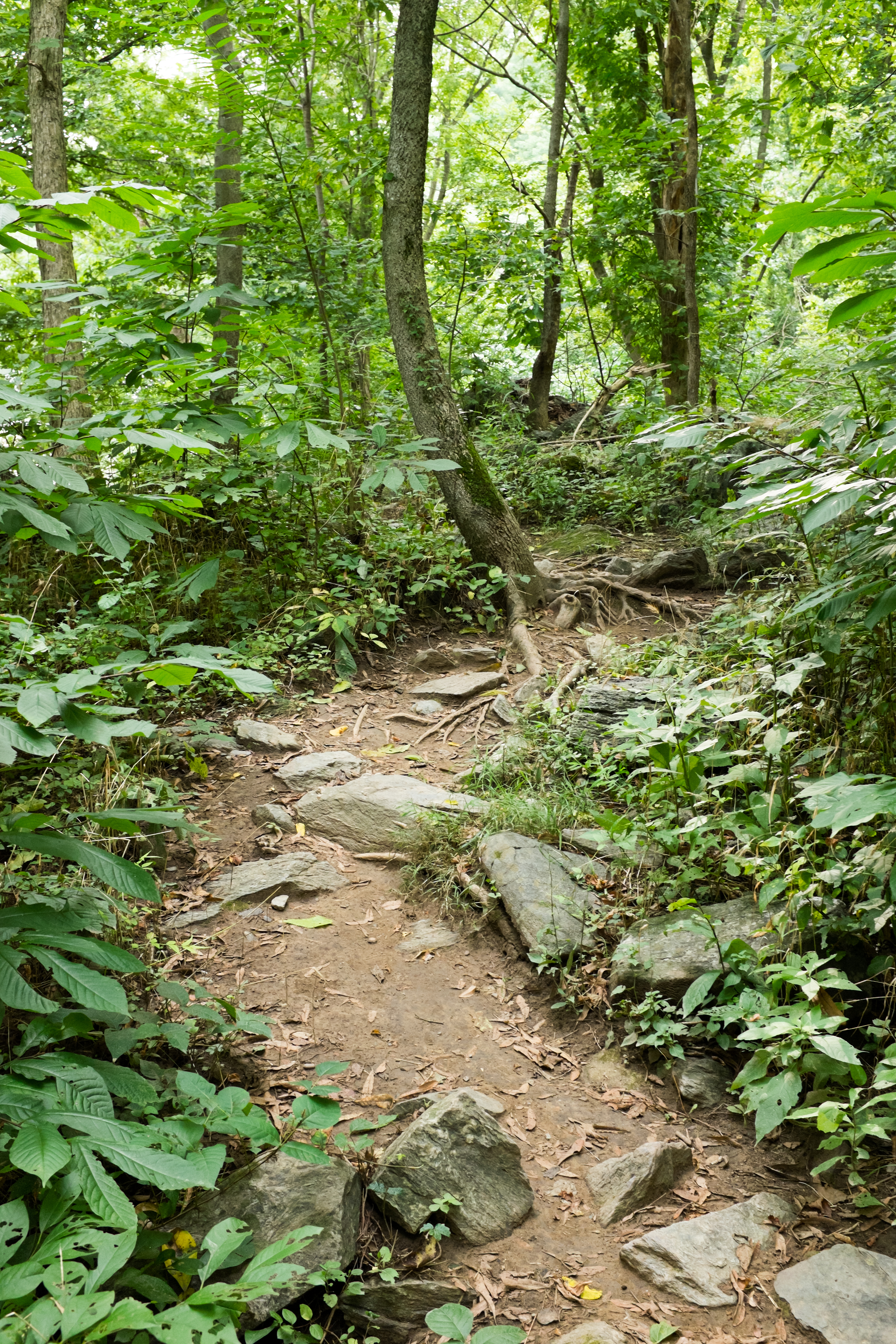
Another look during the summer

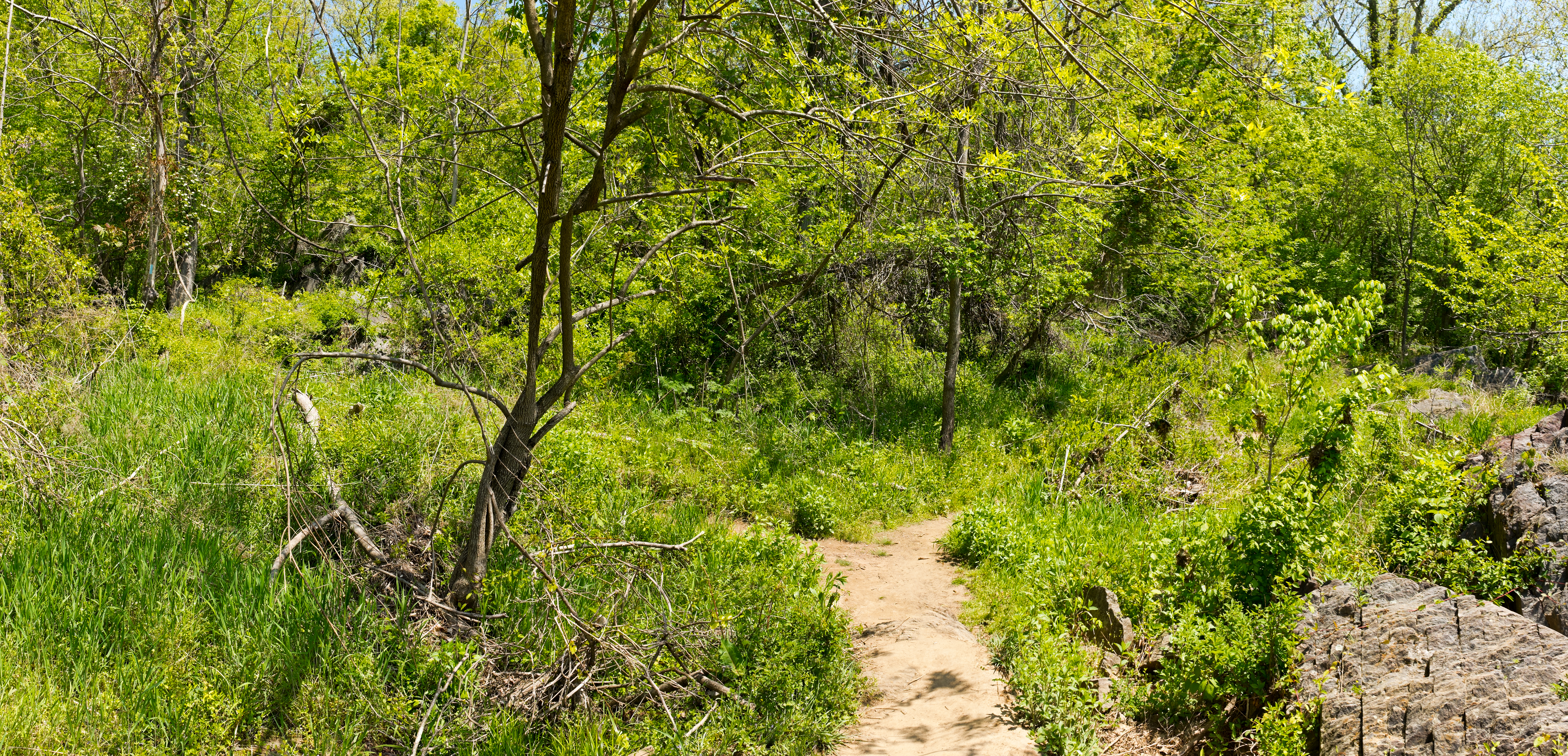
Tricky spot in the C trail. Trail takes the left fork, but because it isn't marked, people often go straight and right off the trail. This is near the downstream end of the trail.

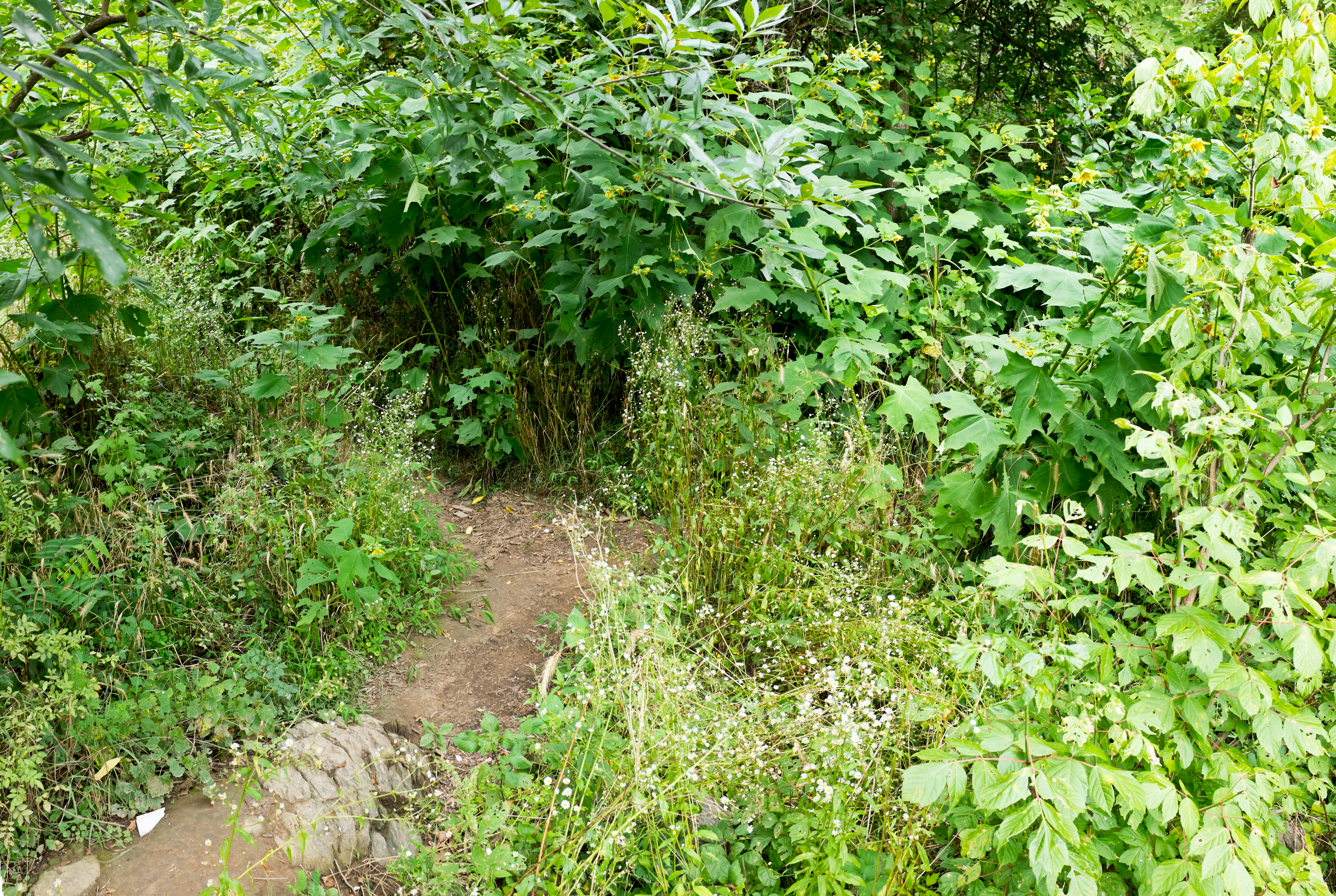
Another view of tricky spot. In summer the vegetation can get pretty high.

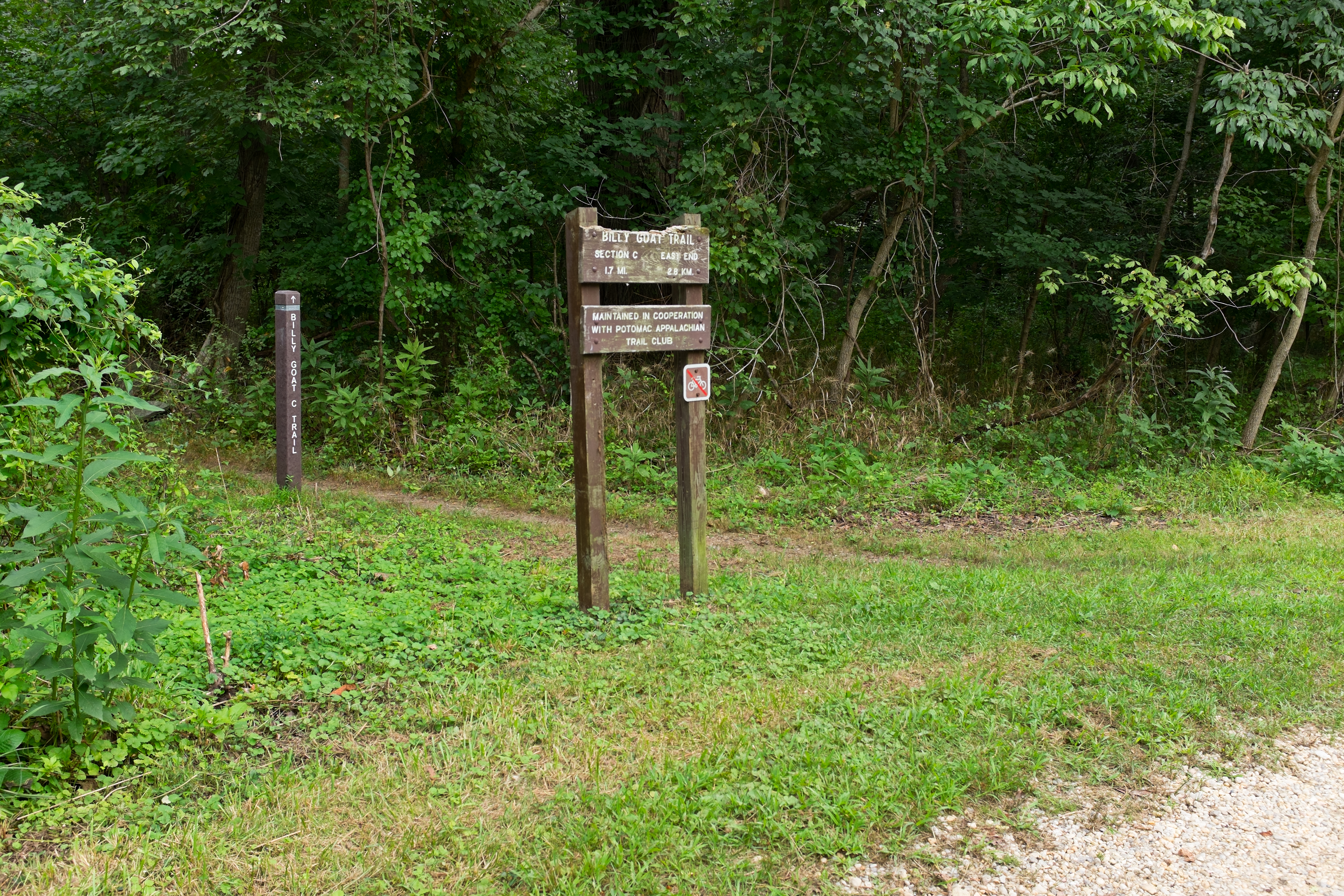
Downstream entrance, near pivot bridge remains on canal
