= List of National Natural Landmarks in New Jersey =

There are 11 National Natural Landmarks in New Jersey. Many of them are related to the glacial geology, especially the Wisconsin Glacier and the Glacial Lake Passaic that it created over a large portion of northern New Jersey.

New Jersey National Natural Landmarks (clickable map)

Name	Image	Date	Location	County	Ownership	Description
Great Falls of Paterson-Garret Mountain		January 1967; expanded April 1967	Paterson 40.916189°N 74.181597°W	Passaic	federal	The Great Falls of the Passaic River and a later expansion including Garret Mountain help demonstrate how jointed basaltic lava flow shaped the geology of the area during the Early Mesozoic era through both extrusion and intrusion
Great Swamp		May 1966	Green Village 40.708333°N 74.466667°W	Morris and Somerset	federal	The remnant of the bottom of Glacial Lake Passaic which was formed by the melting waters of the retreating Wisconsin Glacier at the end of the last ice age. Established in 1960 as a National Wildlife Refuge now covering 7,600 acres (31 km^{2}), it gained landmark status in 1966, and in 1968 became the first formally designated wilderness refuge in the United States.
Manahawkin Bottomland Hardwood Forest	Manahawkin Bottomland Hardwood Forest	January 1976	Manahawkin 39.685591°N 74.221745°W	Ocean	state	A 965 acres (391 ha)[1] wildlife management area known for its mature bottomland hardwood forest which contains examples of American sweetgum, red maple and black gum trees.
Moggy Hollow Natural Area	Moggy Hollow	January 1970	Far Hills 40.67351°N 74.614055°W	Somerset	private	This narrow ravine is where Glacial Lake Passaic, pushed by the Wisconsin Glacier found an outlet, draining to the Raritan river. It remains today a nature preserve and an example of glacial geography.
Palisades of the Hudson	Palisades	June 1983	Fort Lee to Rockleigh40.964507°N 73.908591°W	Bergen	state	Listed in New York, this dramatic geologic ridge runs along the Hudson River
Pigeon Swamp		December 1976	South Brunswick 40.386893°N 74.473829°W	Middlesex	mixed- state, private	An undeveloped state park, it holds a mix of upland and lowland hardwood forests. It was a major nesting site for passenger pigeons before they became extinct.
Riker Hill Fossil Site		June 1971	Roseland 40.815705°N 74.326678°W	Essex	county	Over 1,000 Dinosaur, animal and insect tracks from the Late Triassic and Early Jurassic periods were discovered here in 1968 in a former stone quarry.
Stone Harbor Bird Sanctuary	Stone Harbor Bird Sanctuary	October 1965	Stone Harbor 39.04164°N 74.76879°W	Cape May	municipal	A 21.5-acre (8.7 ha) bird sanctuary and nature preserve which used to host annually returning herons and egrets for nesting season until they started disappearing in the late 1990s.
Sunfish Pond		January 1970	Columbia 41.003043°N 75.073099°W	Warren	state	This glacial pond is a favorite hiking destination in Worthington State Forest, adjacent to the Delaware Water Gap National Recreation Area. Supreme Court Justice William O. Douglas mentioned the pond in his dissenting opinion in the Sierra Club v. Morton case.
Troy Meadows	Troy Meadows	1967	Parsippany-Troy Hills 40.846026°N 74.37928°W	Morris	mixed- state, private	The last unpolluted freshwater marsh of large size in the region.
William L. Hutcheson Memorial Forest	Hutcheson Memorial Forest	December 1976	Somerset 40.500405°N 74.567245°W	Somerset	state	A 500 acres (200 ha) nature preserve which includes a 65 acres (26 ha) virgin old growth forest. It's jointly managed by Rutgers University and the Nature Conservancy.

== See also ==
- List of National Historic Landmarks in New Jersey
