= Go East, Young Man =

1974 memoir by William O. Douglas

- Author: William O. Douglas
- Language: English
- Subject: Pre-judicial life of author
- Genre: Memoir
- Publisher: Random House
- Publication date: March 12, 1974
- Publication place: United States
- Media type: Print (Hardcover)
- Pages: 493
- ISBN: 0-394-48834-2
- OCLC: 737011
- Followed by: The Court Years, 1939 to 1975

Go East, Young Man: The Early Years is a memoir written by United States Supreme Court Justice William O. Douglas. It describes his childhood and early adult life, ending with his appointment to the Court in 1939 at age 40. The title, a play on the famous American expression "Go West, young man", alludes to Douglas's upbringing in the Western United States – being uprooted often, eventually landing in Yakima, Washington – followed by his legal education and professional success in the Eastern United States. It was published by Random House in April 1974 and is 493 pages long.

The work showcases a passion for the natural world and includes vivid descriptions of a young Douglas's time in the Western mountains, including such tales as spending a defenseless night with a friend on an isolated spit of land, convinced that a screeching cougar nearby was about to do away with both of them. While not covering Douglas's tenure on the court, the book does not shy away from expressing his opinions on matters political or otherwise. He also criticizes personal aspects of people by name, including John Foster Dulles. In preparation for the work, Douglas said he had spent time researching records of his family's past and visiting ancestral and familial locations in Nova Scotia and Minnesota.

Upon publication, Christopher Lehmann-Haupt of The New York Times found the book to be "a peculiar kind of autobiography" that, while capturing the nature of its author, is characterized by "a disjointedness between one paragraph and the next that [...] makes the book read as if it was the transcript of an interview with all the questions expunged". Nat Hentoff, writing for The New York Times Book Review, viewed Go East, Young Man much more favorably, saying his writing both here and in his Court opinions features a high level of quality, wit, and persuasiveness, and that "he makes this book so continually arresting that it reads like the kind of novel one wishes would not end." Jim Dinsmore of the Chicago Sun-Times wrote that "Justice William O. Douglas has usually been a maverick and is part of an American tradition, which, in contrast to conformity, extols the virtues of individuality and diversity" and called the memoir "a major testament of our time."

Cover of the paperback edition

Go East, Young Man spent six weeks on The New York Times Best Seller List. It was published in a paperback edition by Dell's Delta Books division later in 1974, at the same length of 493 pages.

The work was framed as the first part of the Autobiography of William O. Douglas, with the second part, The Court Years, 1939 to 1975, being published in 1980 after the author's death. Legal commentator Jeffrey Rosen later wrote that "the norms for judicial memoirs were shattered" by the two volumes and their openness towards expressing strong political viewpoints and criticizing others.

Scholar Bruce Allen Murphy published a heavily researched biography of Douglas in 2003, Wild Bill: The Legend and Life of William O. Douglas. In it, he wrote that Douglas had long falsified much of his early life, including the nature of his childhood illness, the economic suffering of his family, his military service during World War I, and his performance at Columbia Law School. James Ryerson, writing for The New York Times Book Review, accepted Murphy's conclusions and stated that, "In his 1974 autobiography, Go East, Young Man, [Douglas] repeated many of these outright lies, introduced new ones and liberally embellished other key details of his life story." However, another scholar working on a Douglas biography, David J. Danelski, as well as some of Douglas's past associates, said that while Douglas may have exaggerated at times, Murphy's biography had not proven several alleged fabrications regarding his health, education, or marriage.
