= Bruce Allen Murphy =

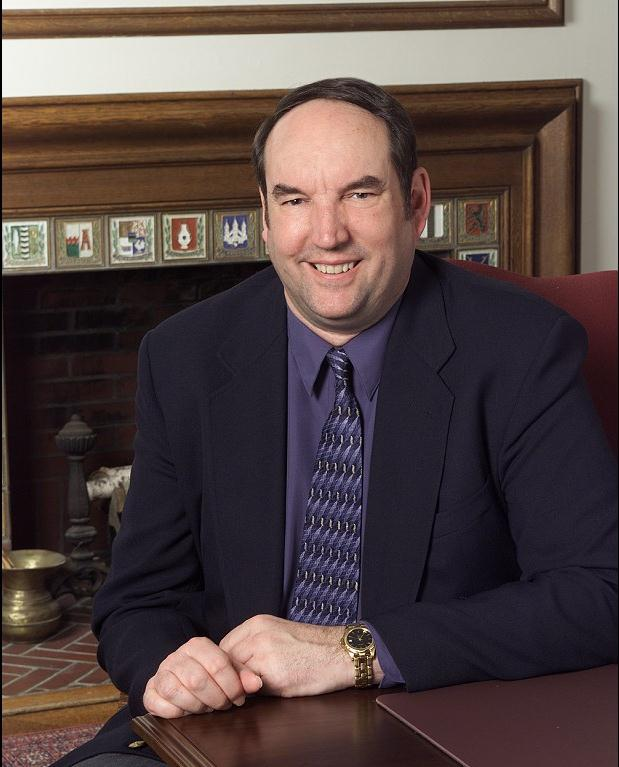
- Born: Abington, Massachusetts, U.S.
- Education: University of Massachusetts Amherst; University of Virginia (PhD)
- Occupations: Judicial biographer and scholar

Bruce Allen Murphy is an American judicial biographer and scholar of constitutional law and politics. He is the Fred Morgan Kirby Professor of Civil Rights at Lafayette College in Easton, Pennsylvania, a position he has held since 1998. Prior to that appointment, he was a professor of political science and a professor of American History and Politics at Pennsylvania State University.

== Early life and education ==
Born and raised in Abington, Massachusetts, Murphy is a 1973 summa cum laude graduate of the University of Massachusetts Amherst where he was elected to Phi Beta Kappa. While there, he was a student of Professors Dean Alfange Jr. and Sheldon Goldman. In 1978, Murphy received his Ph.D. in Government and Foreign Affairs from the University of Virginia where he studied with Professors Henry J. Abraham and Robert J. Harris.

== Book publications ==
Professor Murphy is the author of four judicial biographies, the co-author of a text book, and the editor of a reader. In addition, he is the author of many book chapters, speeches, and articles in professional journals.

Professor Murphy's first book, The Brandeis/Frankfurter Connection: The Secret Political Activities of Two Supreme Court Justices, published in 1982 by Oxford University Press, was the subject of a front-page story in the Sunday New York Times. The book contained details about the financial relationship between Justice Louis D. Brandeis and then-Harvard law professor Felix Frankfurter. While on the Court, Brandeis provided Frankfurter with funds to promote a variety of political reforms. The book sparked a national debate about the ethics of extrajudicial activities by Supreme Court justices.

In 1988, Murphy's second book, Fortas: The Rise and Ruin of a Supreme Court Justice, followed the life and career of Abe Fortas who resigned from the U.S. Supreme Court after his close political ties to President Lyndon B. Johnson and his financial relationship with Louis Wolfson, a potential litigant before the Court, came to light.

A later biography, Wild Bill: The Legend and Life of William O. Douglas, was published in 2003 by Random House, and examines the life and work of the longest-serving Supreme Court justice in U.S. history. This biography describes, "the genius and warts of William O. Douglas, arguably the greatest influence on American jurisprudence." Although Douglas served as a justice for over thirty-six years, his life was, "largely about political intrigue, because, as Murphy documents, Bill Douglas was, at his core, an ambitious politician. He was constantly running for political office, seeking political appointments and playing politics." The biography inspired some debate.

His next book, Scalia: A Court of One, published by Simon & Schuster in June 2014, was about the late United States Supreme Court Justice Antonin Scalia, one of "the most polarizing figures to serve on the nation's highest court." This book argues that Scalia's Originalism theory and judicial conservatism was informed as much by his highly traditional Catholicism, mixed with his political partisanship, as by his reading of the Constitution. "Murphy delivers to us a man driven by three fundamental and nearly operatic qualities: a deep delight in argument, a florid and highly traditional Roman Catholicism and an insatiable need for attention to be paid." Murphy analyzes Scalia's Court opinions and public statements, in the form of speeches, public appearances, interviews, and off-the-Court writings, and scrutinizes the ethical controversies that dogged Scalia in his later years. The book argues that Scalia's influence could go beyond his judicial opinions and dissents to include his ideological progeny in the Federalist Society which he helped to found while a professor at the University of Chicago Law School. This was borne out when originalist Neil Gorsuch succeeded him on the Supreme Court.

In addition to his judicial biographies, Professor Murphy is the co-author (with Professor Larry Berman) of an American Government textbook, Approaching Democracy, which had eight editions with Pearson Education, and a ninth and tenth edition with Routledge Publishing also with Professors Larry Berman, Nadia E. Brown, and Sarah Allen Gershon. He is also the editor of a reader, Portraits of American Politics with Houghton Mifflin Company.

== Teaching career ==
Throughout his academic career, Murphy has taught political science, history, and Constitutional law courses including: American Constitutional Law, Liberty in the United States, The First Amendment, Introduction to U.S. Politics, The American Presidency, and seminars on Judicial Biography and Trials of the Century. He has taught at Lafayette College since 1998.

== Honors and awards ==
Murphy has received numerous awards for his research and teaching, including inter alia:

- Recipient, Albert Nelson Marquis Lifetime Achievement Award, Marquis Who's Who (2017)
- Recipient, Mary Louise Van Artsdalen Award for Outstanding Scholarly Achievement, Lafayette College (2015)
- Recipient, Marquis Award for Distinguished Teaching, Lafayette College (2011)
- Recipient, Aaron O. Hoff Award for Organization Adviser of the Year (2000)
- Fellow, Institute for the Arts and Humanistic Studies, The Pennsylvania State University (1989)
- Honoree, Named Among “125 Alumni to Watch,” University of Massachusetts at Amherst (1988)
- Recipient, Christian R. and Mary F. Lindback Award for Distinguished Undergraduate Teaching (1987)
- Nominee, Charles A. Dana Award for Pioneering Achievements in Higher Education (1987)
- Recipient, Citation Award, Council for Advancement and Support of Education (1984–1987)
- Finalist, Professor of the Year, Council for Advancement and Support of Education (1984–1987)
- Recipient, Certificate of Merit from the American Bar Association for The Brandeis/Frankfurter Connection(1981).
- Honoree, Alumni Association Faculty Adviser of the Year, College of the Liberal Arts, The Pennsylvania State University (1981)
- Featured Listee, Who's Who in America (2001–2014, 2016)
- Featured Listee, Who's Who in the World (2000, 2002–2004, 2008–2014, 2016)
- Featured Listee, Who's Who in American Law (2015)
- Featured Listee, Who's Who in the East (2009–2015)
- Featured Listee, Who's Who in American Education (2005, 2007)
