= Maine Township, Minnesota =

- Township
- Location of Maine Township, within Otter Tail County, Minnesota

- Location within the state of Minnesota Maine Township, Minnesota (the United States)
- Coordinates: 46°24′5″N 95°51′11″W
- Country: United States
- State: Minnesota
- County: Otter Tail

Area
  - Total: 35.9 sq mi (93.1 km^{2})
  - Land: 30.1 sq mi (78.0 km^{2})
  - Water: 5.8 sq mi (15.1 km^{2})
- Elevation: 1,332 ft (406 m)

Population (2020)
  - Total: 665
  - Density: 22.1/sq mi (8.53/km^{2})
- Time zone: UTC-6 (Central (CST))
  - Summer (DST): UTC-5 (CDT)
- ZIP code: 56586
- Area code: 218
- FIPS code: 27-39500
- GNIS feature ID: 0664878

Maine Township is a township in Otter Tail County, Minnesota, United States. The population was 665 at the 2020 census.

== History ==
Maine Township was organized in 1871, and named after the state of Maine, the native home of an early settler.

Supreme Court Justice William O. Douglas was born in Maine Township in 1898.

== Geography ==
According to the United States Census Bureau, the township has a total area of 36.0 square miles (93.1 km^{2}), of which 30.1 square miles (78.0 km^{2}) is land and 5.8 square miles (15.1 km^{2}) (16.24%) is water.

== Demographics ==
As of the census of 2000, there were 686 people, 285 households, and 210 families residing in the township. The population density was 22.8 inhabitants per square mile (8.8/km^{2}). There were 556 housing units at an average density of 18.5 per square mile (7.1/km^{2}). The racial makeup of the township was 97.52% White, 0.29% African American, 0.44% Native American, 1.60% Asian, and 0.15% from two or more races. Hispanic or Latino of any race were 0.87% of the population.

There were 285 households, out of which 26.0% had children under the age of 18 living with them, 66.7% were married couples living together, 3.9% had a female householder with no husband present, and 26.3% were non-families. 22.1% of all households were made up of individuals, and 10.9% had someone living alone who was 65 years of age or older. The average household size was 2.41 and the average family size was 2.81.

In the township the population was spread out, with 22.3% under the age of 18, 5.5% from 18 to 24, 20.4% from 25 to 44, 32.5% from 45 to 64, and 19.2% who were 65 years of age or older. The median age was 46 years. For every 100 females, there were 109.8 males. For every 100 females age 18 and over, there were 105.8 males.

The median income for a household in the township was $36,875, and the median income for a family was $47,321. Males had a median income of $32,188 versus $19,375 for females. The per capita income for the township was $18,744. About 5.1% of families and 7.7% of the population were below the poverty line, including 3.6% of those under age 18 and 12.1% of those age 65 or over.
