= Sunfish Pond =

Lake along the Appalachian Trail in New Jersey

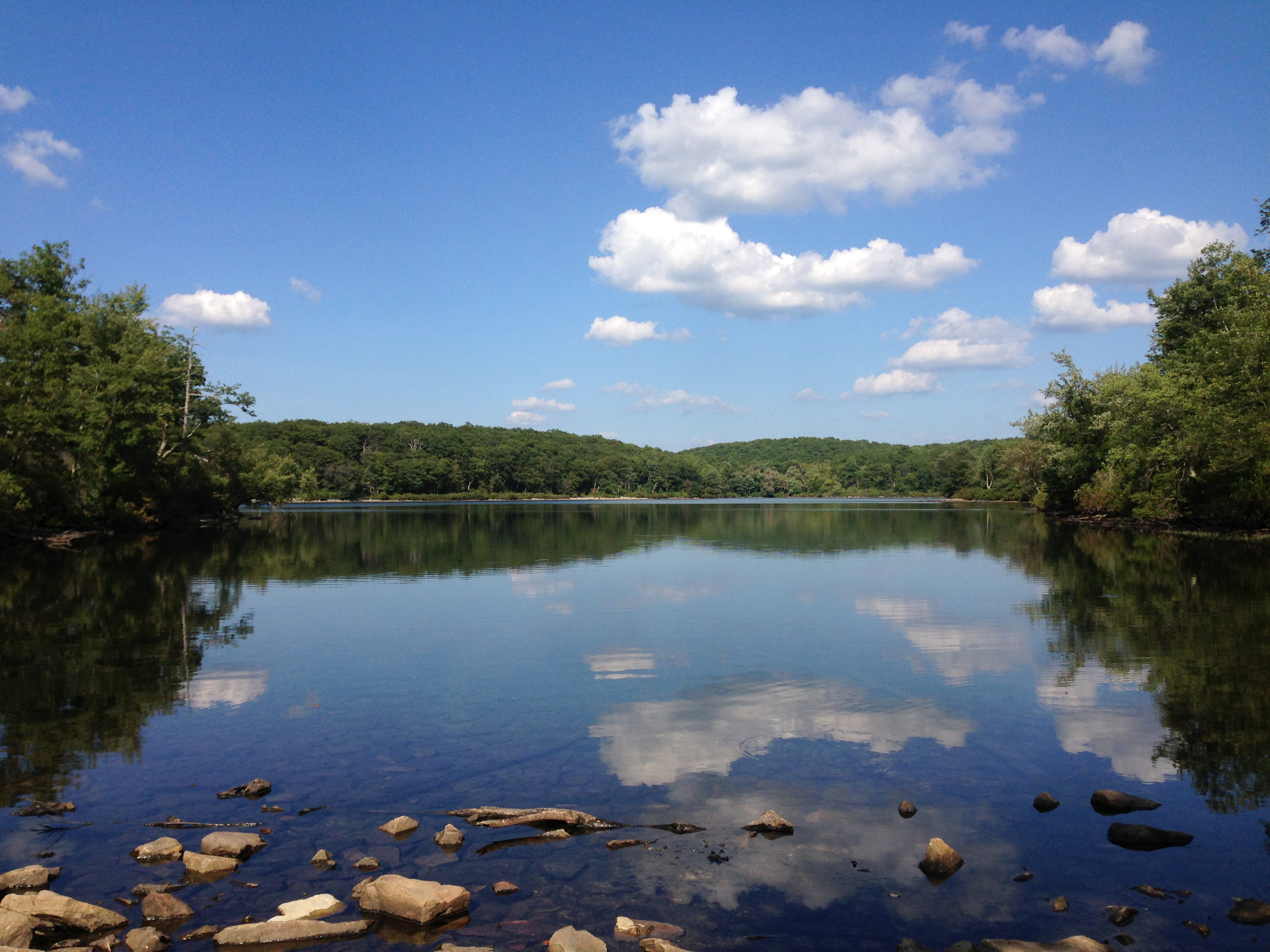

- Location within Warren County, New Jersey Location within New Jersey Location within the United States
- Location: Worthington State Forest, Hardwick Township, Warren County, New Jersey
- Coordinates: 41°0′10″N 75°4′23″W
- Type: Glacial
- Basin countries: United States
- Surface area: 44 acres (18 ha)
- Surface elevation: 1,379 ft (420 m)

U.S. National Natural Landmark
- Designated: January 1970

Sunfish Pond is a 44-acre (18 ha) glacial lake surrounded by a 258-acre (104 ha) hardwood forest located on the Kittatinny Ridge within Worthington State Forest, adjacent to the Delaware Water Gap National Recreation Area in Warren County, New Jersey. The Appalachian Trail runs alongside the western and northern edges of the lake. It was created by the Wisconsin Glacier during the last ice age. The lake was declared a National Natural Landmark in January 1970.

== History ==
The land was purchased by Charles C. Worthington who used the forest as a deer hunting preserve; the lake supplied water to his mansion.

In 1965, there was a plan to create a reservoir which would have covered the lake. Casey Kays, a local custodian, led 655 people on a hike to protest the plan. Further hikes and letter campaigns caused the power companies that owned the land to donate it to the state in 1966. Supreme Court Justice William O. Douglas mentioned the lake in his dissenting opinion in the Sierra Club v. Morton case. On a hike in 1967, Douglas accompanied more than a thousand people to Sunfish Pond. He said: "It's a vital element in the need to save some of our wilderness from the encroachment of civilization."

== Flora and fauna ==
The lake is surrounded by stands of mountain laurel, sheep laurel, and Cunila origanoides. Nearby are fields of Symphoricarpos orbiculatus. The lake itself also has Drosera rotundifolia growing near the edge.

== Visiting ==
Sunfish pond is a popular hiking destination. Several trails reach the lake, including the Appalachian Trail which runs alongside the western and northern edges of the lake. It is the southernmost glacial tarn along that trail.

The shortest distance to the lake is 1.2 miles from the Douglas trailhead on Old Mine Road via the Garvey Springs Trail. The Douglas Trail, named after Justice Douglas, can be taken to the Appalachian Trail and then Sunfish Pond. The trails are steep and rocky in places. There is no swimming in the lake. There is a Leave No Trace campground a quarter mile away, but proper food precautions must be followed since black bears are active in the area.

There is a collection of ad hoc primitive rock artworks (cairns) along the northwestern shore.

== Gallery ==
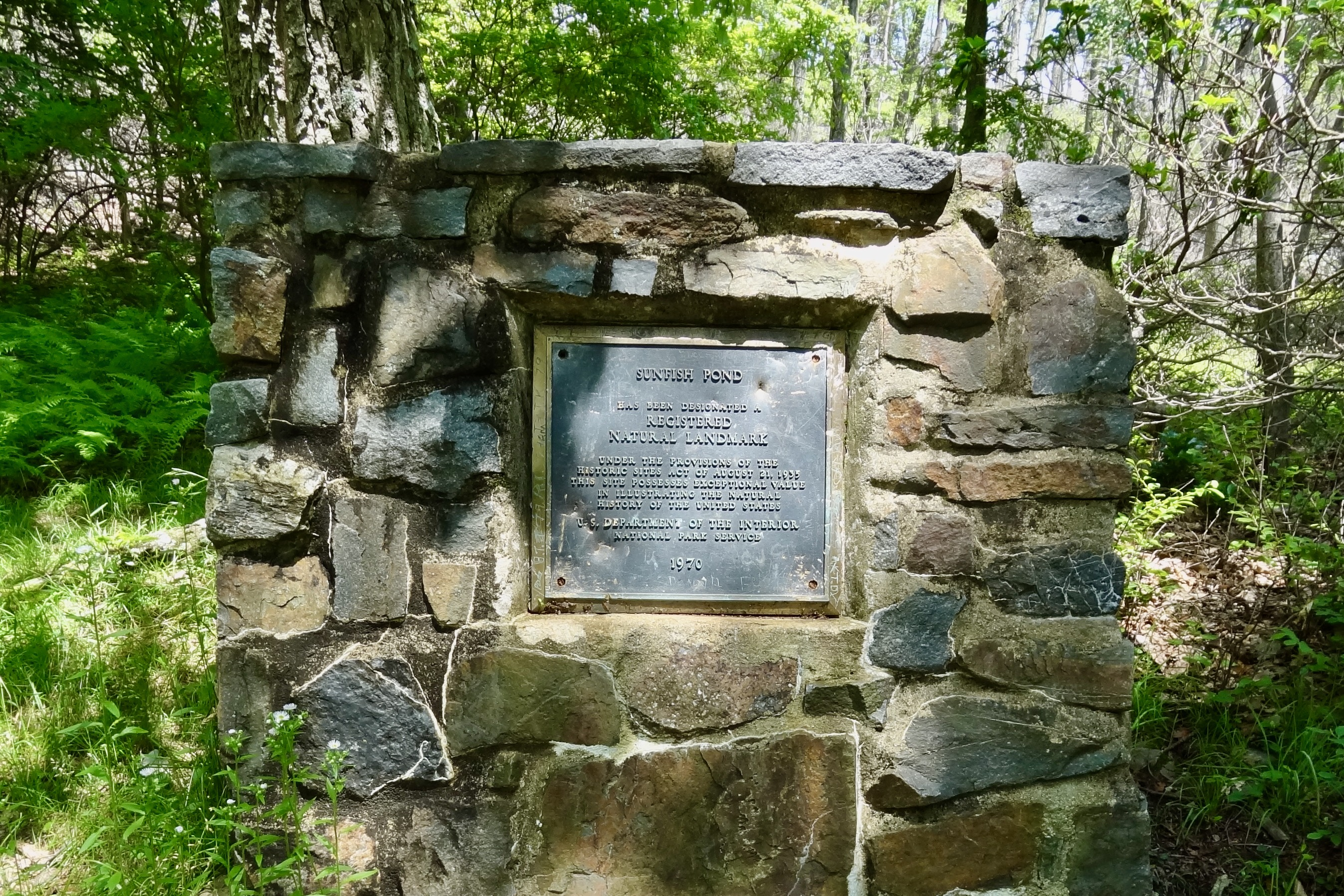
National Natural Landmark plaque

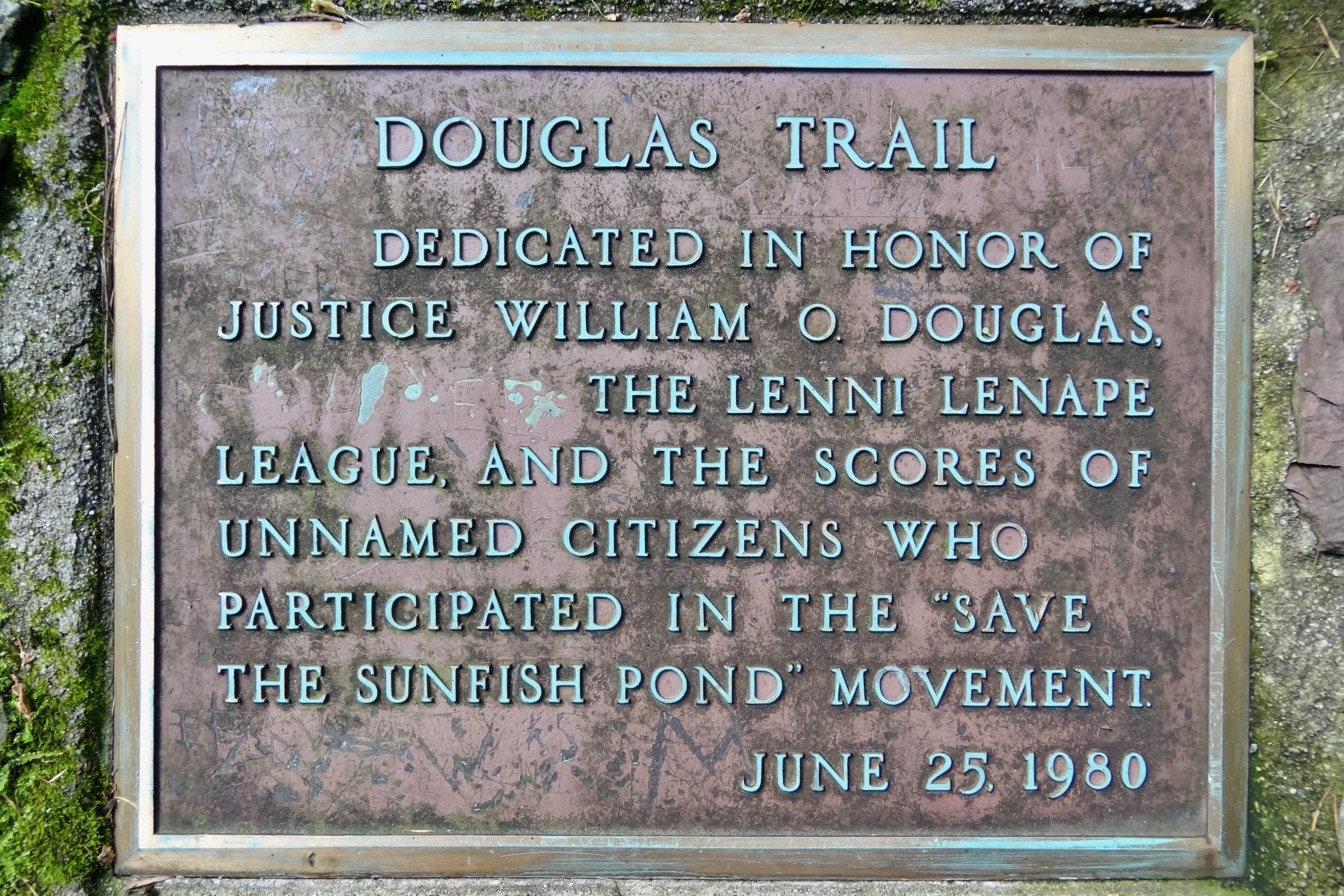
Douglas Trail plaque

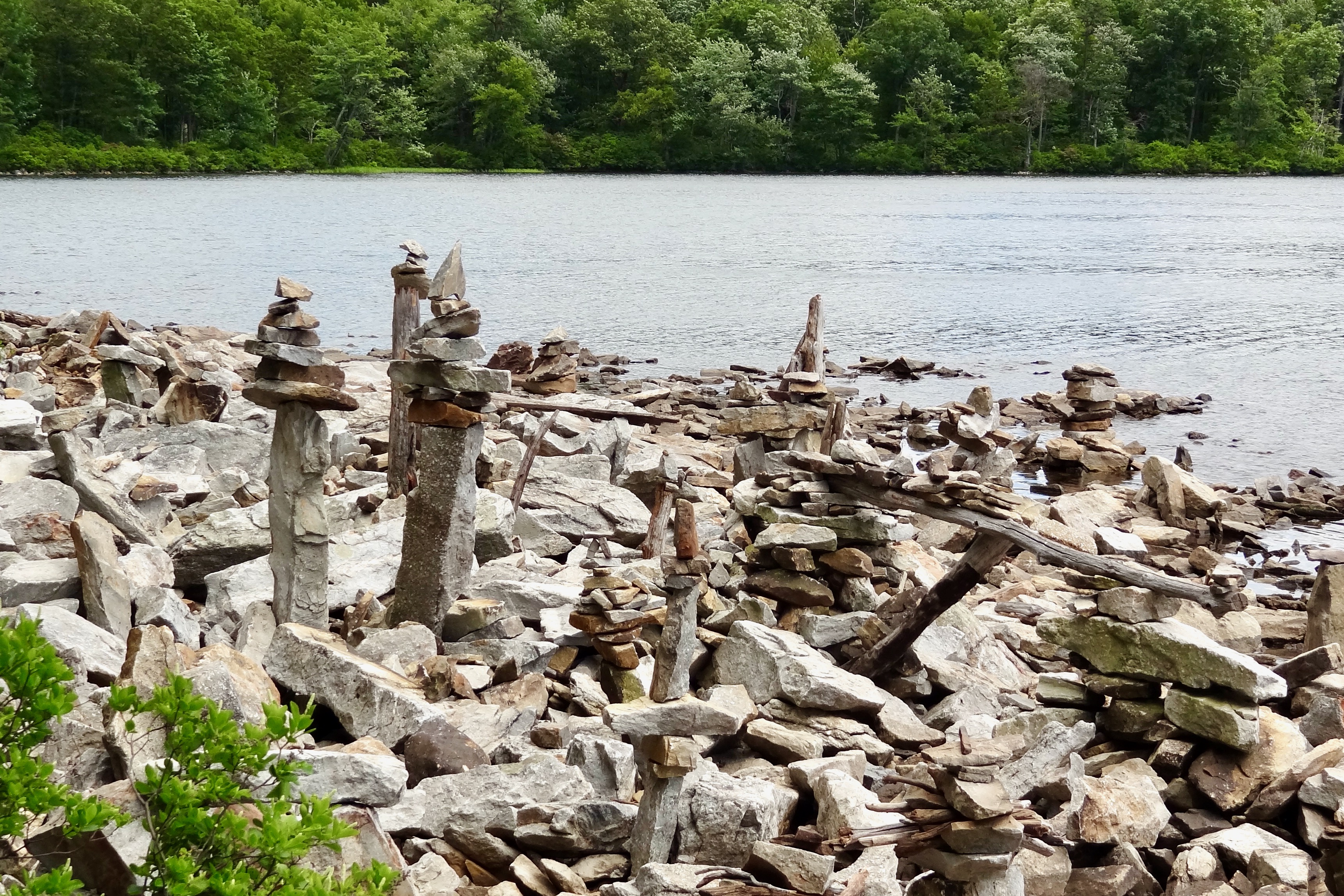
Cairn artwork along the shore

== See also ==
- List of National Natural Landmarks in New Jersey
- Tocks Island Dam controversy
