= Sheldon Goldman =

American political science professor

Sheldon Goldman (born September 18, 1939) is a Distinguished Professor emeritus of political science at the University of Massachusetts Amherst and the author of Picking Federal Judges (1997, 1999) and The Federal Courts as a Political System, (3rd ed., 1985). He also has written other works and numerous articles in professional journals including American Political Science Review, Journal of Politics, and Judicature and chapters in books. He is chair of the Law and Courts Section of the American Political Science Association, 2000–2001; and a member of the Editorial Board, Law & Politics Book Review, 1994–1997; American Political Science Review, 1981–1985, and American Journal of Political Science, 1979–1982.

Goldman received a Lifetime Achievement Award from the Law and Courts Section of the American Political Science Association in 2006.

He graduated from New York University (BA) and Harvard University (MA, PhD).
