= Nadia E. Brown =

American political scientist

- Education: Howard University; Rutgers University
- Known for: Black women's politics, intersectionality, legislative studies, state & local politics, political behavior
- Awards: W.E.B. DuBois Distinguished Book Award; APSA Member of the Month; Purdue University Scholar
- Scientific career
- Fields: Political science; African American studies; women's, gender, and sexuality studies
- Workplaces: Georgetown University: St. Louis University; Purdue University
- Doctoral advisor: Jane Junn & Susan Carroll

Nadia Elizabeth Brown is an American political scientist. She is a University Scholar and professor of Political Science and African American Studies at Purdue University, where she is also affiliated with the Department of Women's, Gender, and Sexuality Studies. In 2020 she was appointed director of the Women's and Gender Studies Program at Georgetown University, with a term starting in August 2021. Brown is a scholar of American politics whose work focuses on identity politics, legislative studies, and Black women's studies, using the theory of intersectionality to study topics across multiple disciplines.

== Education and early career ==
Brown studied political science at Howard University, obtaining a BA in 2004. She chose to study political science because of an interest in how power is distributed in society, and particularly how Black women engage in political activity. In 2010 she completed her PhD in political science at Rutgers University, specializing in Women and Politics and American Politics. She also received a Graduate Certificate in Women's and Gender Studies. From 2010 to 2013, she was a professor of political science and African American studies, and affiliated with women's studies, at St. Louis University.

== Career ==
In 2014, Brown published the book Sisters in the Statehouse: Black Women and Legislative Decision Making, which studies how the policy preferences and legislative behavior of African American women legislators are influenced by experiences with racism and sexism during their lives, given the context that in 2013, only 239 of the 7,776 female legislators in the United States were African American women. The book was reviewed positively not just for its substantive findings, but also for its analytical approach, with Muireann O'Dwyer writing that it "delivered an answer to the enduring question of how exactly intersectionality can be brought to bear on the empirical questions of social science". Sisters in the Statehouse won the 2015 W.E.B. DuBois Distinguished Book Award, as well as awards from Purdue University and the Association for the Study of Black Women and Politics.

In 2016, Brown was appointed a University Scholar at Purdue University, an honor which is intended "to recognize outstanding mid-career faculty who are on an accelerated path for academic distinction". Brown was chosen as the American Political Science Association's Member of the Month for April 2019.

Brown is the lead editor of the journal Politics, Groups, and Identities, which she has noted may make her the first Black woman to be the sole lead editor of a political science journal. She has also been a member of the editorial board of the political science expert database Women Also Know Stuff.

Brown is an advocate for political scientists to communicate about their discipline with the media. She has published in The Washington Post, the Huffington Post, and Ozy, and been cited in outlets like The New York Times and The Washingtonian.

== Selected works ==
- Brown, Nadia E. and Danielle Casarez Lemi. 2021. Sister Style: The Politics of Appearance for Black Women Political Elites. Oxford University Press.
- Brown, Nadia E. 2014. Sisters in the Statehouse: Black Women and Legislative Decision Making. Oxford University Press.

== Selected awards ==
- W.E.B. DuBois Distinguished Book Award (2015)
- Purdue University Scholar (2016)
- American Political Science Association Member of the Month (2019)
