= Manahawkin Wildlife Management Area =

Protected area in New Jersey, United States

- Manahawkin Bottomland Hardwood Forest
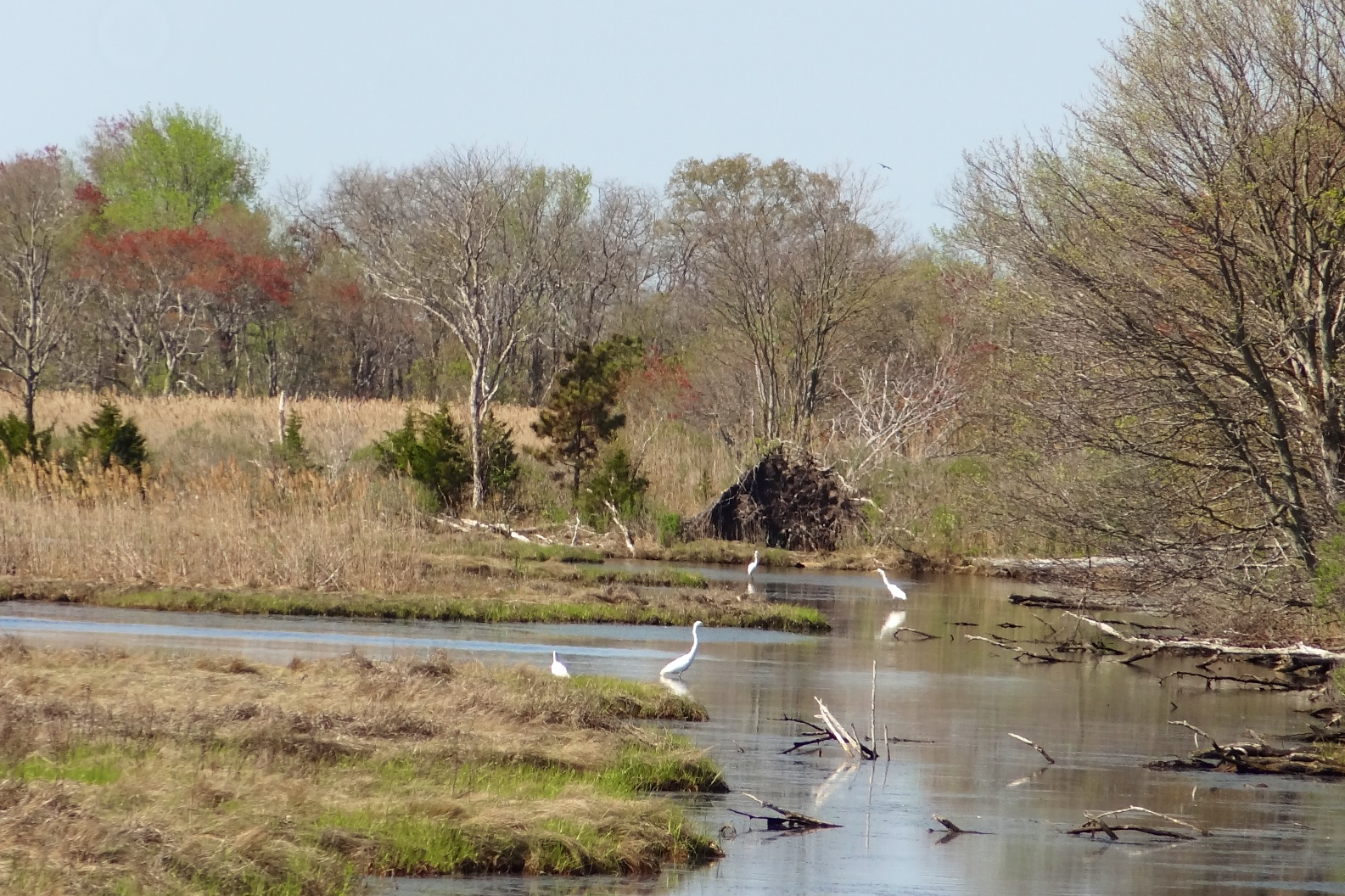

- Location within Ocean County, New Jersey
- Location: Stafford Township, Ocean County, New Jersey
- Nearest city: Manahawkin
- Coordinates: 39°41′08″N 74°13′18″W
- Area: 1,642 acres (664 ha)
- Governing body: New Jersey Division of Fish and Wildlife

U.S. National Natural Landmark
- Designated: 1976

Manahawkin Wildlife Management Area (Manahawkin Bottomland Hardwood Forest) is a 1,642-acre (664 ha) wildlife management area near Manahawkin, Stafford Township, Ocean County, New Jersey. It was designated a National Natural Landmark in January 1976. It is known for its mature bottomland hardwood forest which contains examples of American sweetgum, red maple and black gum trees.
