= William O. Douglas =

American jurist (1898–1980)

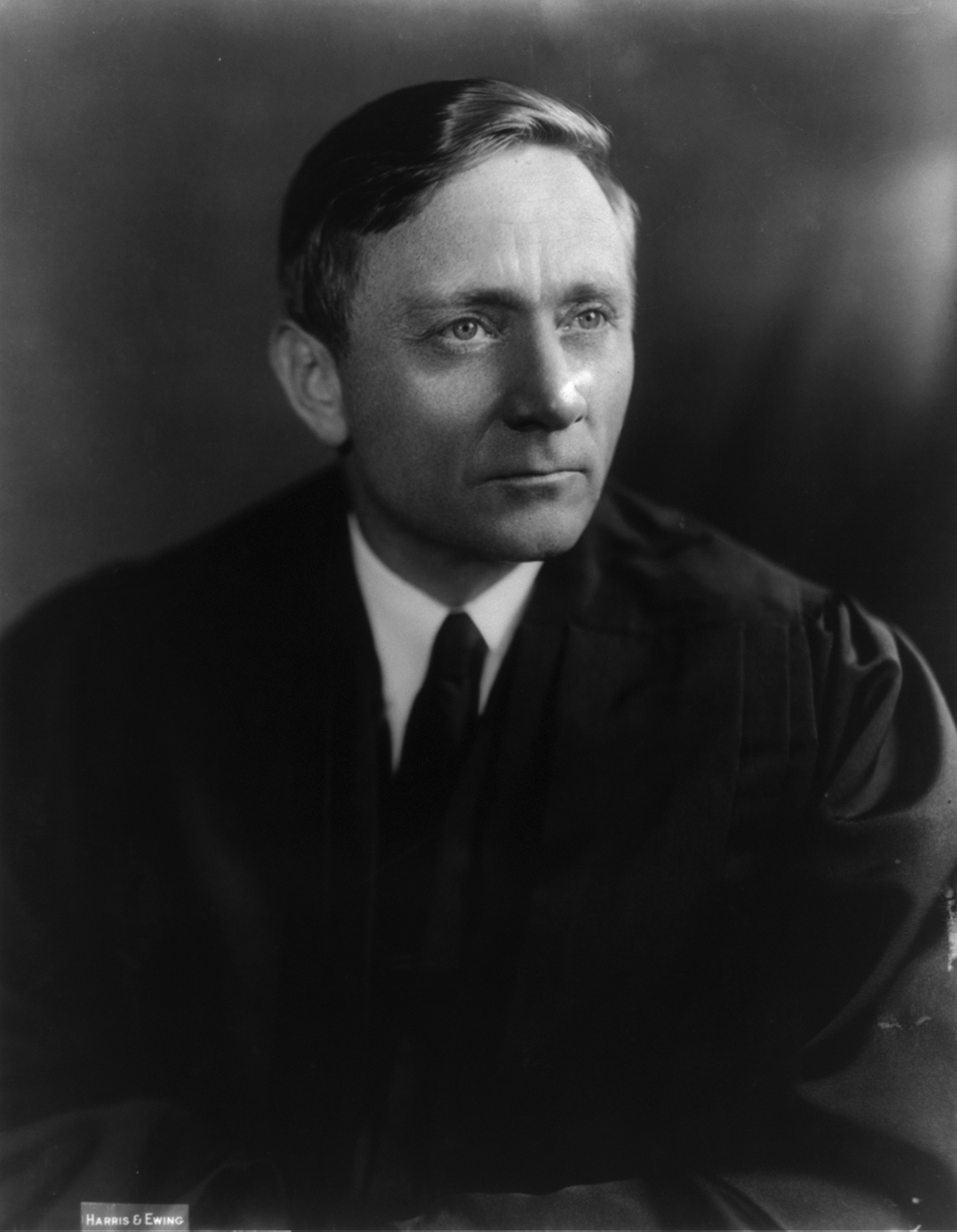
- Associate Justice William O Douglas by Harris & Ewing, 1930s

Associate Justice of the Supreme Court of the United States
- In office April 17, 1939 – November 12, 1975
- Nominated by: Franklin D. Roosevelt
- Preceded by: Louis Brandeis
- Succeeded by: John Paul Stevens

3rd Chairman of the Securities and Exchange Commission
- In office August 17, 1937 – April 15, 1939
- President: Franklin D. Roosevelt
- Preceded by: James M. Landis
- Succeeded by: Jerome Frank

Member of the Securities and Exchange Commission
- In office January 24, 1936 – April 15, 1939
- President: Franklin D. Roosevelt
- Preceded by: Joseph P. Kennedy Sr.
- Succeeded by: Leon Henderson

Personal details
- Born: William Orville Douglas; October 16, 1898 Maine Township, Minnesota, U.S.
- Died: January 19, 1980 (aged 81) Washington, D.C., U.S.
- Resting place: Arlington National Cemetery
- Party: Democratic
- Spouses: Mildred Riddle (m. 1923; div. 1953); Mercedes Hester Davidson (m. 1954; div. 1963); Joan Martin (m. 1963; div. 1966); Cathleen Heffernan (m. 1966)
- Children: 2
- Education: Whitman College (BA); Columbia University (LLB)

Military service
- Allegiance: United States
- Branch/service: United States Army
- Years of service: 1918
- Rank: Private
- Unit: Reserve Officers' Training Corps; Student Army Training Corps, Whitman College
- Battles/wars: World War I

William Orville Douglas (October 16, 1898 – January 19, 1980) was an American jurist who served as an associate justice of the Supreme Court of the United States from 1939 to 1975. Douglas was known for his strong progressive and civil libertarian views and is often cited as the most liberal justice in the U.S. Supreme Court’s history. Nominated by President Franklin D. Roosevelt in 1939, Douglas was confirmed at the age of 40, becoming one of the youngest justices appointed to the court. He is the longest-serving U.S. Supreme Court justice in history, having served for 36 years and 209 days.

After a childhood in which he moved frequently, Douglas attended Whitman College on a scholarship. He graduated from Columbia Law School in 1925 and joined the Yale Law School faculty. After serving as the third chairman of the Securities and Exchange Commission, Douglas was successfully nominated to the Supreme Court in 1939, succeeding Justice Louis Brandeis. He was among those seriously considered for the 1944 Democratic vice presidential nomination and was subject to an unsuccessful draft movement prior to the 1948 U.S. presidential election. Douglas served on the Court until his retirement in 1975 and was succeeded by John Paul Stevens. Douglas holds a number of records as a Supreme Court justice, including the most opinions.

One of Douglas's most notable opinions was Griswold v. Connecticut (1965), which established the constitutional right to privacy and was foundational to later cases such as Eisenstadt v. Baird, Roe v. Wade, Lawrence v. Texas and Obergefell v. Hodges. His other notable opinions included Skinner v. Oklahoma (1942), United States v. Paramount Pictures, Inc. (1948), Terminiello v. City of Chicago (1949), Monroe v. Pape (1961) Brady v. Maryland (1963), and Harper v. Virginia State Board of Elections (1966). Douglas joined the unanimous opinion in Brown v. Board of Education (1954), which outlawed segregation in American public schools. He wrote notable concurring or dissenting opinions in Dennis v. United States (1951), United States v. O’Brien (1968), Terry v. Ohio (1968), and Brandenburg v. Ohio (1969). He was a strong opponent of the Vietnam War and an ardent advocate of environmentalism.

== Early life and education ==
Douglas was born in 1898 in Maine Township, Otter Tail County, Minnesota, to William Douglas and Julia Bickford Fisk. Douglas's father was a Scottish itinerant Presbyterian minister from Pictou County, Nova Scotia. The family first moved to California and then to Cleveland, Washington. Douglas said he suffered from an illness at age two that he described as polio, although a biographer reveals that it was intestinal colic. His mother attributed his recovery to a miracle, telling Douglas that one day he would be President of the United States.

His father died in Portland, Oregon in 1904, when Douglas was six years old. Douglas later claimed his mother had been left destitute. After moving the family from town to town in the West, his mother, with three young children, settled in Yakima, Washington. William, like the rest of the Douglas family, did odd jobs to earn extra money, and a college education appeared to be unaffordable. He was the valedictorian at Yakima High School and did well enough in school to earn a full academic scholarship to attend Whitman College in Walla Walla, Washington.

At Whitman, Douglas became a member of Beta Theta Pi fraternity. He worked at various jobs while attending school, including as a waiter and janitor during the school year, and at a cherry orchard in the summer. Picking cherries, Douglas would say later, inspired him to pursue a legal career. He once said of his early interest in the law:

I worked among the very, very poor, the migrant laborers, the Chicanos and the I.W.W's who I saw being shot at by the police. I saw cruelty and hardness, and my impulse was to be a force in other developments in the law.

Douglas was inducted into Phi Beta Kappa, participated on the debate team, and was elected as student body president in his final year. After graduating in 1920 with a Bachelor of Arts degree in English and economics, he taught English and Latin at his old high school for the next two years, hoping to earn enough to attend law school. "Finally," he said, "I decided it was impossible to save enough money by teaching and I said to hell with it."

== Military service ==
In the summer of 1918, Douglas took part in a U.S. Army Reserve Officers' Training Corps training encampment at the Presidio of San Francisco. That fall, he joined the Student Army Training Corps at Whitman as a private. He served from October to December, and was honorably discharged because the Armistice of November 11, 1918 ended the war and the army's requirements for more soldiers and officers.

== Law school ==
He traveled by train from Yakima to New York in 1922, taking a job tending sheep on a Chicago-bound train, in return for free passage, with hopes to attend the Columbia Law School. Douglas drew on his Beta Theta Pi membership to help him survive in New York, as he stayed at one of its houses and was able to borrow $75 from a fraternity brother from Washington, enough to enroll at Columbia. Six months later, Douglas's funds were running out. The appointments office at the law school told him that a New York firm wanted a student to help prepare a correspondence course in law. Douglas earned $600 for his work, enabling him to stay in school. Hired for similar projects, he saved $1,000 by semester's end. In August 1923, Douglas traveled to La Grande, Oregon, to marry Mildred Riddle, whom he had known in Yakima. Douglas graduated from Columbia in 1925 with a Bachelor of Laws degree, ranked second in his class.

During the summer of 1925, Douglas started work at the firm of Cravath, DeGersdorff, Swaine and Wood (later Cravath, Swaine & Moore) after failing to obtain a Supreme Court clerkship with Harlan F. Stone. Douglas was hired at Cravath by attorney John J. McCloy, who later became the chairman of the Board of Chase Manhattan Bank.

== Yale Law School ==
Douglas quit Cravath after four months. After one year, he moved back to Yakima but soon regretted the move and never practiced law in Washington. Douglas was an assistant professor of law at Columbia Law School from 1926 to 1928. In 1928, he joined the faculty of Yale Law School, where he became an expert on commercial litigation and bankruptcy law. He was identified with the legal realist movement, which pushed for an understanding of law based less on formalistic legal doctrines and more on the real-world effects of the law. Teaching at Yale, he and his fellow professor Thurman Arnold were riding the New Haven Railroad and were inspired to set the sign Passengers will please refrain... to Antonín Dvořák's Humoresque #7. Robert Maynard Hutchins described Douglas as "the most outstanding law professor in the nation." When Hutchins became president of the University of Chicago, Douglas accepted an offer to move there, but he changed his mind after he was made a Sterling Professor at Yale.

== Securities and Exchange Commission ==
In 1934, Douglas left Yale after President Franklin Roosevelt nominated him to the Securities and Exchange Commission (SEC). By 1937, he had become an adviser and friend to the President and the chairman. That same year, Roosevelt promoted him to Chairman of the SEC, replacing James M. Landis. He also became friends with a group of young New Dealers, including Tommy "The Cork" Corcoran and Abraham Fortas. He was also close, both socially and in thinking to the Progressives of the era, such as Philip and Robert La Follette Jr. That social/political group befriended Lyndon Johnson, a freshman representative from the 10th District of Texas. In his 1982 book The Years of Lyndon Johnson: The Path to Power, Robert Caro wrote that in 1937, Douglas had helped to persuade Roosevelt to authorize the Marshall Ford Dam, a controversial project whose approval enabled Johnson to consolidate his power as a representative.

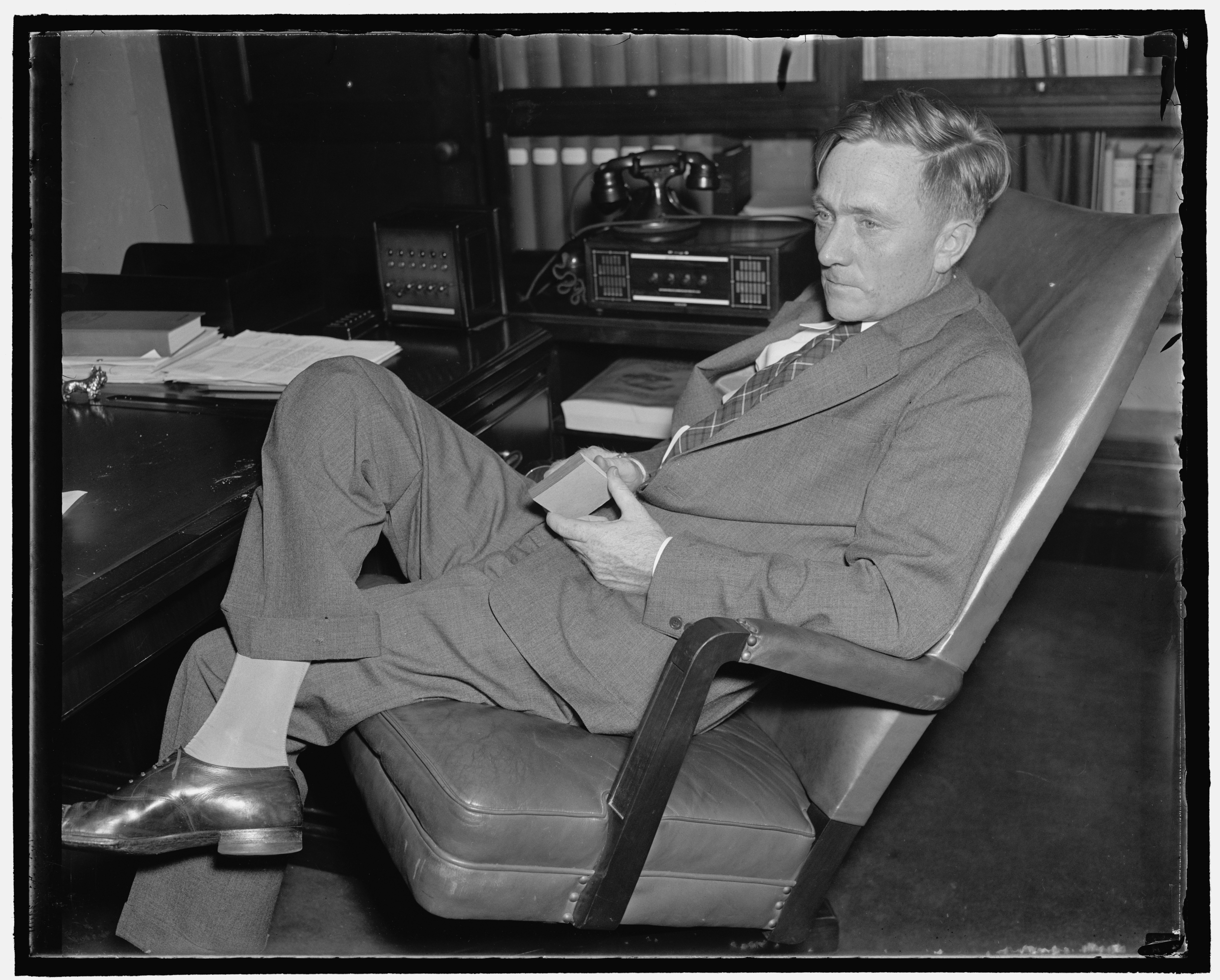
Douglas in 1937, as SEC Chairman

== Supreme Court ==
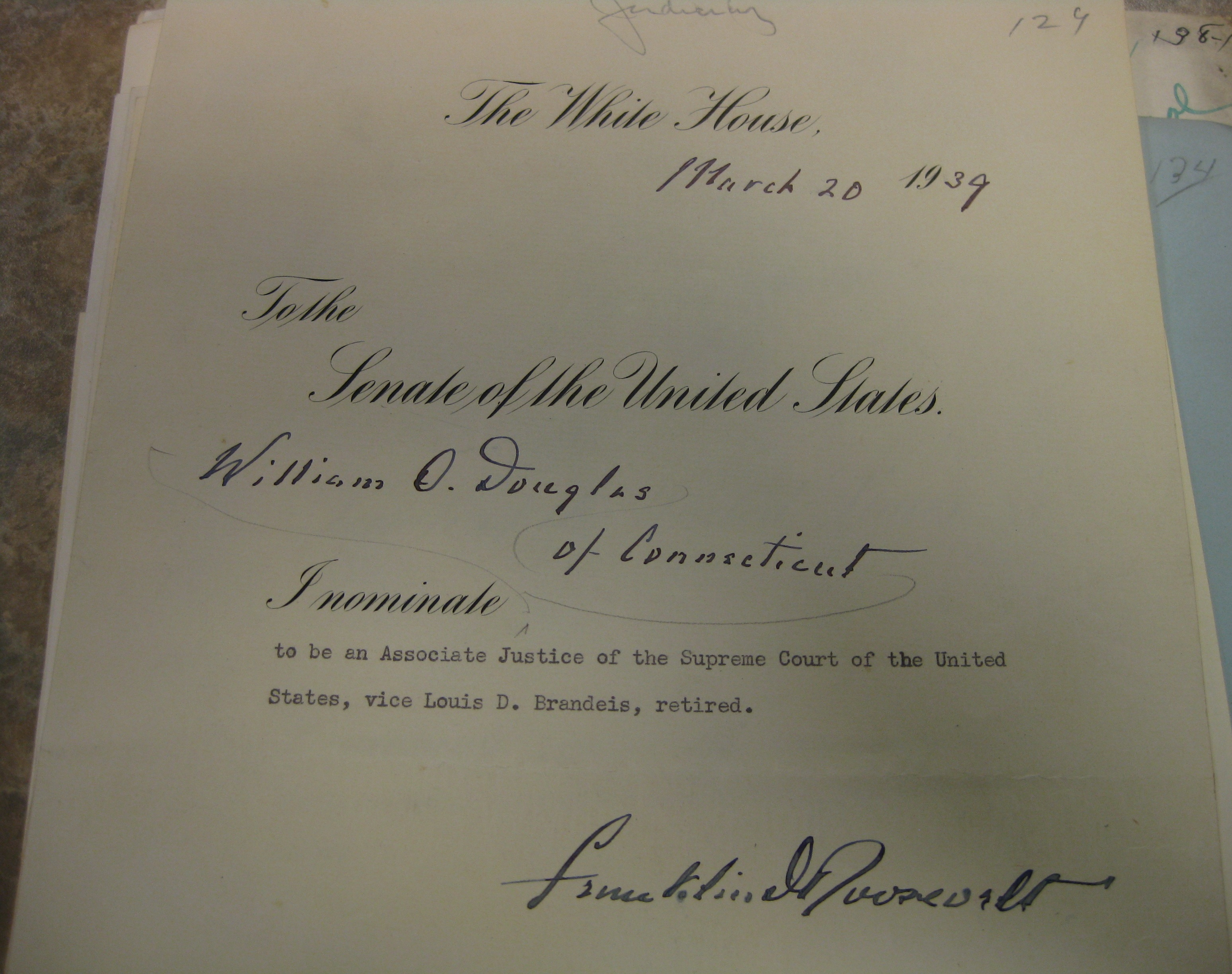
Douglas's Supreme Court nomination

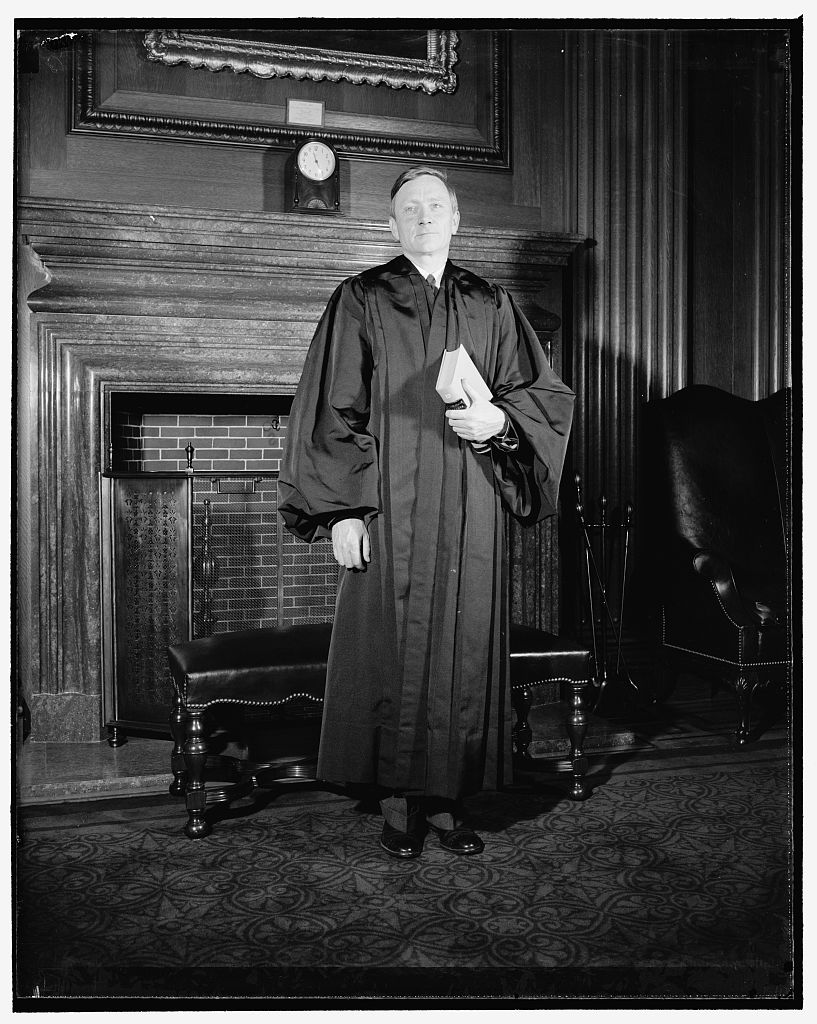
Justice William O. Douglas

In 1939, Justice Louis D. Brandeis retired from the Court, and on March 20 Roosevelt nominated Douglas as his replacement. Douglas was Brandeis's personal choice to be his successor. Douglas later revealed that his appointment had been a great surprise to him (Roosevelt had summoned him to an "important meeting"), and Douglas feared that he would be named as the chairman of the Federal Communications Commission. He was confirmed by the United States Senate on April 4 by a vote of 62 to 4. The four negative votes were all cast by Republicans: Lynn J. Frazier, Henry Cabot Lodge Jr., Gerald P. Nye, and Clyde M. Reed. Douglas was sworn into office on April 17, 1939, becoming, at age 40, the fifth-youngest justice to be confirmed to the Supreme Court. (Note: Joseph Story (32), William Johnson (32), Bushrod Washington (36), and James Iredell (38) were younger.)

=== Relationships with others at Supreme Court ===
Douglas was often at odds with fellow justice Felix Frankfurter, who believed in judicial restraint and thought the court should stay out of politics. Douglas did not highly value judicial consistency or stare decisis when deciding cases. "But the origin of Douglas and Frankfurter's deep-seated animosity went beyond important jurisprudential differences. Temperamentally, they were opposites. From the beginning of their close associations as justices, the two men simply grated on each other's nerves.... Although in 1974 Douglas claimed that there had been no 'war' between him and Frankfurter, the evidence to the contrary was overwhelming. Frankfurter and Douglas, two important American jurists whose decades-long bitter debates (indeed, whose 'wars') contributed a great deal to our understanding of constitutionalism in a modern society, could not tolerate each other. Intentionally and unintentionally, they went out of their way to harass each other for over two decades."

Judge Richard A. Posner, who was a law clerk for justice William J. Brennan Jr. during the latter part of Douglas's tenure, characterized Douglas as "a bored, distracted, uncollegial, irresponsible" Supreme Court justice, as well as "rude, ice-cold, hot-tempered, ungrateful, foul-mouthed, self-absorbed" and so abusive in "treatment of his staff to the point where his law clerks—whom he described as 'the lowest form of human life'—took to calling him "shithead" behind his back." Posner asserts also that "Douglas's judicial oeuvre is slipshod and slapdash," but Douglas's "intelligence, his energy, his academic and government experience, his flair for writing, the leadership skills that he had displayed at the SEC, and his ability to charm when he bothered to try" could have let him "become the greatest justice in history." Brennan once stated that Douglas was one of only "two geniuses" he had met in his life (the other being Posner).

=== Judicial philosophy ===
Legal scholars have noted that Douglas's judicial style was unusual in that he generally did not attempt to elaborate justifications for his judicial positions on the basis of text, history, or precedent. Douglas was known for writing short, pithy opinions that relied on philosophical insights, observations about current politics, and literature as much as more conventional judicial sources. Douglas wrote many of his opinions in twenty minutes, often publishing the first draft. Douglas was also known for his fearsome work ethic, publishing over thirty books and once telling an exhausted secretary, Fay Aull, "If you hadn't stopped working, you wouldn't be tired."

Douglas frequently disagreed with the other justices, dissenting in almost 40 percent of cases, more than half of the time writing only for himself. Ronald Dworkin argued that because Douglas believed his convictions were merely "a matter of his own emotional biases," Douglas would fail to meet "minimal intellectual responsibilities." Ultimately, Douglas believed that a judge's role was "not neutral" because, as he wrote, "The Constitution is not neutral. It was designed to take the government off the backs of the people."

Douglas has been widely characterized as a civil libertarian, and was in fact described upon his 1975 retirement by Time magazine as "the most doctrinaire and committed civil libertarian ever to sit on the court". On the bench, Douglas became known as a strong advocate of First Amendment rights. With fellow justice Hugo Black, Douglas argued for a "literalist" interpretation of the First Amendment, insisting that the First Amendment's command that "no law" shall restrict freedom of speech should be interpreted literally. He wrote the opinion in Terminiello v. City of Chicago (1949), overturning the conviction of a Catholic priest who allegedly caused a "breach of the peace" by making anti-Semitic comments during a raucous public speech. Douglas, joined by Black, furthered his advocacy of a broad reading of First Amendment rights by dissenting from the Supreme Court's decision in Dennis v. United States (1952), which affirmed the conviction of the leader of the U.S. Communist Party. Douglas was publicly critical of censorship, saying, "The way to combat noxious ideas is with other ideas. The way to combat falsehoods is with truth."

Douglas voted with the majority to uphold the wartime internment of Japanese Americans in Korematsu v. United States (1944) despite having initially planned to dissent, a vote he later regretted. Over the course of his career, he grew to become a leading advocate of individual rights. He was suspicious of majority rule as it related to social and moral questions, and he frequently expressed concern about forced conformity with "the establishment". For example, Douglas wrote the majority opinion in Griswold v. Connecticut (1965), which stated that a constitutional right to privacy forbids state contraception bans because "specific guarantees in the Bill of Rights have penumbras, formed by emanations from those guarantees that help give them life and substance." That went too far for Hugo Black, who dissented in Griswold despite generally having been allies with Douglas with respect to civil rights. Justice Clarence Thomas would years later hang a sign in his chambers reading, "Please don't emanate in the penumbras." Conservative Judge Robert Bork, on the other hand, had no objection to the concept of penumbras, writing, "There is nothing exceptional about [Douglas's] thought, other than the language of penumbras and emanations. Courts often give protection to a constitutional freedom by creating a buffer zone, by prohibiting a government from doing something not in itself forbidden but likely to lead to an invasion of a right specified in the Constitution." Prof. David P. Currie of the University of Chicago Law School called Douglas's Griswold opinion "one of the most hypocritical opinions in the history of the Court."

Douglas and Black also disagreed in Fortson v. Morris (1967), which cleared the path for the Georgia State Legislature to choose the governor in the deadlocked 1966 race between Democrat Lester Maddox and Republican Howard Callaway. Whereas Black voted with the majority under strict construction to uphold the state constitutional provision, Douglas and Abe Fortas dissented. According to Douglas, Georgia tradition would guarantee a Maddox victory, but he had trailed Callaway by some 3,000 votes in the general election returns. Douglas also saw the issue as a continuation of the earlier decision Gray v. Sanders, which had struck down Georgia's County Unit System, a kind of electoral college formerly used to choose the governor. According to political scientists Andrew D. Martin and Kevin M. Quinn, he was by far the most liberal justice in the history of the Supreme Court, with a Martin-Quinn score of -8 at his most liberal. He voted to strike down the death penalty in Furman v. Georgia (1972), argued that the environment should be granted legal personhood, argued that the Vietnam War was unconstitutional because Congress had never declared war, and generally mounted an uncompromising defense of individual rights from which even typically stalwart liberals like William Brennan and Thurgood Marshall sometimes shied away.

Douglas was notable as a public pre-Stonewall supporter of gay rights. Douglas dissented in Boutilier v. INS (1967), in which the Court ruled that gay and lesbian sexualities were included in the list of “psychopathic personalities” that Congress could deport, arguing that the term “psychopathic personality” was unconstitutionally vague, and that even if it were not, not all gay and lesbian people are psychopaths. In 1968, in a concurring opinion in the case of Flast v. Cohen (1968), Douglas indicated that he did not believe in judicial restraint:

There has long been a school of thought here that the less the judiciary does, the better. It is often said that judicial intrusion should be infrequent, since it is "always attended with a serious evil, namely, that the correction of legislative mistakes comes from the outside, and the people thus lose the political experience, and the moral education and stimulus that come from fighting the question out in the ordinary way, and correcting their own errors"; that the effect of a participation by the judiciary in these processes is "to dwarf the political capacity of the people, and to deaden its sense of moral responsibility." J. Thayer, John Marshall 106, 107 (1901).¶ The late Edmond Cahn, who opposed that view, stated my philosophy. He emphasized the importance of the role that the federal judiciary was designed to play in guarding basic rights against majoritarian control. ... His description of our constitutional tradition was in these words: "Be not reasonable with inquisitions, anonymous informers, and secret files that mock American justice. Be not reasonable with punitive denationalizations, ex post facto deportations, labels of disloyalty, and all the other stratagems for outlawing human beings from the community of mankind. These devices have put us to shame. Exercise the full judicial power of the United States; nullify them, forbid them, and make us proud again." Can the Supreme Court Defend Civil Liberties? in Samuel, ed., Toward a Better America 132, 144 -145 (1968).

Douglas' first law clerk David Ginsburg wrote that "critics have sometimes charged that [Douglas] was result oriented and guilty of oversimplification; those who understand how he thought, and who share his compassion, conscience, and sense of fair dealing, see him as courageous and farsighted." Legal scholar David P. Currie has argued that "there is no necessary contradiction between these two views."

=== Rosenberg case ===
On June 17, 1953, Douglas granted a temporary stay of execution to Ethel and Julius Rosenberg, who had been convicted of selling the plans for the atomic bomb to the Soviet Union during the Cold War. The basis for the stay was that Judge Irving Kaufman had sentenced the Rosenbergs to death without the consent of the jury. While this was permissible under the Espionage Act of 1917, under which the Rosenbergs were tried, a later law, the Atomic Energy Act of 1946, held that only a jury could pronounce the death penalty. Since at the time the stay was granted the Supreme Court was out of session, this stay meant that the Rosenbergs could expect to wait at least six months before the case was heard.

When Attorney General Herbert Brownell heard about the stay, he immediately took his objection to Chief Justice Fred M. Vinson, who reconvened the Court before the appointed date and set aside the stay. Douglas had departed for vacation, but returned to Washington on learning of the special session of the Court. Because of widespread opposition to his decision, Douglas briefly faced impeachment proceedings in Congress proposed by Representative Don Wheeler, but attempts to remove him from the Court went nowhere.

=== Vietnam War ===
Douglas took strong positions on the Vietnam War. In 1952, Douglas traveled to Vietnam and met with Ho Chi Minh. During the trip, Douglas became friendly with Ngô Đình Diệm, and in 1953 he personally introduced the nationalist leader to senators Mike Mansfield and John F. Kennedy. Douglas became one of the chief promoters for U.S. support of Diệm, with CIA deputy director Robert Amory crediting Diệm becoming "our man in Indochina" to a conversation with Douglas during a party at Martin Agronsky's house.

After Diệm's assassination in November 1963, Douglas became strongly critical of the war, believing that Diệm had been killed because he "was not sufficiently servile to Pentagon demands." Douglas now outspokenly argued that the war was illegal, dissenting whenever the Court passed on an opportunity to hear such claims. In 1968, Douglas issued an order blocking the shipment of Army reservists to Vietnam, before the eight other justices unanimously reversed him.

In Schlesinger v. Holtzman (1973), Justice Thurgood Marshall issued an in-chambers opinion declining Rep. Elizabeth Holtzman's request for a court order stopping the military from bombing Cambodia. The Court was in recess for the summer, but the Congresswoman reapplied to Douglas. Douglas met with Holtzman's ACLU lawyers at his home in Goose Prairie, Washington, and promised them a hearing the next day. On Friday, August 3, 1973, Douglas held a hearing in the Yakima federal courthouse, where he dismissed the Government's argument that he was causing a "constitutional confrontation" by saying, "we live in a world of confrontations. That's what the whole system is about." On August 4, Douglas ordered the military to stop bombing, reasoning "denial of the application before me would catapult our airmen as well as Cambodian peasants into the death zone." The U.S. military ignored Douglas's order. Six hours later, the eight other justices reconvened by telephone for a special term and unanimously overturned Douglas's ruling.

=== "Trees have standing" ===
Douglas was highly innovative in legal theory. For example, in his dissenting opinion in the landmark environmental law case Sierra Club v. Morton (1972), Douglas argued that "inanimate objects" should have standing to sue in court:

The critical question of "standing" would be simplified and also put neatly in focus if we fashioned a federal rule that allowed environmental issues to be litigated before federal agencies or federal courts in the name of the inanimate object about to be despoiled, defaced, or invaded by roads and bulldozers and where injury is the subject of public outrage. Contemporary public concern for protecting nature's ecological equilibrium should lead to the conferral of standing upon environmental objects to sue for their own preservation. This suit would therefore be more properly labeled as Mineral King v. Morton.

He continued:

Inanimate objects are sometimes parties in litigation. A ship has a legal personality, a fiction found useful for maritime purposes. The corporation sole—a creature of ecclesiastical law—is an acceptable adversary and large fortunes ride on its cases ... So it should be as respects valleys, alpine meadows, rivers, lakes, estuaries, beaches, ridges, groves of trees, swampland, or even air that feels the destructive pressures of modern technology and modern life. The river, for example, is the living symbol of all the life it sustains or nourishes—fish, aquatic insects, water ouzels, otter, fisher, deer, elk, bear, and all other animals, including man, who are dependent on it or who enjoy it for its sight, its sound, or its life. The river as plaintiff speaks for the ecological unit of life that is part of it.

Douglas biographer M. Margaret McKeown argued that he was influenced in his opinion by reading a pre-publication copy of Southern California Law Review article "Should Trees Have Standing? – Toward Legal Rights for Natural Objects", in which author Christopher Stone advanced an argument that would later be the basis for the legal concepts of environmental personhood and rights of nature.

== Environmentalism ==
Douglas was a lifelong mountaineer. In his autobiographical Of Men and Mountains (1950), he discusses his close childhood connections with nature. In the 1950s, proposals were made to create a highway along the path of the C&O Canal, which ran on the Maryland bank parallel to the Potomac River. The Washington Post editorial page supported the action. However, Douglas, who frequently hiked on the Canal towpath, opposed the plan and challenged the newspaper's editors to hike the 185-mile length of the Canal with him. After the hike (which the journalists were unable to complete), the Post changed its stance and advocated preservation of the Canal in its historic state. Douglas is widely credited with saving the Canal and with its eventual designation as a National Historic Park in 1971. He served on the board of directors of the Sierra Club from 1960 to 1962 and wrote prolifically on his love of the outdoors. In 1962, Douglas wrote a glowing review of Rachel Carson's book Silent Spring, which was included in the widely-read Book-of-the-Month Club edition. He later swayed the Supreme Court to preserve the Red River Gorge in eastern Kentucky, when a proposal to build a dam and flood the gorge reached the Court. Douglas personally visited the area on November 18, 1967. The Red River Gorge's Douglas Trail is named in his honor.

In May 1962, Douglas and his wife, Cathleen, were invited by Neil Compton and the Ozark Society to visit and canoe down part of the free flowing Buffalo River in Arkansas. They put in at the low water bridge at Boxley. That experience made him a fan of the river and the young organization's idea of protecting it. Douglas was instrumental in having the Buffalo preserved as a free-flowing river left in its natural state. The decision was opposed by the region's Corps of Army Engineers. The act that soon followed designated the Buffalo River as America's first National River. Douglas was a self-professed outdoorsman. According to The Thru-Hiker's Companion, a guide published by the Appalachian Long Distance Hikers Association, Douglas hiked the entire 2,000 miles (3,200 km) trail from Georgia to Maine. His love for the environment carried through to his judicial reasoning. His interests in natural history are also reflected in the fact that he collected plant specimens for the herbarium of the University of Texas at Austin. They curate at least 14 vascular plant specimens collected by Douglas together with botanist Donovan Stewart Correll, Head of the Botanical Laboratory, Texas Research Foundation in February and June 1965. The specimens collected in February were from Presidio and Brewster Counties—several from Capote Falls. The specimens collected in June were from Blanco, Gillespie, and Llano Counties—near Austin, Texas. The Rocky Mountain Herbarium at the University of Wyoming curates a lichen collected by William O. Douglas in Snoqualmie National Forest.

Douglas's active role in advocating the preservation and protection of wilderness across the United States earned him the nickname "Wild Bill". Douglas was a friend and frequent guest of Harry R. Truman, the owner of the Mount St. Helens Lodge at Spirit Lake in Washington. Truman would later become known for his death in the 1980 eruption of Mount St. Helens, a few months after Douglas died.

In 1967, on a hike to save Sunfish Pond on the Appalachian Trail in New Jersey, Douglas was accompanied by more than a thousand people. He said: "It's a vital element in the need to save some of our wilderness from the encroachment of civilization."

== Travel writing ==
From 1950 to 1961, Douglas travelled extensively in the Middle East and Asia. Douglas wrote many books about his experiences and observations during these trips. Other than writers from National Geographic—whom he sometimes met on the road—Douglas was one of the few American travel writers to visit these remote regions during this period in time. His travel books include:

- Strange Lands and Friendly People (1950)
- Beyond the High Himalayas (1952)
- North From Malaya (1953)
- Russian Journey (1956)
- Exploring the Himalaya (1958)
- West of the Indus (1958)
- My Wilderness, The Pacific West (1960)
- My Wilderness, East to Katahdin (1961)

In his memoir, The Court Years, Douglas wrote that he was sometimes criticized for taking too much time off from the bench, and writing travel books while on the U.S. Supreme Court. However, Douglas maintained that the travel gave him a world-wide perspective that was helpful in resolving cases before the Court. It also gave him a perspective on political systems that did not benefit from the legal protections in the American Constitution.

== Presidential politics ==
When, in early 1944, President Franklin D. Roosevelt decided not to support the renomination of Vice President Henry A. Wallace at the party's national convention, a short list of possible replacements was drafted. The names on the list included former senator and Supreme Court justice James F. Byrnes of South Carolina, former senator (and future Supreme Court justice) Sherman Minton, former governor and high commissioner to the Philippines Paul McNutt of Indiana, House speaker Sam Rayburn of Texas, Senator Alben W. Barkley of Kentucky, Senator Harry S. Truman of Missouri, and Douglas.

Five days before the vice presidential nominee was to be chosen at the convention, on July 15, Committee chairman Robert E. Hannegan received a letter from Roosevelt stating that his choice for the nominee would be either "Harry Truman or Bill Douglas". After Hannegan released the letter to the convention on July 20, the nomination went without incident, and Truman was nominated on the second ballot. Douglas received two votes on the second ballot and none on the first.

After the convention, Douglas's supporters spread the rumor that the note sent to Hannegan had read "Bill Douglas or Harry Truman", not the other way around. These supporters claimed that Hannegan, a Truman backer, feared that Douglas's nomination would drive Southern white voters away from the ticket (Douglas had a strong anti-segregation record on the Supreme Court) and had switched the names to suggest that Truman was Roosevelt's real choice.

By 1948, Douglas's presidential aspirations were rekindled by Truman's low popularity, after he had succeeded Roosevelt in 1945. Many Democrats, believing that Truman could not be elected in November, began trying to find a replacement candidate. Attempts were made to draft popular retired General Dwight D. Eisenhower, a war hero, for the nomination. A "Draft Douglas" campaign, complete with souvenir buttons and hats, sprang up in New Hampshire and several other primary states. Douglas campaigned for the nomination for a short time, but he soon withdrew his name from consideration.

In the end, Eisenhower refused to be drafted, and Truman won nomination easily. Although Truman approached Douglas about the vice presidential nomination, the justice turned him down. Douglas's close associate Tommy Corcoran was later heard to ask, "Why be a number two man to a number two man?" Truman selected Senator Alben W. Barkley and the two won the election.

== Impeachment attempts ==
Political opponents made two unsuccessful attempts to remove Douglas from the Supreme Court.

=== Rosenberg case ===
On June 17, 1953, U.S. Representative William M. Wheeler of Georgia, infuriated by Douglas's brief stay of execution in the Rosenberg case, introduced a resolution to impeach him. The resolution was referred the next day to the Judiciary Committee to investigate the charges. On July 7, 1953, the committee voted to end the investigation.

=== 1970 impeachment attempt fails ===
Douglas maintained a busy speaking and publishing schedule to supplement his income. He became severely burdened financially because of a bitter divorce and settlement with his first wife. He sustained additional financial setbacks after divorces and settlements with his second and third wives.

Douglas became president of the Parvin Foundation. His ties to the foundation (which was financed by the sale of the infamous Flamingo Hotel by casino financier and foundation benefactor Albert Parvin) became a prime target for House Minority Leader Gerald Ford. Besides being personally disgusted by Douglas's lifestyle, Ford was also mindful that Douglas's protégé Abe Fortas was forced to resign because of ties to a similar foundation. Fortas would later say that he "resigned to save Douglas," thinking that the dual investigations of himself and Douglas would stop with his resignation.

Some scholars have argued that Ford's impeachment attempt was politically motivated. Those who support this contention note Ford's well-known disappointment with the Senate over the failed nominations of Clement Haynsworth and G. Harrold Carswell to succeed Fortas. In April 1970, Ford moved to impeach Douglas in an attempt to hit back at the Senate. House Judiciary Chairman Emanuel Celler handled the case carefully and did not uncover evidence of any criminal conduct by Douglas. Attorney General John N. Mitchell and the Nixon administration worked to gather evidence against him. Ford moved forward with the proceedings.

The hearings began in late April 1970. Ford was the main witness, and attacked Douglas's "liberal opinions", his "defense of the 'filthy' film", the controversial Swedish film I Am Curious (Yellow) (1970), and his ties to Parvin. Douglas was also criticized for accepting $350 for an article he wrote on folk music in the magazine Avant Garde. Its publisher had served a prison sentence for the distribution of another magazine in 1966 that had been deemed obscene by some critics. Describing Douglas's article, Ford stated, "The article itself is not pornographic, although it praises the lusty, lurid, and risqué along with the social protest of left-wing folk singers." Ford also attacked Douglas for publishing an article in Evergreen Review, which he claimed was known to publish photographs of naked women. The Republican congressmen, however, refused to give the majority Democrats copies of the magazines described, prompting Congressman Wayne Hays to remark, "Has anybody read the article – or is everybody over there who has a magazine just looking at the pictures?" As it became clear that the impeachment proceedings would be unsuccessful, they were brought to a close without a public vote.

According to Joshua E. Kastenberg of the University of New Mexico School of Law, there were several purposes behind Ford's and Nixon's push to have Douglas impeached. First, while it was true that Nixon and Ford were angered at the Senate's determination not to confirm Haynsworth and Carswell, Nixon had a deep-seated hatred of Douglas. An attempt to have Douglas impeached and then brought to a Senate trial would further cement the alleged "Southern Strategy", as most of Ford's congressional allies against Douglas were Southern Democrats. Additionally, Nixon and Kissinger had secretly planned for an April 30 – May 1 invasion of Cambodia and Nixon thought that there was a possibility of using a House investigation into Douglas to deflect news coverage. Professor Kastenberg notes in his recent book on the subject that Attorney General John Mitchell and his deputy, William Wilson, had promised Ford that the Central Intelligence Agency, the Securities and Exchange Commission, the Internal Revenue Service, and the Federal Bureau of Investigation had evidence of Douglas's criminal conduct. In the end, however, none of these agencies had any evidence of wrongdoing by Douglas, but the promise led Ford to accuse Douglas of consorting with organized crime and Communists, and therefore of being a threat to national security.

Around this time, Douglas came to believe that strangers snooping around his Washington home were FBI agents, attempting to plant marijuana to entrap him. In a private letter to his neighbors, he said: "I wrote you last fall or winter that federal agents were in Yakima and Goose Prairie looking me over at Goose Prairie. I thought they were merely counting fence posts. But I learned in New York City yesterday that they were planting marijuana with the prospect of a nice big TV-covered raid in July or August. I forgot to tell you that this gang in power is not in search of truth. They are 'search and destroy' people."

== Judicial record-setter ==
During his tenure on the Supreme Court, Douglas set a number of records, all of which still stand. He sat on the U.S. Supreme Court for more than thirty-six years (1939–75), longer than any other justice. During those years, he wrote some thirty books in addition to his opinions and dissenting opinions and gave more speeches than any other justice. Douglas had the most marriages (four) and the most divorces (three) of any justice serving on the bench.

== Nicknames ==
During his time on the Supreme Court, Douglas picked up a number of nicknames from both admirers and detractors. The most common epithet was "Wild Bill" in reference to his independent and often-unpredictable stances and his cowboy-style mannerisms, but many of the latter were considered by some to be affectations for the consumption of the press.

== Retirement ==
Since the 1970 impeachment hearings, Douglas had wanted to retire from the Court. He wrote to his friend and former student Abe Fortas: "My ideas are way out of line with current trends, and I see no particular point in staying around and being obnoxious." However, he did not want to do so when a Republican was in the White House and would nominate his successor, saying "I won't resign while there's a breath in my body —until we get a Democratic President."

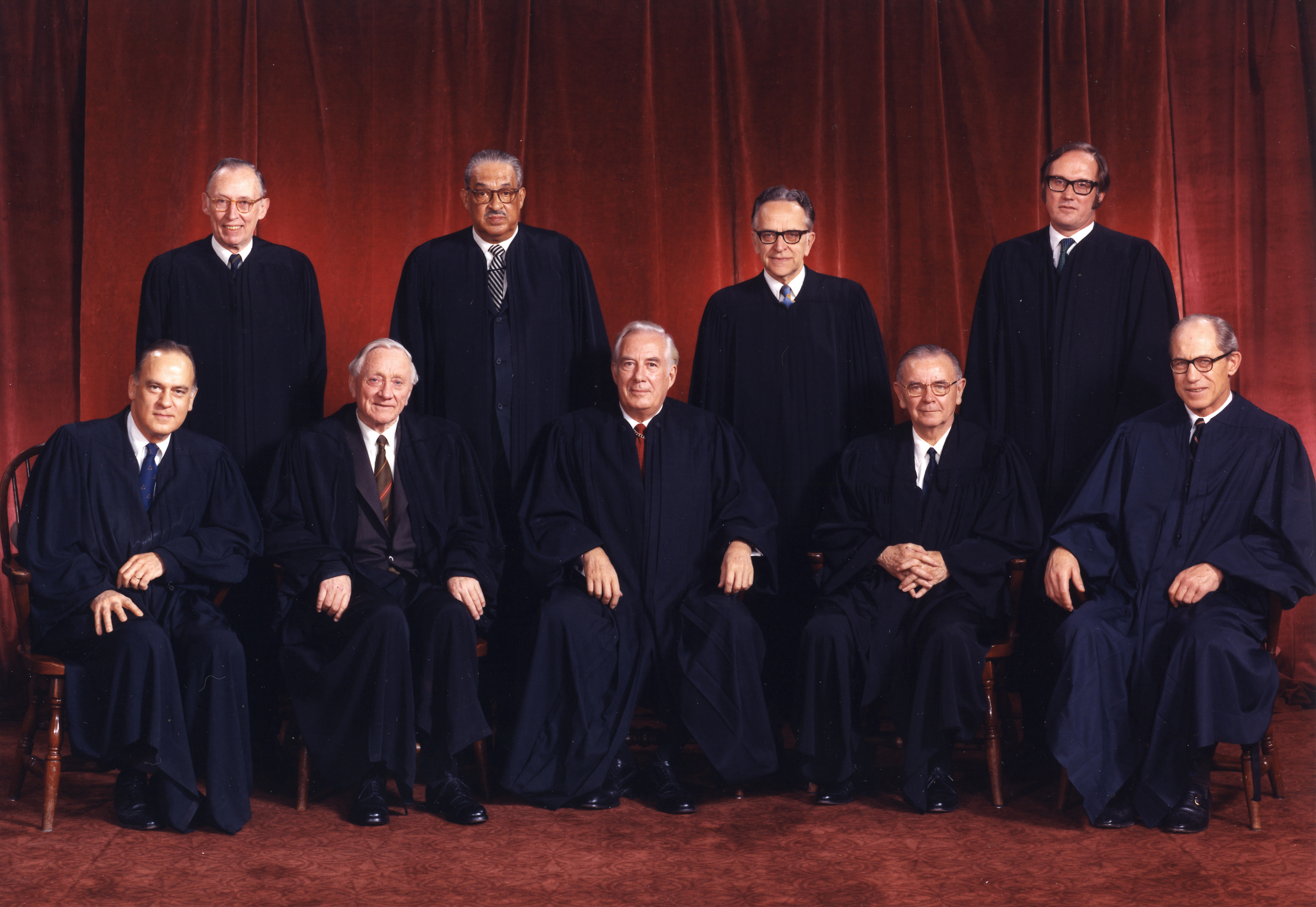
1973 Supreme Court group photo with Justice Douglas sitting second from the left on the front row

At 76 on December 31, 1974, on vacation with his wife Cathleen in the Bahamas, Douglas suffered a debilitating stroke in the right hemisphere of his brain. It paralyzed his left leg and forced him to use a wheelchair. Douglas was severely disabled but insisted on continuing to participate in Supreme Court affairs despite his obvious incapacity. Seven of his fellow justices (with Byron White vehemently disagreeing) voted to postpone until the next term any argued case in which Douglas's vote might make a difference. Douglas finally retired on November 12, 1975, after 36 years of service. He was Franklin Roosevelt's last sitting Supreme Court justice. Indeed, Douglas had outlasted the last of Harry S. Truman's appointments by eight years and was the last sitting justice to have served on the Hughes, Stone, and Vinson Courts.

Douglas's formal resignation was submitted, as required by federal protocols, to his longtime political nemesis, then-President Gerald Ford. In his response, Ford put aside previous differences and paid tribute to the retiring justice:

May I express on behalf of all our countrymen this nation's great gratitude for your more than thirty-six years as a member of the Supreme Court. Your distinguished years of service are unequaled in all the history of the Court.

Ford hosted William and Cathleen Douglas as honored guests at a White House state dinner later that month. Ford later said of the occasion, "We had had differences in the past, but I wanted to stress that bygones were bygones."

Douglas maintained that he could assume judicial senior status on the Court and attempted to continue serving in that capacity, according to authors Bob Woodward and Scott Armstrong. He refused to accept his retirement and tried to participate in the Court's cases well into 1976, after John Paul Stevens had taken his former seat. Douglas reacted with outrage when, returning to his old chambers, he discovered that his clerks had been reassigned to Stevens and when he tried to file opinions for cases in which he had heard arguments before his retirement, Chief Justice Warren E. Burger ordered all justices, clerks, and other staff members to refuse help to Douglas in those efforts. When Douglas tried in March 1976 to hear arguments in a capital-punishment case, Gregg v. Georgia, the nine sitting justices signed a formal letter informing him that his retirement had ended his official duties on the Court. It was only then that Douglas withdrew from Supreme Court business.

One commentator has attributed some of his behavior after his stroke to anosognosia, which can lead an affected person to be unaware and unable to acknowledge disease in himself, and often results in defects in reasoning, decision-making, emotions, and feeling.

== Personal life ==
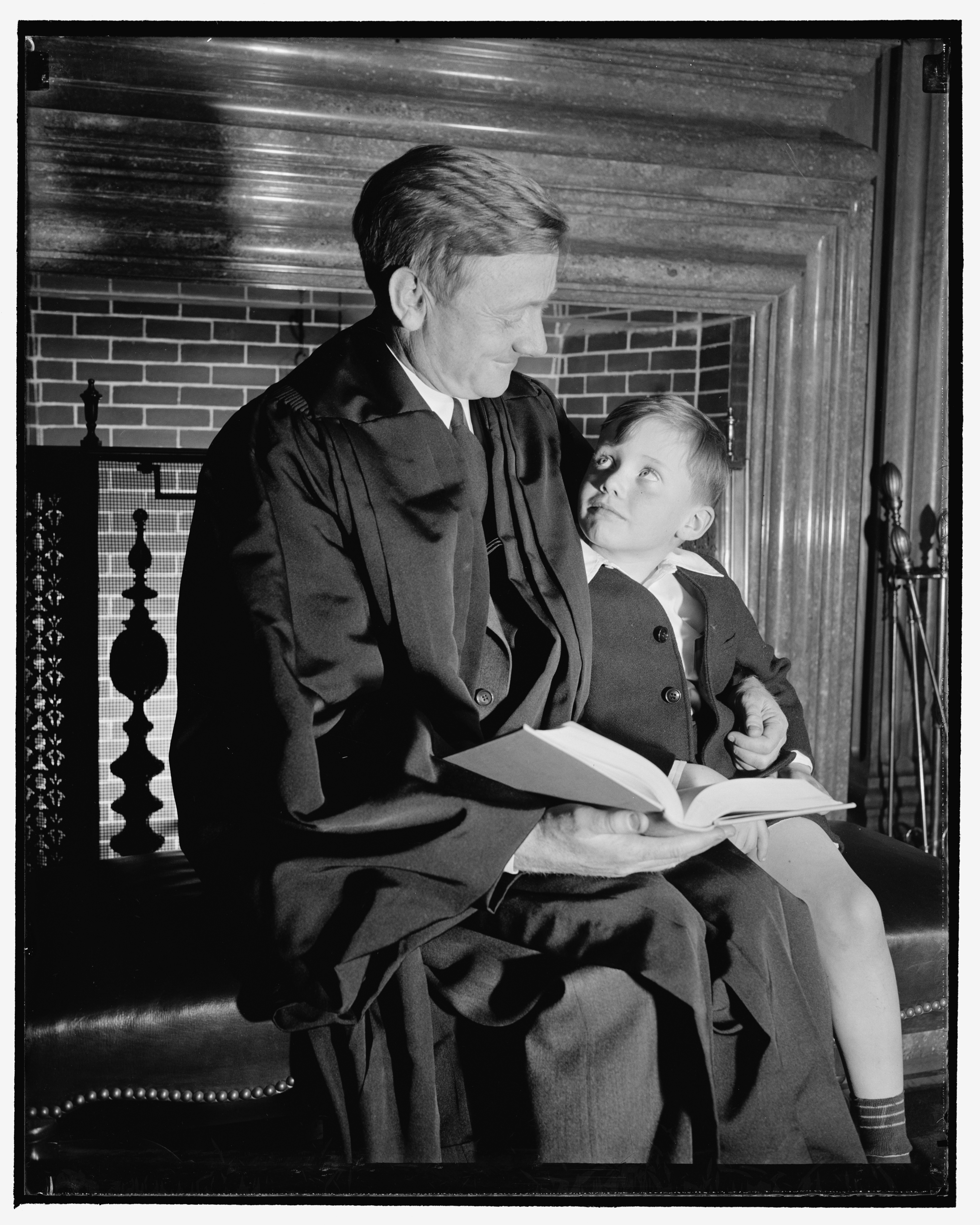
Douglas and his son William O. Douglas Jr. in Washington, D.C., on April 17, 1939

Douglas's first wife was Mildred Riddle, a teacher at North Yakima High School six years his senior, whom he married on August 16, 1923. They had two children, Mildred and William Jr. William Douglas Jr. became an actor, playing Gerald Zinser in PT 109.

On October 2, 1949, Douglas had thirteen of his ribs broken after he got thrown by a horse and he tumbled down a rocky hillside. As a result of his injuries, Douglas did not return to the Court until March 1950 and did not take part in many of that term's cases. Four months after his return to the court, Douglas had to be hospitalized again when he was kicked by a horse.

Douglas divorced Riddle in July 1953. Douglas's former friend Thomas Gardiner Corcoran represented Riddle in the divorce, securing alimony with an "escalator clause" that gave Douglas a financial motivation to publish more books. Douglas was not informed about Riddle's 1969 death until several months had passed because his children had stopped talking to him.

While still married to Riddle, Douglas began openly pursuing Mercedes Hester Davidson in 1951. Other justices at the time kept mistresses as secretaries or kept them away from the Court building according to Douglas's messenger Harry Datcher, but Douglas "did what he did in the open. He didn't give a damn what people thought of him." Douglas married Davidson on December 14, 1954.

In 1961, Douglas pursued Joan C. "Joanie" Martin, an Allegheny College student writing her thesis about him. In the summer of 1963, he divorced Davidson; on August 5, 1963, at the age of 64, Douglas married Martin, who was then 23. Douglas and Martin divorced in 1966.

On July 15, 1966, Douglas married Cathleen Heffernan, then a 22-year-old student at Marylhurst College. They met when he was vacationing at Mount St. Helens Lodge, a mountain wilderness lodge in Washington state at Spirit Lake, where she was working for the summer as a waitress. Though their age difference was a subject of national controversy at the time of their marriage, they remained together until his death in 1980.

For much of his life, Douglas was dogged by various rumors and allegations about his private life, originating from political rivals and other detractors of his liberal legal opinions on the Court—often a matter of controversy. In one such instance in 1966, Republican Representative Bob Dole of Kansas attributed his court decisions to his "bad judgment from a matrimonial standpoint". Several other Republican members of Congress introduced resolutions in the House of Representatives, though none ever passed, that called for investigation of Douglas's moral character.

Daniel Pierce Thompson was Douglas's great-granduncle.

== Death ==
Four years after retiring from the Supreme Court, Douglas died on January 19, 1980, at age 81, at Walter Reed Army Medical Center in Washington, D.C. He was survived by his fourth wife, Cathleen Douglas, and two children, Mildred and William Jr., with his first wife.

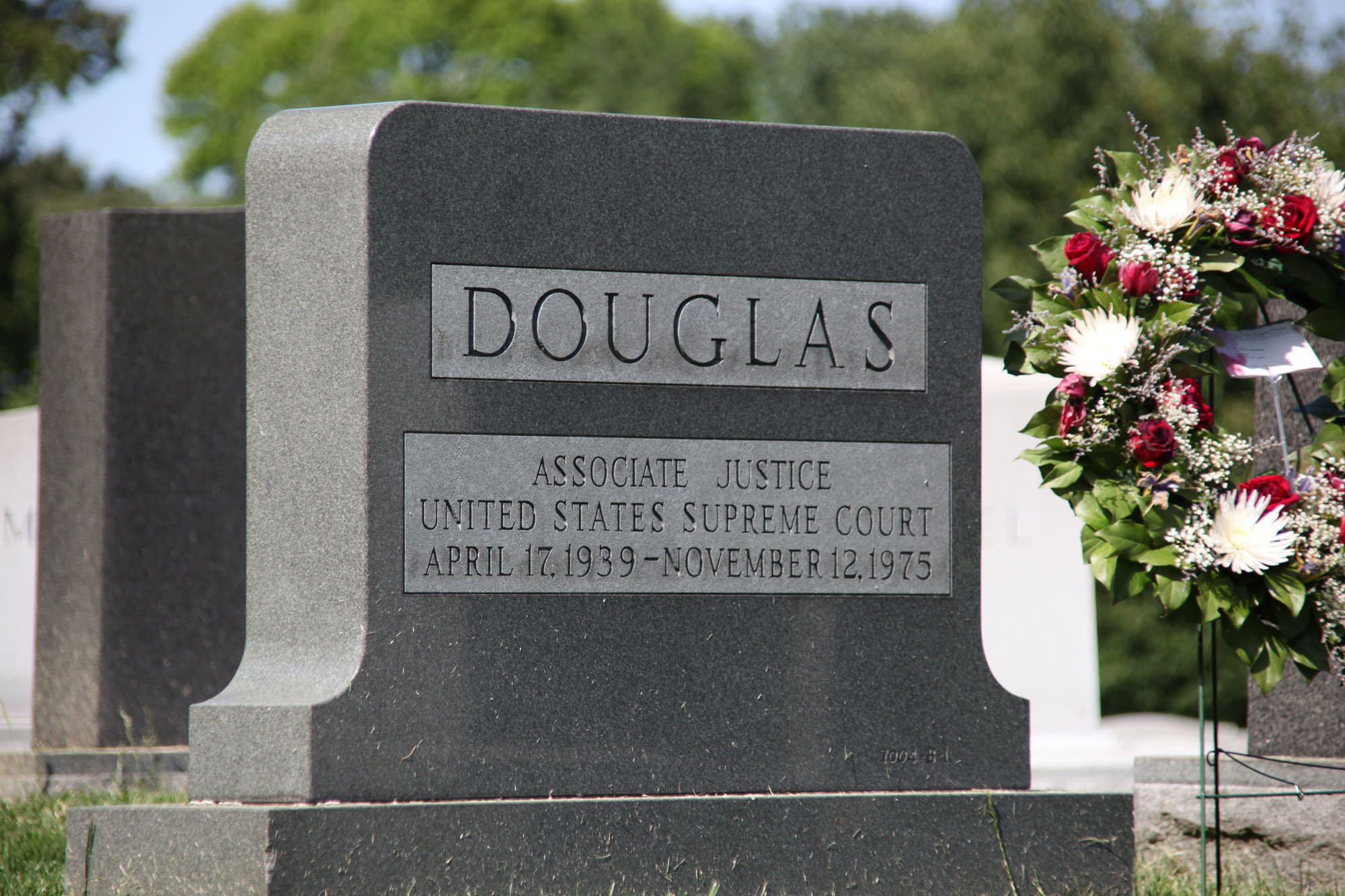
Grave of William O. Douglas at Arlington National Cemetery.

Douglas is interred in Section 5 of Arlington National Cemetery near the graves of eight other former Supreme Court justices: Oliver Wendell Holmes Jr., Warren E. Burger, William Rehnquist, Hugo Black, Potter Stewart, William J. Brennan, Thurgood Marshall, and Harry Blackmun. Throughout his life Douglas claimed he had been a U.S. Army private during World War I, which was inscribed on his headstone. Some historians, including biographer Bruce Murphy, asserted that this claim was false, although Murphy later added, according to Washington Post editorial writer Charles Lane, that Douglas's "career on the court makes it 'appropriate'" that he be buried in Arlington Cemetery.

Lane engaged in further research—consulting applicable provisions of the relevant federal statutes, locating Douglas's honorable discharge and speaking with Arlington Cemetery staff. Records in the Library of Congress showed that from June to December 1918, Douglas served in the SATC as (what the War Department's regulations termed) "a soldier in the Army of the United States ... placed upon active-duty status immediately." Tom Sherlock, Arlington's official historian, told Lane that an "active-duty recruit whose service was limited to boot camp would qualify" to be buried in Arlington. Lane therefore concluded, "Legally, then, Douglas may have had a plausible claim to be a 'Private, U.S. Army,' as his headstone at Arlington reads."

== Legacy and honors ==
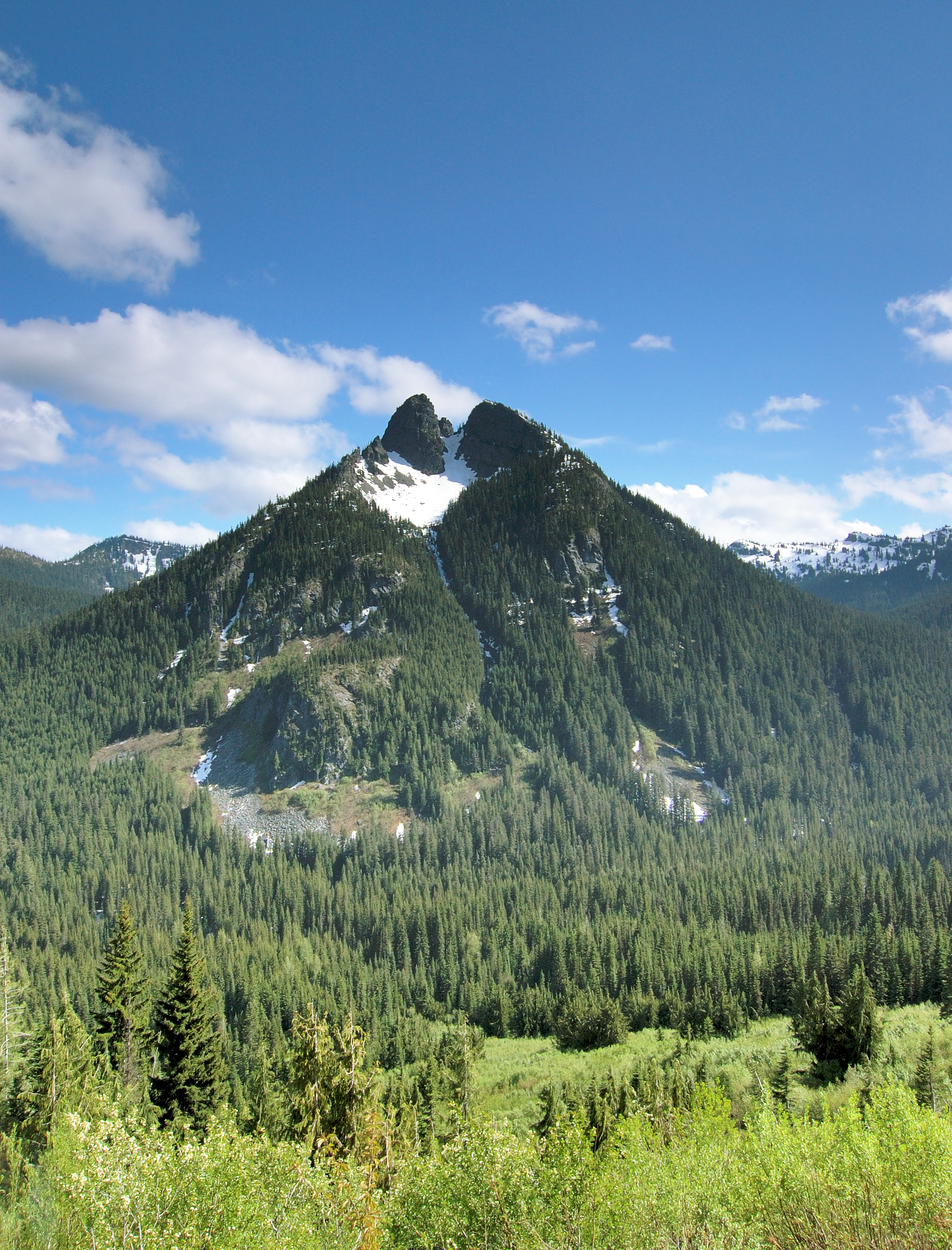
William O. Douglas Wilderness outside Yakima, Washington

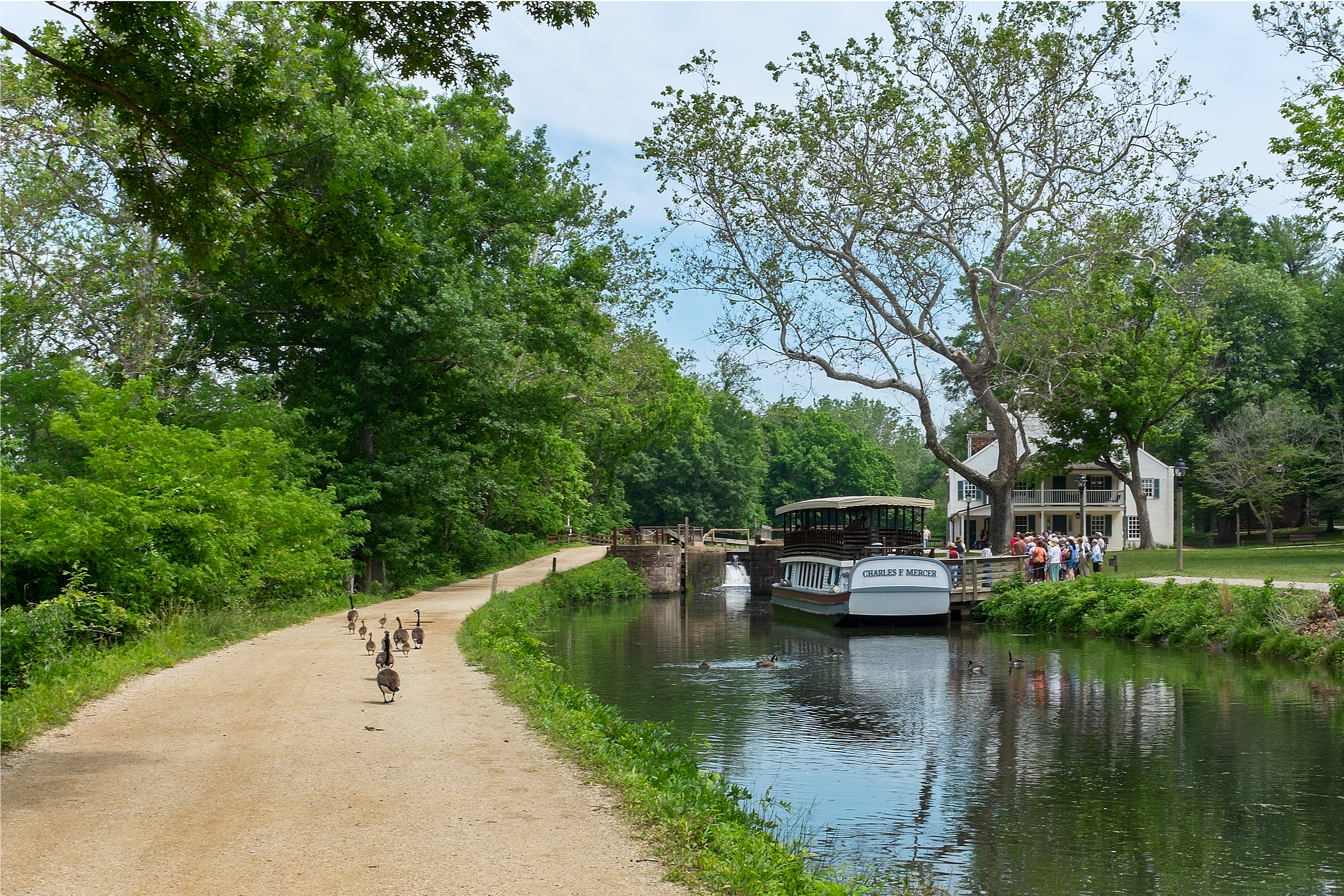
The Chesapeake and Ohio Canal at Lock 20

- In 1962, Douglas was awarded the National Audubon Society's highest honor, the Audubon Medal.
- The 1984 Washington Wilderness Act designated the Cougar Lake Roadless area as the William O. Douglas Wilderness, which adjoins Mount Rainier National Park in Washington State.
- Douglas Falls, in the Appalachian Mountains of North Carolina, is supposedly named for him.
- The William O. Douglas Outdoor Classroom in Beverly Hills, California, is named for him.
- Douglas was elected to the Ecology Hall of Fame for his dedication to conservation.
- The William O. Douglas Honors College at Central Washington University in Ellensburg, Washington, is named for him.
- The William O. Douglas Federal Building, a historic post office, courthouse, and federal office building in Yakima, Washington, which is listed in the National Register of Historic Places, was renamed in his honor in 1978.
- Since 1972, the William O. Douglas Committee, a select group of law students at Gonzaga University School of Law in Spokane, Washington, has sponsored a series of lectures on the First Amendment in Douglas's honor. Douglas was the first speaker for the annual series.
- A statue of Douglas was installed at A.C. Davis High School, in Yakima, Washington. It was dedicated in 1978 to Douglas when the new school was opened.
- William O. Douglas Hall was named in his honor at his alma mater, Whitman College.
- The William O. Douglas Honors College was founded in 1977 in honor of Douglas' spirit of inquiry and activism at Central Washington University.
- Douglas Hall, apartments for continuing students at Earl Warren College, at the University of California, San Diego, is named for him as well.
- In 1975, Time called Douglas "the most doctrinaire and committed civil libertarian ever to sit on the court."
- In 1977, a bust of Douglas was erected along the towpath of the C & O Canal in Georgetown in Washington, D.C., and the C & O Canal National Historical Park was officially dedicated to Douglas in honor of his exhaustive efforts dating from the 1950s in support of preserving the historic canal. In 1998, the Park commemorated the 100th Anniversary of Douglas's birth by unveiling a portrait of Justice Douglas hiking along the towpath by artist Tom Kozar. The portrait, commissioned by the C&O Canal Association, now hangs in the Great Falls Tavern Visitor Center.
- In 1979, Columbia University awarded Douglas an Honorary Doctor of Law degree.
- Douglas Trail, which leads to the Appalachian Trail and Sunfish Pond in New Jersey, is named after him.
- Mountain - The Journey of Justice Douglas is a play written by Douglas Scott which explores the life of William O. Douglas. Produced in 1990 at the Lucille Lortel Theatre in New York, NY.

== Bibliography ==
The papers of William O. Douglas from his career as professor of law, Securities and Exchange commissioner, and associate justice of the United States Supreme Court were bequeathed by him to the Library of Congress.

- Of Men and Mountains, by William O. Douglas, 1950, ISBN 1447400135
- Go East, Young Man: The Early Years; The Autobiography of William O. Douglas ISBN 0-394-71165-3
- The Court Years, 1939 to 1975: The Autobiography of William O. Douglas ISBN 0-394-49240-4
- "Mr. Lincoln & the Negroes: The Long Road to Equality", 1963, Atheneum Press, New York. LCCN 63-17851
- Democracy and finance: The addresses and public statements of William O. Douglas as member and chairman of the Securities and Exchange Commission ISBN 0-8046-0556-4
- Nature's Justice: Writings of William O. Douglas ISBN 0-87071-482-1
- Strange Lands and Friendly People, by William O. Douglas ISBN 1-4067-7204-6
- West of the Indus, by William O. Douglas, 1958, ASIN B0007DMD1O
- Beyond the High Himalayas, by William O. Douglas, 1952 ISBN 112112979X
- North From Malaya, by William O. Douglas ASIN B000UCP8IW
- Points of Rebellion, by William O. Douglas ISBN 0-394-44068-4
- An Interview with William O. Douglas by William O. Douglas (sound recording) ASIN B000S592XI
- An Interview with William O. Douglas, Folkway Records FW 07350
- The Mike Wallace Interview, with Mike Wallace May 11, 1958 (video and transcript)

Douglas was also a contributor to Playboy magazine:

- "The Attack on [the right to] Privacy" (December 1967)
- "[An Inquest] On Our Lakes and Rivers" (June 1968)
- "Civil liberties: The Crucial Issue" (January 1969)
- "The Public be Damned" (July 1969)
- "Points of Rebellion" (October 1970)

== See also ==
- List of justices of the Supreme Court of the United States
- List of law clerks for the fourth seat of the Supreme Court of the United States
- List of United States Supreme Court justices by time in office
- List of United States federal judges by longevity of service
- United States Supreme Court cases during the Burger Court
- United States Supreme Court cases during the Hughes Court
- United States Supreme Court cases during the Stone Court
- United States Supreme Court cases during the Vinson Court
- United States Supreme Court cases during the Warren Court
- William O. Douglas Prize

== Notes ==
Political offices
Preceded by James Landis	Chair of the Securities and Exchange Commission; 1937–1939	Succeeded by Jerome Frank
Legal offices
Preceded by Louis Brandeis	Associate Justice of the Supreme Court of the United States; 1939–1975	Succeeded by John Paul Stevens
