= Sierra Club v. Morton =

- Supreme Court of the United States

Argued November 17, 1971 Decided April 19, 1972
- Full case name: Sierra Club v. Rogers Clark Ballard Morton, Secretary of the Interior, et al.
- Citations: 405 U.S. 727 (more) 92 S. Ct. 1361, 31 L. Ed. 2d 636

Case history
- Prior: Sierra Club v. Hickel, 433 F.2d 24 (9th Cir. 1970).
- Subsequent: Sierra Club v. Morton, 348 F. Supp. 219, (N.D. Cal. 1972)

Holding
- A person has standing to seek judicial review under the Administrative Procedure Act only if he can show that he himself has suffered or will suffer injury, whether economic or otherwise. In this case, where petitioner asserted no individualized harm to itself or its members, it lacked standing to maintain the action.

Court membership
- Chief Justice Warren E. Burger Associate Justices William O. Douglas · William J. Brennan Jr. Potter Stewart · Byron White; Thurgood Marshall · Harry Blackmun; Lewis F. Powell Jr. · William Rehnquist

Case opinions
- Majority: Stewart, joined by Burger, White, Marshall
- Dissent: Douglas
- Dissent: Brennan
- Dissent: Blackmun
- Powell and Rehnquist took no part in the consideration or decision of the case.

Laws applied
- Administrative Procedure Act

Sierra Club v. Morton, 405 U.S. 727 (1972), is a Supreme Court of the United States case on the issue of standing under the Administrative Procedure Act. The Court rejected a lawsuit by the Sierra Club seeking to block the development of a ski resort at Mineral King valley in the Sierra Nevada Mountains because the club had not alleged any injury.

The case prompted a famous dissent by Justice William O. Douglas suggesting that in response to ecological concerns, environmental objects (such as a valley, an alpine meadow, a river, or a lake) should be granted legal personhood by the public.

== Background ==
Mineral King is a seven mile by one mile subalpine glacial valley in Sequoia National Forest then abutting Sequoia National Park in Tulare County, California and only accessible by a dirt county road. In 1965 the United States Forest Service began circulating a prospectus calling for bids for recreational developments at Mineral King. In 1969 the Forest Service accepted a bid by The Walt Disney Company proposing a $35 million ski resort accommodating 1.7 million annual visitors and at any one time 20,000 skiers. By comparison, Disneyland had cost $17 million. The resort would require construction of a new twenty mile highway and 66,000 volt power line through Sequoia National Park, then a nine-story parking structure and a cog-assisted railroad to ultimately take visitors into the valley. Walt Disney began personally buying private property around Mineral King through Retlaw Enterprises and, after contributing heavily in the California gubernatorial election, 1966, received a personal promise from Ronald Reagan that the state would fund the highway.

Skeptical economists doubted the project would yield a positive net present value. Disney's master plan attracted national media attention from Harper's Magazine as well as consistent, critical coverage by The New York Times.

Michael McCloskey had just ousted David Brower as executive director of the Sierra Club and, emboldened by the Second Circuit's decision in Scenic Hudson Preservation Conference v. Federal Power Commission, he sought a more direct, and litigious, approach to environmentalism by setting up the Sierra Club Legal Defense Fund, later renamed Earthjustice. The Sierra Club then sued the United States Secretary of the Interior in San Francisco federal court to block development of Disney's famous ski resort. Asserting itself as private attorney general, the Sierra Club argued that Disney's resort would cause "irreparable harm to the public interest". The Sierra Club did not allege it suffered a unique, private injury from Disney's ski resort because it believed the court would then weigh the balance of hardships in Disney's favor. After two days of hearings, on July 23, 1969, District Judge William Thomas Sweigert issued a preliminary injunction blocking Disney's ski resort.

The Secretary appealed to the United States Court of Appeals for the Ninth Circuit. On September 16, 1970, Judge Ozell Miller Trask, joined by Judge John Kilkenny, vacated judgment and remanded, finding that the Club did not have standing to sue because it had made no allegation that it would be affected by Disney's ski resort. Discussing the merits, Judge Trask felt it was within the Secretary's discretion "to make available a vast area of incomparable beauty to more people rather than to have it remain inaccessible except to a rugged few." Judge Frederick George Hamley concurred, noting that although he thought the Sierra Club had standing to sue, he agreed on the merits that Judge Sweigert's injunction had been an abuse of discretion.

The Sierra Club's petition for certiorari was granted and the case was argued before the U.S. Supreme Court on November 17, 1971, with U.S. Solicitor General Erwin Griswold personally appearing. Tulare County filed amici briefs in the Court of Appeals and the Supreme Court supporting the Secretary. Lewis F. Powell, Jr. and Associate Attorney General William Rehnquist, who both joined the Court on January 7, 1972, did not participate in the case.

== Opinion of the Court ==
On April 19, 1972, the Supreme Court affirmed 4–3. Writing for the Court, Justice Potter Stewart, joined by Justices Byron White, Thurgood Marshall, and Chief Justice Warren E. Burger, agreed with the Ninth Circuit that the Sierra Club had not alleged any legal interest in the case. Because the Constitution's Case or Controversy Clause prohibits advisory opinions, the Court reasons that the legal wrongs protected by the Administrative Procedure Act must at minimum meet the prevailing constitutional requirements of standing. The Sierra Club's legal interest in the case, according to the Court, seemed to be relying on a "zone of interests" test that Justice Douglas had announced in two cases decided on March 3, 1970. Declining to clarify the meaning of "zone of interests", the Court reasoned that broadening the categories of injury is different "from abandoning the requirement" that plaintiffs themselves actually be injured. The Sierra Club had no standing to sue because it did not allege it was itself in any way injured by Disney's ski resort.

In a footnote, the Court helpfully notes that the Wilderness Society's amici brief included assertions that the Sierra Club makes regular camping trips to Mineral King and that Rule 15 of the Federal Rules of Civil Procedure, "of course", allows the Sierra Club to amend its complaint. Justice Stewart closes by noting that although Alexis de Tocqueville had observed "Scarcely any political question arises in the United States that is not resolved sooner or later, into a judicial question", that Tocqueville further commented that "by intimately uniting the trial of the law with the trial of an individual, legislation is protected from wanton assaults and from the daily aggressions of party spirit."

== Justice Douglas's dissent ==
Sierra Club v. Morton is, perhaps, best known for the dissenting opinion by William O. Douglas who asserted that natural resources ought to have standing to sue for their own protection. An excerpt from his dissent:

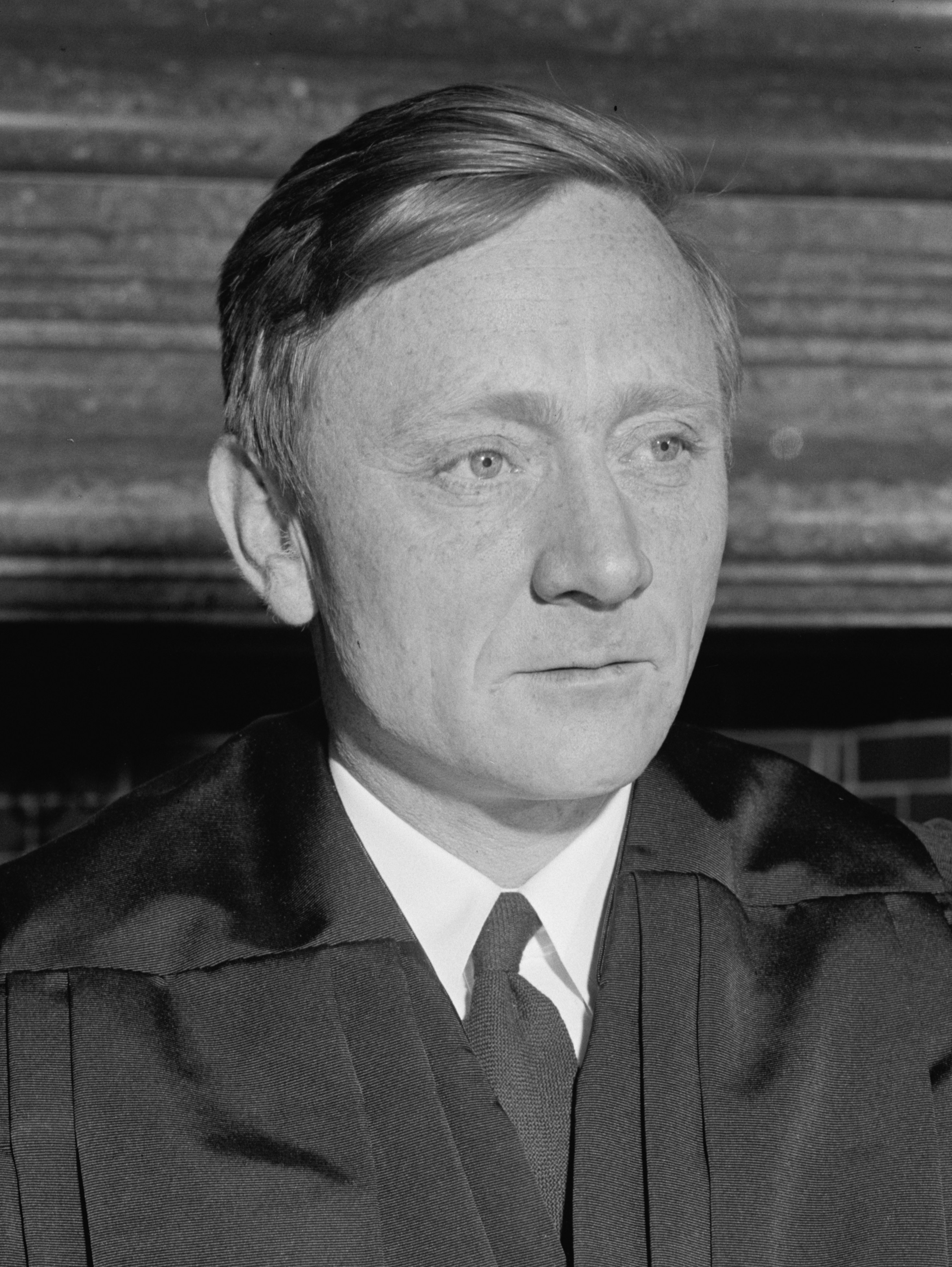
Justice "Wild Bill" Douglas

The critical question of "standing" would be simplified and also put neatly in focus if we fashioned a federal rule that allowed environmental issues to be litigated before federal agencies or federal courts in the name of the inanimate object about to be despoiled, defaced, or invaded by roads and bulldozers and where injury is the subject of public outrage. Contemporary public concern for protecting nature's ecological equilibrium should lead to the conferral of standing upon environmental objects to sue for their own preservation. This suit would therefore be more properly labeled as Mineral King v. Morton.

Inanimate objects are sometimes parties in litigation. A ship has a legal personality, a fiction found useful for maritime purposes. The corporation sole—a creature of ecclesiastical law—is an acceptable adversary and large fortunes ride on its cases. The ordinary corporation is a "person" for purposes of the adjudicatory processes, whether it represents proprietary, spiritual, aesthetic, or charitable causes.

So it should be as respects valleys, alpine meadows, rivers, lakes, estuaries, beaches, ridges, groves of trees, swampland, or even air that feels the destructive pressures of modern technology and modern life. The river, for example, is the living symbol of all the life it sustains or nourishes—fish, aquatic insects, water ouzels, otter, fisher, deer, elk, bear, and all other animals, including man, who are dependent on it or who enjoy it for its sight, its sound, or its life. The river as plaintiff speaks for the ecological unit of life that is part of it. Those people who have a meaningful relation to that body of water—whether it be a fisherman, a canoeist, a zoologist, or a logger—must be able to speak for the values which the river represents and which are threatened with destruction....

The voice of the inanimate object, therefore, should not be stilled. That does not mean that the judiciary takes over the managerial functions from the federal agency. It merely means that before these priceless bits of America (such as a valley, an alpine meadow, a river, or a lake) are forever lost or are so transformed as to be reduced to the eventual rubble of our urban environment, the voice of the existing beneficiaries of these environmental wonders should be heard.

Perhaps they will not win. Perhaps the bulldozers of "progress" will plow under all the aesthetic wonders of this beautiful land. That is not the present question. The sole question is, who has standing to be heard?

Those who hike the Appalachian Trail into Sunfish Pond, New Jersey, and camp or sleep there, or run the Allagash in Maine, or climb the Guadalupes in West Texas, or who canoe and portage the Quetico Superior in Minnesota, certainly should have standing to defend those natural wonders before courts or agencies, though they live 3,000 miles away. Those who merely are caught up in environmental news or propaganda and flock to defend these waters or areas may be treated differently. That is why these environmental issues should be tendered by the inanimate object itself. Then there will be assurances that all of the forms of life which it represents will stand before the court—the pileated woodpecker as well as the coyote and bear, the lemmings as well as the trout in the streams. Those inarticulate members of the ecological group cannot speak. But those people who have so frequented the place as to know its values and wonders will be able to speak for the entire ecological community...

That, as I see it, is the issue of "standing" in the present case and controversy.

Justice Douglas's dissent included his concern that regulatory agencies become too favorable with their regulated industries (regulatory capture):

Yet the pressures on agencies for favorable action one way or the other are enormous. The suggestion that Congress can stop action which is undesirable is true in theory; yet even Congress is too remote to give meaningful direction and its machinery is too ponderous to use very often. The federal agencies of which I speak are not venal or corrupt. But they are notoriously under the control of powerful interests who manipulate them through advisory committees, or friendly working relations, or who have that natural affinity with the agency which in time develops between the regulator and the regulated. As early as 1894, Attorney General Olney predicted that regulatory agencies might become "industry-minded", as illustrated by his forecast concerning the Interstate Commerce Commission:

The Commission ... is, or can be made, of great use to the railroads. It satisfies the popular clamor for a government supervision of railroads, at the same time that that supervision is almost entirely nominal. Further, the older such a commission gets to be, the more inclined it will be found to take the business and railroad view of things.

— M. Josephson, The Politicos 526 (1938).

Years later a court of appeals observed, "the recurring question which has plagued public regulation of industry [is] whether the regulatory agency is unduly oriented toward the interests of the industry it is designed to regulate, rather than the public interest it is designed to protect."

— Moss v. CAB, 139 U.S. App. D.C. 150, 152, 430 F. 2d 891, 893.

== Subsequent developments ==
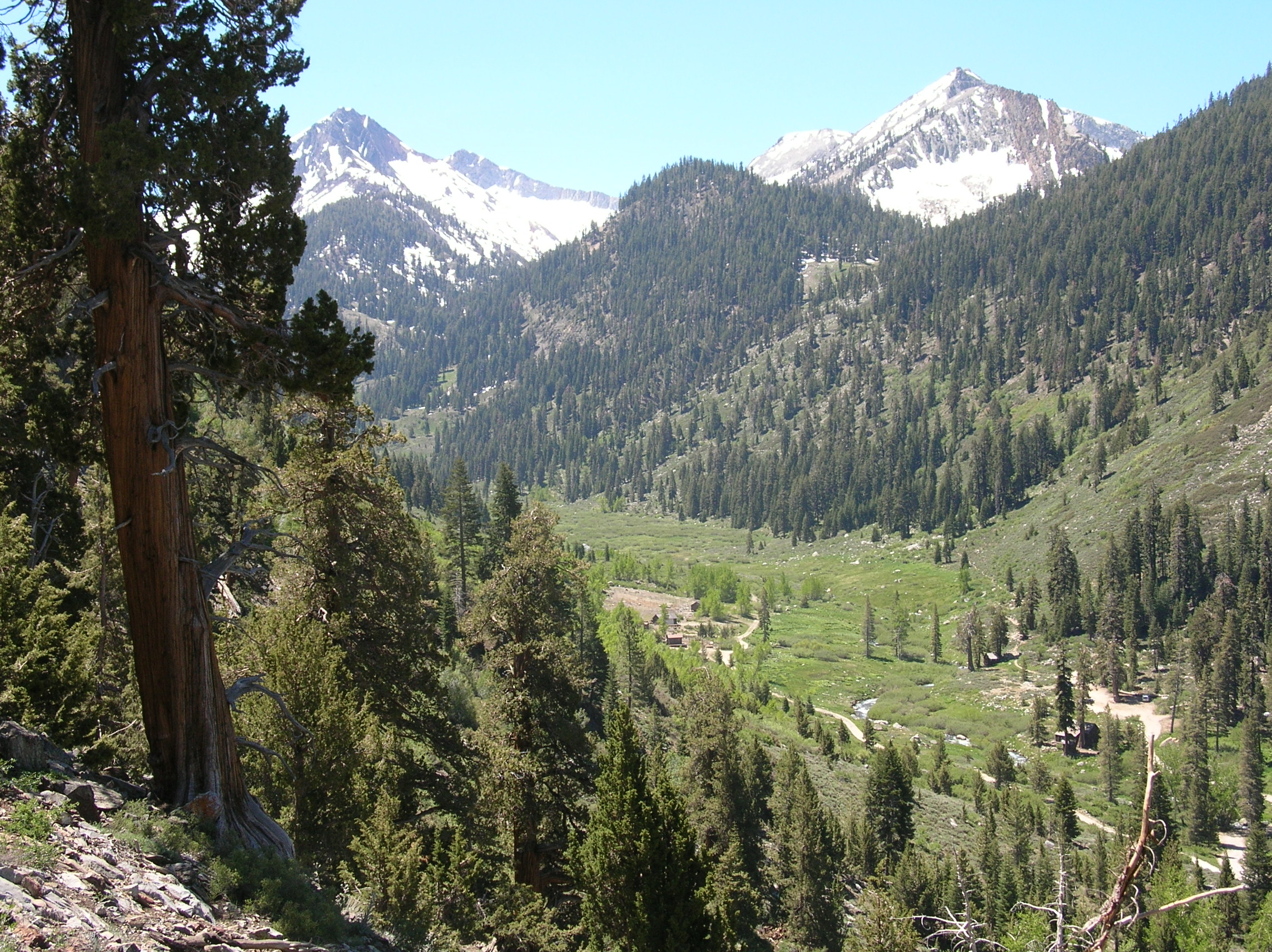
Mineral King in 2004

On June 23, 1972, the Sierra Club amended its complaint to allege that club outings in the valley would be harmed by a massive ski resort, added several natural persons as plaintiffs, and added a new claim for relief under the National Environmental Policy Act. On September 12, Judge Sweigert then allowed the case to proceed to discovery. In August 1972 Governor Reagan withdrew his support of the project, now arguing the new highway would be too expensive.

The Forest Service received 2,150 comments in response to its June 1974 preliminary draft Environmental Impact Statement. On February 26, 1976, the Forest Service released its final EIS for a resort accommodating 8,000 skiers. The Sierra Club stopped pursuing its lawsuit and in 1977 Judge Sweigert threw out the case for lack of prosecution.

Although the Sierra Club lost the case, as a practical matter they won the war. To assert standing in a natural resource manner, environmental groups simply need to find among their membership a single person with a particularized interest (e.g., one who hikes, hunts, fishes, or camps in or near the affected area). Mineral King was ultimately never developed and was absorbed into Sequoia National Park.

During the 95th United States Congress, Congressman John Hans Krebs attached a measure adding Mineral King to Sequoia National Park to a large omnibus "Park Barrel Bill", which President Jimmy Carter then signed into law in 1978. Thirty years later during the 111th United States Congress, Senator Barbara Boxer developed a bill designating Mineral King as the John Krebs Wilderness, which President Barack Obama then signed into law in the Omnibus Public Land Management Act of 2009.

== See also ==
- Scenic Hudson Preservation Conference v. Federal Power Commission
