= List of islands on the Potomac River =

This is a list of islands on the Potomac River and its North and South branches. Because the Potomac belongs to Maryland, the majority of its islands lie within that state with some exceptions including portions located in the District of Columbia.

== Potomac River ==
Name	Order downstream	State	Location
unnamed island	1	Maryland	?
Okonoko Island	2	Maryland	?
unnamed islands	3	Maryland	?
unnamed island	4	Maryland	?
unnamed island	5	Maryland	?
unnamed island	6	Maryland	?
unnamed island	7	Maryland	?
Hancock Island	8	Maryland	?
unnamed island	9	Maryland	?
Sleepy Creek Islands	10	Maryland	?
unnamed island	11	Maryland	?
unnamed island	12	Maryland	?
Back Creek Island	13	Maryland	?
unnamed island	14	Maryland	?
unnamed island	15	Maryland	?
Duck Island	16	Maryland	Washington County at Marlowe, West Virginia
unnamed island	17	Maryland	?
Shepherds Island	18	Maryland	Washington County at Marlowe, West Virginia
Knott Island	19	Maryland	Washington County near Antietam
Byrnes Island	20	Maryland	Washington County at Harper's Ferry, West Virginia
unnamed island	21	Maryland	?
Colonial Island	22	Maryland	Frederick County at Knoxville
Catoctin Creek Island	23	Maryland	?
unnamed island	24	Maryland	?
Paton Island	25	Maryland	Frederick County at Point of Rocks
unnamed island	26	Maryland	?
Heaters Island	27	Maryland	Frederick County at Point of Rocks
Mason Island	28	Maryland	Frederick County
Nolands Island	29	Maryland	Frederick County
Meadow Island	30	Maryland	Frederick County
Birdsaw Island	31	Maryland	Frederick County
Cox Island	32	Maryland	Frederick County
Mason Island	33	Maryland	Montgomery County
Harrison Island	34	Maryland	Montgomery County near River Creek, Virginia
Selden Island	35	Maryland	Montgomery County near Leesburg, Virginia
Van Deventer Island	36	Maryland	Montgomery County near Leesburg, Virginia
Tenfoot Island	37	Maryland	Montgomery County near Leesburg, Virginia
Sharpshin Island	38	Maryland	Montgomery County near Sterling, Virginia
Lowes Island	39	Virginia	Loudoun County near Sterling
Pond Island	40	Maryland	Montgomery County near Blockhouse Point
Patowmack Island	41	Virginia	Fairfax County in Seneca Regional Park
Elm Island	42	Maryland	Montgomery County near Blockhouse Point
Grapevine Island	43	Maryland	Montgomery County near Blockhouse Point
Katie Island	44	Maryland	Montgomery County near Blockhouse Point
Torpedo Island	44	Maryland	Montgomery County near Pennyfield Lock
Watkins Island	45	Maryland	Montgomery County
Sycamore Island	46	Maryland	Montgomery County
Clagett Island	47	Maryland	Montgomery County near Great Falls, Virginia
Gladys Island	48	Maryland	Montgomery County
Minnehaha Island	49	Maryland	Montgomery County
Bealls Island	50	Maryland	Montgomery County
Powhatan Island	51	Maryland	Montgomery County near Great Falls, Virginia
Conn Island	52	Maryland	Montgomery County near Great Falls of the Potomac River
Olmsted Island (formerly Great Falls Island)	53	Maryland	Montgomery County at Great Falls of the Potomac River
Rocky Islands	54	Maryland	Montgomery County in Great Falls Park
Bear Island	55	Maryland	Montgomery County at Great Falls Park
Sherwin Island (formerly Cupid's Bower Island)	56	Maryland	Montgomery County at Great Falls Park
Offutt Island	57	Maryland	Montgomery County
Hermit Island	58	Maryland	Montgomery County in the Chesapeake and Ohio Canal National Historical Park
Perry Island	59	Maryland	Montgomery County
Herzog Island	60	Maryland	Montgomery County in the Chesapeake and Ohio Canal National Historical Park
Turkey Island (Maryland)	61	Maryland	Montgomery County at the Yellow Falls
Vaso Island	62	Maryland	Montgomery County in the Chesapeake and Ohio Canal National Historical Park
Plummers Island	63	Maryland	Montgomery County near Cabin John
Dots Island	64	Maryland	Montgomery County near Cabin John
Swainson Island	65	Maryland	Montgomery County near Cabin John
Wades Island	66	Maryland	Montgomery County near Cabin John
Langley Island	67	Maryland	Montgomery County near Cabin John
Minnie Island (Maryland)	68	Maryland	Montgomery County near Cabin John
Cedar Island	69	Maryland	Montgomery County at Glen Echo
Cabin John Island	70	Maryland	Montgomery County at Glen Echo
Chatauqua Island	71	Maryland	Montgomery County at Glen Echo
Ruppert Island	72	Maryland	Montgomery County at Glen Echo
Sycamore Island	73	Maryland	Montgomery County
Snake Island	74	Maryland	Montgomery County at Little Falls Dam
High Island	75	Maryland	Montgomery County at Brookmont
Three Sisters	76	District of Columbia	District of Columbia
Theodore Roosevelt Island	77	District of Columbia	District of Columbia
Little Island	78	District of Columbia	District of Columbia
Columbia Island	79	District of Columbia	District of Columbia
Daingerfield Island	80	Virginia	Alexandria, Virginia
Goose Island	81	District of Columbia	District of Columbia at the mouth of Oxon Creek
Rosilie Island	82	Maryland	Prince George's County at the Woodrow Wilson Memorial Bridge
Hog Island	83	Virginia	Fairfax County, Virginia at Wellington Heights
Chopawamsic Island	84	Virginia	Prince William County at Quantico
Cobb Island	85	Maryland	Charles County
Saint Margaret Island (Maryland)	86	Maryland	St. Mary's County
Bullock Island	87	Maryland	St. Mary's County in St. Catherine Sound
Saint Catherine Island	88	Maryland	St. Mary's County at St. Catherine Sound
Saint Clement's Island	89	Maryland	St. Mary's County
Saint George Island	90	Maryland	St. Mary's County
Craney Island	?	Maryland	Charles County
Harris Island	?	Maryland	Montgomery County
Lock Island	?	Maryland	Montgomery County in the Chesapeake and Ohio Canal National Historical Park

== North Branch Potomac River ==
Name	Order downstream	State	Location
Longs Island	1	Maryland	?

== South Branch Potomac River ==
Name	Order downstream	State	Location
unnamed island	1	?	?
unnamed island	2	?	?
unnamed islands	3	?	?
Piss Pot Island	4	West Virginia	?
Valley View Island	5	West Virginia	?
unnamed island	6	?	?
unnamed island	7	?	?
unnamed island	8	?	?
unnamed island	9	?	?

== See also ==
- List of islands of the United States
- List of islands of Maryland
