= Mather Gorge =

Gorge of the Potomac River southeast and downriver of Great Falls

Coordinates: 38.988102°N 77.246418°W

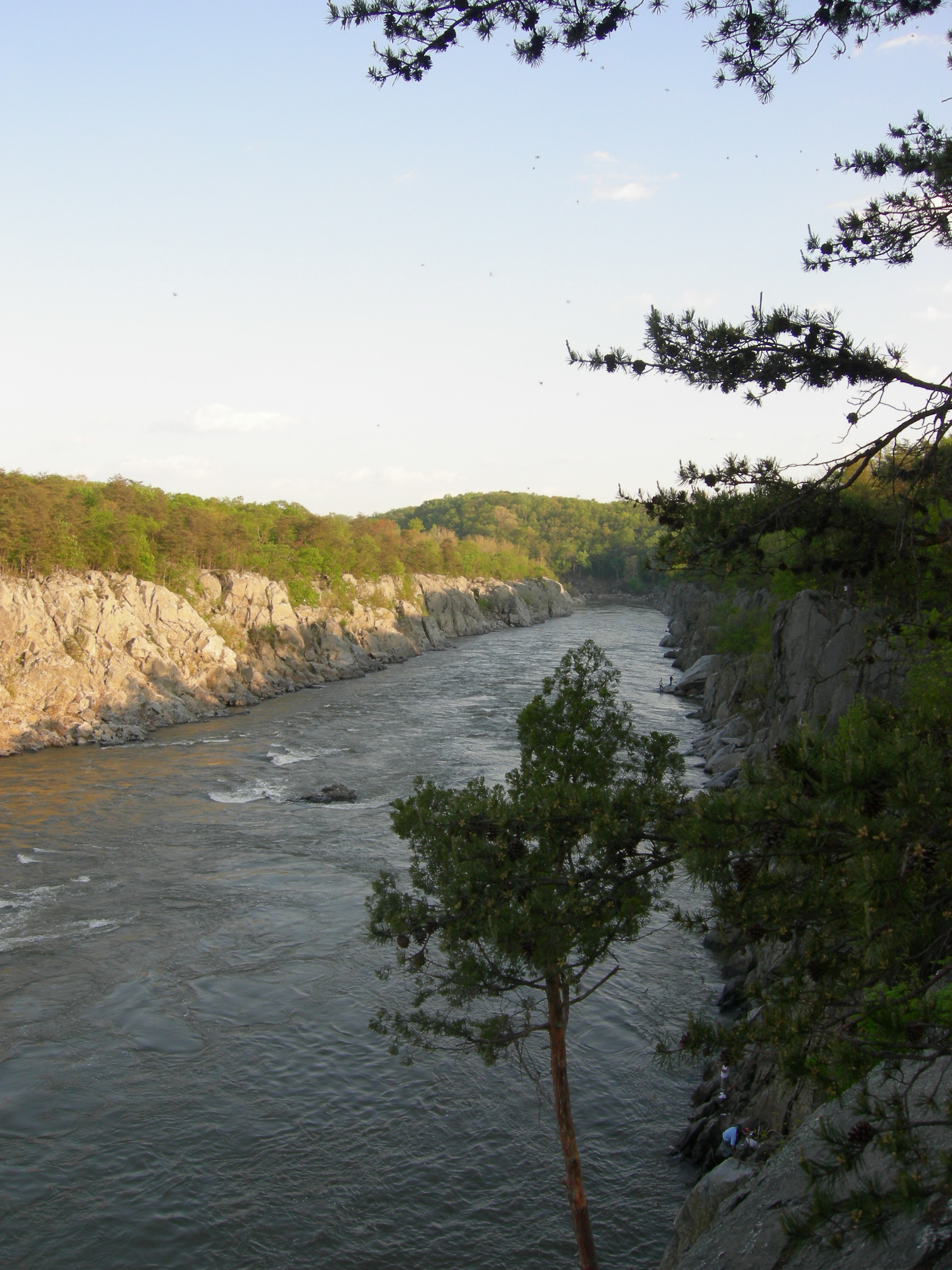
Mather Gorge seen from Northern Virginia; the Potomac River lies fully within Maryland.

Mather Gorge is a river gorge south and just downriver of Great Falls in the state of Maryland bordering Virginia. The Maryland land side of the gorge is Bear Island, part of the Chesapeake and Ohio Canal National Historical Park, and the Virginia side is part of Great Falls Park. Both parks are National Park Service sites. The gorge is named after Stephen Mather, the first director of the National Park Service.

The gorge is cut by the Potomac River and is, for the most part, lined on both sides by cliffs. Towards the southern end of the gorge, the cliffs become tree-lined bluffs as the gorge widens out into the wider and larger Potomac Gorge. At Little Falls, the Potomac River crosses the Fall Line as it leaves the Appalachian Piedmont and enters the Atlantic Coastal Plain.

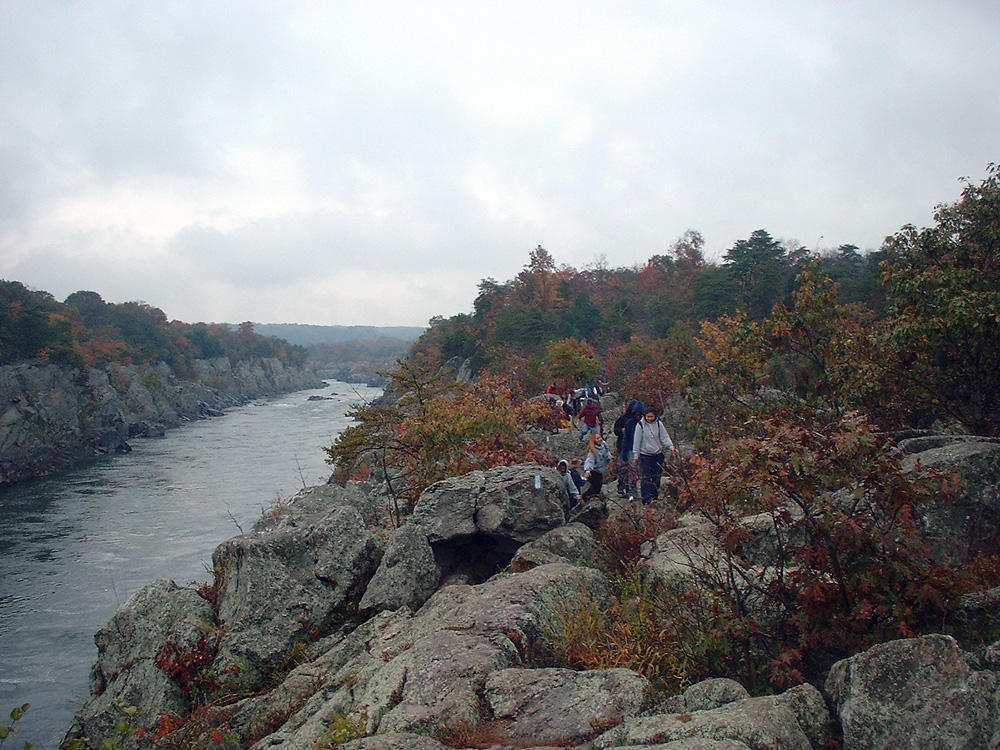
Students scrambling over boulders on the Billy Goat Trail with Mather Gorge on the left

Hiking is a common activity with many trails along and near the gorge. On the Maryland side, in the C&O Canal National Historical Park, Section A of the Billy Goat Trail follows the gorge—from below Great Falls to above the Anglers Inn river put-in. The River Trail in Great Falls Park follows the gorge on the Virginia side. It is also a popular rock climbing attraction as the cliff heights and terrain lend themselves well to top rope climbing. Generally, most of the rock climbing occurs on the vertical cliffs of the Virginia side of the gorge, below the Observation Decks and above the 90 degree river bend.

Whitewater kayaking and canoeing is also very popular within the gorge. From Great Falls to the Difficult Run Rapids (Maryland Chute, Virginia Chute, and Center Chute), the gorge contains Class I to Class VI whitewater rapids.
