= Frederick Law Olmsted Jr. =

American landscape architect (1870–1957)

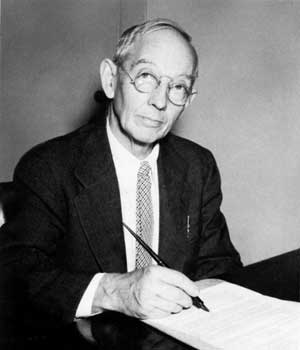
- Born: July 24, 1870; Staten Island, New York, U.S.
- Died: December 25, 1957 (aged 87); Malibu, California, U.S.
- Education: Roxbury Latin School; Harvard University
- Occupation: Architect
- Parent(s): Frederick Law Olmsted; Mary Cleveland Perkins
- Awards: Pugsley Medal (1953)
- Practice: Olmsted Brothers
- Buildings: Biltmore Estate
- Projects: Washington, D.C.: National Mall; Jefferson Memorial; White House grounds; Rock Creek Park. Others: Bok Tower Gardens; Forest Hills Gardens; Leimert Park, Los Angeles, Lake Wales, Florida

Frederick Law Olmsted Jr. (July 24, 1870 – December 25, 1957) was an American landscape architect and city planner known for his wildlife conservation efforts. He had a lifetime commitment to national parks, and worked on projects in Acadia National Park, the Everglades and Yosemite National Park. He gained national recognition by filling in for his father on the Park Improvement Commission for the District of Columbia beginning in 1901, and by contributing to the famous McMillan Commission Plan for redesigning Washington according to a revised version of the original L’Enfant Plan. Olmsted Point in Yosemite and Olmsted Island at Great Falls of the Potomac River in Maryland are named after him.

The son of Frederick Law Olmsted Sr., he and his older half-brother John C. Olmsted created Olmsted Brothers about 1896 as a successor firm to their father's firm. They had both worked with him before his retirement. Soon after his father's death, Olmsted stopped using the suffix "Jr." Works attributed to Frederick Law Olmsted after about 1896 are those of this son.

== Early life and education ==
Olmsted was born in 1870 on Staten Island, New York, the youngest surviving child of three born to Frederick Law Olmsted, a landscape architect and journalist, and Mary Cleveland (née Perkins). Their first son died in infancy. Frederick Jr. had an older sister and three older half-siblings. At birth he was named Henry Perkins Olmsted, but at age seven he was rechristened as Frederick Law Olmsted Jr. He went by "Rick."

His mother had been married before, to Frederick's brother, and widowed after John Olmsted died of tuberculosis. His father married the widowed Mary a couple of years later and adopted their three children. Among them was John Charles Olmsted, born in 1852, and a younger sister and brother.

After graduating from the Roxbury Latin School in 1890, Olmsted began his design career as an apprentice to his noted father. Olmsted worked early on two significant projects: the 1893 World's Columbian Exposition in Chicago, and the largest privately owned home in the United States—the George Vanderbilt estate in North Carolina, known as the Biltmore Estate.

After this apprenticeship, Olmsted entered Harvard College. He earned his bachelor's degree in 1894.

== Career ==
After graduation, Olmsted became a partner in his father's Brookline, Massachusetts landscape architecture firm in 1895. His older half-brother John was already working there. Shortly thereafter, his father retired. Olmsted and John quickly took over leadership of the firm, although Olmsted was the "driving force" in the company. For the next half-century, the Olmsted Brothers firm completed thousands of landscape projects nationwide. In 1900, Olmsted returned to Harvard to teach. He also established the school's first formal training program in landscape architecture.

=== McMillan Commission ===
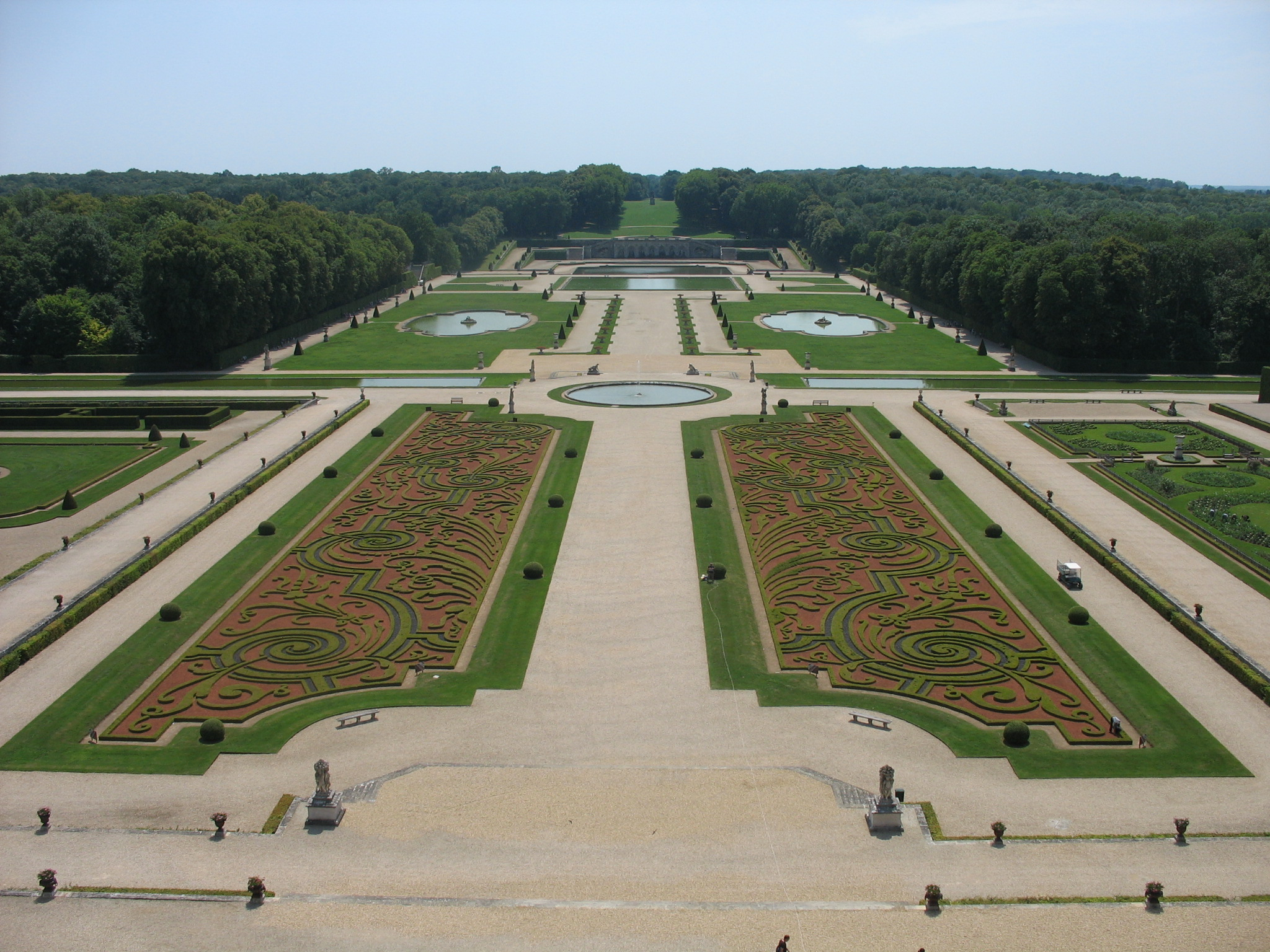
The gardens of Vaux-le-Vicomte served as a backdrop to educating the designers

In 1901, Olmsted was appointed by President Theodore Roosevelt as a member of the Senate Park Improvement Commission for the District of Columbia, commonly known as the McMillan Commission. He joined other notable architects and designers such as Daniel H. Burnham, Charles F. McKim and Augustus Saint-Gaudens, who were charged to "restore and develop the century-old plans of Major L'Enfant for Washington and to fit them to the conditions of today." Olmsted, aged 30, led his colleagues on a tour of Europe in order for them to deepen their understanding of European architecture and landscaping, but how to reshape Washington, D.C. Stops were made in Paris, Rome, Venice, Vienna and Budapest as well as pertinent towns, parks and public gardens, and private estates. Recognizing the age gap between himself and his peers, Olmsted called upon authoritative sources to educate them on the works of Andre Le Notre, parks, and city planning.

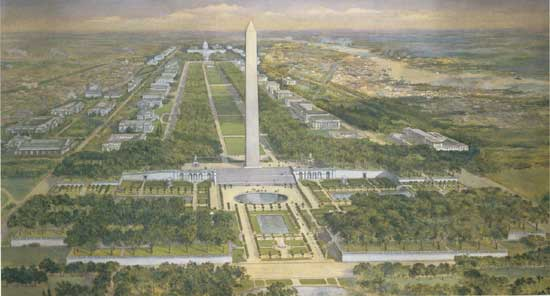
Unbuilt gardens at Washington Monument

With each stop, they immersed themselves in aesthetics and designs that had endured for centuries. This journey wasn’t just about admiration; it was an opportunity to absorb the principles of design, scale, and grandeur. The experience sparked new ideas and offered a tangible blueprint for the monumental transformation they were about to undertake. Following their trip to Europe, an exhibit at the Corcoran Gallery of Art enthralled thousands of visitors on what the capital could look. L'Enfant's original plan made the United States Capitol the center of the city, but the addition of the Lincoln Memorial and Jefferson Memorial, Olmsted shifted the monumental core the from the mall to the Washington Monument. Their resulting McMillan Plan was approved and has guided federal planning in the District through review of projects and designs by the National Capital Planning Commission.

In 1910, he was approached by the American Civic Association for advice on the creation of a new bureau of national parks. This initiated six years of correspondence, including this letter to the president of the Appalachian Mountain Club, dated January 19, 1912:

The present situation in regard to the national parks is very bad. They have been created one at a time by acts of Congress which have not defined at all clearly the purposes for which the lands were to be set apart, nor provided any orderly or efficient means of safeguarding the parks ... I have made at different times two suggestions, one of which was ... a definition of the purposes for which the national parks and monuments are to be administered by the Bureau.

Olmsted recommended the following for the mission, a statement preserved in the National Park Service Organic Act (1916):

To conserve the scenery and the natural and historic objects and the wild life therein and to provide for the enjoyment of the same in such manner and by such means as will leave them unimpaired for the enjoyment of future generations.

Olmsted married Sarah Hall Sharples on March 30, 1911. They had one child together.

Between 1905 and 1915, Olmsted was in demand by planning boards and citizen associations across the country for his expertise in the City Beautiful movement. During that time he developed planning reports for cities such as Detroit, Utica, Boulder, Pittsburgh, New Haven, Rochester, and Newport, as well as designed master plans for Roland Park in Baltimore, Forest Hills Gardens in New York City, and the industrial town of Torrance, CA, which included Old Downtown Torrance and El Prado Park.

By 1920, he had completed well-known projects such as plans for metropolitan park systems and greenways across the country. In 1928, while working for the California State Park Commission (now part of the California Department of Parks and Recreation), Olmsted completed a statewide survey of potential park lands that defined basic long-range goals and provided guidance for the acquisition and development of state parks. In 1930, Olmsted collaborated with Ansel F. Hall, Chief Naturalist of the National Park Service, to prepare the "Report on Proposed Park Reservations for East Bay Cities, California". This report, also known as the Olmsted-Hall Report, played a crucial role in the establishment of the East Bay Regional Park District in 1934. The District, which was the first regional park agency in the United States, was created to implement the recommendations outlined in the report. The Olmsted-Hall Report envisioned a 10,000-acre park system extending nearly 22 miles along the hill ridges of the East Bay, accessible to the metropolitan cities below. This visionary plan laid the foundation for what would become a vast 126.000-acre network of parks and open spaces in the East Bay area.

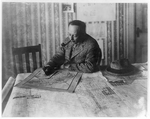
Frederick Law Olmsted Jr. at his drafting table

Under the leadership of John Charles Olmsted and Frederick Law Olmsted Jr., the Olmsted Brothers firm employed nearly 60 staff at its peak in the early 1930s. As the last surviving family member in the firm, Olmsted retired in 1949.

Olmsted completed many important design projects in the nation's capital: the National Mall, Jefferson Memorial, White House grounds, and Rock Creek Park. These are now managed by the National Park Service. Olmsted also prepared the plan for Boston's metropolitan park system, including the Fenway; and a master plan for Cornell University in upstate New York. It featured a terrace-style 'master plan' layout, from which was constructed the large Arts Quad and Libe Slope. He took part in designing two early planned suburban communities: Forest Hills Gardens, Queens, in New York as well as parts of Mayfield and Roland Park in Baltimore, Maryland. In addition, he worked on the Bok Tower Gardens in Lake Wales, Florida.

Olmsted also worked internationally. His design for the Caracas Country Club (mid 1920s) in Venezuela drew from the natural scenery of the area. In the early 21st century, the Caracas Country Club is the only place in the city where it is possible to have a sense of the valley's original natural landscape. In the 1920s, he was asked to adapt the lands associated with the former haciendas Blandín, Lecuna, El Samán and La Granja into a residential golf club; Olmsted created a sensitive urban design and landscaping project.

=== Professional and civic activities ===
A founding member and later president of the American Society of Landscape Architects, Olmsted was active in numerous other planning and design organizations and commissions, including the U.S. Commission of Fine Arts, the National Capital Park and Planning Commission, the Baltimore Park Commission, the National Park Service Board of Advisers for Yosemite, the National Conference on City Planning, the American City Planning Institute, the National Institute of Arts and Letters, and the American Academy in Rome.

== Legacy and honors ==
Olmsted received many awards and honors during his long career, among them the American Academy Gold Medal (1949) and the U.S. Department of the Interior Conservation Award (1956).

In his later years, Olmsted worked to protect California's coastal redwoods. Redwood National Park's Olmsted Grove was dedicated to him in 1953, the same year in which he received the Pugsley Gold Medal.

Olmsted died while visiting friends in Malibu, California. He was survived by a daughter and is buried at Old North Cemetery in Hartford, Connecticut.

== Projects ==
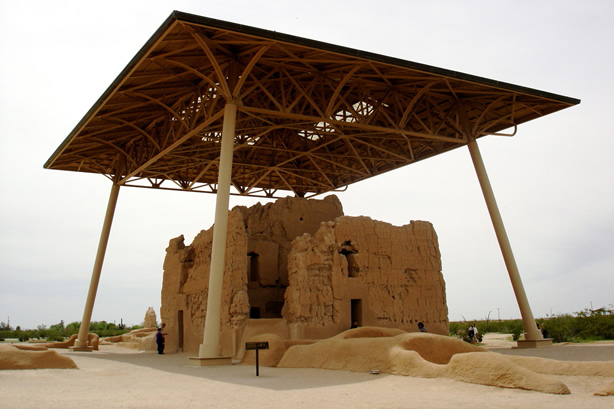
Olmsted-designed shelter at Casa Grande Ruins National Monument

- Smith-McDowell House, Asheville, North Carolina
- Old Downtown Torrance, c. 1912
- Landscape design at Waveny Park, New Canaan, Connecticut, 1912.
- Shelter at Casa Grande Ruins National Monument, 1932
- St. Francis Wood residential neighborhood located in southwestern San Francisco, California, c. 1914
- Fort Tryon Park, New York City, 1917–1935
- Caracas Country Club, Caracas, Venezuela, mid-1920s
- Palos Verdes Estates, Los Angeles County, California, mid-1930s
- Governor Francis Farms neighborhood founded in 1838 in Warwick, Rhode Island. He designed many of the homes in that neighborhood in 1949.
