= William O. Douglas Award =

William O. Douglas Award could refer to:

- William O. Douglas Award (WACDL) given by the Washington Association of Criminal Defense Lawyers
- William O. Douglas Award (ASECA) given by the Association of Securities and Exchange Commission Alumni
- William O. Douglas Award (C&OCA) given by the C&O Canal Association
- William O. Douglas Award (Sierra) given by the Sierra Club

== See also ==
- William O. Douglas Prize given by the Commission on Freedom of Expression
