= Olmsted Island =

Island in the Potomac River, US

Coordinates: 38.9983°N 77.2500°W

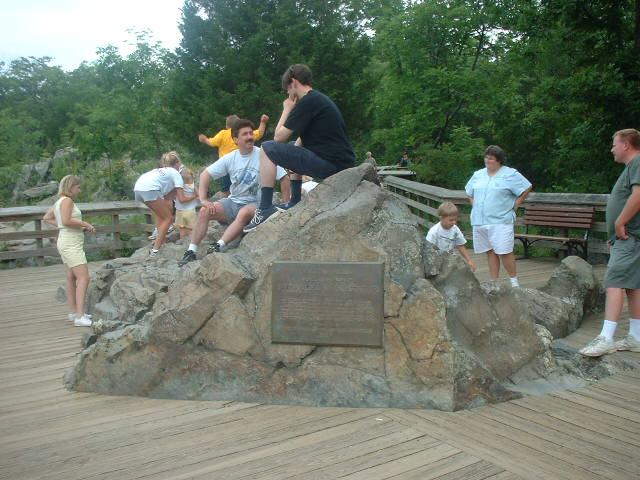
Image 1: A scenic overlook is built into a rock on Olmsted Island

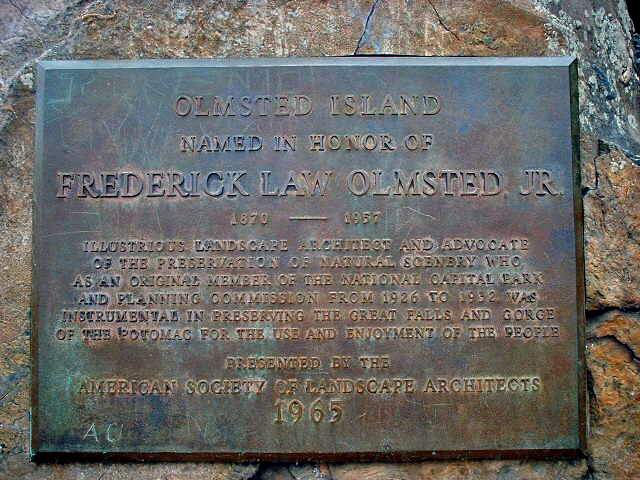
Image 2: Close up of the plaque in Image 1

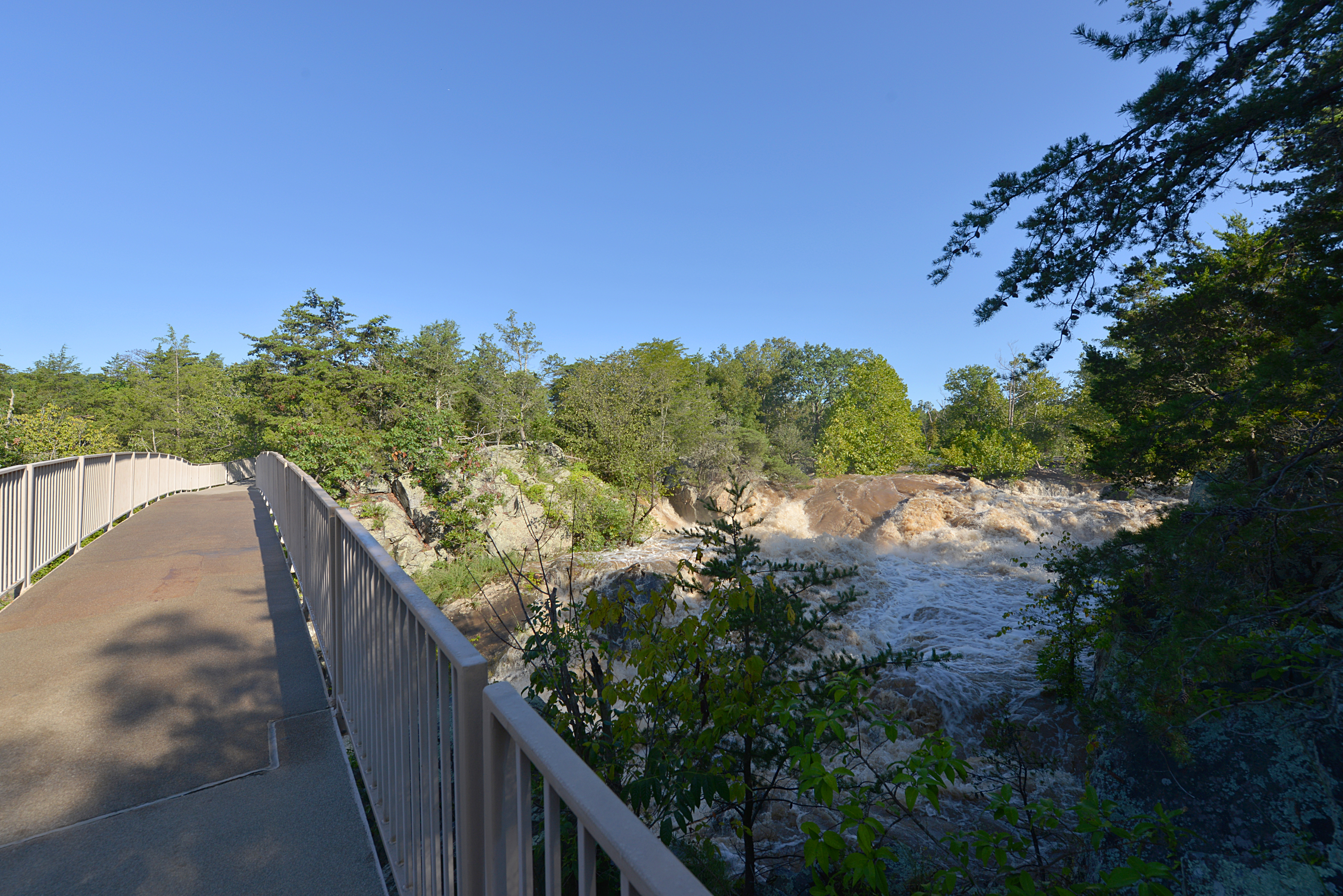
Water going under a bridge on Olmsted Island during a period of unusually high water

The view from the tourist walkway on Olmsted Island overlooking the Great Falls of the Potomac River.

Olmsted Island is a small island in the middle of the Potomac River in the U.S. state of Maryland, near Great Falls which is a part of C & O Canal National Historical Park, located across the river from Great Falls Park. It is a part of Potomac, Maryland.

Named for Frederick Law Olmsted Jr., the landscape architect and preservationist whose famous father designed New York's Central Park, the small island is a bedrock terrace forest that supports rare, threatened and endangered plant species.

The island is very rocky and has steep cliffs that face the river, where it has been eroded over time. It also has trees and vegetation. One might also spy a heron, small lizard or wild goose here. The total area of the island (estimating from calibrated satellite footage) is no more than 0.2 square kilometers. A fenced-in wooden tourist walkway winds along the southern part of the island. For the purpose of protecting the island's natural wildlife, visitors are not allowed to leave the tourist walkway. The tourist walkway eventually ends in a scenic overlook platform (see images 1 and 2) that has a beautiful view of the Great Falls of the Potomac River.

"Hurricane Agnes washed away all the woody shrubs and trees in 1972," says R. Harrison Wiegand, a regional ecologist for the Wildlife and Heritage Service of the Maryland Department of Natural Resources. "The next big flood will wash them away again. The floods constantly change things. You may see a rare species in one area, then the floods will come through and wash it out. Some other plants will grow there instead. This is one of the most biologically diverse habitats within the whole national park system."

The trail leading to Olmsted Island is handicapped accessible and has wheelchair ramps, but dogs are not permitted.
