= Sharpshin Island =

Island on the Potomac River in Montgomery County, Maryland, US

Coordinates: 39°3′53.39″N 77°22′14.95″W

Location of Sharpshin Island, Maryland

Sharpshin Island is an island on the Potomac River in Montgomery County, Maryland, near Algonkian Regional Park. It is 5.3 acres (2.1 ha) in area, but is very narrow, measuring only 50 ft (15 m) across at its broadest point. Because of its plentiful shoreline, it provides habitat for waterfowl, molluscs, crustaceans, amphibians, and reptiles. A land patent for the island for "Harry D. Johnson et al." in 1903.

== See also ==
- List of islands of Maryland
- List of islands on the Potomac River
