= Great Falls Park =

National Park Service unit in Virginia, United States

- IUCN category V (protected landscape/seascape)
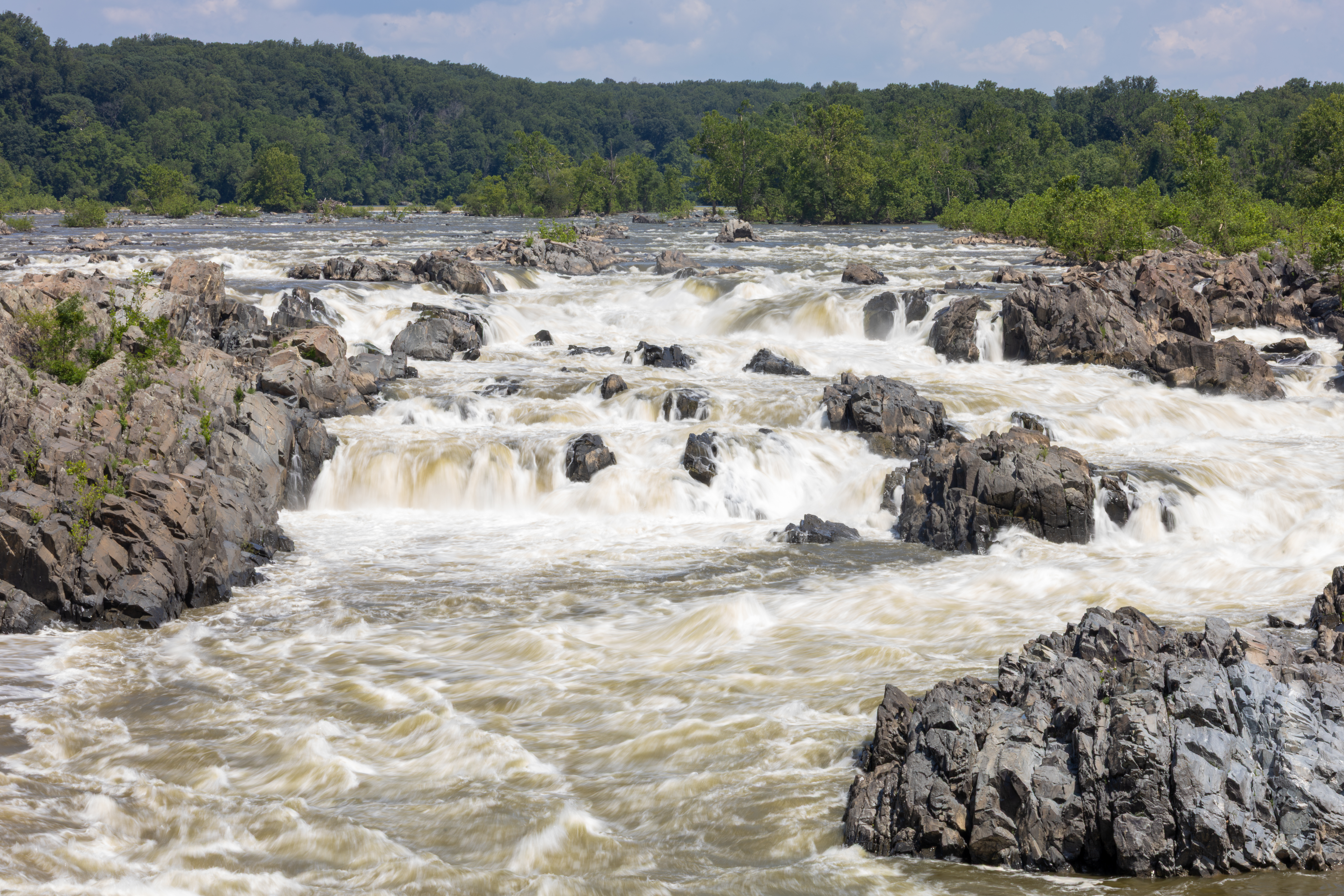

- Location within Virginia Location within the United States
- Location: Fairfax County, Virginia, USA
- Nearest city: McLean, Virginia
- Coordinates: 38°59′51″N 77°15′18″W
- Area: 800 acres (320 ha)
- Established: 1966
- Visitors: 645,000 (in 2002)
- Governing body: National Park Service

Great Falls (climbing area)
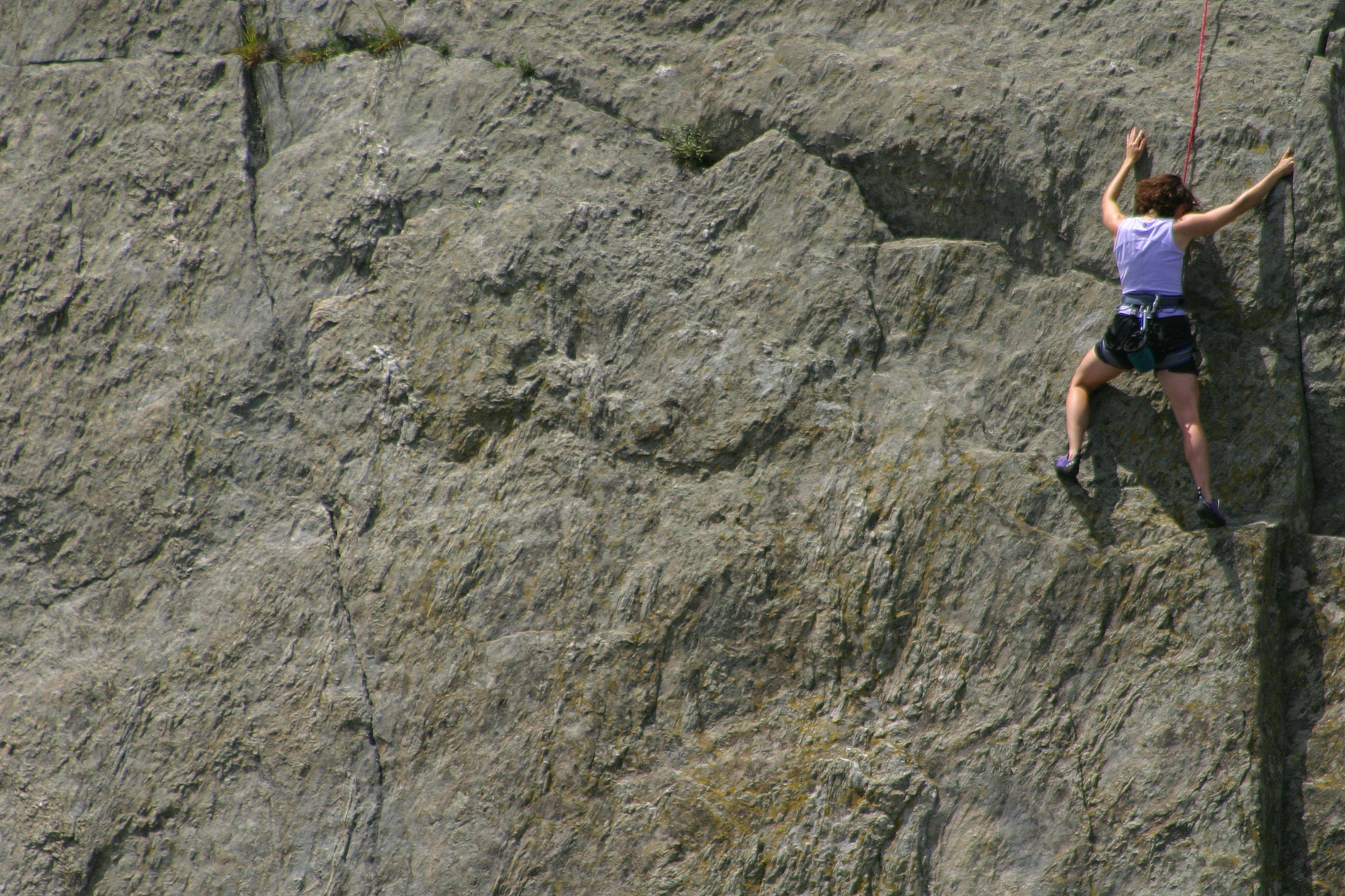

- Location within Virginia Location within the United States
- Location: Fairfax County, Virginia, USA
- Nearest city: McLean, Virginia
- Coordinates: 38°59′20.87″N 77°14′51.52″W
- Type of climbing: top-rope crag
- Height range: 35–50 ft (11–15 m)
- Pitches range: 1
- Technical grades: 5.0-5.12
- NCCS grades: I
- Rock type: Wissahikon Mica-schist with quartz crystals
- Quantity of routes: days worth
- Climbing area developed: very well developed
- Cliff aspect: East facing
- Season: spring to fall
- Ownership: National Park Service
- Camping: none
- Classic climbs: Snowflake (5.6); Romeo's Ladder (5.6); Bird's Nest (5.7); Splinters (5.7); Executioner's song (5.8); Diagonal (5.9); Two-Lane Highway (5.10a); Lost Arrow (5.10)

Great Falls Park is a small National Park Service (NPS) site in Virginia, United States. Situated on 800 acres (3.2 km^{2}) along the banks of the Potomac River in northern Fairfax County, the park is a disconnected but integral part of the George Washington Memorial Parkway. The Great Falls of the Potomac River are near the northern boundary of the park, as are the remains of the Patowmack Canal, the first canal in the United States that used locks to raise and lower boats.

== History ==
Native American petroglyphs have been discovered within the park on cliffs overlooking Difficult Run.

The Patowmack Canal, which George Washington partially funded, was a one-mile (1.6 km) bypass canal that began operating in 1785 to give small barges the opportunity to skirt around the falls and to distribute manufactured goods upstream and raw materials downstream. The park visitor center had the bottom portions of two wooden lock gates from the canal excavated in the 1980s, which can still be found in the park today. The gates survived from at least the 1830s and were found during restoration projects on stonework which were erected for the canal locks. Stonemason marks found on the stones are unique to each artisan and are identical to some found in foundation stones of the White House and the U.S. Capitol.

During the construction of the canal, blasting powder, which at the time was essentially gunpowder, was used to blast through solid rocks. This is one of the first known examples of blasting powder being used for engineering purposes anywhere in the world. The canal was never a profitable enterprise. With the completion of the Chesapeake and Ohio Canal on the opposite side of the river, and the oncoming age of railroads, the project was abandoned in 1830. The canal is a Civil Engineering Landmark as well as a Virginia Historic Landmark. Along the trails, the ruins of the small town of Matildaville, Virginia can also be found.

Between 1906 and 1932, the Great Falls and Old Dominion Railroad and its successor, the Washington and Old Dominion Railway, operated an amusement park (trolley park) at the falls. Located at the end of an electric trolley line that began in Georgetown, Washington, D.C., the park contained picnic grounds, a dance pavilion, and a carousel. In the evenings, a searchlight illuminated the falls. After the railroad went into receivership in 1935 and the Great Falls line was abandoned, the Park was leased by the receivership to a series of concessionaires.

In January 1953, the Park was bought from the receivership by the Fairfax Park Authority using funds set aside to purchase right-of-way for the George Washington Memorial Parkway. The George Washington Memorial Parkway was developed to ensure the easy linkage of George Washington's most visited places. Great Falls Park was a part of the Northern Virginia Parks system until it was transferred to the NPS in 1966. A proposed bridge to span the falls was also considered but, due to a strong lobby to eliminate additional bridges over the Potomac and concerns over environmental impacts, the project was never undertaken.

The park continues to provide picnic grounds and a visitor center but the carousel that operated between 1954 and 1972 was destroyed by a flood caused by Hurricane Agnes.

== Access and amenities ==
Direct access to the park is usually by way of Georgetown Pike (Virginia Route 193) and Old Dominion Drive. Major highways in the vicinity of the park which provide regional connections include the Capital Beltway (Interstate 495), the Dulles Toll Road (Virginia Route 267) and Leesburg Pike (Virginia Route 7). There is a $20 entrance fee per car for visitors who drive into the park. The park is open only during daylight hours.

The park has several viewing platforms that provide visitors with vantage points overlooking the falls. The NPS operates a visitor center near the falls.

Fifteen miles (24 km) of hiking trails traverse the park and follow a small stream known as Difficult Run. A scenic trail near the river travels upstream from a landing at the mouth of Difficult Run, climbs to the top of Mather Gorge and passes the falls, a dam, and a reservoir before ending in Fairfax County's Riverbend Park.

Rock climbers frequent the cliffs in Mather Gorge above the Potomac.

The park contains a large picnic area and sufficient parking for 600 vehicles. On busy weekends, all the parking may fill up by early in the morning, creating delays and temporary closures lasting up to several hours. The NPS does not permit camping in the park.

The falls total 76 feet (20 m) over a series of major cascades. The Great Falls are rated Class 5-6 Whitewater according to the International Scale of River Difficulty. The first kayaker to run them was Tom McEwan in 1975, but only since the early 1990s have the Falls been a popular destination for expert whitewater boaters in the DC area. Below the falls, through Mather Gorge, the river is rated class 2-3 and has been a very popular kayaking run since the 1960s.

Entry into the water above the falls from the Virginia side is illegal. An average of seven drownings per year occur in the Potomac River in the park vicinity, most of them alcohol-related even though consumption of alcoholic beverages is illegal within the park.

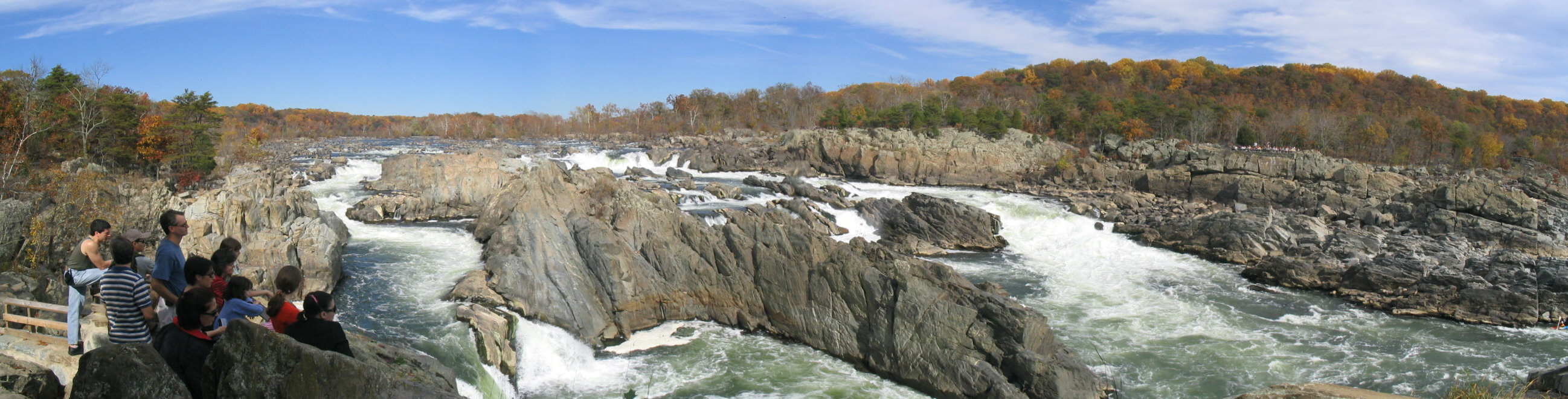
Panoramic view of Great Falls of the Potomac River

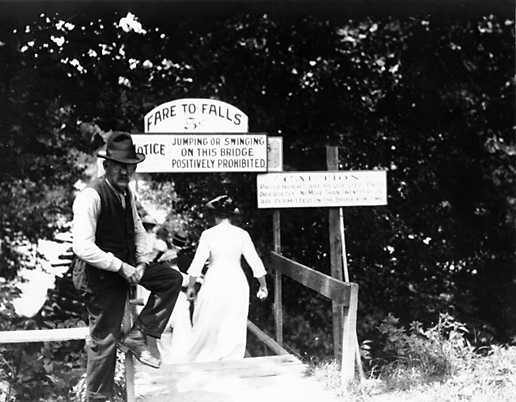
Great Falls Park in the early 1900s

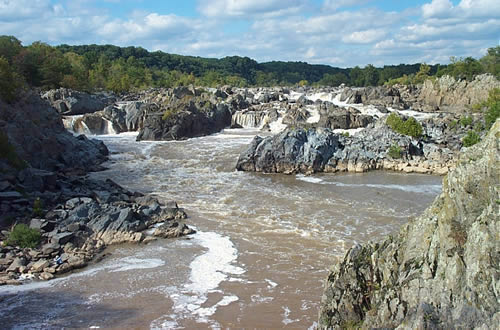
Great Falls of the Potomac River

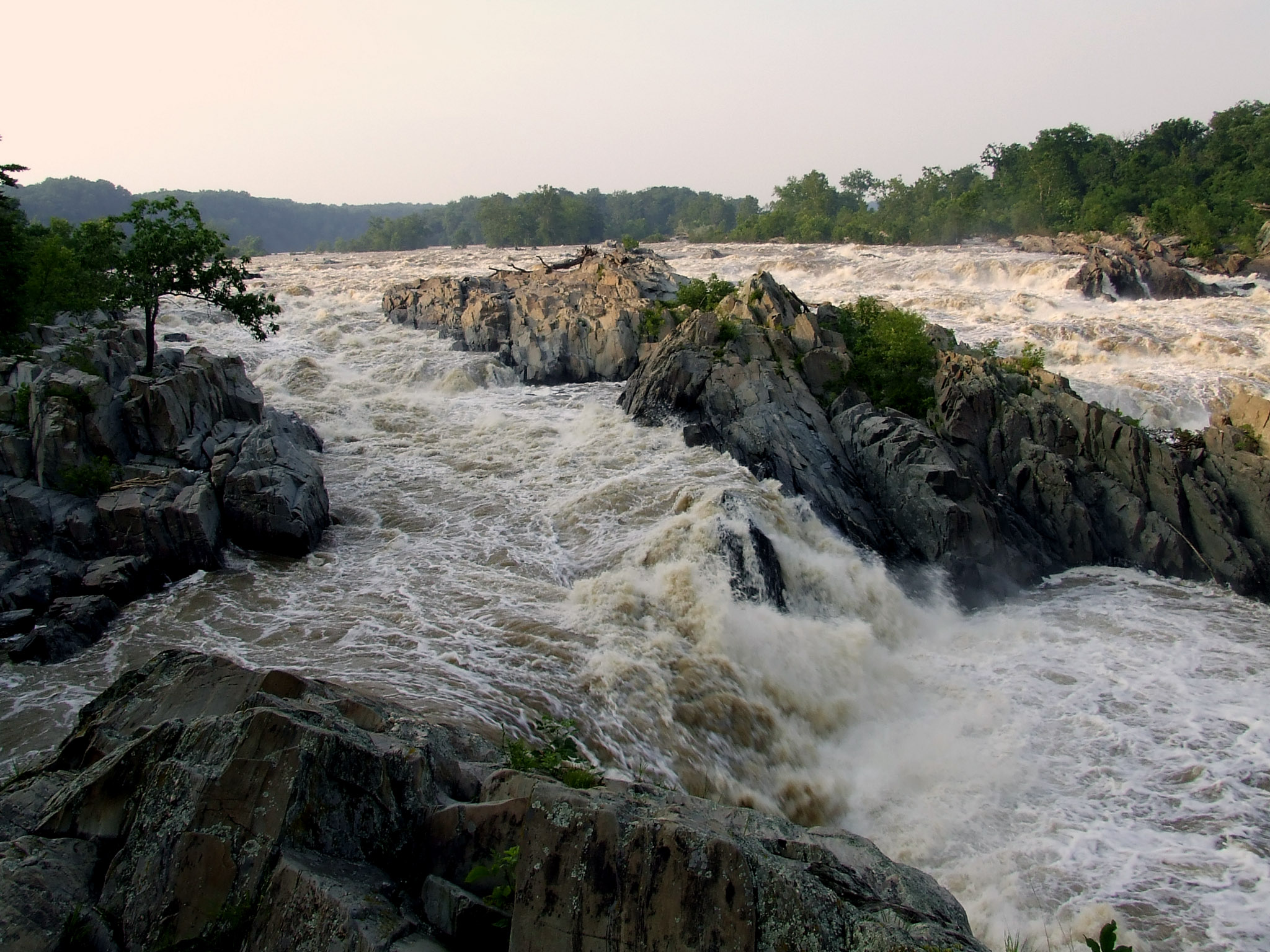
The river during spring flooding

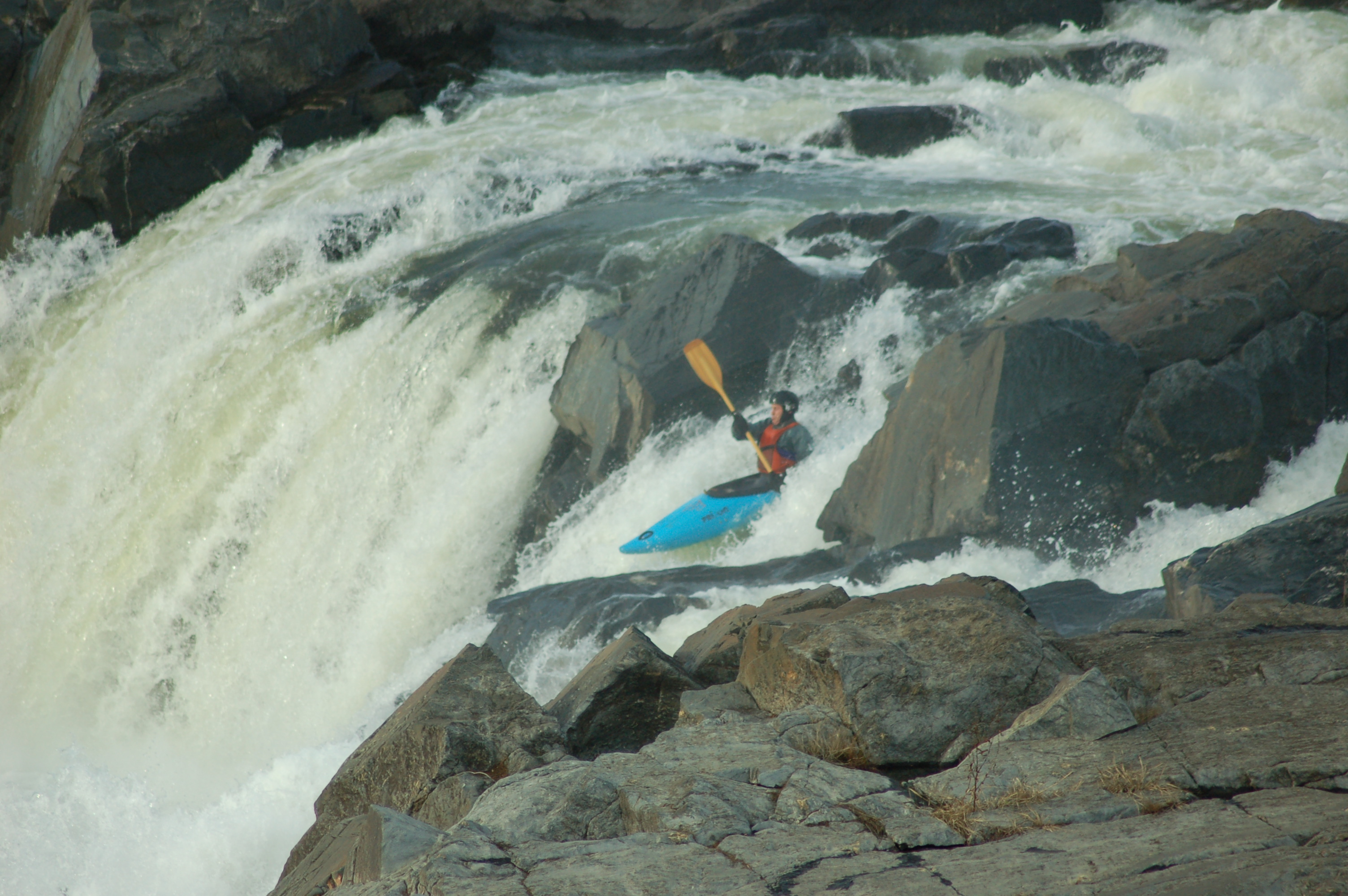
Kayaking at Great Falls

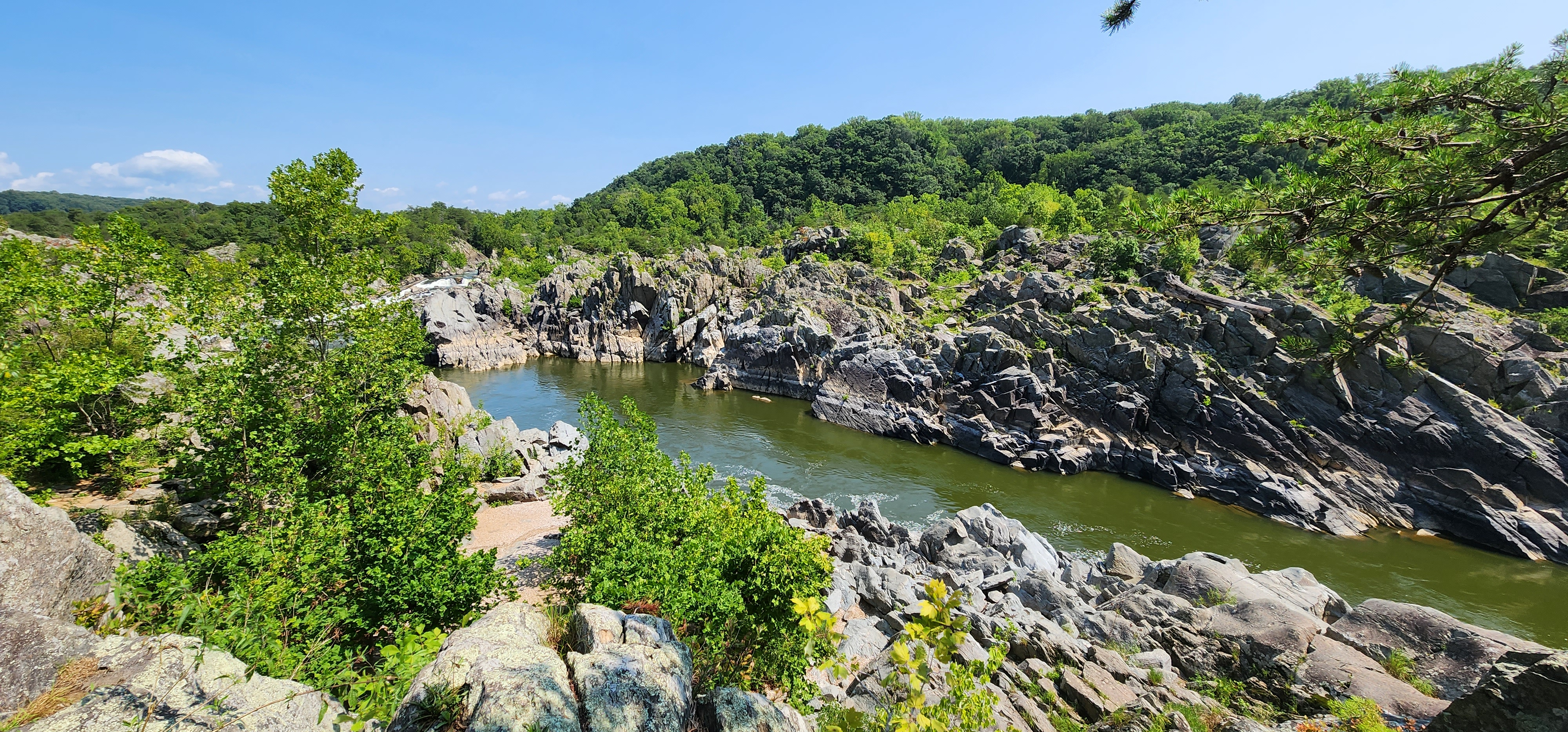
Potomac River at the park

== See also ==
- Chesapeake and Ohio Canal National Historical Park, on the Maryland side of Great Falls
