= Chesapeake and Ohio Canal Association =

US non-profit organization

The Chesapeake and Ohio Canal Association is a not-for-profit organization that supports the Chesapeake and Ohio Canal National Historical Park. Its charter states that the association is "concerned with the conservation of the natural and historical environment of the C&O Canal and the Potomac River Basin."

== History ==
In 1954, Supreme Court Justice William O. Douglas and a group of conservation-minded fellow hikers walked the C&O Canal from Cumberland, Maryland, to Washington, D.C. Their aim was to head off a plan to build a highway atop the canal right-of-way. They advocated that a C&O Canal national park be created instead. Two years following the hike, Douglas proposed, and the hiking group unanimously approved, the formation of the C&O Canal Association to promote the national park proposal. The association organized popular "Reunion" hikes on the canal to publicize the park idea; at the same time, it urged Congress to pass legislation establishing a C&O Canal National Historical Park. These efforts finally yielded fruit in 1971 when Congress enacted the legislation creating the park. In 1991 the Chesapeake & Ohio Canal Canal Association donated its papers to The George Washington University. They are currently under the care of GWU's Special Collections Research Center, located in the Estelle and Melvin Gelman Library. There have been subsequent donations from that time.

== Recent activity and objectives ==
Since 1971, the association has combined its hiking tradition with volunteer service to the Park. The group sponsors major annual hikes in the spring and fall, as well as a Cumberland-to-Washington Through Hike every fifth year in honor of the famous 1954 hike. The association also holds many other hiking, canoeing, cycling, and canal-related events, all open to the general public, as part of a program that offers recreation while enhancing public enthusiasm and support for the C&O Canal NHP.

The association provides volunteers to help the short-staffed Park through programs that include the Level Walkers, individuals who patrol assigned portions of the towpath, removing trash and reporting problems to NPS. The association’s Volunteers-In-Parks group performs such tasks as removing invasive plants, painting and repairing structures, rehabilitating trails, and installing interpretive wayside signs. Other volunteer programs include providing information to Park visitors at Lockhouse 75.

Since 2001, the association has produced C&O Canal "towpath tags," which each year feature an image of a different canal structure or scene. The laminated tags, which offer a way for individuals to show their support of the Park, are available at the Park’s visitor centers. In exchange, visitors make a small suggested contribution that goes directly to the Park.

An overriding objective of the association is maintaining the continuity of the C&O Canal NHP. To that end, the group has worked successfully to help accomplish such projects as restoration of the Widewater section of the towpath and of the Monocacy Aqueduct. The association has also been a supporting partner of the Catoctin Aqueduct Restoration Fund. Since 2005, a major goal has been the restoration of the towpath in the Big Slackwater area, which had been closed due to severe erosion. It was reopened in 2012.

The association recognizes that citizen participation is necessary to securing a bright future for the Park, which is not only vulnerable to the forces of nature, but has long suffered from insufficient resources for its adequate maintenance. Membership in the association is open to anyone who supports the organization’s aim to preserve and protect the C&O Canal and its natural setting along the Potomac River.

== See also ==
- Chesapeake and Ohio Canal
- Chesapeake and Ohio Canal National Historical Park
