= Great Falls (Potomac River) =

Waterfalls on the Potomac River in Maryland and Virginia

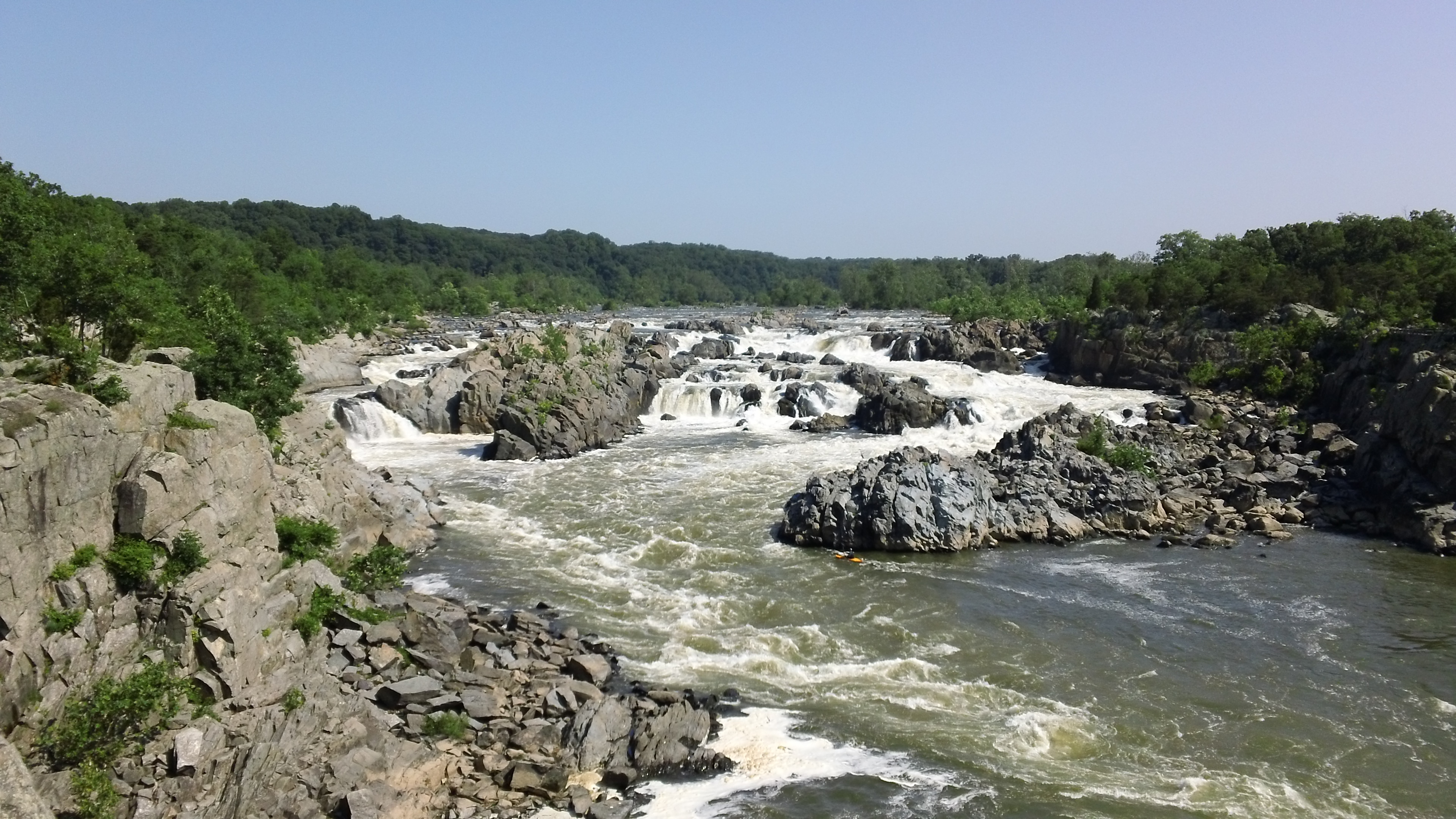
- The Great Falls as seen from Northern Virginia
- Interactive map of Great Falls
- Location: Montgomery County, Maryland and Fairfax County, Virginia, U.S.
- Coordinates: 38°59′51″N 77°15′09″W
- Type: Steep Tiered Cascades
- Elevation: 129 ft (39 m)
- Total height: 47 ft (14 m)
- Average width: 350 ft (110 m)
- Run: 550 ft (170 m)
- Watercourse: Potomac River
- Average flow rate: 16,750 cu ft/s (474 m^{3}/s) (est.)

Great Falls is a series of rapids and waterfalls on the Potomac River in the state of Maryland 14 miles (23 km) upstream from Washington, D.C. As the border between the states of Maryland and Virginia generally follows the low-water line on the Virginia side, the river and falls at Great Falls lie within Montgomery County, Maryland, which abuts Fairfax County, Virginia on the far shore.

Great Falls Park, managed as part of George Washington Memorial Parkway, is on the southern banks in Virginia, and Chesapeake and Ohio Canal National Historical Park parkland is along the northern banks of the river in Maryland. Both are operated by the National Park Service.

The Great Falls area is popular for outdoor activities such as kayaking, whitewater rafting, rock climbing, and hiking. The Billy Goat Trail on Bear Island, and Olmsted Island, both accessible from Maryland, offer scenic views of the Great Falls. There also are overlook points on the Virginia side.

Great Falls and Little Falls (about 5 miles downstream) are named in contradistinction to one another.

The river cascades over a series of 20-foot (6.1 m) falls, dropping a total of 76 feet (23 m) in elevation over a distance of less than 1 mile (1.6 km).

The Potomac narrows as it passes over the falls and through Mather Gorge. Heavy rain or snow in the watershed upstream causes white-water floods which entirely submerge the rocks and even threaten the adjacent park visitor center (built on stilts for this reason). A pillar at the Virginia overlook, well above the river, marks the level reached during the 1936 Northeastern United States Floods.

== History ==
The rocks of the falls are about 750 million years old, dating to the late Precambrian era. They are composed of a resistant metamorphized schist, gneisses, metagraywackes, and metaconglomerates. The Falls themselves formed during the Last Glacial Period, about 35,000 years ago, when sea level most recently dropped, causing the Potomac to downcut its valley.

== Canals ==
Multiple canal systems were built around Great Falls. The remains of the Patowmack Canal, built in the 18th century, can be found on the Virginia side. The canal was commissioned by George Washington and consisted of a system of five locks to allow barges to avoid the falls. Later on, the Chesapeake and Ohio Canal was built in the early 19th century on the Maryland side of the falls. It ultimately connected the Potomac tidewater with Cumberland, Maryland. The Chesapeake and Ohio Canal also used the Great Falls as a feeder (now abandoned) to supply water for its own use.

== Gallery ==
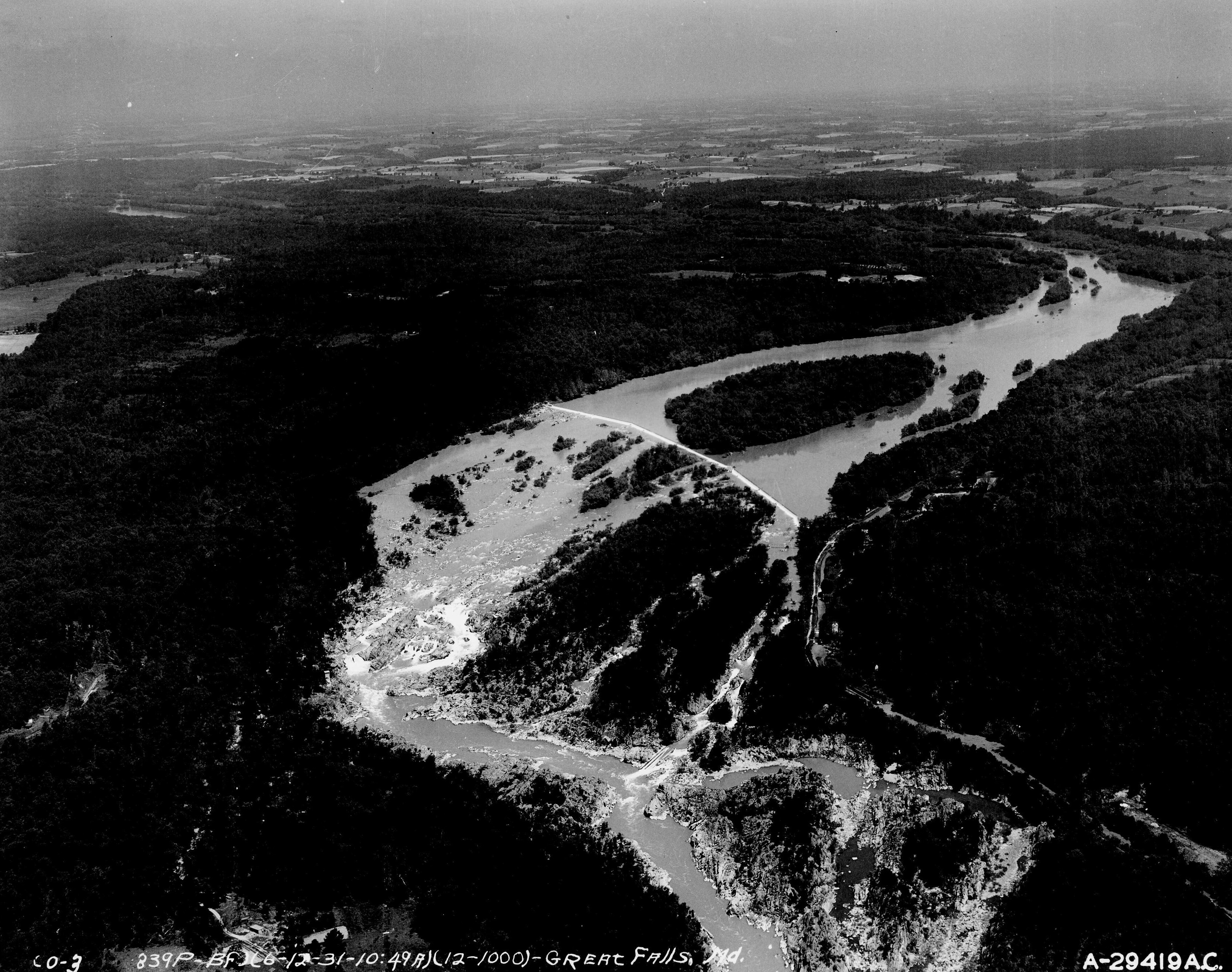
Aerial view, 1945

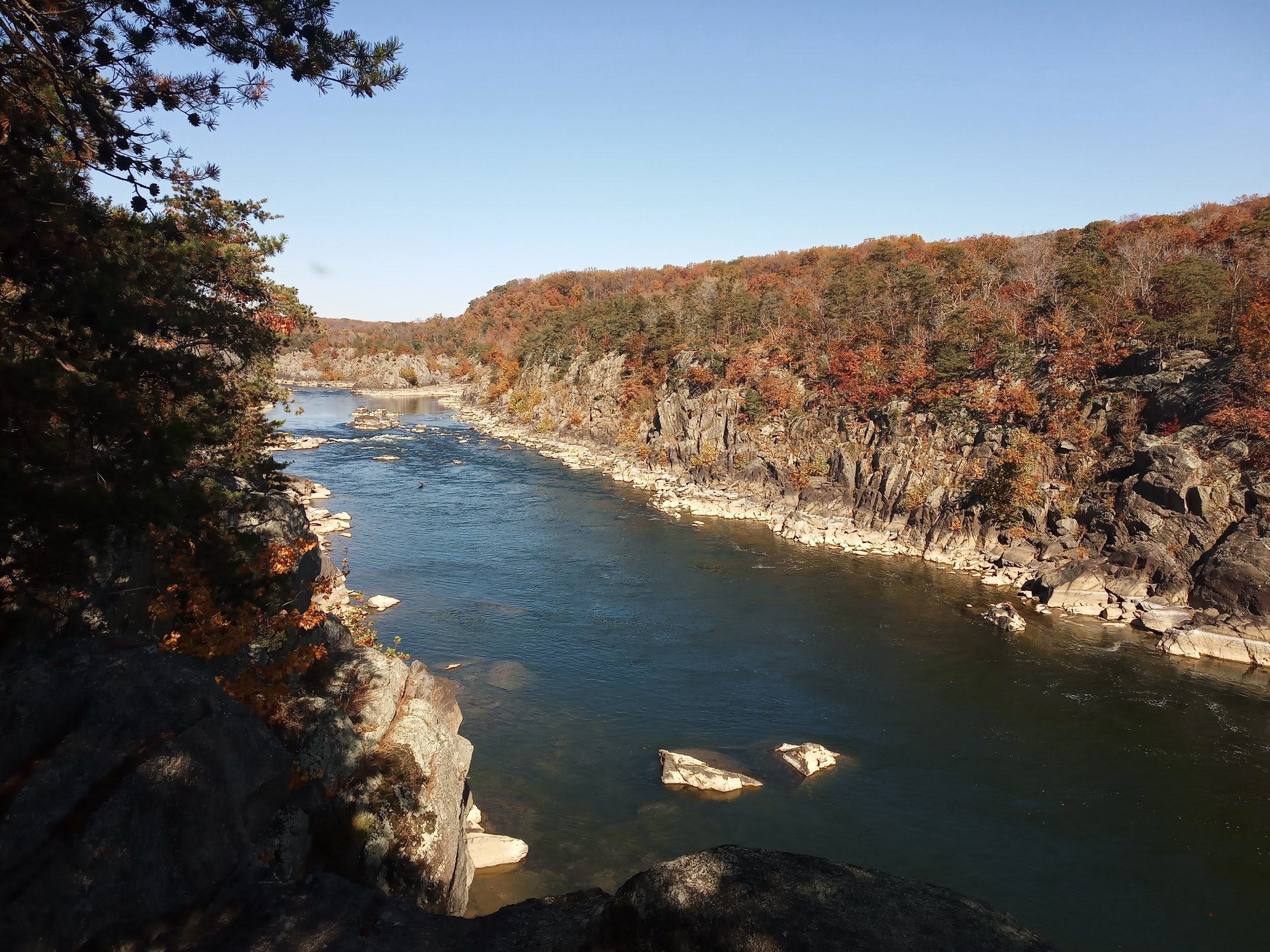
Mather Gorge downstream from the falls

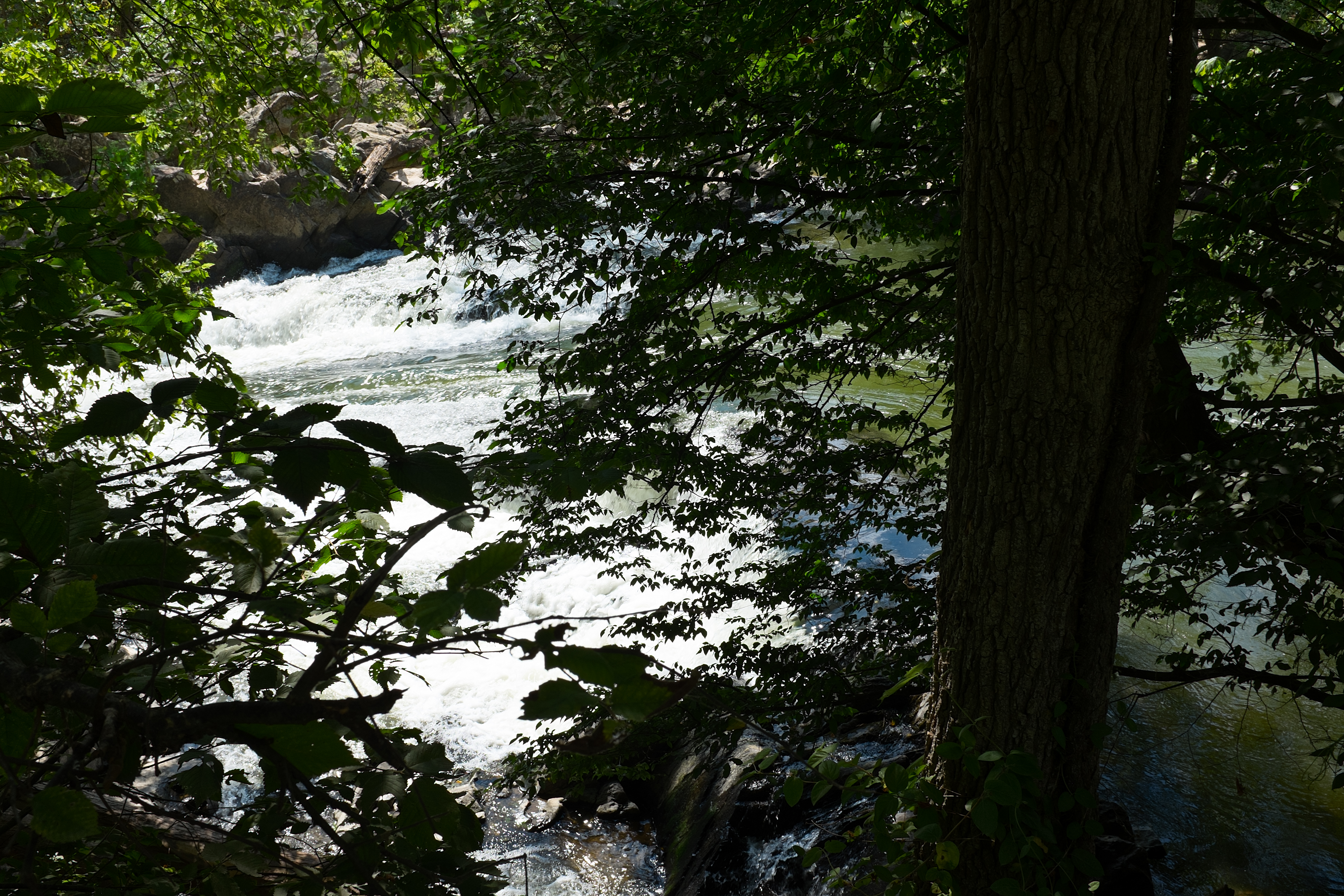
Remains of the feeder dam for the Chesapeake Bay and Ohio Canal at Great Falls

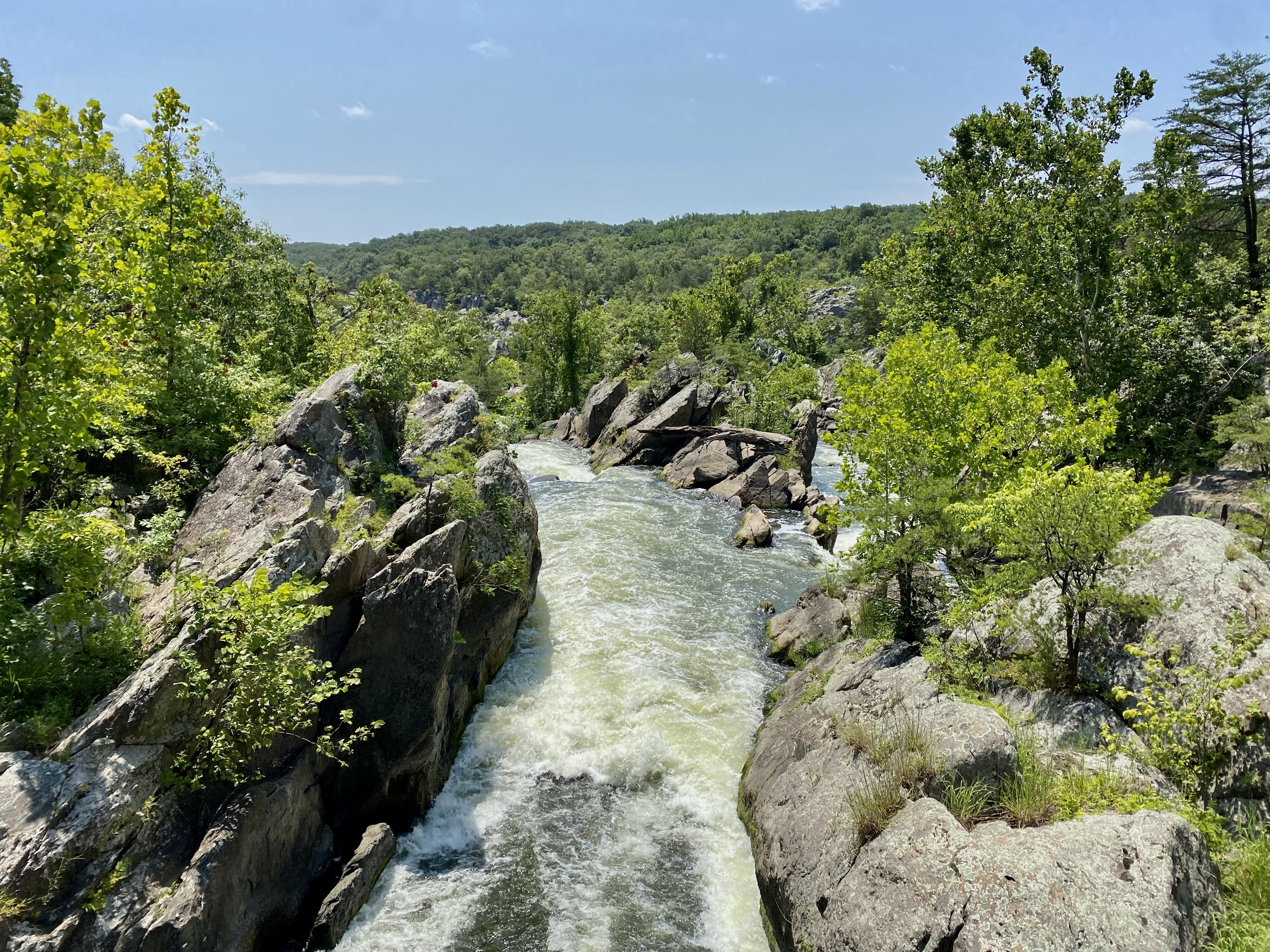
Southward view of the Potomac River from a footbridge on Olmsted Island. July 2021.

View of Great Falls from the Olmsted Island overlook

Great Falls of the Potomac River, between Virginia and Maryland in the United States. January 1, 2014

=== Panoramas ===
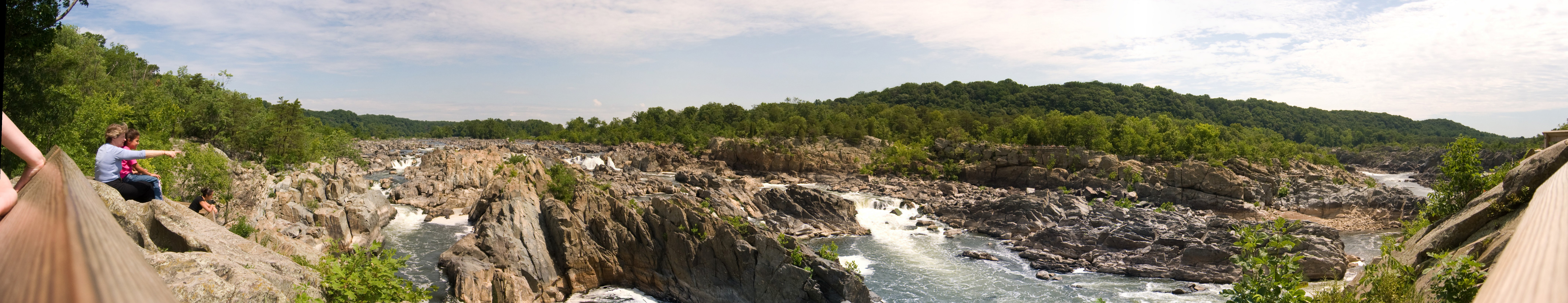
Great Falls panorama from Virginia

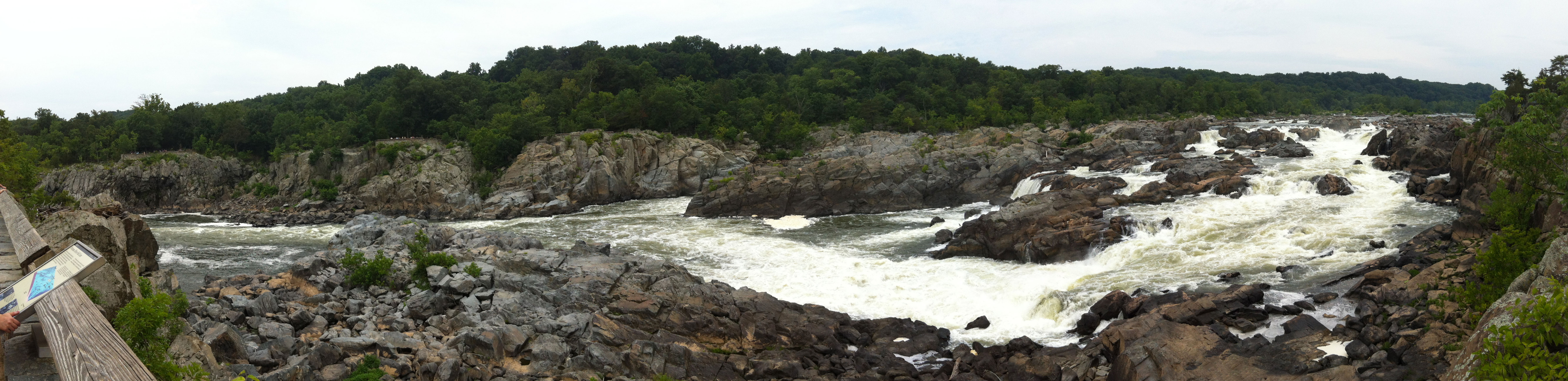
Great Falls panorama from Maryland

== See also ==
- List of waterfalls
