= Bear Island (Maryland) =

Island located in Potomac, Montgomery County, Maryland

- Interactive map of Bear Island

Geography
- Location: Potomac, Montgomery County, Maryland
- Coordinates: 38°59′06″N 77°14′36″W

Administration
- United States

Bear Island is an island located in Potomac, Montgomery County, Maryland between the Potomac River and the Chesapeake and Ohio Canal near the Great Falls. It is managed by the National Park Service as part of the Chesapeake and Ohio Canal National Historical Park and is co-owned by The Nature Conservancy. One of its most popular attractions is the Billy Goat Trail. Pets are not allowed on Bear Island, nor is smoking.
