= Chesapeake and Ohio Canal National Historical Park =

Historic site in Maryland and Washington, D.C.

- U.S. National Register of Historic Places
- Former U.S. National Monument
- U.S. National Historical Park
- IUCN Category V (Protected Landscape/Seascape)
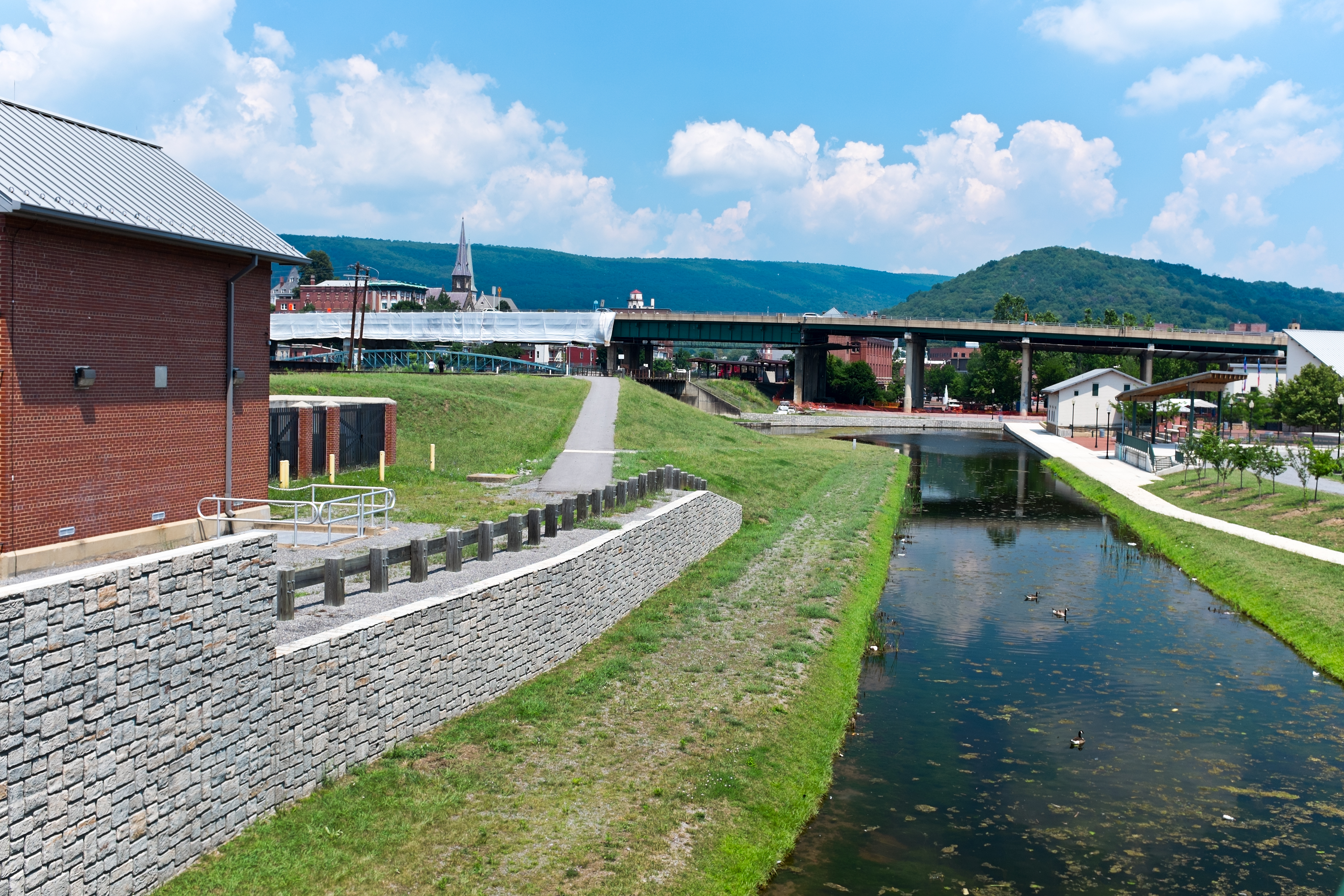
- Cumberland Basin at C&O Canal in 2013

- Location within Maryland Location within the United States
- Location: Bordering the Potomac River from Georgetown to Cumberland, Maryland, U.S.
- Coordinates: 38°53′59″N 77°03′28″W
- Area: 19,586 acres (7,926 ha)
- Built: 1828
- Visitation: 4,286,185 (2022)
- Website: www.nps.gov/choh
- NRHP reference No.: 66000036

Significant dates
- Added to NRHP: October 15, 1966
- Designated NMON: 1961
- Designated NHP: January 8, 1971

The Chesapeake and Ohio Canal National Historical Park, located in the District of Columbia and the state of Maryland, encompasses a canal and towpath trail extending 184.5 miles (296.9 km) along the Potomac River from the Georgetown section of Washington, D.C. to Cumberland, Maryland. The park was established in 1961 as a National Monument by President Dwight D. Eisenhower to preserve the neglected remains of the Chesapeake and Ohio Canal and many of its original structures.

In 2013, the path was designated as the first section of U.S. Bicycle Route 50. With over four million visitors in 2022, it is the most-visited unit that is designated a national historical park of the National Park Service.

== The Chesapeake and Ohio Canal ==
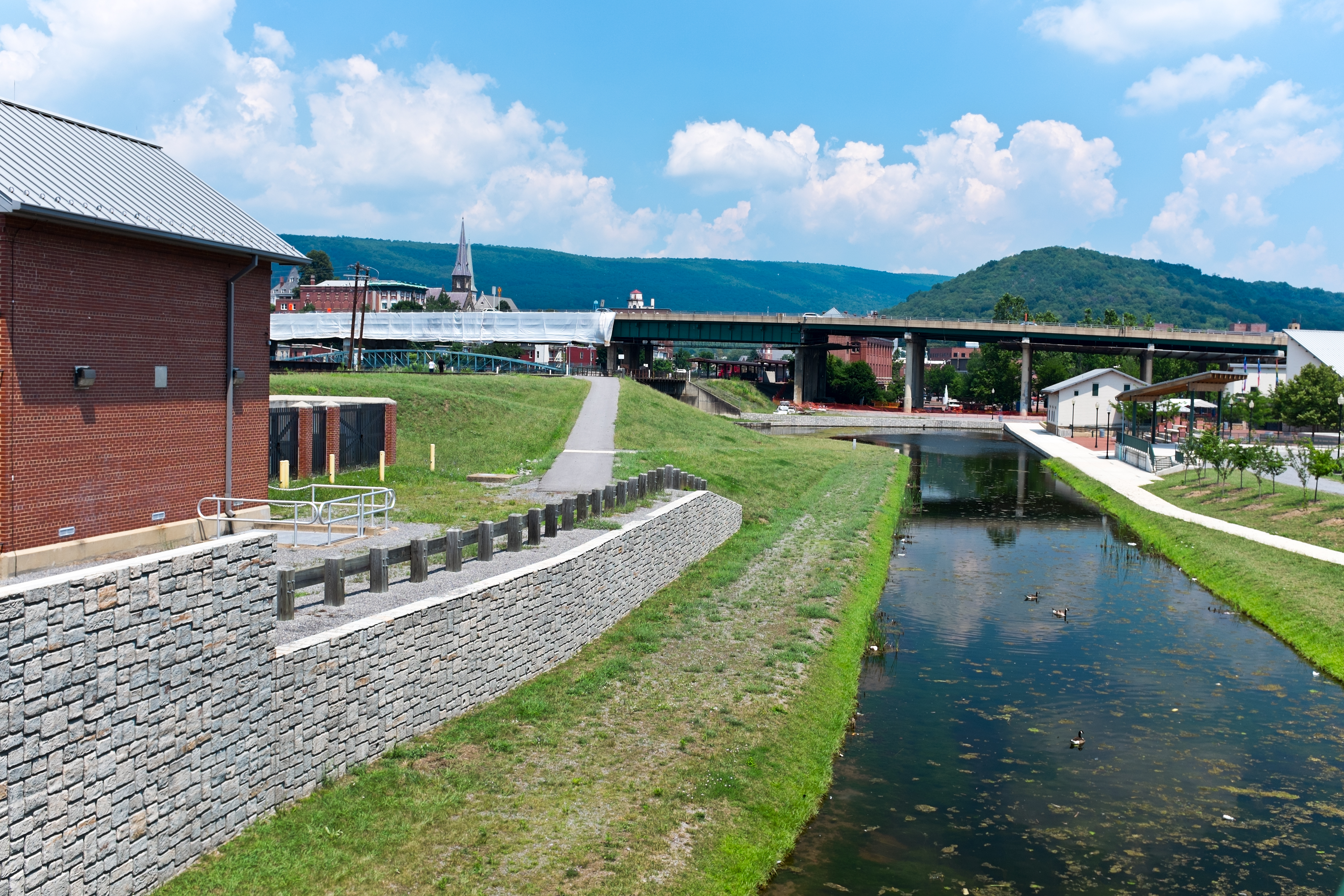
The Cumberland basin at the canal's terminus in 2013. This area has been changed drastically and is almost unrecognizable compared to how it was during the canal's operating days

Construction on the Chesapeake and Ohio Canal (also known as "the Grand Old Ditch" or the "C&O Canal") began in 1828 and ended in 1850 when the canal reached Cumberland, far short of its intended destination of Pittsburgh, Pennsylvania. Occasionally there was talk of extending the 184.5-mile canal: for example, an 1874 proposal to dig an 8.4-mile tunnel through the Allegheny Mountains, and there was a tunnel built to connect with the Pennsylvania canal. Even though the Baltimore and Ohio Railroad (B&O) beat the canal to Cumberland by eight years, the canal was not entirely obsolete. Only in the mid-1870s did larger locomotives and the adoption of air brakes allow the railroad to set rates lower than the canal, sealing its fate.

The C&O Canal operated from 1831 to 1924 and served primarily to transport coal from the Allegheny Mountains to Washington D.C. The canal was closed in 1924, in part due to several severe floods that devastated the canal's financial condition.

=== Federal government purchases canal ===
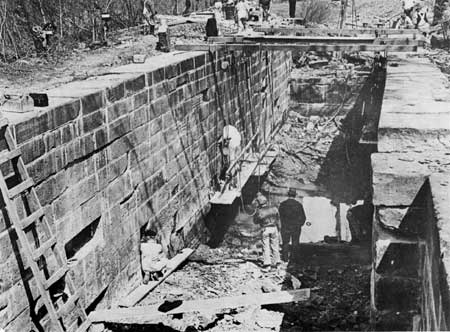
Work on restoring Lock 16 on the canal in 1939

In 1938, the abandoned canal was obtained from the B&O Railroad by the United States in exchange for a loan from the federal Reconstruction Finance Corporation. The government planned to restore it as a recreation area. Additionally, it was viewed as a project for employment for the jobless during the Great Depression. By 1940, the first 22 miles (35 km) of the canal were repaired and rewatered, from Georgetown to Violettes lock (Lock 23) and returned to operating condition by African-American enrollees with the Civilian Conservation Corps. The first Canal Clipper boat, giving mule-driven rides, began in 1941. It was later replaced by the John Quincy Adams in the 1960s.

The project was halted when the United States entered World War II and resources were needed elsewhere. In 1941, Harry Athey suggested to President Franklin Roosevelt that the canal could be converted into an underground highway or a bomb shelter with its roof for landing airplanes. The whole idea was deemed impractical due to the river's periodic flooding. In 1942, freshets destroyed the rewatered sections of the canal. National Park Service (NPS) official Arthur E. Demaray pressed that the canal from Dam #1 be restored, to supply water to the Dalecarlia Reservoir in case sabotage or bombing destroyed the normal conduits of water. Since this transformed the canal into a concern of national security, in 1942, the War Production Board approved the work. By 1943, Congress had funded the work, repairs were done, and the Park Service resumed boat trips in October 1943.

Congress expressed interest in developing the canal and towpath as a parkway. Because of the flooding from the 1920s to the 1940s, the Army Corps of Engineers proposed building 14 dams, that would have permanently inundated 74 miles of towpath, as well as the Monocacy and Antietam aqueducts. Around 1945, the Corps wanted to remove Dam #8, which would destroy any hope of rewatering the canal above Dam #5, as well as put a levee around in the Cumberland area. Much of this was done, with the NPS cooperating with the Corps, since maintaining an operating canal all the way to Cumberland was too expensive, as well as wanting to preserve the western parts of the canal.

== Creation of the national park ==
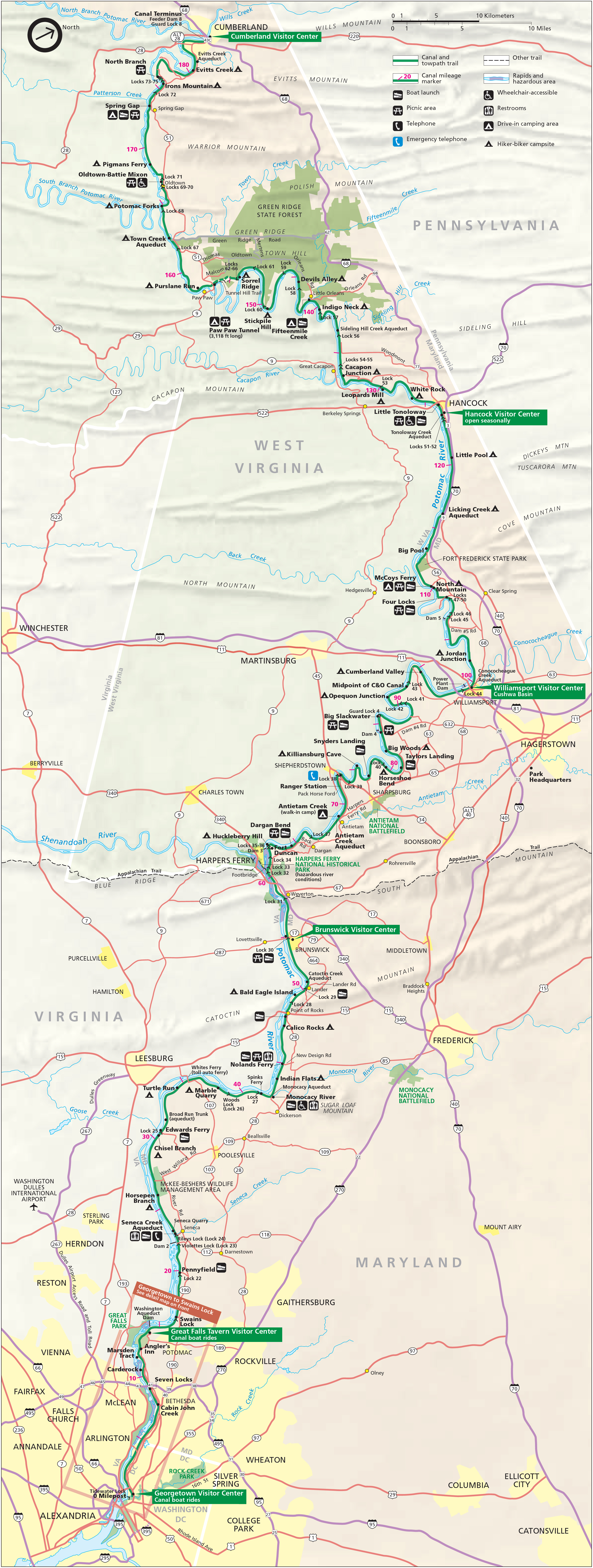
Park map

=== The Douglas hike ===
The idea of turning the canal over to automobiles was opposed by some, including United States Supreme Court Associate Justice William O. Douglas. In March 1954, Douglas led an eight-day hike of the towpath from Cumberland to D.C. 58 people participated in one part of the hike or another; nine, including Douglas, Merlo J. Pusey, and Olaus Murie, hiked the full 184.5 miles (297 km). Afterwards, Douglas formed a committee, renamed in 1957 the C&O Canal Association, that drafted plans to preserve and protect the Canal. Douglas served as the chairman.

=== Towpath ===
In 1958, the entire path was cleared for hiking and a 12-mile bicycle trail was built on the towpath, from Georgetown's Mule Bridge at 34th Street in Washington, DC to Widewater, a meander cutoff of the Potomac in Maryland. The bicycle trail was built by laying crushed blue stone over the muddy towpath and opened on November 22, 1958. Cyclists were biking the full route by 1960.

=== National monument, then national historical park ===
In 1961, President Dwight Eisenhower made the canal a national monument under the Antiquities Act, but that hardened the opposition to making the canal a national park. There was some support for making the Potomac River a national river instead. Within ten years, the political climate had changed, and realizing that the national river plan was unsupportable, the idea of turning the canal into a historic park had little opposition. The Chesapeake and Ohio Canal National Historical Park Act established the canal as a National Historical Park and President Richard Nixon signed it into law on January 8, 1971.

=== Floods of 1996 ===
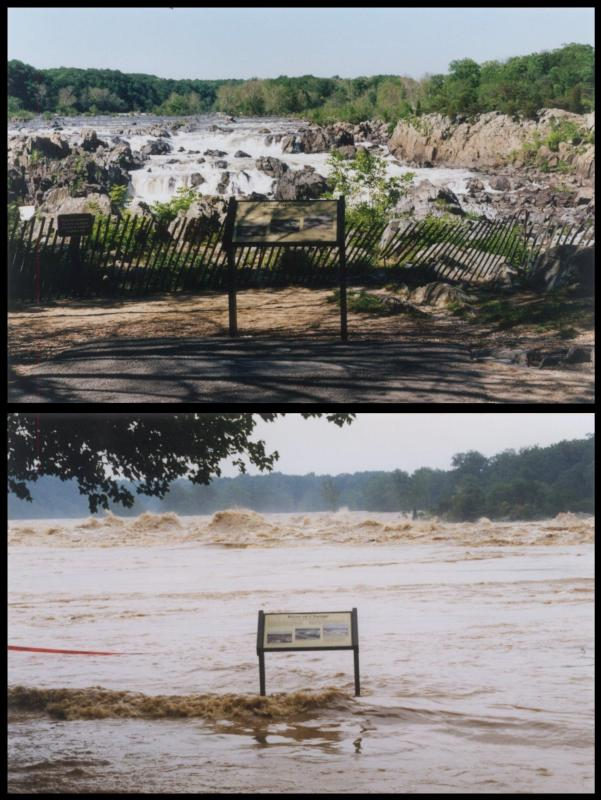
Before summer flooding (top) and after (bottom) in 1996

1996 saw two floods. After a blizzard in January, heavy rains washed away the snow and caused extreme flooding and run-off. The flood swept across 80 to 90 percent of the canal and towpath, damaging them and other park infrastructure. Volunteers helped repair the damage.

In September, Hurricane Fran caused more damage to the canal. Restoring the towpath and re-watering required much time, money, and volunteer effort.

=== Restoration efforts ===
Today, several organizations work to preserve and restore the park's beauty and history. The C&O Canal Trust, founded in 2007, is the official non-profit partner of the National Park Service. The C&O Canal Association is a volunteer organization established in 1954 to help conserve the natural and historical environment of the C&O Canal and the Potomac River Basin. Together they work to restore Canal infrastructure, fix eroded sections of the towpath, and re-water sections of the Canal to keep it beautiful for visitors and wildlife. They also educate the community about the Canal's history at the National Park Service's six visitor centers along the canal: Georgetown, Great Falls Tavern, Brunswick, Williamsport, Hancock, and Cumberland.

Current restoration and construction efforts include restoring and rewatering the Conococheague Aqueduct, restoring Locks 3 and 4, repairs at Great Falls (Lock 20) and Swain's Lock (Lock 21). A second phase of work at the Paw Paw tunnel started on May 13, 2019.

== Today ==
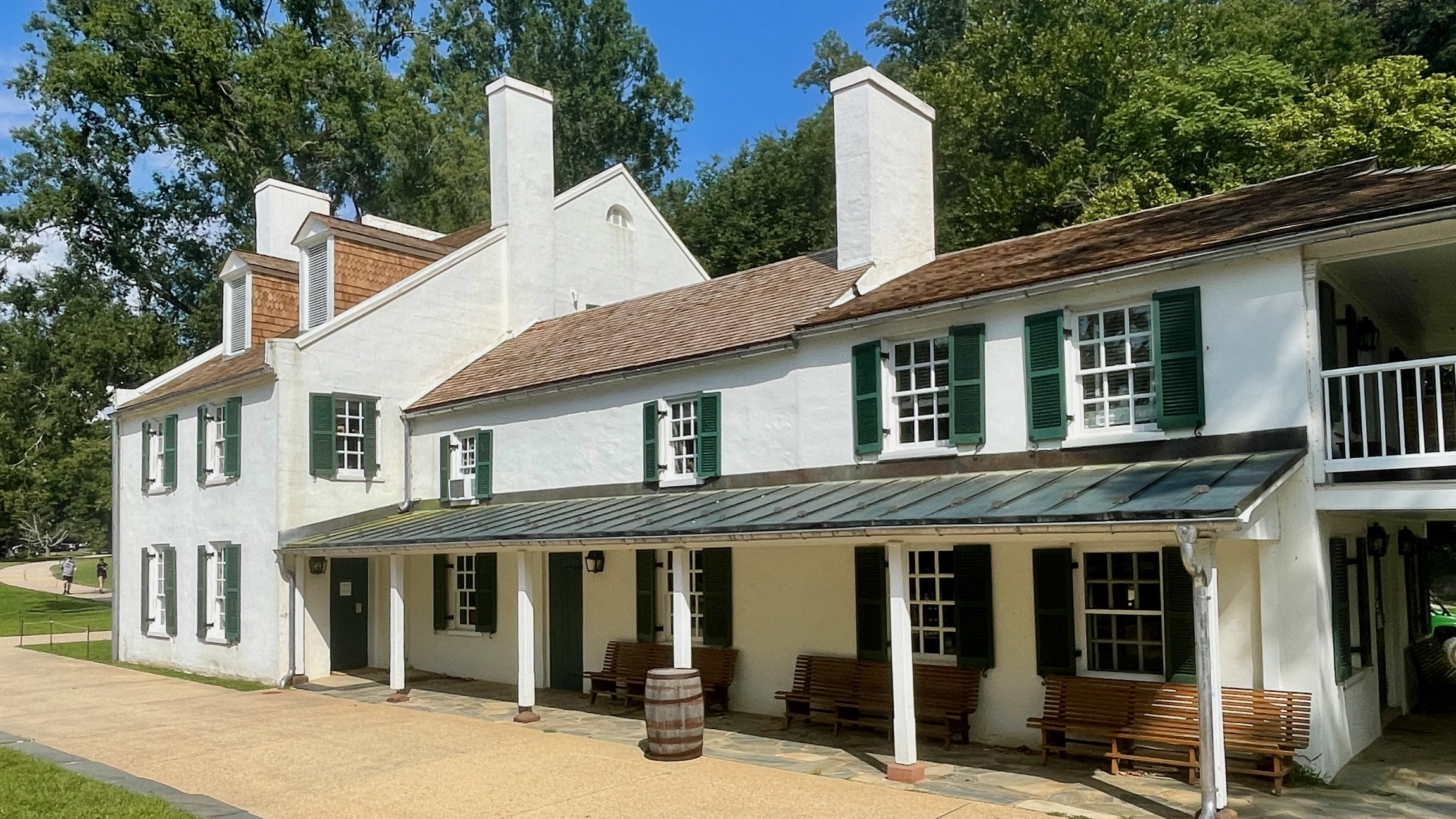
Great Falls Tavern Visitor Center

=== Extent ===
The park includes nearly 20,000 acres (8,100 ha) in a strip along the Potomac River. A small portion of the towpath near Harpers Ferry National Historical Park doubles as a section of the Appalachian Trail.

The canal begins at its zero mile marker (accessible only via Thompson's Boat House), directly on the Potomac, opposite the Watergate complex.

In Allegany County, Maryland, the park includes the Western Maryland Railroad Right-of-Way, Milepost 126 to Milepost 160, listed on the National Register of Historic Places in 1981.

Flooding continues to threaten historical structures on the canal and attempts at restoration. The Park Service has re-watered portions of the canal, but the majority of the canal does not have water in it.

=== Usage ===
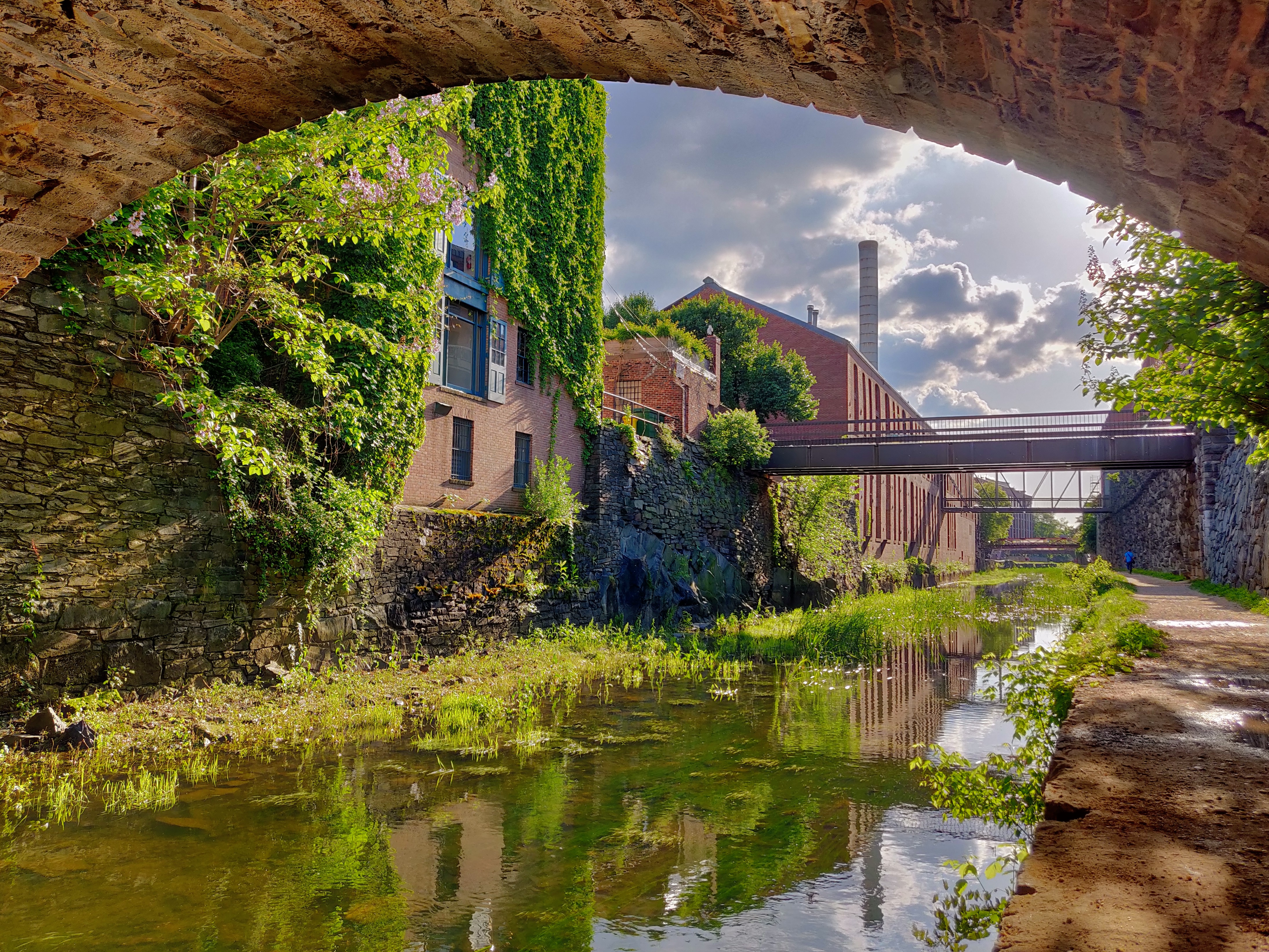
The canal in Georgetown in Spring 2019

Varied in its geography, the canal and its towpath along with the adjacent Potomac offers activities including running, hiking, biking, fishing, boating and kayaking, as well as rock climbing in certain locations. The Canal also offers a variety of wildlife and birdwatching opportunities.

The seven National Park Service visitor centers have displays and interpretive exhibits on the history of the canal. The park offers rides on two reproduction canal boats—the Georgetown and the Charles F. Mercer (named after the first president of the Canal corporation, and not the first boat on the canal named Charles F. Mercer)—during the spring, summer and autumn. The boats are pulled by mules, and park rangers in historical dress work the locks and boat while presenting a historical program.

Chesapeake and Ohio Canal National Historical Park receives around five million recreation visits annually. Access through the Great Falls Tavern Visitor Center requires payment, but access anywhere else in the park is free. In January 2015, the National Park Service proposed adding entrance fees to virtually all access points along the towpath; the proposal was rescinded in February, amid backlash from communities along the canal.

On February 9, 1963, Robert F. Kennedy succeeded in hiking from Great Falls, Maryland to Harpers Ferry, West Virginia along the C&O Canal towpath as part of the "50 mile frenzy" created by his brother President John F. Kennedy.

==== Hiker biker campsites ====
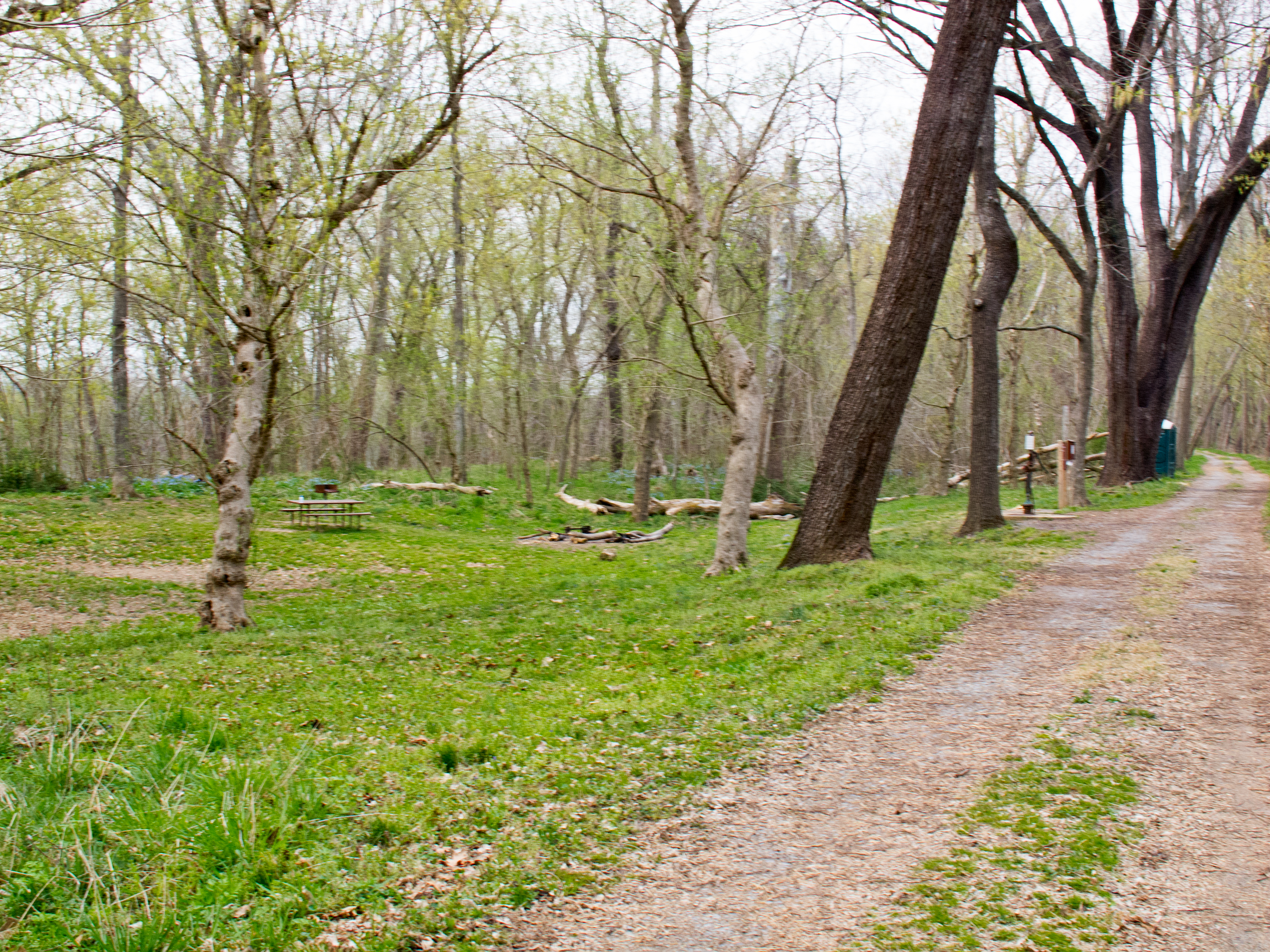
Turtle Run Hiker Biker campsite

The National Park Service maintains a number of hiker/biker campsites, about every 5–7 miles (8–11 km) along the towpath. These are available for free on a first come first served basis. Each site has a water pump (mid-April to mid-November), picnic area, firepit, and latrine; nearest vehicular access points vary from 0.2 miles (0.3 km) to "remote". A list of hiker biker campsites is available from the NPS.

==== Other camping ====
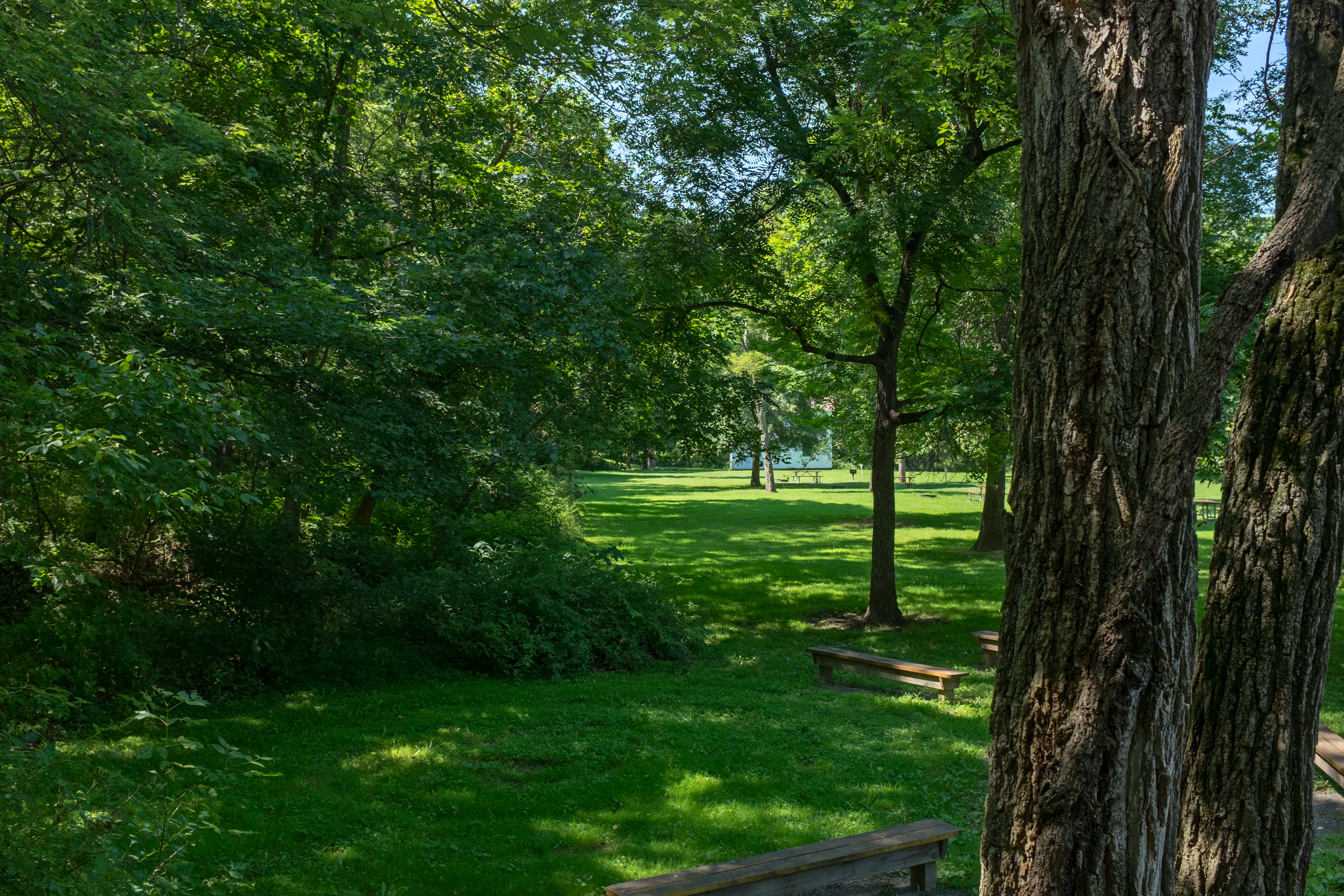
Campground at Paw Paw

The C&O Canal NHP also offers tent and primitive RV campsites for individuals and group as large as 35. Not all campsites have all amenities; campsites may have some or all of parking, restrooms, picnic tables, boat ramp, and nearby shopping. Hiker-biker campsites are free of charge to use for a maximum of one night per trip. They are used under a first-come, first-served basis. As of December 1, 2016 all drive-in (car) campsites moved from a first-come, first served system to a reservation system on Recreation.gov. Here is a list of the drive-in, reservation campsites:

| Towpath Mileage | Campsite | Type | Comments |
|---|---|---|---|
| 11.0 | Marsden Tract | Group | Permit required |
| 69.9 | Antietam Creek | Car | |
| 110.4 | McCoys Ferry | Car, Group | |
| 140.9 | Fifteenmile Creek | Car, Group | |
| 156.1 | Paw Paw Tunnel | Car, Group | |
| 173.3 | Spring Gap | Car, Group | |

Education

Since 2013, the park has offered run a Canal Classrooms program for historical education for to K-12 students at three Great Falls, Williamsport, and Cumberland. The program for lower elementary grades looks at "the lifestyles of children along the canal in historical and modern contexts". Upper elementary grades can choose between "The C&O Canal: A Place of Refuge, Recreation, and Reflection", examining the civic activism of Justice William O. Douglas in preserving the canal; and "The Underground Railroad at the C&O Canal". Middle schoolers can take "The Building of the Chesapeake and Ohio Canal", which looks at the canal's socioeconomic impact on early industrialization.

== See also ==
- Bear Island
- Billy Goat Trail
- Brunswick Visitor Center
- Chesapeake and Ohio Canal Association
- Great Falls of the Potomac River
- Harpers Ferry National Historical Park
- Olmsted Island
